= Emerson, Lake & Palmer discography =

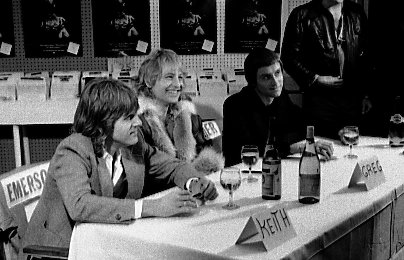
- The band in 1978
- Studio albums: 9
- Live albums: 24
- Compilation albums: 12
- Singles: 17

The discography of Emerson, Lake & Palmer, an English progressive rock band, includes 9 studio albums, 24 live albums, 12 compilation albums and 17 singles.

== Albums ==
=== Studio albums ===
Title	Album details	Peak chart positions												Certifications
Title	Album details	UK	AUS	AUT	CAN	FIN	GER	ITA	NED	NOR	SWI	JP	US	Certifications
Emerson, Lake & Palmer	Released: 20 November 1970; Label: Island	4	9	—	17	—	7	20	4	18	—	66	18	UK: Gold; US: Gold
Tarkus	Released: 4 June 1971; Label: Island	1	6	—	12	6	4	1	6	7	—	55	9	UK: Gold; US: Gold
Trilogy	Released: 23 June 1972; Label: Island	2	18	—	5	2	6	2	4	4	—	4	5	UK: Gold; US: Gold
Brain Salad Surgery	Released: 7 December 1973; Label: Manticore	2	17	5	10	26	18	9	4	5	20	18	11	UK: Gold; US: Gold
Works Volume 1	Released: 25 March 1977; Label: Atlantic	9	6	11	17	—	10	5	17	11	—	13	12	UK: Gold; CAN: Gold; US: Gold
Works Volume 2	Released: 25 November 1977; Label: Atlantic	20	37	—	34	—	50	—	—	—	—	38	37	US: Gold
Love Beach	Released: 17 November 1978; Label: Atlantic	48	82	—	52	—	—	—	—	—	—	—	55	UK: Silver; US: Gold
Emerson, Lake & Powell (Emerson, Lake & Powell album)	Released: 2 June 1986; Label: Polydor	35	—	—	—	—	—	—	—	—	—	19	23	CAN: Gold
Black Moon	Released: 18 May 1992; Label: Victory	—	—	—	66	—	45	—	77	—	23	16	78	
In the Hot Seat	Released: 26 September 1994; Label: Victory	—	—	—	—	—	—	—	—	—	—	60	—	
"—" denotes items that did not chart or were not released in that territory.

=== Live albums ===
Title	Album details	Peak chart positions											Certifications
Title	Album details	UK	AUS	AUT	CAN	FIN	GER	ITA	NED	NOR	JP	US	Certifications
Pictures at an Exhibition	Released: November 1971; Label: Island	3	19	—	3	8	9	5	6	18	2	10	UK: Silver; US: Gold
Welcome Back My Friends...	Released: August 1974; Label: Manticore	6	34	2	6	—	26	7	—	16	23	4	US: Gold
In Concert	Released: 16 November 1979; Label: Atlantic	—	—	—	80	—	—	—	3	—	—	73	
Live at the Royal Albert Hall	Released: 1 February 1993; Label: Sanctuary	—	—	—	—	—	92	—	—	—	89	—	
Works Live	Released: 13 December 1993; Label: Victor	—	—	—	—	—	—	—	—	—	—	—	
Live at the Isle of Wight Festival 1970	Released: 1997; Label: Sanctuary	—	—	—	—	—	—	—	—	—	—	—	
Live in Poland	Released: 1997; Label: Sanctuary	—	—	—	—	—	—	—	—	—	—	—	
King Biscuit Flower Hour: Greatest Hits Live	Released: 1997; Label: King Biscuit	—	—	—	—	—	—	—	—	—	—	—	
Then and Now	Released: 24 November 1998; Label: Eagle	—	—	—	—	—	—	—	—	—	—	—	
The Original Bootleg Series from the Manticore Vaults Vol.1	Released: August 2001; Label: Castle	—	—	—	—	—	—	—	—	—	—	—	
The Original Bootleg Series from the Manticore Vaults Vol.2	Released: August 2001; Label: Castle	—	—	—	—	—	—	—	—	—	—	—	
The Original Bootleg Series from the Manticore Vaults Vol.3	Released: July 2002; Label: Castle	—	—	—	—	—	—	—	—	—	—	—	
From the Front Row...Live!	Released: 2003; Label: Silverline	—	—	—	—	—	—	—	—	—	—	—	
The Original Bootleg Series from the Manticore Vaults Vol.4	Released: 2006; Label: Castle	—	—	—	—	—	—	—	—	—	—	—	
A Time and a Place	Released: 14 May 2010; Label: Shout! Factory	—	—	—	—	—	—	—	—	—	—	—	
High Voltage	Released: 5 October 2010; Label: Concert Live	—	—	—	—	—	—	—	—	—	—	—	
Live at Nassau Coliseum '78	Released: 22 February 2011; Label: Shout! Factory	—	—	—	—	—	—	—	—	—	—	—	
Live at the Mar Y Sol Festival '72	Released: 6 December 2011; Label: Shout! Factory	—	—	—	—	—	—	—	—	—	—	—	
Live in California 1974	Released: 2012; Label: Shout! Factory	—	—	—	—	—	—	—	—	—	—	—	
Live in Montreal 1977	Released: 2013; Label: Shout! Factory	—	—	—	—	—	—	—	—	—	—	—	
Once Upon a Time: Live in South America 1997	Released: 2015; Label: Rockbeat	—	—	—	—	—	—	—	—	—	—	—	
Live at Montreux 1997	Released: 2015; Label: Eagle	—	—	—	—	—	—	—	—	—	—	—	
Masters from The Vaults	Released: 2017; Label: Vivid	—	—	—	—	—	—	—	—	—	—	—	
Live At Pocono International Raceway, U.S.A., 8th July 1972	Released: 13 April 2019; Label: BMG	—	—	—	—	—	—	—	—	—	—	—	
"—" denotes items that did not chart or were not released in that territory.

=== Compilation albums ===
Title	Album details	Peak chart positions					Certifications
Title	Album details	UK	UK Indie	ITA	SCO	US	Certifications
The Best of Emerson, Lake & Palmer	Released: 14 November 1980; Label: Atlantic	—	—	—	—	108	UK: Gold
The Atlantic Years	Released: July 1992; Label: Atlantic	—	—	—	—	—	
The Return of the Manticore	Released: 13 December 1993; Label: Rhino	—	—	—	—	—	
The Best of Emerson, Lake & Palmer	Released: 1994; Label: Atlantic	—	—	—	—	—	
Classic Rock featuring "Lucky Man"	Released: 1994; Label: Rebound	—	—	—	—	—	
The Very Best of Emerson, Lake & Palmer	Released: 2000; Label: Rhino	—	—	—	—	—	
Extended Versions: The Encore Collection	Released: 2000; Label: BMG	—	—	—	—	—	
Fanfare for the Common Man	Released: 2001; Label: Sanctuary	—	—	—	—	—	UK: Gold
The Ultimate Collection	Released: 19 June 2004; Label: Sanctuary	43	5	59	48	—	
The Essential Emerson, Lake & Palmer	Released: 2007; Label: Manticore	—	—	—	—	—	
From the Beginning	Released: 17 September 2007; Label: Sanctuary	—	—	—	—	—	
Gold Edition	Released: December 2007; Label: Nun Entertainment	—	—	—	—	—	
The Ultimate Collection (3 CD)	Released: 2020; Label: BMG	—	—	—	—	—	
"—" denotes items that did not chart or were not released in that territory.

== Singles ==
Year	Title	Peak chart positions								Certifications	Album
Year	Title	UK	BEL	CAN	GER	NED	JP	US	US Main	Certifications	Album
1970	"Lucky Man"		20	25	23	14	—	48	—		Emerson, Lake & Palmer
1971	"Stones of Years" ^{[E]}			—			—	—	—		Tarkus
1972	"Nut Rocker" (live)			48			70	70	—		Pictures at an Exhibition
1972	"From the Beginning"			34			—	39	—		Trilogy
1972	"Hoedown" ^{[A]}								—		Trilogy
1973	"Jerusalem" ^{[1]}	52			—	—			—		Brain Salad Surgery
1977	"Fanfare for the Common Man"	2		—	—	—	—	—	—	UK: Silver	Works Volume 1
1977	"C'est la Vie" ^{[B]} ^{[2]}	—		75			—	91	—		Works Volume 1
1977	"Tiger in a Spotlight" ^{[G]}				—				—		Works Volume 2
1977	"Maple Leaf Rag" ^{[C]}								—		Works Volume 2
1978	"Watching Over You" ^{[B]}	—		—					—		Works Volume 2
1978	"All I Want Is You" ^{[D]}	—		—	—		—	—	—		Love Beach
1979	"Peter Gunn" (live)	—	16	—	—	2		—	—		In Concert
1986	"Touch and Go"	60		—			—	—	2		Emerson, Lake & Powell
1986	"Lay Down Your Guns"			—				—	—		Emerson, Lake & Powell
1992	"Black Moon"	—	—		—	—			44		Black Moon
1992	"Affairs of the Heart"	—	—		—	—	—		—		Black Moon
1993	"I Believe in Father Christmas" ^{[F]}	—						—	—		The Return of the Manticore
1993	"Lucky Man" (live) ^{[G]}				—				—		Live at the Royal Albert Hall
"—" denotes items that did not chart.

Notes

- 1 - "Jerusalem" was banned by the BBC, but charted in UK's Music Week Top 75.
- 2 - Hit #14 in South Africa, Nov 1977
- A - released in France.
- B - A-side credited as 'Greg Lake'.
- C - released in Italy. A-side credited as 'Keith Emerson'.
- D - In Germany, "Canario" was the A-side, "All I want is You" the B-side.
- E - released in US/Canada/JPN/NZ.
- F - new studio version 1993
- G - released in Germany.

== Video albums ==
Title	Album details
Live '77	Released: 1985; Formats: VHS
Pictures at an Exhibition	Released: 1986; Formats: VHS, DVD
The Manticore Special	Released: 1998; Formats: VHS
Works Orchestral Tour / The Manticore Special	Released: 2002; Formats: DVD
Live at the Royal Albert Hall	Released: 2003; Formats: DVD
Welcome Back ....	Released: 2003; Formats: DVD
Masters from The Vaults	Released: 2004; Formats: DVD
Live at Montreux 1997	Released: 2004; Formats: DVD
Beyond the Beginning	Released: 2005; Formats: DVD
Pictures at an Exhibition – 35th Anniversary Special Edition	Released: 2005; Formats: DVD
The Birth of a Band – Isle of Wight 1970	Released: 2006; Formats: DVD
Live at the Royal Albert Hall	Released: 2009; Formats: DVD
Welcome Back My Friends: 40th Anniversary Reunion Concert	Released: 2010; Formats: DVD, Blu-ray
