= The Essential Emerson, Lake & Palmer =

Compilation album by Emerson, Lake & Palmer
- Released: 2007
- Recorded: 1970–78, 1992–97
- Genre: Progressive rock
- Label: Shout! Factory; Manticore
- Producer: Greg Lake; Mark Mancina

Emerson, Lake & Palmer chronology
The Original Bootleg Series from the Manticore Vaults Vol.4 (2006)	The Essential Emerson, Lake & Palmer (2007)	From the Beginning (2007)

Professional ratings
Review scores
Source	Rating
AllMusic	3.5/5 stars

The Essential Emerson, Lake & Palmer is a greatest hits album by British progressive rock band Emerson, Lake & Palmer, released in 2007.

== Track listing ==
=== Disc 1 ===
No.	Title	Writer(s)	Original album	Length
1.	"The Barbarian"	Keith Emerson, Greg Lake, Carl Palmer	Emerson, Lake & Palmer, 1970	4:28
2.	"Take a Pebble"	Lake	Emerson, Lake & Palmer	12:29
3.	"Knife-Edge" (Adapted from Leoš Janáček's Sinfonia)	Leoš Janáček, Johann Sebastian Bach, arr. by Emerson, Lake, Richard Fraser	Emerson, Lake & Palmer	5:03
4.	"Tank"	Emerson, Palmer	Emerson, Lake & Palmer	6:47
5.	"Lucky Man"	Lake	Emerson, Lake & Palmer	4:36
6.	"Tarkus": 1. "A) Eruption"; 2. "B) Stones of Years"; 3. "C) Iconoclast"; 4. "D) Mass"; 5. "E) Manticore"; 6. "F) Battlefield"; 7. "G) Aquatarkus"	Emerson, Lake	Tarkus, 1971	20:39
7.	"Bitches Crystal"	Emerson, Lake	Tarkus	3:55
8.	"Nut Rocker" (Live)	Pyotr Ilyich Tchaikovsky, Kim Fowley, arr. by Emerson, Lake, Palmer	Pictures at an Exhibition, 1971	3:56
9.	"From the Beginning"	Lake	Trilogy, 1972	4:13
10.	"Hoedown"	Aaron Copland, arr. by Emerson, Lake, Palmer	Trilogy	3:43
11.	"Trilogy"	Emerson, Lake	Trilogy	8:54

=== Disc 2 ===
No.	Title	Writer(s)	Original album	Length
1.	"The Endless Enigma, Part One"	Emerson, Lake	Trilogy	6:41
2.	"Fugue"	Emerson	Trilogy	1:56
3.	"The Endless Enigma, Part Two"	Emerson, Lake	Trilogy	2:00
4.	"Jerusalem"	William Blake, Hubert Parry, adapted by Emerson, Lake, Palmer	Brain Salad Surgery, 1973	2:44
5.	"Toccata" (Adaptation of Alberto Ginastera's 1st Piano Concerto)	Alberto Ginastera, arr. by Emerson	Brain Salad Surgery	7:21
6.	"Still...You Turn Me On"	Lake	Brain Salad Surgery	2:51
7.	"Karn Evil 9: 1st Impression, Part 1"	Emerson, Lake	Brain Salad Surgery	8:35
8.	"Karn Evil 9: 1st Impression, Part 2"	Emerson, Lake	Brain Salad Surgery	4:49
9.	"Jeremy Bender/The Sheriff" (Live medley)	Emerson, Lake	Welcome Back, My Friends, to the Show That Never Ends ~ Ladies and Gentlemen, Emerson, Lake & Palmer, 1974	5:02
10.	"I Believe in Father Christmas"	Lake, Peter Sinfield	Non-album single, 1975; later released on Works Volume 2, 1977	3:32
11.	"C'est la Vie"	Lake, Sinfield	Works Volume 1, 1977	4:17
12.	"Fanfare for the Common Man" (Edited version)	Copland, arr. by Emerson, Lake, Palmer	Works Volume 1	5:40
13.	"Honky Tonk Train Blues"	Meade "Lux" Lewis, arr. by Emerson	Non-album single, 1976; later released on Works Volume 2	3:12
14.	"Canario"	Joaquín Rodrigo	Love Beach, 1978	3:59
15.	"Peter Gunn" (Live version)	Henry Mancini, arr. by Emerson, Lake, Palmer	Emerson, Lake & Palmer in Concert, 1979	3:38
16.	"Black Moon"	Emerson, Lake, Palmer	Black Moon, 1992	6:58
17.	"Paper Blood"	Emerson, Lake, Palmer	Black Moon	4:27
