= List of ELP band members =

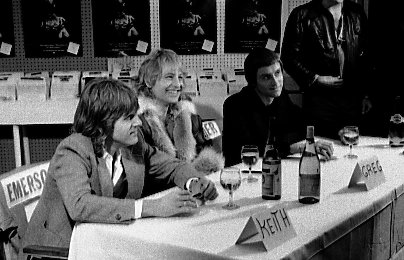
Emerson, Lake and Palmer in 1978

Emerson, Lake & Palmer were an English progressive rock supergroup formed in London in April 1970. The band consisted of Keith Emerson (keyboards), Greg Lake (vocals, bass, guitar and producer) and Carl Palmer (drums, percussion). The band were originally active from 1970 to 1979, and reformed several times after with different personnel and names, including Emerson, Lake & Powell with Cozy Powell (drums, percussion), in 1985 and 3 with Robert Berry (vocals, bass, guitars), in 1988, before finally reuniting the original line up from 1992 to 1998 and finally in 2010, before Emerson and Lake died in 2016.

== History ==
=== 1969–1979: Original run ===
The band originated in late 1969, when The Nice keyboardist Keith Emerson and King Crimson bassist and vocalist Greg Lake met when both groups were on tour. Emerson was looking to form a new band and Lake wished to leave King Crimson, and after initial discussions about the possibility of forming a group in New York City, the pair met two months later in December 1969 when The Nice and King Crimson were billed together for concerts at the Fillmore West in San Francisco. During a soundcheck before one of the shows, Emerson described the first time he and Lake played together: "Greg was moving a bass line and I played the piano in back and Zap! It was there." When the Nice split in March 1970 and Lake left King Crimson a month later, the pair began the search for a drummer, which turned out to be a difficult process. They initially approached Mitch Mitchell, who was at a loose end following the breakup of The Jimi Hendrix Experience and suggested a jam session take place amongst the three of them and guitarist Jimi Hendrix. The session never happened, but it caused the press to report rumours of a planned supergroup named HELP, an acronym for "Hendrix Emerson Lake Palmer", which Lake later debunked.

As part of auditions for a drummer at a studio by Soho Square, Emerson's manager, Tony Stratton Smith, suggested Carl Palmer of Atomic Rooster and previously The Crazy World of Arthur Brown. Palmer enjoyed the chemistry, though was initially reluctant as Atomic Rooster were starting to gain attention; it was only after several weeks of further sessions that Palmer agreed to join. Triton was a group name that Emerson said was buzzing around" for a little while, and Triumvirate and Seahorse were also in contention, but they settled upon Emerson, Lake & Palmer to remove the focus on Emerson as the most famous of the three, and to ensure that they were not called the "new Nice".

In the months surrounding their debut gigs, the band recorded their first album, Emerson Lake & Palmer, at Advision Studios. Lake took on the role of producer, which he had also done in King Crimson, with Eddy Offord as their engineer. The album included studio versions of "The Barbarian" and "Take a Pebble", "Knife-Edge", based on the first movement of Sinfonietta by Leoš Janáček and the Allemande of French Suite No. 1 in D minor by Johann Sebastian Bach, Palmer's drum solo "Tank", the three-part "The Three Fates", and "Lucky Man", an acoustic ballad that Lake wrote when he was twelve. The album was released in the UK in November 1970, and reached No. 4 in the UK and No. 18 in the US. "Lucky Man" was released as a single that peaked at No. 48 in the US.

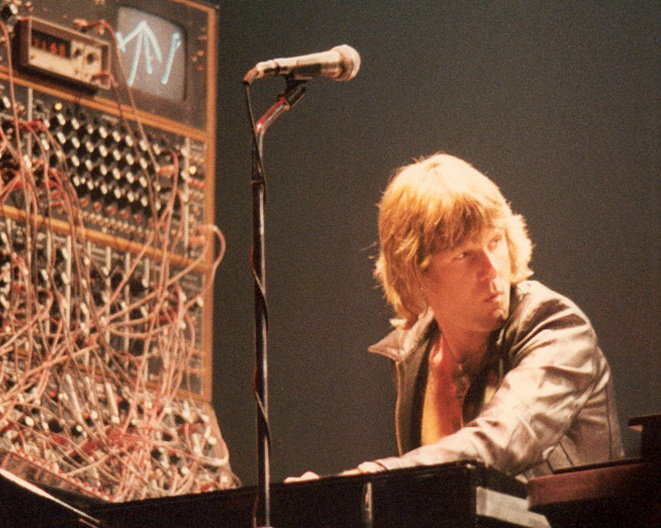
Emerson playing a Moog Modular Synthesizer in the 70s

From September 1970 to March 1971, the band completed their first concert tour with shows across the UK, Germany, Austria, and Switzerland. Their performance on 9 December 1970 at the Lyceum Theatre in London was filmed and released in UK theatres in 1972 with added psychedelic effects including characters from Marvel Comics.

Emerson, Lake & Palmer took an extended break in 1974. They regrouped in 1976 to record Works Volume 1 at Mountain Studios in Montreux, Switzerland and EMI Studios in Paris, France. It is a double album with one side of an LP containing songs by each member and a fourth of group material.

After their 1977–78 tour, the band discussed their next move. Emerson recalled that in order for the group to continue, "we would have to do a lot of cutting down" and considered the possibility of producing music with just a piano, bass guitar, and drums. As the group were contractually obliged to record one more studio album, the band relocated to Emerson's home near Nassau in the Bahamas and recorded Love Beach at the nearby Compass Point Studios in 1978. Lake did not carry out the production duties, leaving Emerson to complete the record on his own after his bandmates returned home when recording was complete. The album has been dismissed by the band, who explained it was produced to fulfil a contractual obligation.

=== 1985–1986: Emerson, Lake & Powell ===
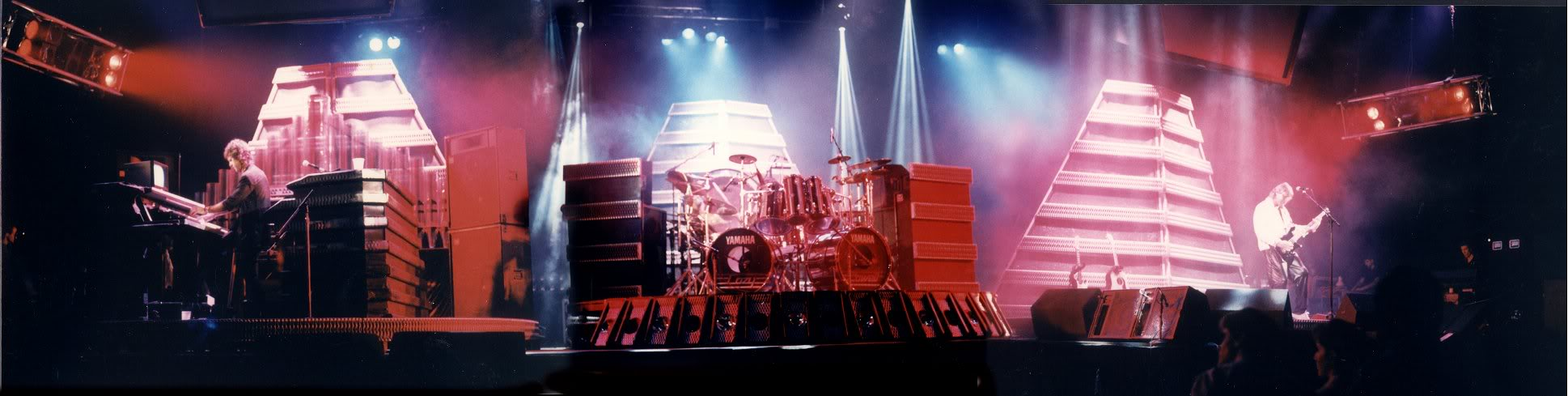
Emerson, Lake and Powell in 1986

Keith Emerson and Greg Lake had planned to re-form the original ELP in 1984, but drummer Carl Palmer was unavailable because of contractual obligations to Asia. After auditioning a series of drummers unwilling to commit to the band, they approached Cozy Powell, a longtime friend of Emerson's, to replace him. The band have always insisted that it was a coincidence that his surname also happened to start with a P, thus allowing the band to retain its original initials, although they also joked about looking for a "Gene Prupa" and having approached "Phil Pollins" and "Ringo Parr" before Powell agreed to join. Shortly into recording, Emerson's barn studio was destroyed by a runaway tractor, requiring some parts of the album to be rerecorded, leading him to joke, "Perhaps we should have called it 'Emerson, Lake & Plough!'"

The band's live tour was marred by a dispute which led to the band firing its management, and "ELPowell" disbanded without recording a second album.

=== 1988–1989, 2015: 3 ===
After Emerson, Lake & Powell split, Emerson reunited with Palmer and formed 3 with guitarist, bassist and singer Robert Berry in 1988. They performed live, as "Emerson and Palmer" (Berry was onstage but unnamed), at the Atlantic Records 40th Anniversary concert in 1988, broadcast on HBO, but only performed a long medley instrumental set including Fanfare for the Common Man, Leonard Bernstein's America, and Dave Brubeck's Blue Rondo, which later became an ELP encore in their 1990s concerts. They did not perform any original ELP material without Lake, nor did they perform any 3 songs since the band's label was Geffen Records.

3 performed at live venues to support their album, sometime in 1988. The three studio musicians were sometimes augmented by Paul Keller on guitar, Debra Parks and Jennifer Steele on backing vocals. Their setlist mainly consisted of material from their album, including "Runaway" and an extended jam version of the cover song "Eight Miles High". The group did a different arrangement of "Desde La Vida". The band did long instrumental jams based on music ELP covered including "Hoedown" & "Fanfare for the Common Man", but did not do any original ELP compositions. A long, elaborate cover of The Four Tops' "Standing in the Shadows of Love" was also included in the set.

Two live albums were released many years later, both on Rock Beat Records: Live Boston 88 (2015) and Live - Rockin' The Ritz (2017).

In October 2015, Emerson and Berry signed a contract with Frontiers Records to record a follow-up album at last, to be called 3.2. Emerson's death in March of the following year put a halt to that project. However, in July 2018, Berry released (as 3.2) The Rules Have Changed, built from musical ideas contributed by Emerson, but produced and performed entirely by Berry. A second 3.2 album, Third Impression, was released in 2021.

=== 1991–1998: Reformation of Emerson, Lake and Palmer ===
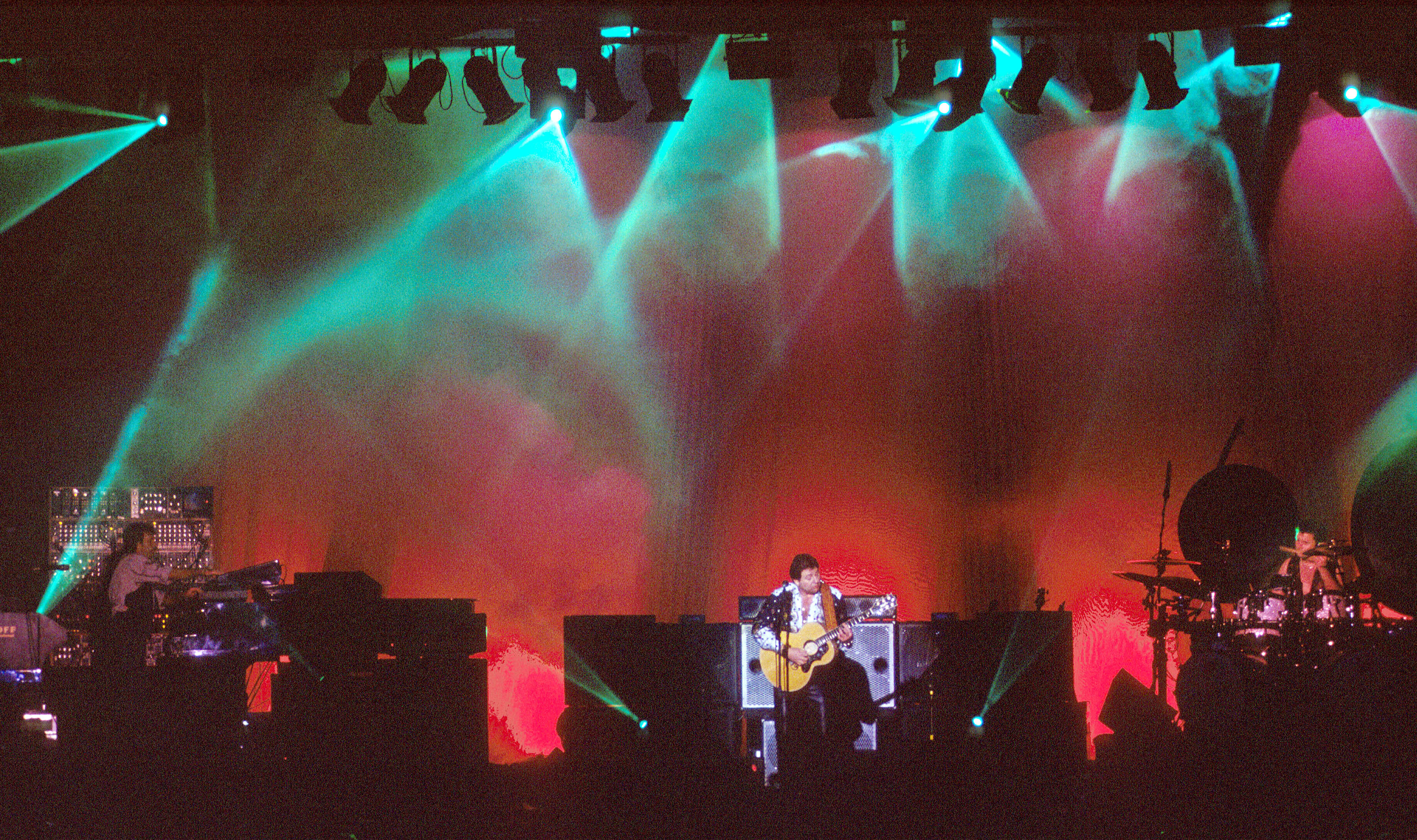
Emerson, Lake and Palmer in 1992

Thanks to Phil Carson, in 1991, Emerson, Lake & Palmer reformed and issued a 1992 comeback album, Black Moon, on Victory Music. Lake's voice had by this point noticeably deepened from years of heavy cigarette smoking. The bands 1992–93 world tours were successful, culminating in a performance at the Wiltern Theatre in Los Angeles in early 1993 that has been heavily bootlegged, but reportedly, Palmer suffered from carpal tunnel syndrome in one hand and Emerson had been treated for a repetitive stress disorder. In 1994, the band released a follow-up album, In the Hot Seat.

Emerson and Palmer eventually recovered enough to start touring again, beginning in 1996. Their tour schedules took them to Japan, South America, Europe, the United States and Canada, playing new versions of older work. They played in significantly smaller venues compared to their heyday (sometimes fewer than 500 people, as in Belo Horizonte, Minas Gerais, Brazil). Their last show was in San Diego, California, in August 1998. Conflicts over a new album led to another breakup.

=== 2010–2016: 40th anniversary concert and deaths of Emerson and Lake ===
In April 2010, Emerson and Lake embarked on a North American tour, presenting an acoustic repertoire of their work. On 14 May 2010, Shout! Factory released A Time and a Place, a 4-CD collection of Emerson, Lake & Palmer live tracks.

On 25 July 2010, Emerson, Lake & Palmer played a one-off 40th anniversary concert, headlining the High Voltage Festival event in Victoria Park, London. The entire concert was later released as the double-CD live album High Voltage. On 22 February 2011, Shout! released Live at Nassau Coliseum '78, a 2-CD set live recording of an Emerson, Lake & Palmer concert on 9 February 1978 at the Nassau Veterans Memorial Coliseum in Uniondale, New York.

On 29 August 2011, Emerson, Lake & Palmer released on DVD and Blu-ray ... Welcome Back My Friends. 40th Anniversary Reunion Concert. High Voltage Festival – 25 July 2010, the film of the 40th anniversary concert in Victoria Park, London. A Blu-ray and SD DVD of the concert was produced by Concert One Ltd, together with a definitive documentary of the band's 40-year history.

On 6 December 2011, Shout! Factory released Live at the Mar Y Sol Festival '72, a single-CD set live recording of an Emerson, Lake & Palmer concert on 2 April 1972 at the Mar Y Sol Festival, Vega Baja, Puerto Rico.

ELP signed a worldwide licensing deal with Sony Music Entertainment. In North America, the band moved to Razor & Tie. In 2015, Emerson, Lake & Palmer changed their worldwide distributor to BMG Rights Management.

Emerson died of a self-inflicted gunshot wound on 11 March 2016. Lake died from cancer on 7 December 2016.

== Members ==
=== Official ===
Image	Name	Years active	Instruments	Release contribution
	Keith Emerson	1970–1979; 1985–1986; 1988–1989; 1991–1998; 2010; 2010–2011 (died 2016)	keyboards; synthesizers	All releases
	Greg Lake	1970–1979; 1985–1986; 1991–1998; 2010; 2010–2011 (died 2016)	bass; guitar; vocals; production	All ELP and ELPowell releases
	Carl Palmer	1970–1979; 1988–1989; 1991–1998; 2010	drums; percussion	All ELP and 3 releases
	Cozy Powell	1985–1986 (died 1998)	drums; percussion	All ELPowell releases
	Robert Berry	1988–1989	bass; guitar; vocals; production; instrumentation (2018–present)	All 3 releases

=== Touring ===
Image	Name	Years active	Instruments	Notes
	Godfrey Salmon	1977	conductor	Performed on various live albums
	Paul Keller	1988–1989	guitar	Keller, Parks and Steele joined Emerson, Berry and Palmer on tour
	Debra Parks	1988–1989	backing vocals	Keller, Parks and Steele joined Emerson, Berry and Palmer on tour
	Jennifer Steele	1988–1989	backing vocals	Keller, Parks and Steele joined Emerson, Berry and Palmer on tour

=== Session ===
Image	Name	Years active	Instruments	Release contribution
	London Philharmonic Orchestra	1976	orchestra	Works Volume 1 (1977)
	John Mayer	1976	conductor	Works Volume 1 (1977)
	Joe Walsh	1976	guitars; vocals	Works Volume 1 (1977)
	Orchestre de l'Opéra national de Paris	1976	orchestra	Works Volume 1 (1977)
	Godfrey Salmon	1976	conductor	Works Volume 1 (1977)
	Peter Sinfield	1973; 1976–1978	lyrics	All ELP releases from Brain Salad Surgery (1973) to Love Beach (1978)
	Ron Aspery	1977	saxophone	Works Volume 2 (1977)
	Colin Hodgkinson	1977	bass	Works Volume 2 (1977)
	Graham Smith	1977	harmonica	Works Volume 2 (1977)
	Suzie O'List	1988	backing vocals	To the Power of Three (1988)
	Kim Liatt J. Edwards	1988	backing vocals	To the Power of Three (1988)
	Lana Williams	1988	backing vocals	To the Power of Three (1988)
	Bill Wray	1994	backing vocals	In the Hot Seat (1994)
	Paula Mattioli	1994	backing vocals	In the Hot Seat (1994)
	Kristen Olsen	1994	additional vocals	In the Hot Seat (1994)
	Tim Pierce	1994	additional guitars	In the Hot Seat (1994)
	Richard Baker	1994	additional keyboard programming	In the Hot Seat (1994)
	Brian Foraker	1994	additional keyboard programming	In the Hot Seat (1994)
	Keith Wechsler	1994	drum programming; additional keyboard programming	In the Hot Seat (1994)
	Fred White	1994	choir	In the Hot Seat (1994)
	Ricky Nelson	1994	choir	In the Hot Seat (1994)
	Lynn B. Davis	1994	choir	In the Hot Seat (1994)
	Linda McCrary	1994	choir	In the Hot Seat (1994)

== Line-ups ==
Period	Members	Studio Releases
1970–1979 Emerson, Lake and Palmer	Keith Emerson – keyboards, synthesizers; Greg Lake – bass, guitars, harmonica, vocals; Carl Palmer – drums, percussion; Additional Members: Peter Sinfield – lyrics (1973, 1976–1978); Joe Walsh – guitars, vocals (1977); Colin Hodgkinson – bass (1977); Ron Asprey – saxophone (1977); Graham Smith – harmonica (1977)	Emerson, Lake & Palmer (1970); Tarkus (1971); Pictures at an Exhibition (1971, live); Trilogy (1972); Brain Salad Surgery (1973); Welcome Back My Friends..(1974); Works Volume 1 (1977); Works Volume 2 (1977); Love Beach (1978); In Concert / Works Live (1979); The Return of the Manticore (1993) (tracks 19, 25, and 37); Live at the Isle of Wight Festival (1997); Then and Now (tracks 1–3 on disc 1) (1998); Live at the Mar Y Sol Festival '72 (2011); Live at Nassau Coliseum '78 (2011)
1979–1984 disbanded
1985–1986	Keith Emerson – keyboards, synthesizers; Greg Lake – bass, guitars, vocals; Cozy Powell – drums, percussion	Emerson, Lake & Powell (1986)
1988–1989 3 or Emerson, Berry and Palmer	Keith Emerson – keyboards, synthesizers; Robert Berry – bass, guitars, vocals; Carl Palmer – drums, percussion; Live members: Paul Keller – guitars; Debra Parks - backing vocals; Jennifer Steele – backing vocals	To the Power of Three (1988); The Rules Have Changes (2018); Third Impression (2021)
1992–1998	Keith Emerson – keyboards; Carl Palmer – drums, percussion; Greg Lake – bass, guitars, vocals; Session Members: Tim Pierce — additional guitars (1994); Bill Wray — backing vocals (1994); Lynn B. Davis ― backing vocals (1994); Paula Mattouili — backing vocals (1994); Linda McCray — backing vocals (1994); Rick Nelson — backing vocals (1994); Fred White — backing vocals (1994); Kristen Olsen — backing vocals (1994); Richard Baker — programming (1994); Brain Foraker — programming (1994); Keith Wechsler — programming (1994)	Black Moon (1992); The Return of the Manticore (1993) (tracks 1–6); Live at the Royal Albert Hall (1993); In the Hot Seat (1994); Then and Now (tracks 4–14) (1998)
1998–2009 disbanded
2010	Keith Emerson – keyboards; Greg Lake – bass, guitars, vocals	Live from Manticore Hall (2014, live in 2010)
2010	Keith Emerson – keyboards; Greg Lake – bass, guitars, vocals; Carl Palmer – drums, percussion	High Voltage (2010)
