= A Time and a Place =

Box set by Emerson, Lake & Palmer
- Released: 14 May 2010 & 20 July 2010
- Recorded: 1970–1998
- Genre: Progressive rock Symphonic rock
- Length: 300:26
- Label: Shout! Factory

Emerson, Lake & Palmer chronology
Gold Edition (2007)	A Time and a Place (2010)	Live at Nassau Coliseum '78 (2011)

Professional ratings
Review scores
Source	Rating
AllMusic	3.5/5 stars

A Time and a Place is a box set by Emerson, Lake & Palmer. It was released in 2010. The box set takes its name from the band's 1971 song "A Time and a Place".

== Background ==
The set brings together a select body of live performances captured before worldwide audiences during the band's career and tenure at the sharp end of the Progressive rock genre. It features high-quality soundboard recordings on the first three discs and audience recordings on the fourth. The collection has been praised by fans and in album reviews for the quality of the soundboard recordings, as well as the vast diversity of tracks featured on the discs. This collection is a part of a series of "official" bootleg releases by Shout! Factory and producer David Skye, with the blessing and participation of artists to provide fans with only the best performances, highest quality recordings, superior packaging and with original cover artwork designed by illustrator William Stout, internationally renowned as one of the first rock "n" roll bootleg cover artists. Other releases in the series include Iggy Pop's Roadkill Rising and Todd Rundgren's For Lack of Honest Work.

== Track listing ==
Disc 1 (The Early '70s)
No.	Title	Recording venue and date	Length
1.	"The Barbarian"	Isle of Wight Festival, 29 August 1970
2.	"Take a Pebble"	Beat-Club, 26 November 1970
3.	"Ballad of Blue"	Lyceum Ballroom, 9 December 1970
4.	"High Level Fugue"	Lyceum Ballroom, 9 December 1970
5.	"Hoedown"	Mar y Sol Pop Festival, 2 April 1972
6.	"Still...You Turn Me On"	Tulsa Civic Center, 7 March 1974
7.	"Lucky Man"	Tulsa Civic Center, 7 March 1974
8.	"Karn Evil 9 (1st, 2nd & 3rd Impressions)"	Anaheim Convention Center, 2 Feb 1974

Disc 2 (The Late '70s)
No.	Title	Recording venue and date	Length
1.	"Peter Gunn Theme"	Wheeling Coliseum, 18 November 1977
2.	"Pictures at an Exhibition"	Mid-South Coliseum, 20 November 1977
3.	"Tiger in a Spotlight"	Wheeling Coliseum, 18 November 1977
4.	"Maple Leaf Rag"	Wheeling Coliseum, 18 November 1977
5.	"Tank"	Nassau Coliseum, 9 February 1978
6.	"Drum solo"	Nassau Coliseum, 9 February 1978
7.	"The Enemy God Dances with the Black Spirits"	Nassau Coliseum, 9 February 1978
8.	"Watching Over You"	Wheeling Coliseum, 18 November 1977
9.	"Pirates"	Mid-South Coliseum, 20 November 1977
10.	"Tarkus"	Nassau Coliseum, 9 February 1978
11.	"Show Me the Way to Go Home"	Mid-South Coliseum, 20 November 1977

Disc 3 (The '90s)
No.	Title	Recording venue and date	Length
1.	"Knife-Edge"	Wiltern Theater, 17 March 1993
2.	"Paper Blood"	Obras Stadium, 5 April 1993
3.	"Black Moon"	Waterloo Village, 31 July 1992
4.	"Creole Dance"	Obras Stadium, 1 April 1993
5.	"From the Beginning"	Spodek, 22 June 1997
6.	"Honky Tonk Train Blues"	Universal Amphitheater, 25 Sep 1997
7.	"Affairs of the Heart"	Waterloo Village, 31 July 1992
8.	"Touch and Go"	Wiltern Theater, 17 March 1993
9.	"A Time and a Place"	Hampton Beach Casino Ballroom, 1 August 1998
10.	"Bitches Crystal"	Universal Amphitheater, 25 September 1997
11.	"Instrumental Jam"	Obras Stadium, 5 April 1993
12.	"Fanfare for the Common Man/America/Rondo"	Obras Stadium, 5 Apr 1993

Disc 4 (This Boot's for You – A Fan's View)
No.	Title	Recording venue and date	Length
1.	"Introduction"	Hollywood Bowl, 19 July 1971
2.	"The Endless Enigma"	Long Beach Arena, 28 July 1972
3.	"Abaddon's Bolero"	Louisville Town Hall, 21 April 1972
4.	"Jeremy Bender/The Sheriff"	Olympiahalle, 24 April 1973
5.	"Toccata (includes drum solo)"	Friedrich-Ebert-Halle, 10 April 1973
6.	"Jerusalem"	Henry Levitt Arena, 26 March 1974
7.	"Nut Rocker"	Boston Garden, 12 July 1977
8.	"C’est la Vie"	Boston Garden, 12 July 1977
9.	"Piano Concerto No. 1, 3rd Movement: Toccata con Fuoco"	Veterans Memorial Auditorium, 12 June 1977
10.	"Closer to Believing"	Veterans Memorial Auditorium, 12 June 1977
11.	"Close to Home"	Warfield Theatre, 14 March 1993
12.	"I Believe in Father Christmas"	Beacon Theatre, 17 November 1993

== Personnel ==
=== Band members ===
- Keith Emerson – keyboards
- Greg Lake – bass, guitar, vocals
- Carl Palmer – percussion, drums

=== Production ===
1. Compilation Produced by: David Skye
2. Remastered By: Randy Wine at MoonWine Studios
3. Package Design: Hackmart
4. Artwork: William Stout
5. Liner Notes: Jim Allen
6. Project Assistance: Keith Emerson and Tony Ortiz
