= From the Beginning (box set) =

Box set by Emerson, Lake & Palmer
- Released: 17 September 2007
- Genre: Progressive rock Symphonic rock
- Length: CD: 390:26; DVD: approx. 53 minutes
- Label: Sanctuary Records Group Ltd.
- Producer: Keith Emerson; Greg Lake; Carl Palmer

Emerson, Lake & Palmer chronology
The Essential Emerson, Lake & Palmer (2007)	From the Beginning (2007)	Gold Edition (2007)

From the Beginning is a box set which presents aural and visual documentation celebrating Emerson, Lake & Palmer's career; consisting of five discs that include a number of single b-sides, significant live recordings, alternative studio mixes and material taken from band rehearsals, plus a bonus DVD featuring 'The Manticore Years' documentary, presented in a deluxe book-style sleeve complete with a 60-page picture booklet containing extensive sleeve notes by the band discussing the ELP years. It also contains rare and previously unseen photographs and images.

== Track listing ==
=== Disc one ===
The 2012 reissue omits the first track (Epitaph). Its addition was done without permission from the rights holder, Discipline Global Mobile.

1. "Epitaph" – King Crimson (Robert Fripp, Michael Giles, Greg Lake, Ian McDonald, Peter Sinfield) – 8:45
2. "Decline and Fall" – Atomic Rooster (Vincent Crane, Carl Palmer, Nick Graham) – 5:47
3. "Fantasia: Intermezzo Karelia Suite" – The Nice (Jean Sibelius, arr. by Keith Emerson, Joseph Eger) – 8:51
4. "Lucky Man" (Lake) – 4:38
5. "Tank" (Emerson, Palmer) – 6:48
6. "Take a Pebble" (Lake) – 12:28
7. "The Barbarian" (Live version - Lyceum Theatre, 1970) (Emerson, Lake, Palmer, Béla Bartók) – 5:20
8. "Knife-Edge" (Live version - Lyceum Theatre, 1970) (Emerson, Lake, Leoš Janáček) – 8:01
9. "Rondo" (Live version - Lyceum Theatre, 1970) (Dave Brubeck, arr. by Emerson) – 18:18

=== Disc two ===
1. "Tarkus" – 20:40
  a) "Eruption" (Emerson)
  b) "Stones of Years" (Emerson, Lake)
  c) "Iconoclast" (Emerson)
  d) "Mass" (Emerson, Lake)
  e) "Manticore" (Emerson)
  f) "The Battlefield" (Lake)
  g) "Aquatarkus" (Emerson)
2. "Bitches Crystal" (Emerson) – 3:54
3. "A Time and a Place" (B-side single version) (Emerson, Lake, Palmer) – 3:55
4. "Oh, My Father" (Previously unreleased) (Lake) – 2:58
5. "The Endless Enigma (Part One)" (Emerson, Lake) – 4:04
6. "Fugue" (Emerson, Lake) – 4:54
7. "The Endless Enigma (Part Two)" (Emerson, Lake) – 2:00
8. "From the Beginning" (Lake) – 4:13
9. "Trilogy" (Emerson, Lake) – 8:52
10. "Abbadon's Bolero" (Emerson) – 8:07
11. "Hoedown" (Live version - Milan, 1973) (Aaron Copland, arr. by Emerson, Lake, Palmer) – 3:54
12. "Jerusalem" (First mix) (Hubert Parry, William Blake, arr. by Emerson, Lake, Palmer) – 2:54
13. "Still...You Turn Me On" (First mix) (Lake) – 2:51
14. "When the Apple Blossoms" (B-side single version) (Emerson, Lake, Palmer) – 3:56

=== Disc three ===
1. "Karn Evil 9" – 29:42
  a) "1st Impression Pt.1" (Emerson, Lake)
  b) "1st Impression Pt.2" (Emerson, Lake)
  c) "2nd Impression" (Emerson)
  d) "3rd Impression" (Emerson, Lake, Peter Sinfield)
2. "Jeremy Bender/The Sheriff" (Live) (Emerson, Lake) – 5:03
3. "C'est la Vie (Early version)" (Lake, Sinfield) – 4:16
4. "I Believe in Father Christmas" (Early version) (Lake, Sinfield, Sergei Prokofiev) – 3:29
5. "The Enemy God Dances with the Black Spirits" (Prokofiev, arr. by Palmer) – 3:20
6. "Piano Concerto No.1" (Emerson) – 18:25
  1. First Movement: "Allegro Giocoso"
  2. Second Movement: "Andante Molto Cantabile"
  3. Third Movement: "Toccata Con Fuoco"
7. "Pirates (Non-orchestral live version - Nassau Coliseum, 1978)" (Emerson, Lake, Sinfield) – 13:23

=== Disc four ===
1. "Aaron Copland Interview 1977" (From Keith Emerson's archives) – 1:37
2. "Fanfare for the Common Man" (Copland, arr. by Emerson, Lake, Palmer) – 9:42
3. "Honky Tonk Train Blues" (Lewis) – 3:09
4. "Tiger in a Spotlight" (Emerson, Lake, Palmer, Sinfield) – 4:33
5. "Watching Over You" (Lake/Sinfield) – 3:54
6. "Introductory Fanfare/Peter Gunn Theme (Live version)" (Emerson, Henry Mancini) – 4:26
7. "Canario (Rehearsal)" (Joaquín Rodrigo) – 3:57
8. "Mars – The Bringer of War" (Gustav Holst, arr. by Emerson, Lake, Cozy Powell) – 7:54
9. "Desede La Vida" (Emerson, Robert Berry, Palmer) – 7:06
  1. "Desede La Vida"
  2. "LaVista"
  3. "Sangre De Toro"
10. "Black Moon (Single version)" (Emerson, Lake, Palmer) – 4:47
11. "Footprints in the Snow" (Emerson, Lake, Palmer) – 3:51
12. "Romeo and Juliet (Live at the Royal Albert Hall, 1992)" (Prokofiev, arr. by Emerson) – 3:32
13. "Man in the Long Black Coat" (Bob Dylan, arr. by Emerson) – 4:12
14. "Daddy" (Lake) – 4:42
15. "Hang on to a Dream" (ELP cover of a song from The Nice) (Tim Hardin, Aber) – 4:28
16. "Touch and Go" (Live in Poland, 1997) (Emerson, Lake) – 3:53

=== Disc five ===
(Live from the Mar y Sol Pop Festival, Manatí, Puerto Rico, 2 April 1972)

1. "Hoedown" (Copland, arr. by Emerson, Lake, Palmer) – 4:18
2. "Tarkus" – 22:33
  a) "Eruption" (Emerson)
  b) "Stones of Years" (Emerson, Lake)
  c) "Iconoclast" (Emerson)
  d) "Mass" (Emerson, Lake)
  e) "Manticore" (Emerson)
  f) "The Battlefield" (Lake)
  g) "Aquatarkus" (Emerson)
3. "Take a Pebble" (Lake) – 4:36
4. "Lucky Man" (Lake) – 3:00
5. "Piano Improvisation - 'Take a Pebble' conclusion" (Emerson) – 9:44
6. "Pictures at an Exhibition" – 14:39
  a) "Promenade" (Modest Mussorgsky, Lake)
  b) "The Gnome" (Palmer)
  c) "Promenade – Vocal" (Mussorgsky, Emerson, Lake)
  d) "The Hut of Baba Yaga" (Mussorgsky, Emerson)
  e) "The Great Gates of Kiev" (Emerson, Lake)
7. "Rondo" (Brubeck, arr. by Emerson) – 18:29

=== Disc six ===
- "The Manticore Special" – DVD containing highlights from the 1973 World Tour.

- Written and directed by Nick Hague
- Edited by Chris Fraser
- Director of photography – John Rosenberg
- Production manager – Peter Jaques
- Sound recordist – Tony Jackson
- Produced by Miker Rosenberg

== Personnel ==
- Keith Emerson – keyboards (Hammond Organ, Mini Moog, Moog Modular, Grand Piano, Upright Piano)
- Greg Lake – guitars, bass guitar, vocals
- Carl Palmer – drums, percussion
