= The Return of the Manticore =

Box set by Emerson, Lake & Palmer
- Released: 13 December 1993
- Genres: Progressive rock, symphonic rock
- Length: 293:25
- Labels: Victory Music (1993 release); Rhino Records (reissue)
- Producers: Keith Emerson, Greg Lake, Carl Palmer, Eddy Offord

Emerson, Lake & Palmer chronology
Live at the Royal Albert Hall (1993)	The Return of the Manticore (1993)	In the Hot Seat (1994)

Professional ratings
Review scores
Source	Rating
AllMusic	4.5/5 stars
Entertainment Weekly	C−
MusicHound Rock	4/5 stars

The Return of the Manticore is a 4-disc retrospective on the career of the band Emerson, Lake & Palmer. It was released in 1993, and contains several new recordings of previously released songs, most notably a studio recording of "Pictures at an Exhibition", presented in Dolby surround sound. Also, a live recording of Dave Brubeck's "Blue Rondo à la Turk" appears on disc 2; the track, although performed by ELP in concert from the band's inception (as it had been by Keith Emerson's previous band The Nice), was previously unreleased on any live or studio album by ELP. This rendition was recorded at the Lyceum Theatre on 9 December 1970. The version of "Pirates" is a new, exclusive remix.

The box set is a fairly comprehensive cross-section of the band's history, offering tracks from all of ELP's studio and live albums (at the time of release), as well as new ELP renditions of hits previously recorded by bands they were members of prior to forming ELP.

The set's original release was part of a wave of remastered releases under the band's new label Victory Music. After that label became defunct, the set was re-released on Rhino Records.

== Track listing ==
Disc 1
No.	Title	Original release	Length
1.	"Touch and Go" (Emerson, Greg Lake)	1993 recording	3:01
2.	"Hang on to a Dream" (Tim Hardin)	1993 recording	4:27
3.	"21st Century Schizoid Man" (Robert Fripp, Michael Giles, Lake, Ian McDonald, Peter Sinfield)	1993 recording	3:07
4.	"Fire" (Arthur Brown, Vincent Crane, Peter Ker, Mike Finesilver)	1993 recording	3:24
5.	"Pictures at an Exhibition (Studio Version) a) "Promenade" (Modest Mussorgsky) b) "The Gnome" (Mussorgsky, Palmer) c) "Promenade" (Mussorgsky, Lake) d) "The Sage" (Lake) e) "The Hut of Baba Yaga" (Mussorgsky) f) "The Great Gates of Kiev" (Mussorgsky, Lake)"	1993 recording	15:33
6.	"I Believe in Father Christmas" (Lake, Sinfield)	1993 recording	3:26
7.	"Introductory Fanfare/Peter Gunn" (Emerson, Palmer, Henry Mancini)	Emerson, Lake and Palmer in Concert	4:27
8.	"Tiger in a Spotlight" (Emerson, Lake, Palmer, Sinfield)	Works Volume 2	4:32
9.	"Toccata" (Alberto Ginastera, arr. by Emerson, Palmer)	Brain Salad Surgery	7:20
10.	"Trilogy" (Emerson, Lake)	Trilogy	8:53
11.	"Tank" (Emerson, Palmer)	Emerson, Lake & Palmer	6:47
12.	"Lucky Man" (Lake)	Emerson, Lake & Palmer	4:37

Disc 2
No.	Title	Original release	Length
1.	"Tarkus a) "Eruption" (Emerson) b) "Stones of Years" (Emerson, Lake) c) "Iconoclast" (Emerson) d) "Mass" (Emerson, Lake) e) "Manticore" (Emerson) f) "Battlefield" (Emerson, Lake) g) "Aquatarkus" (Emerson)"	Tarkus	20:35
2.	"From the Beginning" (Lake)	Trilogy	4:14
3.	"Take a Pebble (Live version) a) "Take a Pebble (Beginning)" (Lake) b) "Lucky Man" (Lake) c) "Piano Improvisations" (Emerson) d) "Take a Pebble (Conclusion)" (Lake)"	Welcome Back My Friends to the Show That Never Ends... Ladies and Gentlemen	22:48
4.	"Knife-Edge" (music: Leoš Janáček arr. Emerson; lyrics: Lake, Richard Fraser)	Emerson, Lake & Palmer	5:05
5.	"Paper Blood" (Emerson, Lake, Palmer)	Black Moon	4:26
6.	"Hoedown" (Aaron Copland, arr. Emerson, Lake, Palmer)	Trilogy	3:43
7.	"Rondo (Live version)" (Dave Brubeck, arr. by Emerson)	Previously unreleased	14:28

Disc 3
No.	Title	Original release	Length
1.	"The Barbarian" (Béla Bartók, arr. Emerson, Lake, Palmer)	Emerson, Lake & Palmer	4:28
2.	"Still...You Turn Me On" (Lake)	Brain Salad Surgery	2:52
3.	"The Endless Enigma a) "The Endless Enigma Part 1" (Emerson, Lake) b) "Fugue" (Emerson) c) "The Endless Enigma Part 2" (Emerson, Lake)"	Trilogy	10:37
4.	"C'est la Vie" (Lake, Sinfield)	Works Volume 1	4:16
5.	"The Enemy God Dances with the Black Spirits" (Sergei Prokofiev, arr. by Emerson, Lake, Palmer)	Works Volume 1	3:21
6.	"Bo Diddley" (Emerson, Lake, Palmer)	Previously unreleased	5:03
7.	"Bitches Crystal" (Emerson, Lake)	Tarkus	3:55
8.	"A Time and a Place" (Emerson, Lake, Palmer)	Tarkus	2:57
9.	"Living Sin" (Emerson, Lake, Palmer)	Trilogy	3:12
10.	"Karn Evil 9 a) "1st Impression" (Emerson, Lake) b) "2nd Impression" (Emerson) c) "3rd Impression" (Emerson, Lake, Sinfield)"	Brain Salad Surgery	29:37
11.	"Honky Tonk Train Blues" (Meade "Lux" Lewis, arr. by Emerson)	Works Volume 2	3:11

Disc 4
No.	Title	Original release	Length
1.	"Jerusalem" (Hubert Parry, William Blake, arr. by Emerson, Lake, Palmer)	Brain Salad Surgery	2:44
2.	"Fanfare for the Common Man" (Copland, arr. by Emerson, Lake, Palmer)	Works Volume 1	9:40
3.	"Black Moon" (Emerson, Lake, Palmer)	Black Moon	6:58
4.	"Watching Over You" (Lake, Sinfield)	Works Volume 2	3:54
5.	"Piano Concerto No. 1 Third Movement: Toccata con Fuoco" (Emerson)	Works Volume 1	6:48
6.	"For You" (Lake, Sinfield)	Love Beach	4:27
7.	"Prelude and Fugue" (Friedrich Gulda)	Previously unreleased	3:15
8.	"Memoirs of an Officer and a Gentleman a) "Prologue/The Education of a Gentleman" (Emerson, Sinfield) b) "Love at First Sight" (Emerson, Sinfield) c) "Letters from the Front" (Emerson, Sinfield) d) "Honourable Company" (Emerson)"	Love Beach	20:12
9.	"Pirates" (Emerson, Lake, Sinfield)	Works Volume 1 (New remix)	13:18
10.	"Affairs of the Heart" (Lake, Geoff Downes)	Black Moon	3:46

== Personnel ==
- Keith Emerson: keyboards
- Greg Lake: vocals, acoustic and electric guitars, bass
- Carl Palmer: drums, percussion

== Production ==
Disc One

- Keith Olsen-Producer
- Brian Foraker-Engineer
- Greg Fulginiti-Mastering
