= Yamaha GX-1 =

Electronic music synthesizer

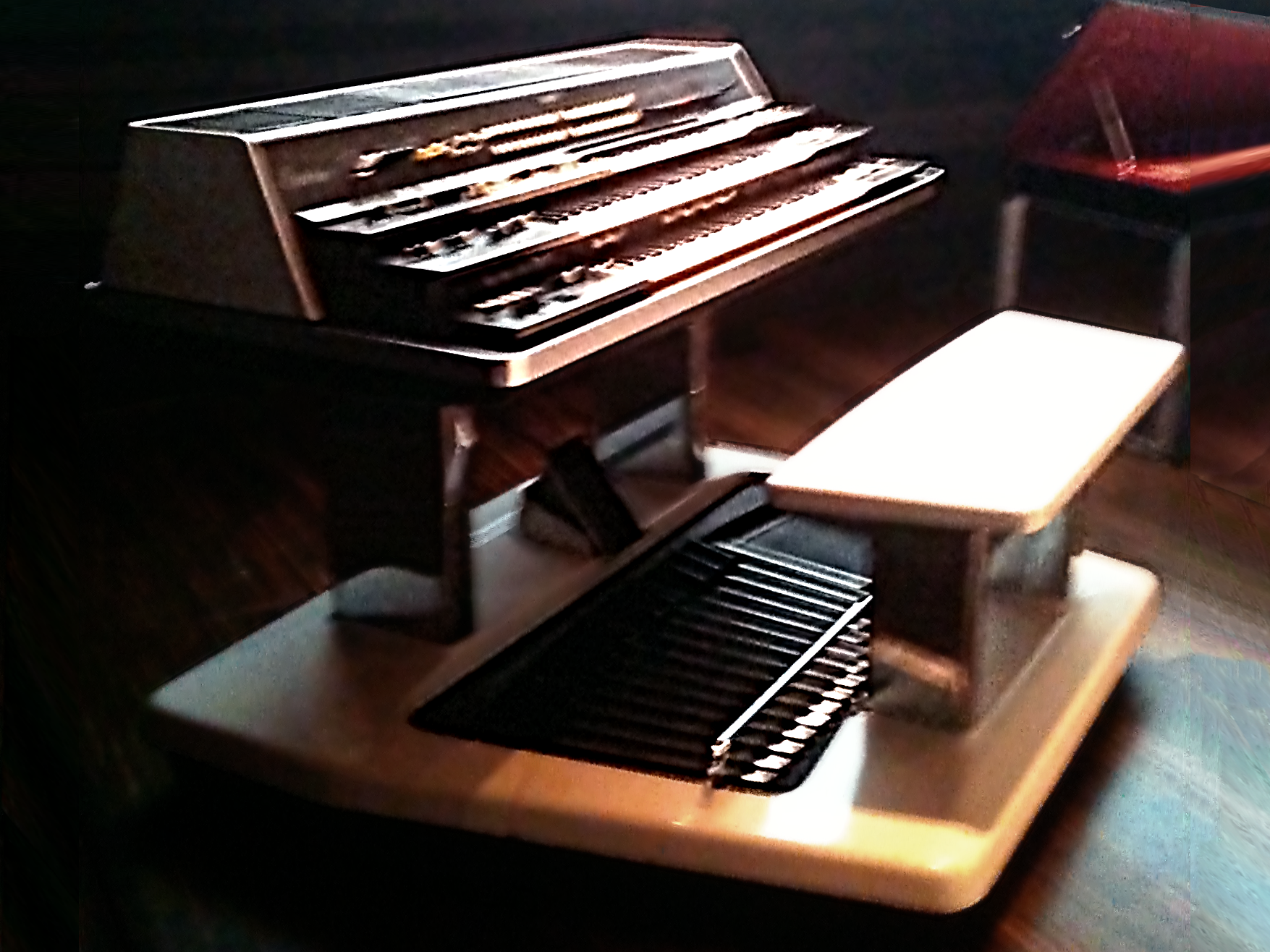
- Yamaha GX-1
- Manufacturer: Yamaha
- Dates: 1973/1975 - 1977
- Price: $60,000

Technical specifications
- Polyphony: 18 voices totally: 2 x polyphonic sections with 8 note dual-osc polyphony per section; Solo section single-osc monophonic; Pedal section with triple-osc monophonic
- Timbrality: 4
- Oscillator: Upper and Lower poly sections - 2 per voice; Solo section - 1; Pedal section - 3
- LFO: 3
- Synthesis type: Analog Subtractive
- Filter: voltage controlled 2-pole low-pass and high-pass filters per oscillator; static band-pass and high-pass filters on sawtooth and square waves only
- Attenuator: 2 envelope generators
- Effects: 2 x spring reverb

Input/output
- Keyboard: 1 x 61-key, horizontal aftertouch; 1 x 61 key; 37-key, velocity, vertical and horizontal aftertouch; 25 pedals
- External control: None

The Yamaha GX-1, first released as Electone GX-707, (Note: "Model GX-707 Electone". Electone Zone. Archived from the original on 2011-07-10. It's rumored that when Yamaha realized the model number shared the designation of Boeing 707 aircraft, they changed it to GX-1. Note the basic design of GX-1 followed the Electone EX-42 released in 1970.) is an analog polyphonic synthesizer developed by Yamaha as a test bed for later consumer synths and Electone series organs for stage and home use. The GX-1 has four synthesizer "ranks" or three manuals, called Solo, Upper, and Lower, plus Pedal, and an analog rhythm machine. The GX-707 first appeared in 1973 as a "theatre model" for use on concert stages, before the GX-1 was publicly released in 1975.

== Overview ==
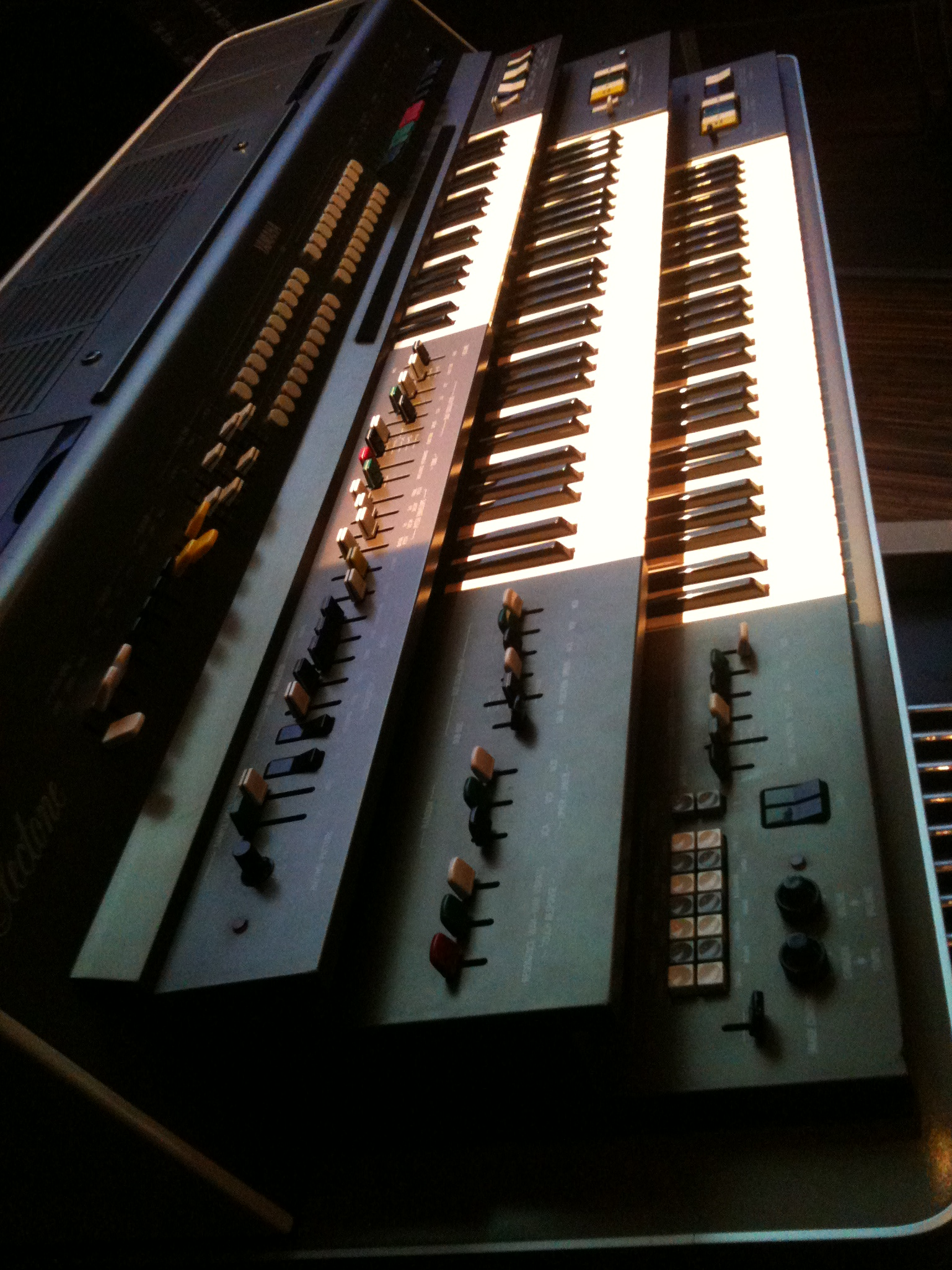
Yamaha GX-1 manuals

The Solo rank features a 3-octave keyboard with 37 keys that are full width but shorter than standard. Directly above the Solo keyboard runs the Portamento keyboard - a ribbon controller which can be used to play continuously variable pitches roughly corresponding to the Solo keyboard note below. The Portamento keyboard overrides the solo keyboard if used simultaneously. The Solo rank has only a single oscillator, but has a dedicated low-frequency oscillator (LFO), pitch envelope generator and ring modulator.

The Upper and Lower ranks each have a full-sized 5-octave, 61-note keyboard. They are both 8-voice polyphonic, with two oscillators per voice. Each poly rank has a dedicated LFO, and there is a common "random" modulation generator. The Upper rank also has horizontal aftertouch which can be assigned to pitch, volume or filter, and a polyphonic glide function.

The Pedal rank has a 25-note pedalboard. It is monophonic, with three oscillators but no LFO. Performance controls include a "swell" pedal with footswitch, and a spring-loaded knee controller.

All four ranks use a common voice-card design (called a tone generator in Yamaha parlance) to produce their sounds. Each voice card features a voltage-controlled oscillator with multiple waveforms, 2-pole high-pass and low-pass voltage controlled filters, and two envelope generators for filter modulation and VCA control. There is also a variable band-pass filtered sawtooth wave, and high-pass filtered square wave on each card. There are a total of 36 voice cards in a GX-1, containing 36 oscillators, 72 envelope generators, and 144 filters. Due to the extensive use of epoxy-potted sub-modules, a complete set of GX-1 voice cards alone weighs more than a Polymoog.

Preset sounds are stored on "tone modules" - small cartridges which each contain 26 fixed value resistor-dividers. These produce voltages which drive the voice cards, each resistor controlling one parameter of the sound. The tone modules are installed in compartments on the top panel of the synth. An optional "tone board" programmer could be inserted in place of a tone module, providing a full set of knobs, switches and sliders to control the parameters of a tone manually. Tones created this way could then be "programmed" onto a variable tone module using the Tone Module Setting Box. The Upper, Lower and Pedal ranks all have a dual-voice structure, where a different tone is assigned to each of the two voice cards per note. A set of hidden "wave motion" controls allows the second tones of the Upper and Lower ranks to be de-tuned. In the Pedal rank, the second tone is doubled on two voice-cards, both of which have a separate de-tune control.

The GX-1 console weighs 300 kg. The pedalboard and stand add 87 kg, and each of its tube-powered speakers, four of which can be connected to the GX-1, weighs 141 kg (Which together equals a total of 951 kg, or 2096 lb).

The GX-1 cost $60,000 (equivalent to $435,000 in 2025 adjusted for inflation) and was premiered in the US in 1973 at the NAMM Convention. The exact production number is unknown, but thought to total fewer than 100. At least 13 GX-1s are known to exist outside Japan, the remainder are presumed to have stayed in Japan.

== Notable users ==
A number of artists used the Yamaha GX-1 extensively in their recordings:

- Keith Emerson of Emerson, Lake & Palmer in their albums Works Volume 1, Works Volume 2, Love Beach, and In Concert, as well as various soundtrack projects in the late 1970s and early 1980s, including their eponymous Emerson, Lake & Powell album, as well as in the concert film of their 1977 Works Orchestral tour and in the music videos for "Fanfare for the Common Man" - filmed at the Montreal Olympic Stadium in winter - "Touch and Go" and "Black Moon". Emerson described touring with the GX-1 as a "roadie's nightmare" because of its 600 lb. mass. Hans Zimmer later bought one of Keith Emerson's old GX-1s.
- John Paul Jones of Led Zeppelin used a GX-1 on their 1979 album In Through the Out Door. Jones also used it on Led Zeppelin's 1979 concerts at Knebworth. He later sold his to Keith Emerson.
- Stevie Wonder is said to have bought two, one of which is on display at Madame Tussauds in Las Vegas. He referred to the GX-1 as the "Dream Machine" because of its three keyboards that allowed him to layer different sounds simultaneously and allowed him to create lush and very convincing orchestral sounds. Wonder used the GX-1 in particular on his 1976 album Songs in the Key of Life and his 1979 soundtrack album Journey Through "The Secret Life of Plants". One of the two is now owned by Pete Townshend of The Who.
- Benny Andersson of ABBA used a Yamaha GX-1 on several ABBA tracks as well as on tour. (Note: Notable uses are the synth bass intro to "Does Your Mother Know" and the string sections of many songs from the "Super Trouper" and "The Visitors" albums such as the opening of "Lay All Your Love On Me".) He still keeps it at his Riksmixningsverket studio in Stockholm, along with many other old synthesizers and keyboards.
- Hans-Jürgen Fritz of Triumvirat, a German progressive rock trio influenced by Emerson, Lake & Palmer.
- Rick van der Linden of Ekseption, whose solo album GX1 was played entirely on it.
- Bobby Lyle uses the Electone GX707 on his album Bobby Lyle Plays Electone GX707.
- Richard Wright of Pink Floyd allegedly owned one for a brief time, but it did not make an appearance on any recordings. It can be seen pictured in the album sleeve of Is There Anybody Out There? The Wall Live 1980–81.
- Richard D. James of The Tuss and Aphex Twin made a track named "GX1 solo", which was entirely composed with the Yamaha GX-1. Richard acquired the GX-1 from Mickie Most's estate after Most's death.
- Anoushiravan Rohani purchased a GX-1 in the mid-1970s and still has it today.
- The late Venezuelan organist and pianist Tulio Enrique León changed from a model C-3 Hammond organ to GX-1 in 1973. He used that instrument until his last recording in 1980.

== See also ==
- Electone

== Bibliography ==
- Guide To Your Yamaha Electone GX-1 (PDF). Hamamatsu, Japan: Nippon Gakki Co. Ltd. [Yamaha Corporation]. 1974.
  Yamaha GX-1 Owner's Manual.
- Jenkins, Mark (2009). Analog Synthesizers: Understanding, Performing, Buying--From the Legacy of Moog to Software Synthesis. Taylor & Francis. ISBN 978-1-136-12278-1.
- Jenkins, Mark (2019). "3. The birth of analog, the manufactures and the artists / Yamaha". Analog Synthesizers: Understanding, Performing, Buying--From the Legacy of Moog to Software Synthesis. Taylor & Francis. ISBN 978-0-429-84437-9.
- Reid, Gordon (February 2000). "Yamaha GX1 Synthesizer, Part 1". Sound on Sound. Archived from the original on 8 June 2015.
  Gordon Reid's article on the workings of the GX-1.
- Reid, Gordon (March 2000). "Yamaha GX1 Synthesizer, Part 2". Sound on Sound. Archived from the original on 21 December 2014.
  Gordon Reid's story on how he encountered his very own GX-1.
