= Gold Edition =

Box set by Emerson, Lake & Palmer
- Released: 2007
- Recorded: 1970–1997
- Genres: Progressive rock Symphonic rock
- Length: 126:56
- Label: Nun Entertainment Edel

Emerson, Lake & Palmer chronology
From the Beginning (2007)	Gold Edition (2007)	A Time and a Place (2010)

Gold Edition is a 3-disc box set by Emerson, Lake & Palmer released in 2007. The box set released in the UK under the label Nun Entertainment Edel and produced Greg Lake.

== Track listing ==
=== Disc 1 ===
1. "Take a Pebble"
2. "Lucky Man"
3. "Tarkus"
4. "Nut Rocker (Live)"
5. "Hoedown"

=== Disc 2 ===
1. "Trilogy"
2. "Still...You Turn Me On"
3. "Jerusalem (Live)"
4. "Pirates"
5. "Tiger in a Spotlight"
6. "All I Want Is You"
7. "The Gambler"

=== Disc 3 ===
1. "Pictures at an Exhibition (Live)"
2. "Black Moon"
3. "Better Days"
4. "Romeo and Juliet (Live)"
5. "Daddy"
6. "Karn Evil 9: 2nd Impression, Part 2 (Live)"
7. "Touch and Go (Live)"

== Personnel ==
- Keith Emerson – keyboards
- Greg Lake – bass, guitars, vocals
- Carl Palmer – percussion, drums
