= Tiger in a Spotlight =

Single by Emerson, Lake & Palmer

from the album Works Volume 2
- B-side: "So Far to Fall"
- Released: 28 December 1977
- Recorded: 1973
- Genre: Progressive rock
- Length: 4:02
- Label: Atlantic, Shout! Factory
- Songwriters: Keith Emerson, Greg Lake, Carl Palmer, Peter Sinfield
- Producers: Keith Emerson, Greg Lake, Carl Palmer, Peter Sinfield

Emerson, Lake & Palmer singles chronology
"C'est la Vie" (1977)	"Tiger in a Spotlight" (1977)	"Maple Leaf Rag" (1977)

"Tiger in a Spotlight" is a song by the progressive rock band Emerson, Lake & Palmer. It was recorded in 1973, but not released until 1977, when it was released on the album Works Volume 2. "Tiger in a Spotlight" was released as a single in Germany, and was added to the setlist for the 1978 tour.

== Reception ==
Vintagerock.com said that "Tiger in a Spotlight" was the most accessible song on Works Volume 2.

François Couture of AllMusic said that the song had more energy and excitement than most of the songs on the band's previous album, Works Volume 1. Couture also said that "Tiger in a Spotlight" is "one of the very few worthy group songs ELP recorded after the album Brain Salad Surgery."

Paul Stump, in his 1997 History of Progressive Rock, called the song "a cheesy plod [which] shows just how low the band's collective inspiration had sunk."

Paste magazine deemed the song one of the highlights on Works Volume 2.

== Other appearances ==
"Tiger in a Spotlight" has also been included on the live albums Emerson, Lake & Palmer in Concert, King Biscuit Flower Hour: Greatest Hits Live and Then and Now. The song has also been included on the compilation albums The Best of Emerson, Lake & Palmer and Gold Edition, as well as the box sets From the Beginning and The Return of the Manticore.
