= Fanfare for the Common Man (Emerson, Lake & Palmer song) =

- Front cover of Fanfare for the Common Man with the UK Atlantic Records catalogue number of K10946 to identify it.

Single by Emerson, Lake & Palmer

from the album Works Volume 1
- B-side: "Brain Salad Surgery"
- Released: 27 May 1977
- Genre: Progressive rock, instrumental rock
- Length: 9:46 (album version); 2:54 (single version)
- Label: Atlantic
- Songwriter: Aaron Copland
- Producer: Greg Lake

Emerson, Lake & Palmer singles chronology
"Jerusalem" (1973)	"Fanfare for the Common Man" (1977)	"C'est la Vie" (1977)

"Fanfare for the Common Man" is an instrumental piece of music adapted and played by the English progressive rock band Emerson, Lake & Palmer, from the group's 1977 Works Volume 1 album. Adapted by Keith Emerson from Aaron Copland's 1942 piece of the same name, it is one of their most popular and enduring pieces.

== Background ==
ELP had previously adapted Copland's "Hoedown" for the band's Trilogy album in 1972. Although ELP did not always initially attribute the classical source for some of their pieces (only attributed in later releases of the albums), Copland was attributed as the source for both "Hoedown" and "Fanfare". Unlike Bartók and Janáček, Copland was still alive at the time of the recording.

According to Keith Emerson,

...it needed transposing, so I did that first. I wanted to improvise in a key that was sort of bluesy. It ended up in E. The rest of it was straightforward, really. You know, in order to get the shuffle sound, the timing had to be changed, but it was common sense.

—

== Production ==
Greg Lake later described the first time ELP played the adaptation:

It was just wonderful how it came about: We were recording in Montreux, Switzerland, in 1976, and Keith was playing it as a piece of classical music. I played this shuffle bass line behind him and all of a sudden it started to connect. Then Carl came in and we three started to play it. Luckily, the engineer had a two-track running, and that is what's on the record - the first time we played through the piece.

—

In another interview, Lake said:

We got a very 'live' dirty R&B sound that was really incredible. And all done with one microphone. We hadn't played together for quite a while before that, apart from rehearsals and stuff. "Fanfare" was thoroughly jammed, from top to bottom.

—

While in Montreal, during their 1977 tour of America, the band was rehearsing in the basement of the Olympic stadium, the only space available sufficiently large to accommodate themselves and the orchestra. During a coffee break, Lake took the lift upstairs, and was struck by the spectacle of the empty stadium under a carpet of snow, and was inspired to hold a jam session in the unique environment. They organized for their equipment to be set up early the following morning, and a video recordist to document the proceedings. Despite the extreme cold, the trio, dressed in their warmest gear, completed a version of "Fanfare" in four separate "takes", filming each member individually, then one of the trio which, assembled, is available on several free to view services, YouTube and Dailymotion.

== Comparison to original ==
Emerson's adaptation begins very much the same as Copland's original piece, though at a slightly faster tempo, up to about the thirty-second mark, where a strong rhythm line from drums, bass and Emerson on the lower rank of the GX-1 begins. From that point, Emerson restates the theme before starting the modal solo (on the GX-1's solo rank) that so bewildered Copland at about the three-minute mark, returning to the main theme at the eight-minute mark.

There is some ambiguity as to whether real trumpets or the Yamaha GX-1 was used for the introductory trumpet part. Anecdotal evidence suggests it was the GX-1. When performed on some of the Works Live tour, "Fanfare" began and ended with real trumpets but the liner notes for the album Works Volume 1 show only the three band members and no other performers on that track.

== Reactions from Copland ==
Stewart Young, ELP's manager from 1972–present, made this comment on the documentary Beyond the Beginning:

The interesting thing... was that we had to get the permission of Aaron Copland, the composer. The publishing house said forget it. So I got Mr Copland's home number, called him up and he was very friendly on the phone. And he says "Send it to me, let me listen." And he loved it. He called me and said "This is brilliant, this is fantastic. This is doing something to my music."

—

In an interview with Melissa Merli of The News-Gazette, Emerson said: "I know that Aaron Copland for one admired my adaptation. The BBC radio people in England interviewed him shortly before he passed and got his opinion, and it was very complimentary."

In a BBC Radio interview, Copland relayed his reaction to the piece:

Interviewer: Just before I left London, I heard a piece of music of yours, Fanfare for the Common Man, which had been taken by a rock group Emerson, Lake & Palmer. How do you feel about that?

Copland: Well, (laughs) of course it's very flattering to have one's music adopted by so popular a group, and so good a group as Emerson, Lake & Palmer. A lot depends on what they do with what they take, and naturally since I have a copyright on such material, they're not able to take it without my permission; so that in each case, where I have given my permission, there was something that attracted me about the version that they perform, which made me think I'd like to allow them to release it. Of course, I always prefer my own version best, but (laughs) what they do is really around the piece, you might say, rather than a literal transposition of the piece, and they're a gifted group. In that particular case, I allowed it to go by because when they first play it, they play it fairly straight and when they end the piece, they play it very straight. What they do in the middle, I'm not sure exactly how they connect that with my music but (laughs) they do it someway, I suppose. But the fact that at the beginning and the end it really is the Fanfare for the Common Man gave me the feeling I ought to allow them to do it as they pleased.

Interviewer: I know your original work is just over three minutes and Emerson, Lake & Palmer have managed to turn it into a nine minute work.

Copland: (Laughs) Exactly, well, it's those six minutes in the middle...(laughs)

—

== Personnel ==
- Keith Emerson: Yamaha GX-1 polyphonic synthesizer
- Greg Lake: 8-string Alembic bass
- Carl Palmer: timpanis, drums

== Versions ==
An edited version, closer to Copland's original three minutes, was released May 1977 as a single and became ELP's most popular release, reaching number 2 in the UK Singles Chart. The "B" side of the single was the song Brain Salad Surgery, recorded during the sessions for the album of the same name but not released until Works Volume 2.

From the booklet that accompanies the Emerson, Lake & Palmer: Welcome Back My Friends, 40th Anniversary Reunion Concert DVD:

The instrumental reworking of Aaron Copeland's [sic] Fanfare for the Common Man became the third bestselling instrumental track ever and still holds that honour.

—

The compilations The Return of the Manticore, The Ultimate Collection, From the Beginning, Fanfare for the Common Man - Anthology, Come and See the Show - The Best of Emerson Lake & Palmer and The Very Best of Emerson, Lake & Palmer feature the full version but the compilation The Best of Emerson, Lake & Palmer includes the single version. The Essential Emerson, Lake & Palmer contains a third version, running five minutes and forty seconds.

On the live recording Emerson, Lake and Palmer in Concert (later released as Works Live), the performance begins and ends with the orchestra that the band took with them for some of the 1977 tour supporting the release of the Works Volume 1 album.

ELP is also known to combine their rendition of Fanfare with other pieces, such as during their performances Live at the Royal Albert Hall and Live in Poland, which end with a piece titled "Finale" or "Medley" that contains "Fanfare" and adaptations called "America" (based on "America" by Leonard Bernstein and Stephen Sondheim) and/or "Rondo" (based on "Blue Rondo à la Turk" by Dave Brubeck), both of which were played by Emerson when he was in the band The Nice.

== Performances by ELP and by others ==
This arrangement was an opening theme song for the CBS Sports Spectacular. It is also used by Australia's Seven Network as a theme song for their sports programmes. It was also used in the 1993 Valvoline 200 during the intro segment.

"Fanfare" became a staple of ELP's concerts, and, while the opening and closing portions of the piece follow the recorded version fairly closely, Emerson's "modal" solo varied from one performance to another.

"Fanfare" has also been performed by the band members in other bands, including:

- Emerson performed "Fanfare" in 1990 with John Entwistle, Joe Walsh, Jeff Baxter and Simon Phillips on tour in Japan as the supergroup The Best; with his old band The Nice in Glasgow on a tour in 2002; at the Ahmet Ertegun Tribute Concert in 2007 with Yes band members Chris Squire and Alan White; and with the Keith Emerson Band.
- Emerson and Palmer performed it together in concert as part of the band 3 with Robert Berry on guitar, but not on the band's 1988 release To the Power of Three.
- Emerson and Lake performed "Fanfare" in concert as part of the band Emerson, Lake & Powell, but not on the band's self-titled studio album.
- Lake also performed "Fanfare" in concert but with none of the other original members performing.
- Palmer has performed "Fanfare" in concert, including a reunion concert with Asia, with Geoff Downes on keyboards, Steve Howe on guitar and John Wetton on bass and with an Asia spin-off called Qango. Palmer has also presented a show entitled Carl Palmer & His Band – Celebrates The Music of Emerson Lake & Palmer, which features a version of "Fanfare", amongst other ELP pieces. Palmer's band consists of himself on drums, guitarist Paul Bielatowicz and bassist Simon Fitzpatrick. Palmer performed "Fanfare" with the BBC Concert Orchestra at the Royal Albert Hall for the opening number of the BBC Proms' Prog Rock: A Fanfare for the Common Man concert in 2026.
- Emerson worked with producer Mike Bennett on Reworks: Brain Salad Perjury in 2007, which consists of remixes of ELP songs, including two versions of "Fanfare".

An ELP tribute act called Fanfare includes "Fanfare for the Common Man" in their shows.

Italian organist Marco Lo Muscio has performed an arrangement of Emerson's adaptation of "Fanfare" on numerous church organs

== Charts ==
=== Weekly charts ===
Chart (1977)	Peak position
Australian Singles (Kent Music Report)	5
UK Singles (Official Charts)	2

=== Year-end charts ===
Chart (1977)	Position
Australian Singles (Kent Music Report)	33

== Certifications ==
Region	Certification	Certified units/sales
United Kingdom (BPI)	Silver	250,000^{^}
^{^} Shipments figures based on certification alone.
