= Show Me the Way to Go Home =

1925 song

"Show Me the Way to Go Home" is a popular song written in 1925 by the English songwriting team Jimmy Campbell and Reg Connelly, using the pseudonym "Irving King". The song is said to have been written on a train journey from London by Campbell and Connelly. They were tired from the traveling and had a few alcoholic drinks during the journey, hence the lyrics. The song is in common use in England, Ireland, Scotland, Wales and North America.

== Publication ==
The music and lyrics were written in 1925 by Jimmy Campbell and Reg Connelly. They self-published the sheet music and it became their first big success, selling 2 million copies and providing the financial basis of their publishing firm, Campbell, Connelly & Co. Campbell and Connelly published the sheet music and recorded the song under the pseudonym "Irving King".

The song was recorded by several artists in the 1920s. The first recordings, in 1925, were by Hal Swain's New Princes' Toronto Band – a group of Canadian musicians working in London – and by American-born male impersonator Ella Shields, in both cases for the Columbia label in London. Other recordings were made by radio personalities The Happiness Boys, Vincent Lopez and his Orchestra, and the California Ramblers. Throughout the twentieth into the twenty-first century it has been recorded by numerous artists.

== Lyrics ==
Show me the way to go home,
I'm tired and I want to go to bed,
I had a little drink about an hour ago,
And it's gone right to my head,
Wherever I may roam,
On land or sea or foam,
You will always hear me singing this song,
Show me the way to go home.

=== Parodies ===
Parodies popular on Midwest American campuses in the 1950s went:

Indicate the way to my abode
I'm fatigued and I want to retire
I imbibed a few about sixty minutes ago
And it percolated right through my cerebellum
Wherever I may perambulate
O'er land or sea or atmospheric vapor
You will always hear me rendering this melody
Indicate the way to my abode

or

Indicate the way to my abode
I'm fatigued and I wish to retire
I had a spot of beverage sixty minutes ago
And its risen right up to my cranium
No matter wherever I may perambulate
On land or sea or atmospheric vapour
You can always hear me chanting the melody
Indicate the way to my abode

or, there is the drunker second stanza

Home me the way to go show
I'm bed and I want to go to tired
I had a little hour about a drink ago
And it's gone right to my cerebellum
Wherever I may roam
Over land or sea or agitated water
You can always sing me finding a song
Home me the way to go show

Some similar versions substitute "terra firma" for land and/or "aqueous precipitate" for foam.

== Literature ==
- George Orwell references the song in his 1934 novel Burmese Days.
- Norman Mailer's 1948 novel The Naked and the Dead references the song several times.
- Brick, a main character of the Tennessee Williams 1955 play Cat on a Hot Tin Roof, sings this song toward the end while drinking liquor, leaving out the line "And it's gone right to my head" and the last two lines due to dialogue between other characters.
- In Truman Capote's 1956 short story "A Christmas Memory", Miss Sook sings a line from the song.
- Albert Wendt references the song, slightly and purposefully revising it in his first novel, Sons For the Return Home (1973).
- In Edna O’Brien’s 1978 short story collection Mrs Reinhardt and Other Stories, the doctor in A Woman by the Seaside says a line from the song when drunk, changing it to “I took a little drink about an hour ago […] and it’s gone right through my head.”
- In Terry Pratchett's 1995 novel Maskerade, the witches hear this song being sung by a neighbour taking an evening bath, and are surprised when he switches from English to Italian when he thinks he is being overheard. When he believes the coast is clear, he switches back to English.
- In Buddhadeb Guha's novel Ektu Ushnatar Jonye, a character named Pat Glaskin is found to sing this song at the end of the novel.
- The singing of this song by Pat Glaskin has been referred to by the author himself in his Rijuda story Rijudar songe Mccluskiegunje. Here, Rijuda is found to be singing the song after having dinner and drinks with a foreign married couple in Mccluskiegunj.
- In William Steig’s children’s book, ‘’Zeke Pippin‘’, the protagonist, a runaway pig named Zeke, once he has realized his mistake and survived encounters with a gang of outlaw dogs and with a howling coyote, plays the tune on his harmonica as he turns for home again.

== Film ==
- The first two lines of the song are shown on screen in King Vidor's silent film, The Crowd (1928) after a scene where John goes to borrow some liquor from Bert but decides to stay and drink and dance with Bert and the two women at Bert's house instead of going home to spend Christmas Eve with his wife and her family.
- This song was the basis for a 1932 Screen Songs animated short by Fleischer Studios.
- In the movie Hell Below (1933), it is sung by Lt. JG "Brick" Walters, played by Robert Young.
- On a street scene in Beauty for Sale (1933), a strolling trio of youths sing it.
- Sung by the cast in Husbands (1970)
- In Jaws (1975), the song is sung by Brody (Roy Scheider), Quint (Robert Shaw), and Hooper (Richard Dreyfuss) at night on board the Orca.
- Oliver Statham sings it as he completes a record-breaking cave dive in The Underground Eiger (1979), a British documentary.
- In a stolen car scene from Eat My Dust! (1976) starring Ron Howard.
- Mary Jones (Jennifer Holmes) sings it briefly near the end of The Demon (1981).
- It is sung by an old man in the jail in A River Runs Through It (1992) when Paul is picked up by his brother.
- In the Woody Allen film Cassandra's Dream (2007), Terry (Colin Farrell) and Ian (Ewan McGregor) sing this song on the maiden voyage of their boat.
- In the opening scene of Piranha 3D (2010), Richard Dreyfuss (reprising/spoofing his character of Matt Hooper from Jaws) listens to this song as well as singing along.
- In The Battery (2012), Ben (Jeremy Gardner) and Mickey (Adam Cronheim) drunkenly sing the lyrics of the song while trapped in a car.
- Towards the end of This Beautiful Fantastic (2015), Milly (Eileen Davies) sings a few lines from this song when she is accompanied home by Bella (Jessica Brown Findlay).
- A group of people in a shelter during a World War II bombing of London are singing this song, in the movie Blitz (2024)

== Television ==
- In a 1953 episode of Philco Television Playhouse, titled "Ernie Barger is 50", Ernie Barger (Ed Begley) sings the song repeatedly throughout (written by Tad Mosel - Directed by Delbert Mann).
- In a 1961 episode of Coronation Street, the character Harry Hewitt sings a portion of this song in a drunken stupor.
- In the 1962 opening episode of the World War II series Combat!, entitled "Forgotten Front", Albert Paulsen plays a captured German soldier who shows his love for American music by singing this song.
- In the 1968 NBC Monkees TV special 33⅓ Revolutions per Monkee, Davy Jones sings this during the "Listen To The Band/Chaos" segment.
- In a 1970s Sesame Street sketch, a Muppet cow sings the song's opening line repeatedly as she looks for the right kind of home for herself.
- In the 1976 BBC series Doctor Who, the eponymous hero awakens in episode two of The Brain of Morbius and mutters, "I had a little drink about an hour ago".
- In the 1978 BBC series Connections episode The Trigger Effect, a group of subway passengers sings part of this song during a power blackout.
- In the 1988 BBC2 Red Dwarf episode "Thanks for the Memory, the main characters get drunk and sing the song while piloting a shuttle back to their ship, altering the words "And it's gone right to my head" with "To celebrate Rimmer's death".
- In a 1991 episode, in a season 3 episode of America's Funniest Home Videos, Bob Saget remarks about a video, "Yet another version of 'Show Me the Way to Go Home'."
- In the 1994 series Chespirito episode "Show Me The Way To Go Home", the characters sing and dance to this song.
- In the 1998 English dub of the Pokémon episode "Showdown at the Po-ké Corral", James says "Show me the way to go home. I'm tired and I want to go to bed."
- In the 1998 Babylon 5 episode "Meditations on the Abyss", Garibaldi is singing this to himself while he is very drunk.
- In the 1999 Family Guy episode "Mind Over Murder", Stewie is intoxicated and singing this song.
- In a 2004, season 3 episode of Lost, entitled "Stranger in a Strange Land", Sawyer sings this while paddling a boat with Kate back to the main island.
- In the English dub version of Ghost Stories, one of the main characters uses this song as a chant to trap a ghost.
- In the 2015 final episode of The Heavy Water War, Julie sings this song at a farewell party for the Norwegians.
- In the 2018 NCIS episode “Third Wheel”, the song is repeated many times by a character named Philip Brooks, played by Don Lake. At the end of the episode, Brooks finally convinced Fornell and Gibbs to join in.
- In 2022, in a season 2 episode of The Wilds, Seth sings the song while on the boat with Raf and Kirin, supposedly seeking rescue, while asking them if they know the movie reference.
- In 2023, in a Season 1, Episode 8 of Bupkis, Pete Davidson, Machine Gun Kelly and Paul Hauser sing this song loudly at rehab and get in trouble.
- In 2025 Battle of the Eras Episodes 18 and 19 the players must count 1000s of different coins before sleeping. Every 30 minutes they are forced to pause their counts to sing the "shanty" for 30 minutes before they resume their counts.

== Football ==
Supporters of Wimbledon F.C. / AFC Wimbledon have sung an adapted version reflecting their team spending 25 years away from their Plough Lane home stadium:

Show Me The Way To Plough Lane,
I'm tired and I want to go home
I had a football ground twenty years ago,
And I want one of my own.
Whenever I may roam,
To Selhurst Park again,
You will always hear me singing this song,
Show me the way to Plough Lane

Supporters of Liverpool FC sing a version "Show them the way to go home" to mock the away team and away fans that are visiting Anfield stadium:

Show them the way to home
They're tired and they want to go to bed (for a wank)
Cos they're only half a football team
Compared to the boys in red

== Theme parks ==
At Universal Studios Florida, in the Wizarding World of Harry Potter Diagon Alley, there is a window of animated shrunken heads. They banter with each other and often break into "Show Me The Way To Go Home". It is also one of the spots where one can use an interactive wand and use the Silencio wand movement to make them stop singing and make muffled sounds as if they suddenly can't move their lips. It is located across from Borgin & Burke's gift shop and next to the Dystal Phaelanges skeleton display. This along with several other design details throughout the Harry Potter themed section are a tribute to the former Jaws attraction, which closed on January 2, 2012 and was replaced by Diagon Alley in 2014.

== Recordings ==
- Frank Crumit recorded a version of the song in 1926.
- Julie London recorded a version of the song for her 1968 album Easy Does It.
- Jefferson Starship covered the song live during shows of their Acoustic Explorer / Acoustic Shuttlecraft incarnation in 1996–1998.
- Emerson, Lake & Palmer included their version of the song on their 1977 album Works Volume II.
- Shai Hulud sings the song as a group as the hidden track on their album Hearts Once Nourished with Hope and Compassion.
- Bono, the lead singer of the band U2, used the song several times whilst in the guise of the stage character Macphisto in the band's Zoo TV Tour in 1992–93.
- Michael McCormack and guitarist Greg Parker recorded a version of the song for the end titles of the Jaws documentary The Shark Is Still Working:The Impact & Legacy of Jaws.
- Squalus covered the song on their 2017 album The Great Fish.
- Max Bygraves recorded a version of the song for his 1975 album Singalong With Max.
- Minnie Birch recorded a version for You're Not Singing Anymore, an EP of folk football songs
