= Meade Lux Lewis =

American boogie-woogie pianist and composer (1905–1964)

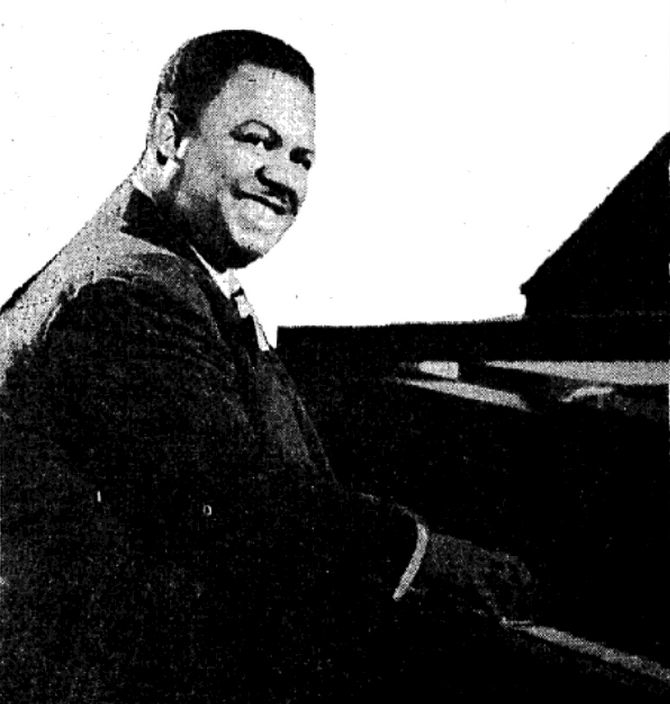
- Lewis in a 1944 advertisement

Background information
- Born: Anderson Meade Lewis; September 4, 1905; Chicago, Illinois, U.S.
- Died: June 7, 1964 (aged 58) Minneapolis, Minnesota, U.S.
- Genres: Boogie-woogie; piano blues
- Occupation: Musician
- Instrument: Piano
- Years active: 1920s–1964
- Labels: Paramount; Parlophone; Blue Note; Decca; Asch; Vocalion; V-Disc; Victor; Solo Art

Anderson Meade "Lux" Lewis (September 4, 1905 – June 7, 1964) was an American pianist and composer, remembered for his playing in the boogie-woogie style. His best-known work, "Honky Tonk Train Blues", has been recorded by many artists.

== Biography ==
Lewis was born in Chicago, though some sources state Louisville, Kentucky, on September 4, 1905 (September 3 and 13 have also been cited as his date of birth in sources). In his youth he was influenced by the pianist Jimmy Yancey.

His father, a guitarist who made two recordings of his own, introduced Meade to music and arranged for him to have violin lessons. He gave up the violin at age 16, shortly after his father's death, and switched to the piano. The nickname "Lux" was given to him by his boyhood friends. He would imitate a couple of characters from a popular comic strip in Chicago, Alphonse and Gaston, and stroke an imaginary beard as part of the routine. His friends started calling him the Duke of Luxembourg because of this, and the name stuck for the rest of his life. He became friends with Albert Ammons during childhood, a friendship that would last throughout their lives. They went to the same school together briefly, and they practiced and learned the piano together on the Ammons family piano.

A 1927 rendition of his composition "Honky Tonk Train Blues”, released by Paramount Records, marked his recording debut. He remade it for Parlophone in 1935 and for Victor in 1937, and a recording exists of a radio show, Camel Caravan, broadcast from New York City in 1939, which includes "Honky Tonk Train Blues". His performance at John Hammond's historic From Spirituals to Swing concert at Carnegie Hall in 1938 brought Lewis to public attention. Following the event, Lewis and two other performers from that concert, Albert Ammons and Pete Johnson, often appeared as a trio, and became the leading boogie-woogie pianists of the day.

They had an extended engagement at Café Society, toured as a trio, and inspired the formation of Blue Note Records in 1939. Their success led to a decade-long boogie-woogie craze, with big-band swing treatments by Tommy Dorsey, Will Bradley, and others; and numerous country boogie and early rock-and-roll songs.

In 1941 Lewis played the piano-like Celeste (also called Celesta) in Edmond Hall's Celeste Quartet.

Lewis appeared in the movies New Orleans (1947) and Nightmare (1956). He also appeared, uncredited, in the movie It's a Wonderful Life (1946), playing piano in the scene where George Bailey gets thrown out of Nick's Bar.

Lewis was fond of the Minneapolis area, where a niece lived, and would visit as often as he could. He appeared annually at the White House Restaurant (no longer extant) in Golden Valley. He began a successful three-week engagement there in May 1964. Around 2 a.m. on Sunday, June 7, Lewis left the parking lot of the White House and headed east on Olson Memorial Highway, when his Chrysler Imperial was rear-ended by a vehicle driven by Ronald Bates, who was traveling an estimated 80 mph. Lewis's car was pushed 400 feet and crashed into a tree; he was killed instantly. He was 58. Bates survived, but his passenger died the following day.

== Legacy ==
Lewis' best-known work, "Honky Tonk Train Blues”, has been recorded in various contexts, often in a big band arrangement. Early recordings of the piece by artists other than Lewis include performances by Adrian Rollini, Frankie Trumbauer, classical harpsichordist Sylvia Marlowe, theater organist George Wright (with drummer Cozy Cole, under the title "Organ Boogie"), and Bob Zurke with Bob Crosby's orchestra. Keith Emerson of Emerson, Lake & Palmer often included "Honky Tonk Train Blues" in the band's live performances. He also recorded it as a solo single in 1976, which later appeared on Emerson, Lake & Palmer's 1977 album Works Volume 2.

Lewis was mentioned in Chapter 81 of author Kurt Vonnegut's novel Cat's Cradle. Lewis is also mentioned in Ross Macdonald's novel The Moving Target and in Keith Richards's autobiography Life.

== Discography ==
- 1941: Boogie Woogie (compilation), Columbia C44
- 1955: Boogie Woogie Piano and Drums, Clef
- 1956: Out of the Roaring Twenties with Meade Lux Lewis ABC Paramount ABC 164
- 1961: The Blues Piano Artistry of Meade Lux Lewis AKA Meade Lux Lewis Solo Riverside Records (RLP 402) https://www.jazzdisco.org/riverside-records/discography-1961/
- 1975: Tell Your Story, Oldie Blues OL 2805
- 1982: Giant of Blues and Boogie Woogie 1905–1964, Oldie Blues OL 2810
- 1984: Chicago Piano Blues and Boogie Woogie 1936–1951 Vol. 3, Oldie Blues OL 2827
