= Emerson, Lake & Palmer in Concert =

Emerson, Lake and Palmer in Concert

Live album by Emerson, Lake & Palmer
- Released: 16 November 1979
- Recorded: 26 August 1977; Olympic Stadium, Montreal, Quebec, Canada and 12 November 1977, Civic Center, Wheeling, West Virginia
- Genres: Progressive rock, symphonic rock
- Length: 43:12 (In Concert); 87:39 (Works Live); 86:53 (DVD); 102:40 (Live in Montreal 1977)
- Label: Atlantic
- Producer: Keith Emerson

Emerson, Lake & Palmer chronology
Love Beach (1978)	Emerson, Lake and Palmer in Concert (1979)	The Best of Emerson, Lake & Palmer (1980)

Emerson, Lake & Palmer live chronology
Welcome Back My Friends to the Show That Never Ends - Ladies and Gentlemen (1974)	Emerson, Lake & Palmer in Concert (1979)	Live at the Royal Albert Hall (1993)

Singles from In Concert
- 1. "Peter Gunn" Released: December 1979

Professional ratings
Review scores
Source	Rating
MusicHound Rock	(Works Live)
Music Week	4/4 stars

Emerson, Lake and Palmer in Concert (also known as simply In Concert) is a live album by Emerson, Lake & Palmer (ELP), recorded at their 26 August 1977 show at the Olympic Stadium, Montreal, Quebec, Canada which is featured on the album cover. It was released by Atlantic Records in November 1979, following ELP's breakup. It was later re-released and repackaged as Works Live in 1993. Some of the tracks were not from the Montreal concert. "Peter Gunn", "Tiger in a Spotlight" and "The Enemy God" were recorded in Wheeling, West Virginia, USA, in November 1977.

"Peter Gunn" was nominated for Best Rock Instrumental Performance at the 23rd Annual Grammy Awards.

== Content ==
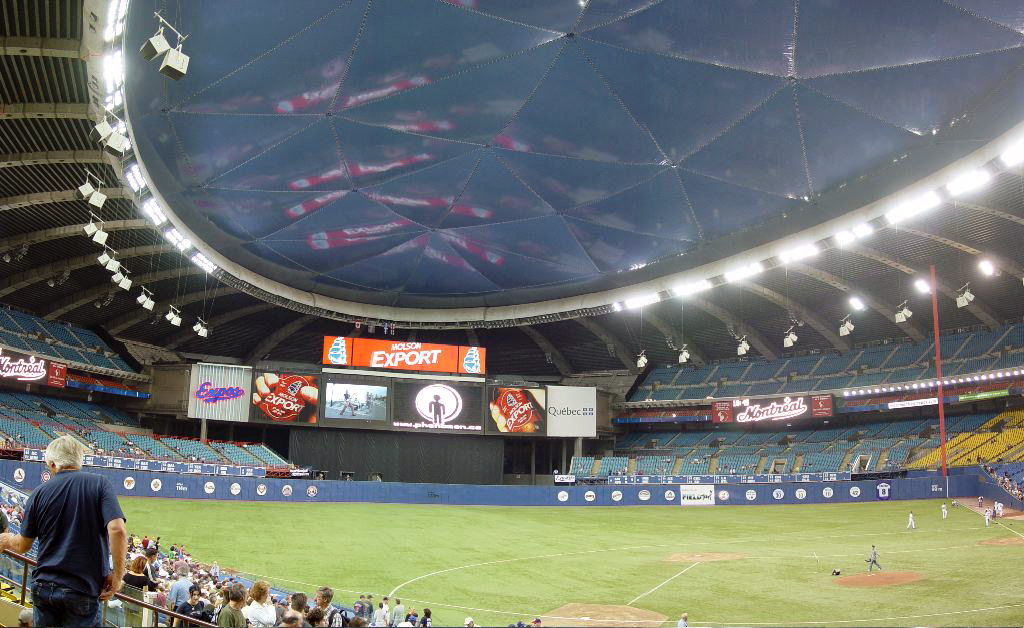
Interior view of the Olympic Stadium Montreal from a similar perspective as on the album cover image.

Similar to most live albums, In Concert showcased fan favourites of previously released material. However, "Peter Gunn", ELP's take on the classic TV theme song, was never released on any of their other albums (a slightly edited version of this live recording was included on the 1980 The Best of Emerson, Lake & Palmer compilation and released as a single in some countries). ELP frequently opened with this song on the Works Volume 2 tour.

The band hired a 70-piece orchestra for some concerts of this tour but eventually had to dismiss the orchestra due to budget constraints that almost bankrupted the group. On the original release, the orchestra performs on "C'est la Vie", "Knife-Edge", Keith Emerson's piano concerto, and "Pictures at an Exhibition". Works Live adds four other songs performed with the orchestra: "Fanfare for the Common Man", "Abaddon's Bolero", "Closer to Believing", and "Tank".

== Release ==
The original release of this album carried no producer credit; however, production and mixing of the album was largely carried out by Keith Emerson.

While Emerson intended to release In Concert as a double LP, the band's imminent dissolution meant ELP's label, Atlantic Records, limited it to a single album. The 1993 re-release of the album, as the double CD Works Live, restored Emerson's original intent to some extent.

The Montreal concert was also released on VHS in 1985 as Live '77, on DVD in 2002 as Works Orchestral Tour (paired with The Manticore Special) and as a double CD in 2013.

== Track listing ==
=== In Concert ===
Side one
No.	Title	Length
1.	"Introductory Fanfare" (Keith Emerson, Carl Palmer)	0:53
2.	"Peter Gunn" (Henry Mancini, arr. by Emerson, Greg Lake, Palmer)	3:37
3.	"Tiger in a Spotlight" (Emerson, Lake, Palmer, Peter Sinfield)	4:06
4.	"C'est la Vie" (Lake, Sinfield)	4:12
5.	"The Enemy God (Dances with the Black Spirits)" (Sergei Prokofiev, arr. by Emerson, Lake, Palmer)	2:49
6.	"Knife-Edge" (Emerson, Richard Fraser, Leoš Janáček, Lake)	5:14

Side two
No.	Title	Length
7.	"Piano Concerto No. 1, Third Movement: Toccata con fuoco" (Emerson)	6:35
8.	"Pictures at an Exhibition" (Emerson, Lake, Modest Mussorgsky, Palmer)	15:43

The re-released and expanded CD "Works Live"

=== Works Live ===
Disc One
No.	Title	Length
1.	"Introductory Fanfare"	0:52
2.	"Peter Gunn"	3:34
3.	"Tiger in a Spotlight"	4:08
4.	"C'est la Vie"	4:14
5.	"Watching Over You" (Lake, Sinfield)	3:59
6.	"Maple Leaf Rag" (Scott Joplin)	1:14
7.	"The Enemy God Dances with the Black Spirits"	2:46
8.	"Fanfare for the Common Man" (Aaron Copland)	10:54
9.	"Knife-Edge"	5:03
10.	"Show Me the Way to Go Home" (Jimmy Campbell, Reg Connelly)	4:20

Disc Two
No.	Title	Length
1.	"Abaddon's Bolero" (Emerson)	6:02
2.	"Pictures at an Exhibition"	15:40
3.	"Closer to Believing" (Lake, Sinfield)	5:28
4.	"Piano Concerto No. 1, Third Movement: Toccata con Fuoco"	6:40
5.	"Tank" (Emerson, Palmer)	12:36

=== Live '77 / Works Orchestral Tour (video) ===
No.	Title	Length
1.	"Abbadon's Bolero"
2.	"The Enemy God Dances with the Black Spirits"
3.	"Karn Evil 9, 1st Impression Part 2" (Emerson)
4.	"Pictures at an Exhibition"
5.	"C'est la Vie"
6.	"Lucky Man" (Lake)
7.	"Piano Concerto No. 1, 3rd Movement"
8.	"Tank"
9.	"Nutrocker" (Pyotr Ilyich Tchaikovsky, Kim Fowley)
10.	"Pirates" (Emerson, Lake, Sinfield)
11.	"Fanfare for the Common Man (including Rondo)"

=== Live in Montreal 1977 ===
Disc One
No.	Title	Length
1.	"Abbadon's Bolero"	6:03
2.	"Karn Evil 9, 1st Impression Part 2"	4:38
3.	"The Enemy God Dances with the Black Spirits"	2:58
4.	"C'est la Vie"	4:36
5.	"Lucky Man"	3:15
6.	"Pictures at an Exhibition"	15:43
7.	"Piano Concerto No. 1, 3rd Movement"	6:51
8.	"Closer to Believing" (Lake, Sinfield)	5:29

Disc Two
No.	Title	Length
1.	"Knife-Edge"	5:03
2.	"Tank"	13:22
3.	"Nutrocker"	3:59
4.	"Pirates"	13:38
5.	"Fanfare for the Common Man (including Rondo)"	17:30

== Personnel ==
=== Band members ===
- Keith Emerson – keyboards, mixing
- Greg Lake – vocals, bass, guitars
- Carl Palmer – drums, percussion
- A 70-piece orchestra on tracks 4, 6, 7 and 8 of In Concert, and tracks 4, 8, 9 of disc one and the entire disc two of Works Live.

=== Others ===
- Godfrey Salmon – conductor
- Michael Léveillée – sound engineer
- Neil Preston – inner sleeve photo
- François Rivard – cover photography
- Bob Defrin – art director

== Release details ==
- 1979, UK, Atlantic/WEA K50652, Release date 17 November 1979, LP
- 1979, Japan, Atlantic/Warner-Pioneer P-10697A, Release date 21 November 1979, LP
- 1996, UK, Essential/Castle ESDCD362, Release date ? ? 1996, CD (double release called "Works Live")
- 1999, Japan, Manticore/Victor KVICP-60644, Release date ? ? 1999, CD
- 2002, US, Manticore, double sided DVD ("Works Orchestral Tour / The Manticore Special")
- 2013, US, Shout! Factory 826663-14432, double CD ("Live in Montreal 1977")

== Singles ==
- Peter Gunn / Knife-Edge
- Peter Gunn / Tiger in a Spotlight (USA release)

== Charts ==
Chart performance for Emerson, Lake & Palmer in Concert
Chart (1979)	Peak position
Canada Top Albums/CDs (RPM)	80
Dutch Albums (Album Top 100)	3
US Billboard 200	73

Chart performance for Works Live
Chart (2026)	Peak position
French Rock & Metal Albums (SNEP)	84
Norwegian Physical Albums (IFPI Norge)	10
