= Honky Tonk Train Blues =

Single by Meade Lux Lewis
- B-side: "Whistlin' Blues"
- Released: 1929
- Recorded: 1927
- Genre: Boogie woogie
- Length: 3:10
- Label: Paramount
- Songwriter: Meade Lux Lewis

"Honky Tonk Train Blues" is a song written by Meade Lux Lewis, and first recorded in 1927. A proto boogie-woogie song, it has many of the traits that would come to be identified with rock and roll. It is also the first recorded use of the term "honky-tonk" in a song. In 2026 the track was inducted into the Blues Hall of Fame.

== History ==
The single, when first released, sold poorly, and Lux ended up working in a car wash for a living, but it was later heard by John Hammond, who found Lewis and hired him to record the song again, initially releasing it in Europe. In 1937 he re-recorded it again, releasing the song in the US, where it was a hit, subsequently touring the country in a series of concerts that helped popularize boogie-woogie.

== Legacy ==
It has gone on to be recorded in various contexts, often in a big band arrangement. Early recordings of the piece by artists other than Lewis include performances by Adrian Rollini, Frankie Trumbauer, classical harpsichordist Sylvia Marlowe, theater organist George Wright (with drummer Cozy Cole, under the title "Organ Boogie"), and Bob Zurke with Bob Crosby's orchestra.

- 1935 — Albert Ammons
- 1938 — Bob Crosby - Boogie-woogie instrumental featuring Bob Zurke at the piano
  - Benny Goodman
- 1939 — Jimmy Yancey
- 1963 — Rob Hoeke - Boogie-woogie quartet
- 1968 — Claude Bolling
- 1974 — Björn J:son Lindh
- 1976 — Keith Emerson
- 1997 — David Maxwell

Keith Emerson often included it in his repertoire, and his recording of it was a Top 30 hit in the UK Singles Chart.

Lewis's original version was inducted into the Blues Hall of Fame in 2026, in the 'Singles/album tracks' category.
