= I Believe in Father Christmas =

1975 single by Greg Lake

Single by Greg Lake
- B-side: "Humbug"
- Released: November 1975 (with orchestra)
- Recorded: 1974
- Studio: Abbey Road Studios, London
- Genre: Christmas; classical; symphonic rock; folk rock
- Length: 3:31
- Label: Manticore
- Composers: G. Lake; S. Prokofiev
- Lyricist: Peter Sinfield
- Producers: G. Lake; P. Sinfield

Greg Lake singles chronology
"I Believe in Father Christmas" (1975)	"C'est La Vie" (1977)

Official video
- "I Believe in Father Christmas" on YouTube

"I Believe in Father Christmas"

Song by Emerson, Lake & Palmer

from the album Works Volume 2
- Released: November 1977 (without orchestra)
- Genre: Christmas; classical; folk rock
- Length: 3:17
- Label: Atlantic
- Composers: G. Lake; S. Prokofiev
- Lyricist: Peter Sinfield
- Producers: G. Lake; P. Sinfield

Works Volume 2 track listing
- 12 tracks A-side: 1. "Tiger in a Spotlight"; 2. "When the Apple Blossoms Bloom in the Windmills of Your Mind, I'll Be Your Valentine"; 3. "Bullfrog"; 4. "Brain Salad Surgery"; 5. "Barrelhouse Shake-Down"; 6. "Watching Over You"; B-side: 1. "So Far to Fall; 2. "Maple Leaf Rag (Odeon Rag)"; 3. "I Believe in Father Christmas"; 4. "Close But Not Touching"; 5. "Honky-Tonk Train Blues"; 6. "Show Me the Way to Go Home"

Official audio
- "I Believe in Father Christmas" on YouTube

"I Believe in Father Christmas" is a song by English musician Greg Lake with lyrics by Peter Sinfield. Although it is often categorised as an antireligious song, this was not Lake's intention. He said that he wrote the song in protest at the commercialisation of Christmas. Sinfield, however, said that the words are about a loss of innocence and childhood belief. Released as Lake's debut solo single in 1975, the song reached number 2 on the UK Singles Chart, number 17 on the Irish Singles Chart and number 98 in Australia.

== Background ==
Lake wrote the song at his west London home, after tuning the bottom string of his guitar from E down to D.

The instrumental riff between verses comes from the "Troika" portion of Sergei Prokofiev's Lieutenant Kijé Suite, written for the 1934 Soviet film Lieutenant Kijé; this was added at the suggestion of Keith Emerson (an adaptation of the same song was used on Emerson's later The Christmas Album (1988)). Peter Sinfield described the song as "a picture-postcard Christmas, with morbid edges."

== Release ==
The song was recorded by Lake in 1974 and released separately from ELP in 1975, reaching number two on the UK Singles Chart. It was kept from number one by Queen's "Bohemian Rhapsody".

Lake commented: "I got beaten by one of the greatest records ever made. I would've been pissed off if I'd been beaten by Cliff [Richard]." However, orchestrator Godfrey Salmon said: "I was surprised the single wasn't more successful. I thought 'Bohemian Rhapsody' was rubbish, and still do. When it got to No 1 before we'd even brought ours out, I thought it would be long gone by Christmas. How wrong can you get?"

The record continued to sell, and in 1984 and 1986 reached 84 and 98, respectively, on the UK Singles Chart. The song also reached #98 in Australia in late 1975.

== Video ==
The video for the record was shot on the Sinai Peninsula of Egypt, Israel in those days, and in the Dead Sea Scrolls caves in Israel, and includes footage from the Vietnam War and Six-Day War.

== Legacy ==
A second recording by the full ELP trio, but with a sparser arrangement, was included on the 1977 album Works Volume 2. It was recorded a third time in 1993, for the ELP box set The Return of the Manticore, and Lake revisited it yet again for the 2002 Sanctuary Records compilation A Classic Rock Christmas. The song has also appeared on several other ELP and Christmas compilation albums including a 1995 EP titled I Believe in Father Christmas, which includes Lake's original single as well as the Works Volume II version.

In 2005, Lake wrote a letter to The Guardian about the song, in answer to a reader question regarding whether it was possible to survive on Christmas royalties alone:

In 1975, I wrote and recorded a song called "I Believe in Father Christmas", which some Guardian readers may remember and may even own. It was a big hit and it still gets played on the radio every year around December, and it appears on more or less every Christmas compilation going. So I can tell you from experience that it's lovely to get the old royalty cheque around September every year, but on its own, the Christmas song money isn’t quite enough to buy my own island in the Caribbean. I'm on tour at the moment and the Christmas song is as well received now as it was 30 years ago – maybe even more so. If Guardian readers could all please request it be played by their local radio stations, maybe that Caribbean island wouldn’t be so far away – and if I get there, you’re all invited.

== Charts ==
Chart (1975)	Peak position
Australian Singles (Kent Music Report)	98
Ireland (IRMA)	17
UK Singles (Official Charts)	2
US Billboard Hot 100	95

== Certifications ==
Region	Certification	Certified units/sales
United Kingdom (BPI) 2008 release	Gold	400,000^{‡}
^{‡} Sales+streaming figures based on certification alone.
