= Works Volume 2 =

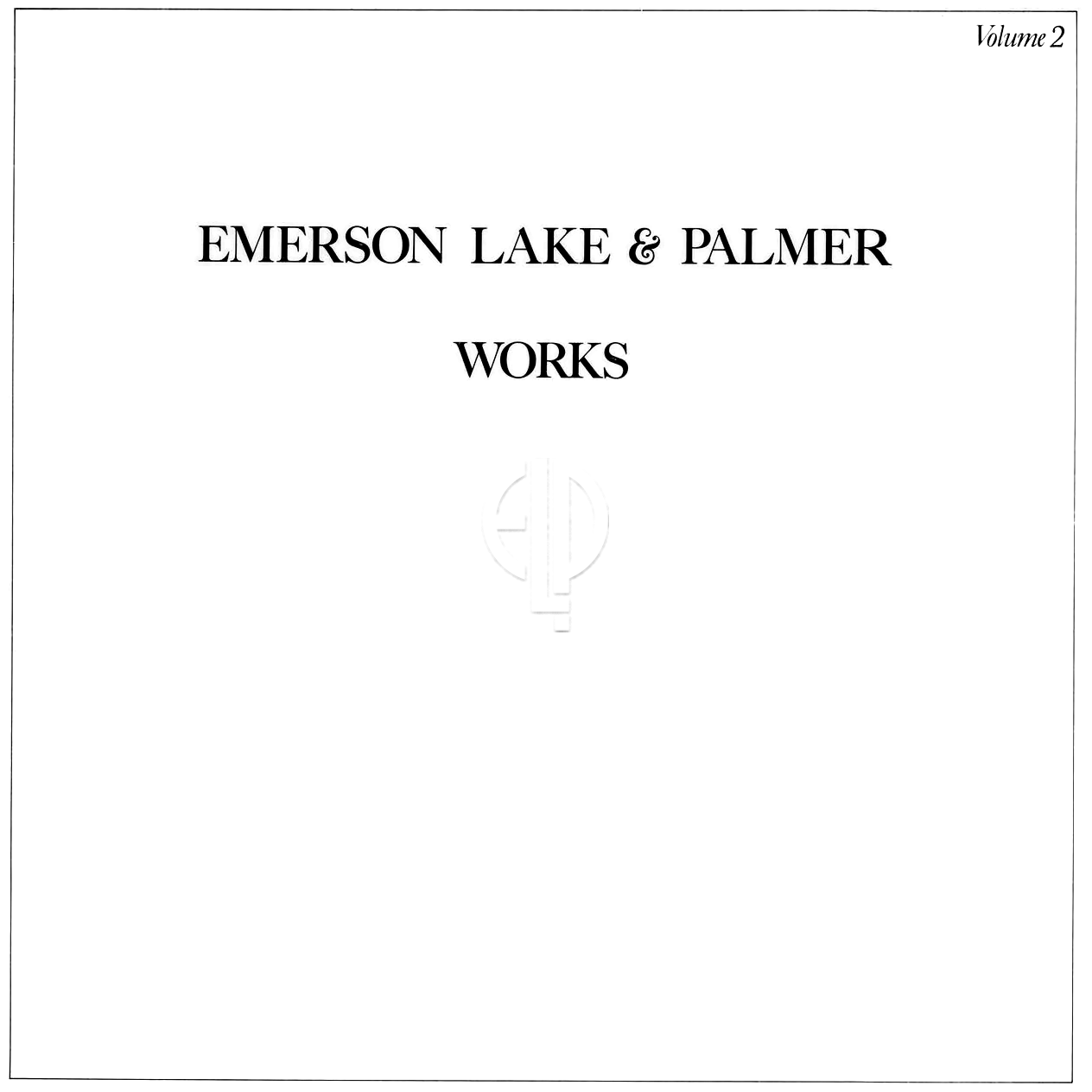

Studio album by Emerson, Lake & Palmer
- Released: 25 November 1977
- Recorded: 1973–1976
- Genres: Progressive rock; jazz fusion; blues rock
- Length: 43:13
- Label: Atlantic
- Producers: Keith Emerson; Greg Lake; Carl Palmer; Peter Sinfield

Emerson, Lake & Palmer chronology
Works Volume 1 (1977)	Works Volume 2 (1977)	Love Beach (1978)

Singles from Works Volume 2
- 1. "Tiger in a Spotlight" Released: 28 December 1977 (Ger.); 2. "Watching Over You" Released: 20 January 1978 (UK)

Works Volume 2 is the sixth studio album by Emerson, Lake & Palmer, released on 25 November 1977. Unlike Works Volume 1 (which consisted of three solo sides and one ensemble side), Works Volume 2 was a single album compilation of leftover tracks from other album sessions, similar to the Who's Odds & Sods or Led Zeppelin's Coda. While many derided the album for its apparent lack of focus, others praised it for showing a different side of the band than usual, with blues, bluegrass and jazz being very prominent as musical genres in this recording.

The remastered 2017 version of the album is expanded to a double-CD by the inclusion of the complete Works Live, an extended version of Emerson, Lake & Palmer in Concert.

== Songs ==
"When the Apple Blossoms Bloom...", "Tiger in a Spotlight" and "Brain Salad Surgery" had been recorded at the 1973 sessions for the album Brain Salad Surgery but did not appear on it. The funk-fusion tinged "Apple Blossoms" first appeared as the B-side to "Jerusalem", "Brain Salad Surgery" had first surfaced as part of a 1973 BSS promotional flexi-disc before becoming the flip side to "Fanfare for the Common Man", and "Tiger in a Spotlight" was briefly considered as a 1974 single but held over until this album. All three are heavily synth dominated while two also feature electric guitars, much in the style of the rest of Brain Salad Surgery.

Two solo singles released during the group's sabbatical were also included. An orchestral version of Greg Lake's "I Believe in Father Christmas" had been released at the close of 1975 and hit #2 in the UK, becoming an annual Christmas standard there. The version on this album replaced the orchestra with new synth parts from Emerson. Meanwhile, Keith Emerson's cover of "Honky Tonk Train Blues" had been released as a single in April 1976, reaching #21 on the UK singles chart. Its B-side, "Barrelhouse Shakdown", was also included.

The rest of the songs were outtakes from the 1976 sessions that produced Works Volume 1. "Maple Leaf Rag" was a faithful ragtime cover from Emerson, "Watching Over You" and "So Far To Fall" were guitar-based outtakes from Lake's solo side, while "Bullfrog" and "Close But Not Touching" were jazz-fusion instrumentals originating from Palmer's sessions. There is also a group cover of "Show Me the Way to Go Home" which closes the album.

== Reception ==
Professional ratings
Review scores
Source	Rating
AllMusic	4/5 stars
Classic Rock	3/5 stars
Louder	3.5/5 stars
MusicHound Rock	2/5 stars
Rolling Stone	(unfavorable)
The Village Voice	C+

The album was not as commercially successful as the band's previous albums; it reached No. 20 in the UK and No. 37 in the US. Three tracks from the album were released as singles: "Tiger in a Spotlight", "Maple Leaf Rag", and "Watching Over You".

In a contemporary review, Robert Christgau of The Village Voice facetiously remarked that it is "news" when "the world's most overweening 'progressive' group" makes an album "less pretentious than its title", but questioned whether it is "rock and roll". In a retrospective review, AllMusic's David Ross Smith felt that it was "highly underrated" and wrote that the album's "brief pieces sustain interest; there really isn't a weak tune in the set." Paul Stump, in his 1997 History of Progressive Rock, commented that "Even Progressive militants have trouble defending Vol. 2, although 'When the Apple Blossoms Bloom in the Windmills of Your Mind' does have a perverse charm. 'Tiger in a Spotlight', however, a cheesy plod, shows just how low the band's collective inspiration had sunk."

The two Works albums were supported by North American tours which lasted from May 1977 to February 1978, spanning over 120 dates. Some early concerts in 1977 were performed with a hand-picked orchestra and choir, but the idea was shelved after 18 shows with the band due to budget constraints. The final concert with the orchestra and choir took place on 26 August 1977 at the Olympic Stadium in Montreal that was attended by an estimated 78,000 people, the highest attended Emerson, Lake & Palmer concert as a solo act. According to Lake on the Beyond the Beginning DVD documentary, the band lost around $3 million on the tour. Lake and Palmer blame Emerson for the loss as the use of an orchestra on tour was his idea.

== Track listing ==
Side one
No.	Title	Writer(s)	Length
1.	"Tiger in a Spotlight" (Recorded 1973)	Keith Emerson, Greg Lake, Carl Palmer, Peter Sinfield	4:34
2.	"When the Apple Blossoms Bloom in the Windmills of Your Mind I'll Be Your Valentine" (B-side of "Jerusalem", 1973)	Emerson, Lake, Palmer	3:55
3.	"Bullfrog"	Ron Aspery, Colin Hodgkinson, Palmer	3:52
4.	"Brain Salad Surgery" (B-side of "Fanfare for the Common Man"; recorded 1973)	Emerson, Lake, Sinfield	3:05
5.	"Barrelhouse Shake-Down" (B-side of "Honky Tonk Train Blues")	Emerson	3:47
6.	"Watching Over You"	Lake, Sinfield	3:55

Side two
No.	Title	Writer(s)	Length
1.	"So Far to Fall"	Emerson, Lake, Sinfield	4:56
2.	"Maple Leaf Rag"	Scott Joplin, arr. Emerson	1:55
3.	"I Believe in Father Christmas" (1975 solo single by Greg Lake, new arrangement)	Lake, Sinfield, Sergei Prokofiev	3:16
4.	"Close but Not Touching"	Palmer	3:19
5.	"Honky Tonk Train Blues" (1976 solo single by Keith Emerson)	Meade Lux Lewis	3:09
6.	"Show Me the Way to Go Home"	Jimmy Campbell and Reg Connelly	3:40
Total length:			43:13

2001 bonus tracks
No.	Title	Writer(s)	Length
7.	"Tiger in a Spotlight" (Live at New Haven Veterans Memorial Coliseum, New Haven, Connecticut, USA, 30 November 1977)	Emerson, Lake, Palmer, Sinfield	4:14
8.	"Watching Over You" (Live at New Haven Veterans Memorial Coliseum, New Haven, Connecticut, USA, 30 November 1977)	Lake, Sinfield	4:30
9.	"Show Me the Way to Go Home" (Live at Hulman Civic Center, Indiana State University, Terre Haute, Indiana, USA, 24 January 1978)	Campbell, Connelly	5:34
Total length:			57:21

== Personnel ==
=== Emerson, Lake & Palmer ===
- Keith Emerson - keyboards, piano, Hammond organ, synthesizers, accordion, production
- Greg Lake - vocals, guitars, bass guitar, production
- Carl Palmer - drums, percussion, production

=== Additional personnel ===
- Peter Sinfield - lyrics, production
- London Philharmonic Orchestra - on "Maple Leaf Rag"
- Ron Aspery - saxophone on "Bullfrog" (uncredited in the original release)
- Colin Hodgkinson - bass on "Bullfrog" (uncredited in the original release)
- Graham Smith - harmonica on "Watching Over You"

== Charts ==
=== Weekly charts ===
Chart (1977)	Peak position
Australian Albums (Kent Music Report)	37
Canada Top Albums/CDs (RPM)	34
German Albums (Offizielle Top 100)	50
Japanese Albums (Oricon)	38
UK Albums (Official Charts)	20
US Billboard 200	37

=== Year-end charts ===
Chart (1977)	Peak position
Australian Albums (Kent Music Report)	20

== Certifications ==
Region	Certification	Certified units/sales
United States (RIAA)	Gold	500,000^{^}
^{^} Shipments figures based on certification alone.

== Sources ==
- Macan, Edward (2006). Endless Enigma: A Musical Biography of Emerson, Lake & Palmer. Open Court Publishing Company. ISBN 0-8126-9596-8.
