= Peter Gunn (song) =

Original composition by Henry Mancini; theme music for the Peter Gunn TV series

Single by Henry Mancini

from the album The Music from Peter Gunn
- B-side: "The Brothers Go to Mother's"
- Released: Jan 1959
- Recorded: 1958
- Studio: Radio Recorders, Los Angeles
- Genre: Instrumental, theme music, crime jazz
- Length: 2:04
- Label: RCA Victor
- Composer: Henry Mancini
- Producer: Simon Rady

Official audio
- "Peter Gunn" (1993 Remastered) on YouTube

"Peter Gunn" is the theme music composed by Henry Mancini for the television show of the same name. The song was the opening track on the original soundtrack album, The Music from Peter Gunn, released by RCA Victor in 1959. For his work writing the theme and score to "Peter Gunn", Mancini was nominated for an Emmy Award (Best Musical Contribution to a Television Program) and won two Grammys (Album of the Year & Best Arrangement). In 2005, the song was inducted into the Grammy Hall of Fame.

== Recording and releases ==
In his 1989 autobiography, Did They Mention the Music?, Mancini states:

The Peter Gunn title theme actually derives more from rock and roll than from jazz. I used guitar and piano in unison, playing what is known in music as an ostinato, which means obstinate. It was sustained throughout the piece, giving it a sinister effect, with some frightened saxophone sounds and some shouting brass. The piece has one chord throughout and a super-simple top line.

In the original recording of the song, the piano riff is played by John Williams, who went on to become an influential film composer. Mancini arranged the first single version of the song for trumpeter Ray Anthony in 1959. Recorded for Capitol Records at Radio Recorders and featuring tenor saxophonist Plas Johnson, it reached number eight on the Billboard Hot 100, number 12 on the R&B chart, and number 13 in Canada.

Mancini has recorded several different versions of his theme music including "Señor Peter Gunn" on his 1965 album, The Latin Sound of Henry Mancini, and in a new arrangement for the 1967 movie Gunn...Number One!.

Lyrics were added by Jay Livingston and Ray Evans and first recorded in 1965 by Sarah Vaughan in an arrangement by Bill Holman on her album Sarah Vaughan Sings the Mancini Songbook. Mancini also recorded a vocal version titled "Bye Bye" that is on his 1967 soundtrack album Gunn...Number One!.

== Other charting versions ==
In addition to the many different arrangements of the "Peter Gunn" theme recorded by Mancini, the music has also been recorded by numerous other artists. Versions that reached the record charts include:

- An instrumental version by guitarist Duane Eddy featuring Steve Douglas on saxophone reached number six on the UK Singles Chart on June 25, 1959, number 27 on the Billboard Hot 100 on November 14, 1960, and number 30 in Canada November 28, 1960.
- Deodato released a version of the song in 1976, which reached number 20 on the US dance chart, number 84 on the Billboard Hot 100, and number 96 on the R&B chart.
- Art of Noise released a version of the song featuring Eddy in 1986, which reached number two on the US dance chart, number eight in the UK, number 14 in Canada, and number 50 on the Billboard Hot 100. It was featured on their 1986 album In Visible Silence, and was awarded a Grammy for Best Rock Instrumental Performance. In Canada, the song spent 20 weeks in the top 100, and was number 84 in the year-end chart.
- The B-52's adapted Mancini's ostinato or riff and added lyrics for their song "Planet Claire". It is used as the opening track on the group's 1979 self-titled debut album. In AllMusic review, Stewart Mason describes the instrumental opening to the song as "space sounds blend[ing] into a jumpy, speeded-up version of Henry Mancini's 'Peter Gunn' theme mixed with sounds that could have been lifted from one of Joe Meek's 'Telstar' follow-ups, followed by a lengthy wordless vocal and organ section that recalls the theme from Star Trek." Released on an EP, it reached number 24 on Billboard's Disco Hot 100 chart.
- Pittsburgh-based rock band The Silencers included a pounding guitar-driven cover of the song on their 1980 LP "Rock and Roll Enforcers." It was the opening song of their medley video that premiered on the day that MTV began operation: August 1, 1981. It was the 40th song ever shown on the network (see list of all videos). The video was played in regular rotation on MTV and was voted the #3 most popular video of 1981.
- Progressive rock band Emerson, Lake & Palmer released a version of the song as a single from their 1979 live album Emerson, Lake & Palmer in Concert. It was nominated for best rock instrumental at the 23rd Annual Grammy Awards.

== Notable media appearances ==
"Peter Gunn" appeared as background music in various scenes of the film The Blues Brothers and on its soundtrack album, as recorded by The Blues Brothers Band.

An electronic arrangement of "Peter Gunn" plays throughout the video game Spy Hunter and Spy Hunter II.

The theme was used in Stitch! The Movie and The Lion King 1½, as well as Waterworld.

The song was featured in the video game Rock n' Roll Racing.

The B-52s sampled "Peter Gunn" for their song "Planet Claire".

The Sopranos episode "Mr. Ruggerio's Neighborhood" features "Peter Gunn" repeatedly, including as a mashup with "Every Breath You Take" by The Police.

"Peter Gunn" served as the opening theme music for the East German TV drama, Blaulicht.
