= Works Volume 1 =

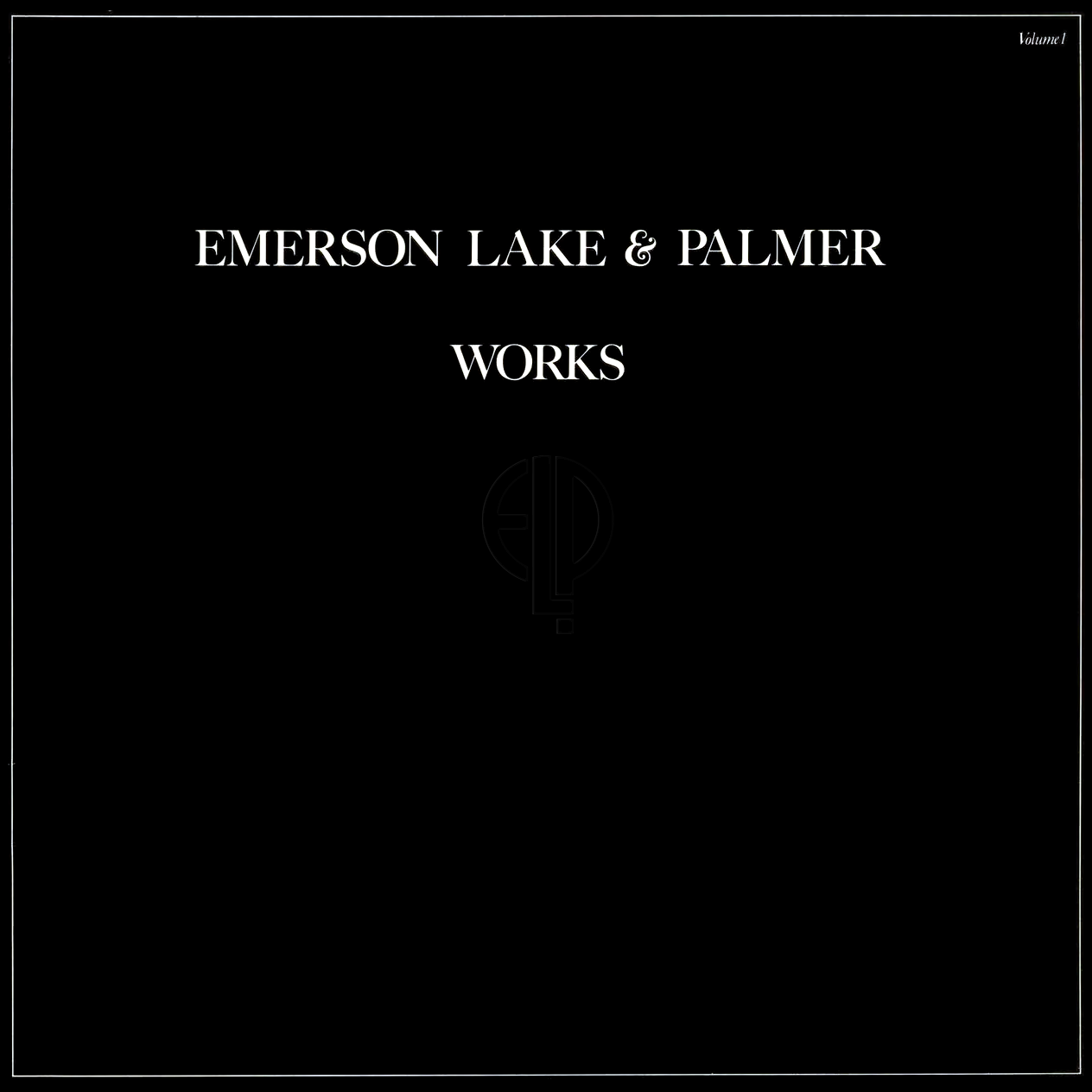

Studio album by Emerson, Lake & Palmer
- Released: 25 March 1977
- Recorded: 1976
- Studios: De Lane Lea Studios, London; Mountain Studios, Montreux; Pathé-Marconi EMI Studios, Paris
- Genres: Contemporary classical music; folk rock; progressive rock; art rock
- Length: 87:23
- Label: Atlantic
- Producers: Keith Emerson; Greg Lake; Carl Palmer; Peter Sinfield

Emerson, Lake & Palmer chronology
| Welcome Back My Friends to the Show That Never Ends – Ladies and Gentlemen (1974) | Works Volume 1 (1977) | Works Volume 2 (1977) |

Singles from Works Volume 1
- 1. "Fanfare for the Common Man" Released: 27 May 1977; 2. "C'est La Vie" Released: 26 August 1977

Works Volume 1 is the fifth studio album by the English progressive rock band Emerson, Lake & Palmer, released as a double album on 25 March 1977 on Atlantic Records. Following their world tour supporting Brain Salad Surgery (1973), the group took an extended break before they reconvened in 1976 to record a new album. They were now tax exiles and recorded new material in London and overseas in Montreux, Switzerland and Paris, France. Works Volume 1 features a side dedicated for each member to write and arrange their own tracks, while the fourth side features songs performed collectively. Keith Emerson recorded his Piano Concerto No. 1, Greg Lake wrote several songs with lyricist Peter Sinfield, and Carl Palmer recorded tracks of varied musical styles.

The album peaked at No. 9 on the UK Albums Chart and No. 12 on the US Billboard 200 and went gold in both countries, the latter for 500,000 copies sold. The group track "Fanfare for the Common Man", Emerson's adaptation of the 1942 composition by Aaron Copland, was released as a single in May 1977. It went to No. 2 on the UK singles chart to become the band's highest-charting single in the UK. Additional material recorded in 1976, plus songs from previous studio sessions, were released as Works Volume 2. Both albums were supported with the 1977–1978 tour, which featured the band playing with an orchestra on stage for some early shows.

== Background ==
In August 1974, Emerson, Lake & Palmer finished their ten-month world tour in support of their fourth album, Brain Salad Surgery (1973). This was followed by the triple live album Welcome Back, My Friends, to the Show That Never Ends ～ Ladies and Gentlemen (1974) which earned the group their highest charting position in the US with a peak of No. 4, and No. 6 in the UK. The trio took an extended break, having been on the recording and touring circuit each year since their formation in 1970. Keith Emerson said that at this point in their career, the group's musical direction had been "milked dry" and they wanted to spend time planning their next step.

In 1976, the three had decided to start on a new studio album and became tax exiles, meaning they had to record overseas. Lake recalled that this was an unpopular opinion as the members had family based in England. They settled in Montreux, Switzerland where they recorded at Mountain Studios. Lake recalled his time there was difficult for creativity: "It's so grey. There's nothing there. You get sod-all inspiration!" Emerson supported his view and called it "the end of the earth", but he and Palmer praised the studio facilities and the quality of the equipment.

Lyricist Pete Sinfield has claimed credit for the album's title, explaining, "I suppose if you're gonna be pretentious, you might as well do it big. They had all these bits floating around. But 'Bits' didn't really sound right."

For Works, Lake wanted to take a more serious approach in writing and singing ballads, and felt singing with an orchestra added greater variety to his songs. Both tracks on side four feature Emerson playing a Yamaha GX-1 synthesizer.

In March 1977, Lake said that the band had completed additional material that would be released on Works Volume 2.

== Music ==
=== Sides one to three ===
Side one features Emerson's Piano Concerto No. 1, a three-movement work for piano and orchestra. Emerson performs on a Steinway grand piano with the London Philharmonic Orchestra conducted by John Mayer, who assisted on the orchestral arrangements. He wanted to write a serious piece that would not date itself, with the aim of having it performed by others in the future. Working hard on the score, Emerson looked back on it shortly after the album was released: "I've squeezed every ounce of myself into that thing. And I feel very satisfied." An initial recording session took place at Kingsway Hall in London with mobile studio equipment, but the orchestra had difficulty understanding the score and performers complained of the hall's acoustics, resulting in Emerson "wasting a lot of money." A successful session arose when recording relocated to De Lane Lea Studios. When it came to preparing material for the album, Emerson dedicated a period to "think and write" following his depression after his Sussex home caught fire two years prior, burning his possessions and music he had put down. The work's third movement reflected Emerson's mood at the time of the fire, and he was able to get "a lot of anger" out through the music. In the band's Beyond the Beginning documentary, Lake recalled that Emerson invited composer Leonard Bernstein to listen to the work during his visit to the Paris studio where the recording was being mixed. Upon listening to the work, Bernstein said it "reminded him of Grandma Moses", a folk artist. Emerson, however, did not recall Bernstein saying this.

Side two is the Greg Lake side, and consists of acoustic ballads, all of which were written by Lake and Peter Sinfield.

Side three, the Carl Palmer side, includes a remake of "Tank" from the band's self-titled debut album released in 1970, with orchestral accompaniment and minus the drum solo. "L.A. Nights" features Eagles guitarist Joe Walsh on lead and slide guitar and scat vocals. Two arrangements of classical pieces are included: Two-Part Invention in D minor, BWV 775 by Johann Sebastian Bach and a piece titled "The Enemy God Dances With the Black Spirits", an excerpt of the 2nd movement of the Scythian Suite by Sergei Prokofiev.

=== Side four ===
The fourth side features two group-performed pieces. "Fanfare for the Common Man" is an adaptation of the same-titled piece by American composer Aaron Copland. Emerson sought Copland's permission so the group could use it; Copland found their version appealing but was puzzled at the solo section in the middle of two fairly straightforward renditions of his piece.

The 13-minute "Pirates" originated from a piece Emerson had written for a cancelled film version of Frederick Forsyth's book The Dogs of War. When Lake and Sinfield got together to write lyrics for the track, Emerson had told Lake that he wrote it with mercenaries in mind, which Lake found distasteful and wanted the song to be about something else. He conjured images of the sea upon listening to Emerson's piece, which made him think of pirates. Sinfield liked the idea, and the pair wrote words at Lake's mountain chalet. "Pirates" was recorded in two separate studios; Lake had a falling out with the orchestra used in Montreux, so recording moved to Paris with the National Opera of Paris orchestra and conductor Godfrey Salmon. Sinfeld recalled the band wanting Leonard Bernstein to conduct the orchestral arrangements on "Pirates", and arranged for Bernstein, who was conducting at the nearby Opera House, to visit the studio and hear the piece. Lake said: "I pressed the play button, and he put his head in his hands and from beginning to end, he didn't move [...] If he didn't like something, you would be told [...] he looked at me, and he said, 'The singing's not bad.' [...] I'm sure he didn't realize that I was the singer". Sinfield remembered Bernstein describing it as "primitive".

== Reception ==
Professional ratings
Review scores
| Source | Rating |
|---|---|
| AllMusic | 3.5/5 stars |
| Classic Rock | 2/5 stars |
| MusicHound Rock | 2/5 stars |
| Rolling Stone | (favorable) |
| Louder | 3.5/5 stars |

The album was originally released just as the punk era was getting underway, when bands like ELP were perceived as bloated "dinosaurs". As a result, Works Volume 1 received mixed-to-poor reviews and is often viewed as marking the start of an artistic downturn in the group's career, despite the great success of "Fanfare for the Common Man" as a single. In a contemporary review, Rolling Stone did not care for either the Emerson or Lake sides but liked Palmer's selections, and reserved high praise for the two group numbers on side four.

AllMusic's retrospective review is mixed. They also criticize the solo sides of Keith Emerson ("on the level of a good music-student piece, without much original language") and Greg Lake ("'C'est la Vie', the featured single, says little that 'Still...You Turn Me On', from their previous album, didn't say better and shorter"). They offer some praise for the Carl Palmer and group sides, but conclude that the group songs "cover a lot of old ground, albeit in ornate and stylish fashion." Paul Stump's 1997 History of Progressive Rock characterized the album as excessive, indulgent, and "clodhoppingly stereotypical", but also asserted that it "is not without merit". In particular, he argued that while doing a piano concerto is a pompous and indulgent idea, Emerson pulls it off reasonably well, and his impressive virtuosity fits more comfortably in this context than in Emerson, Lake & Palmer's rock workouts.

== Track listing ==
Side one: Keith Emerson
| No. | Title | Writer(s) | Length |
|---|---|---|---|
| 1. | "Piano Concerto No. 1": "First Movement: Allegro giojoso"; "Second Movement: Andante molto cantabile"; "Third Movement: Toccata con fuoco" | Keith Emerson | 18:18 |
| Total length: | | | 18:18 |

Side two: Greg Lake
| No. | Title | Writer(s) | Length |
|---|---|---|---|
| 1. | "Lend Your Love to Me Tonight" | Greg Lake, Peter Sinfield | 4:01 |
| 2. | "C'est la Vie" | Lake, Sinfield | 4:16 |
| 3. | "Hallowed Be Thy Name" | Lake, Sinfield | 4:35 |
| 4. | "Nobody Loves You Like I Do" | Lake, Sinfield | 3:56 |
| 5. | "Closer to Believing" | Lake, Sinfield | 5:33 |
| Total length: | | | 22:21 |

Side three: Carl Palmer
| No. | Title | Writer(s) | Length |
|---|---|---|---|
| 1. | "The Enemy God Dances with the Black Spirits" | Sergei Prokofiev, arr. Emerson, Lake, Carl Palmer | 3:20 |
| 2. | "L.A. Nights" | Palmer | 5:42 |
| 3. | "New Orleans" | Palmer | 2:45 |
| 4. | "Two Part Invention in D Minor" | J. S. Bach, arr. Palmer | 1:54 |
| 5. | "Food for Your Soul" | Palmer, Harry South | 3:57 |
| 6. | "Tank" | Emerson, Palmer | 5:08 |
| Total length: | | | 22:46 |

Side four: Emerson, Lake & Palmer
| No. | Title | Writer(s) | Length |
|---|---|---|---|
| 1. | "Fanfare for the Common Man" | Aaron Copland, arr. Emerson | 9:40 |
| 2. | "Pirates" | Emerson, Lake, Sinfield | 13:18 |
| Total length: | | | 22:58 |

2004 reissue bonus tracks
| No. | Title | Writer(s) | Length |
|---|---|---|---|
| 1. | "Tank (Live in Indiana, 24 January 1978)" | | 9:49 |
| 2. | "The Enemy God Dances with the Black Spirits (Live in Indiana, 24 January 1978)" | | 3:13 |
| 3. | "Nut Rocker (Live in Indiana, 24 January 1978)" | Pyotr Ilyich Tchaikovsky, Kim Fowley | 4:18 |

== Personnel ==
Credits are taken from the album's liner notes.

Emerson, Lake & Palmer

- Keith Emerson – Steinway grand piano (on side 1), keyboards (on "L. A. Nights" and side 4), Yamaha GX-1 (on "Fanfare for the Common Man"), production on side 1
- Greg Lake – vocals (on side 2 and "Pirates"), bass, acoustic and electric guitars (on sides 2 and 4), production (on sides 2 and 4)
- Carl Palmer – drums, xylophone, timpani (on sides 3 and 4), production (on side 3)

Additional personnel

- London Philharmonic Orchestra on "Piano Concerto No. 1"
- John Mayer – conductor on "Piano Concerto No. 1"
- Joe Walsh – guitars and scat vocals on "L.A. Nights"
- Peter Sinfield – lyrics on side 2 and "Pirates", production on side 2
- Tony Harris – orchestral arrangement on side 2
- Godfrey Salmon – orchestra and choir conductor on side 2 and "Pirates"
- Orchestre de l'Opéra national de Paris on "Pirates"

Technical personnel

- Ashley Newton – art direction
- Ian Murray – design, artwork
- John Timperley and Roger Cameron – engineering
- David Montgomery – Emerson photography
- Kenny Smith – Lake photography
- Alex Grob – Palmer photography

== Charts ==
=== Weekly charts ===
| Chart (1977) | Peak position |
|---|---|
| Australian Albums (Kent Music Report) | 6 |
| Austrian Albums (Ö3 Austria) | 11 |
| Canada Top Albums/CDs (RPM) | 17 |
| Dutch Albums (Album Top 100) | 17 |
| German Albums (Offizielle Top 100) | 10 |
| Italian Albums (Musica e Dischi) | 5 |
| Japanese Albums (Oricon) | 13 |
| Norwegian Albums (VG-lista) | 11 |
| UK Albums (Official Charts) | 9 |
| US Billboard 200 | 12 |

| Chart (2017) | Peak position |
|---|---|
| UK Rock & Metal Albums (Official Charts) | 37 |

=== Year-end charts ===
| Chart (1977) | Position |
|---|---|
| Australian Albums (Kent Music Report) | 16 |

== Certifications ==
| Region | Certification | Certified units/sales |
|---|---|---|
| Canada (Music Canada) | Gold | 50,000^{^} |
| United Kingdom (BPI) | Gold | 100,000^{^} |
| United States (RIAA) | Gold | 500,000^{^} |
^{^} Shipments figures based on certification alone.

== Sampling ==
- The same verse and chorus melody as in the song "C'est la Vie" is used for the Zdravko Čolić's 1984 song "Ruška" and the Divlji Kesten's 1995 song "Svrati ponekad".
