= The Best of Emerson, Lake & Palmer =

Greatest hits album by Emerson, Lake & Palmer
- Released: 14 November 1980
- Genre: Progressive rock Symphonic rock
- Length: 38:51
- Label: Atlantic
- Producer: Greg Lake

Emerson, Lake & Palmer chronology
Emerson, Lake & Palmer in Concert (1979)	The Best of Emerson, Lake & Palmer (1980)	Black Moon (1992)

Alternative cover
- 1994 cover

Professional ratings
Review scores
Source	Rating
MusicHound Rock	(1980 & 1995)

The Best of Emerson, Lake & Palmer is an album by British progressive rock band Emerson, Lake & Palmer, released in 1980. Another compilation with the same title was released in 1994.

== Original 1980 track listing ==
The original album had only 9 tracks.

No.	Title	Writer(s)	From album	Length
1.	"Hoedown"	Copland	Trilogy, 1972	3:46
2.	"Lucky Man"	Lake	Emerson, Lake & Palmer, 1970	4:38
3.	"Karn Evil 9: 1st Impression, Part 2"	Emerson	Brain Salad Surgery, 1973	4:48
4.	"Jerusalem"	Blake, Parry	Brain Salad Surgery	2:45
5.	"Peter Gunn"	Henry Mancini	Emerson, Lake & Palmer in Concert, 1979	3:37
6.	"Fanfare for the Common Man"	Copland	Single version; originally from Works Volume 1, 1977	2:57
7.	"Still...You Turn Me On"	Lake	Brain Salad Surgery	2:54
8.	"Tiger in a Spotlight"	Emerson, Lake, Palmer, Sinfield	Works Volume 2, 1977	4:35
9.	"Trilogy"	Emerson, Lake	Trilogy	8:51
Total length:				38:51

== 1994 track listing ==
1. "From the Beginning" (Greg Lake) (4:13)
2. "Jerusalem" (William Blake, Hubert Parry, arr. by Keith Emerson, Lake, Carl Palmer) (2:44)
3. "Still...You Turn Me On" (Lake) (2:53)
4. "Fanfare for the Common Man" (Aaron Copland) (Single version) (2:57)
5. "Knife-Edge" (Leoš Janáček, J. S. Bach, arr. by Emerson) (5:05)
6. "Tarkus" (Emerson, Lake) (20:35)
  1. "Eruption" (2:43)
  2. "Stones of Years" (3:44)
  3. "Iconoclast" (1:15)
  4. "Mass" (3:11)
  5. "Manticore" (1:52)
  6. "Battlefield" (3:51)
  7. "Aquatarkus" (3:59)
7. "Karn Evil 9: 1st Impression, Pt. 2" (Emerson, Lake) (4:43)
8. "C'est la Vie" (Lake, Peter Sinfield) (4:16)
9. "Hoedown" (Copland) (3:43)
10. "Trilogy" (Emerson, Lake) (8:53)
11. "Honky Tonk Train Blues" (Meade "Lux" Lewis, arr. by Emerson) (3:09)
12. "Black Moon" (Emerson, Lake, Palmer) (Single version) (4:46)
13. "Lucky Man" (Lake) (4:37)
14. "I Believe in Father Christmas" (Lake) (Original single version) (3:30)

== 1984 German Track listing ==
The German version has different versions of tracks 1, 5, 6, and 8 and three additional tracks.

No.	Title	Writer(s)	From album	Length
1.	"Hoedown"	Aaron Copland	Welcome Back My Friends..., 1974	4:31
2.	"Lucky Man"	Greg Lake	Emerson Lake & Palmer	4:40
3.	"Karn Evil 9: 1st Impression, Part 2"	Keith Emerson	Brain Salad Surgery	4:46
4.	"Jerusalem"	William Blake, Hubert Parry	Brain Salad Surgery	2:48
5.	"Peter Gunn"	Henry Mancini	Emerson, Lake and Palmer in Concert	4:31
6.	"Fanfare for the Common Man"	Copland	Works Volume 1	9:44
7.	"Still...You Turn Me On"	Lake	Brain Salad Surgery	2:55
8.	"Tiger in a Spotlight"	Emerson, Lake, Palmer, Peter Sinfield	Emerson, Lake and Palmer in Concert	4:14
9.	"Trilogy"	Emerson, Lake	Trilogy	8:56
10.	"C'est la Vie"	Lake, Sinfield	Emerson, Lake and Palmer in Concert	4:21
11.	"New Orleans"	Carl Palmer	Works Volume 1	2:48
12.	"Toccata"	Alberto Ginastera, arr. by Emerson	Welcome Back My Friends...	7:28
Total length:				61:42

== Charts ==
Chart (1980)	Peak position
US Billboard 200	108

== Certifications ==
Region	Certification	Certified units/sales
Spain (Promusicae)	Gold	50,000^{^}
United Kingdom (BPI)	Gold	100,000^{^}
^{^} Shipments figures based on certification alone.
