= Live at the Royal Albert Hall (Emerson, Lake and Palmer album) =

Live album by Emerson, Lake & Palmer
- Released: 1 February 1993
- Recorded: 2-3 October 1992; Royal Albert Hall, London, England
- Genre: Progressive rock
- Length: 70:22
- Label: Sanctuary Midline

Emerson, Lake & Palmer chronology
Black Moon (1992)	Live at the Royal Albert Hall (1993)	The Return of the Manticore (1993)

Emerson, Lake & Palmer live chronology
Emerson, Lake & Palmer in Concert (1979)	Live at the Royal Albert Hall (1993)	King Biscuit Flower Hour: Greatest Hits Live (1997)

Professional ratings
Review scores
Source	Rating
AllMusic	3/5 stars
Classic Rock	3/5 stars
MusicHound Rock	2/5 stars

Live at the Royal Albert Hall is a live album by Emerson, Lake & Palmer. It was recorded at two concerts at the Royal Albert Hall during the Black Moon tour in early October 1992. The shows were the band's first concert appearances in their native England since 1974. They were broadcast live on BBC Radio One, and the band was introduced on stage by DJ Alan "Fluff" Freeman, audible at the beginning of the first track.

== Track listing ==
No songwriting credits appear on the album. The credits below were taken from previous releases of the tracks.

No.	Title	Writer(s)	Length
1.	"Karn Evil 9: 1st Impression, Pt. 2"	Keith Emerson, Greg Lake	1:50
2.	"Tarkus: a. "Eruption"; b. "Stones of Years"; c. "Iconoclast"	a. Emerson; b. Emerson, Lake; c. Emerson	9:26
3.	"Knife Edge"	Leoš Janáček, Johann Sebastian Bach, Emerson, Lake, Richard Fraser	5:26
4.	"Paper Blood"	Emerson, Lake, Carl Palmer	4:09
5.	"Romeo and Juliet"	Sergei Prokofiev	3:41
6.	"Creole Dance"	Alberto Ginastera	3:20
7.	"Still...You Turn Me On"	Lake	3:13
8.	"Lucky Man"	Lake	4:38
9.	"Black Moon"	Emerson, Lake, Palmer	6:31
10.	"Pirates"	Emerson, Lake, Peter Sinfield	13:21
11.	"Finale: a. "Fanfare for the Common Man"; b. "America"; c. "Rondo""	a. Aaron Copland; b. Leonard Bernstein, Stephen Sondheim; c. Dave Brubeck	14:40

== Personnel ==
- Keith Emerson – keyboards
- Greg Lake – bass, guitars (on 7 and 8) [uncredited], vocals
- Carl Palmer – drums

== Video release ==
A video version of the concerts was released on DVD, VHS, and LaserDisc in 1996. It has a slightly different running order (closer to the actual setlist for the tour) and contains three songs not included on the CD ("From the Beginning", "Honky Tonk Train Blues" and "Pictures at an Exhibition"), but omits "Still...You Turn Me On" and "Black Moon". In addition, with the exception of "Lucky Man", the video contains different performances of those songs which it has in common with the CD, i.e. wherever the CD used a rendition of a song from one of the Royal Albert Hall concerts, the video used a rendition of the song from the other one.

The original DVD cover shows pictures of the band members, but a reissue in early 2009 by Shout! Factory (who has also reissued much of the band's CD catalog) was changed to match the CD cover.

DVD track listing:

1. "Introduction"
2. "Karn Evil 9: 1st Impression, Pt. 2"
3. "Tarkus"
  - "Eruption"
  - "Stones of Years"
  - "Iconoclast"
4. "Knife-Edge"
5. "Paper Blood"
6. "Creole Dance"
7. "From the Beginning" (Lake)
8. "Lucky Man"
9. "Honky Tonk Train Blues" (Meade Lux Lewis)
10. "Romeo and Juliet"
11. "Pirates"
12. "Pictures at an Exhibition"
  - "Promenade" (Modest Mussorgsky, arr. by Emerson)
  - "The Gnome" (Mussorgsky, Palmer)
  - "Promenade" (Mussorgsky, Lake)
  - "The Hut of Baba Yaga" (Mussorgsky, arr. by Emerson)
  - "Drum Solo"
  - "The Hut of Baba Yaga"
  - "The Great Gates of Kiev" (Mussorgsky, Lake)
13. "Finale"
  - "Fanfare for the Common Man"
  - "America"
  - "Rondo"

== Charts ==
Chart (1993)	Peak position
German Albums (Offizielle Top 100)	92
Japanese Albums (Oricon)	89
