= Love Beach =

Studio album by Emerson, Lake & Palmer
- Released: 17 November 1978
- Recorded: Summer 1978
- Studios: Compass Point, Nassau, Bahamas
- Genres: Pop rock; soft rock; progressive rock
- Length: 40:40
- Label: Atlantic
- Producer: Keith Emerson

Emerson, Lake & Palmer chronology
Works Volume 2 (1977)	Love Beach (1978)	In Concert (1979)

Singles from Love Beach
- 1. "All I Want Is You" Released: 24 November 1978

Love Beach is the seventh studio album by English progressive rock band Emerson, Lake & Palmer. It was released on 17 November 1978 by Atlantic Records as their final studio album released prior to their split in the following year. By the end of their 1977–1978 North American tour internal relations had started to deteriorate, but the group were contractually required to produce one more album. They retreated to Nassau, Bahamas as tax exiles to record Love Beach with lyricist Peter Sinfield who is credited as a co-writer of each track except "Canario". After Greg Lake and Carl Palmer had finished recording their parts they left the island, leaving Keith Emerson to finish the album himself.

The album received negative reviews from critics. It reached No. 48 on the UK Albums Chart and No. 55 on the US Billboard 200 where it reached gold certification by the Recording Industry Association of America in January 1979 for selling 500,000 copies. It spawned one single released in the UK, Lake and Sinfield's track "All I Want is You". The album was not supported with a tour and in early 1979, Emerson, Lake & Palmer disbanded.

== Background and recording ==
In March 1978, the band finished their ten-month North American tour in support of Works Volume 1 (1977). Several early shows featured the group playing with a symphony orchestra on stage (as in Montreal at the Olympic Stadium) but it proved too costly to operate and the idea was dropped. Despite the group preferring to rest, they were encouraged by Atlantic Records president Ahmet Ertegun to record a new album. He also reminded them that they had to deliver one more. Emerson recalled the band's meeting with Ertegun and his suggestion for the group to make "a commercial album" which Emerson felt reluctant to do. Lake recalled that Ertegun threatened to decline the band the prospect of solo albums if they refused to work together, so they agreed. The need for a commercial album suited Lake's method of songwriting, as he was responsible for the group's radio friendly songs such as "Lucky Man" and "From the Beginning". Emerson therefore "eased up on my opinions to an extent, bit my nails, and gave him the freedom he kept asking for on side one".

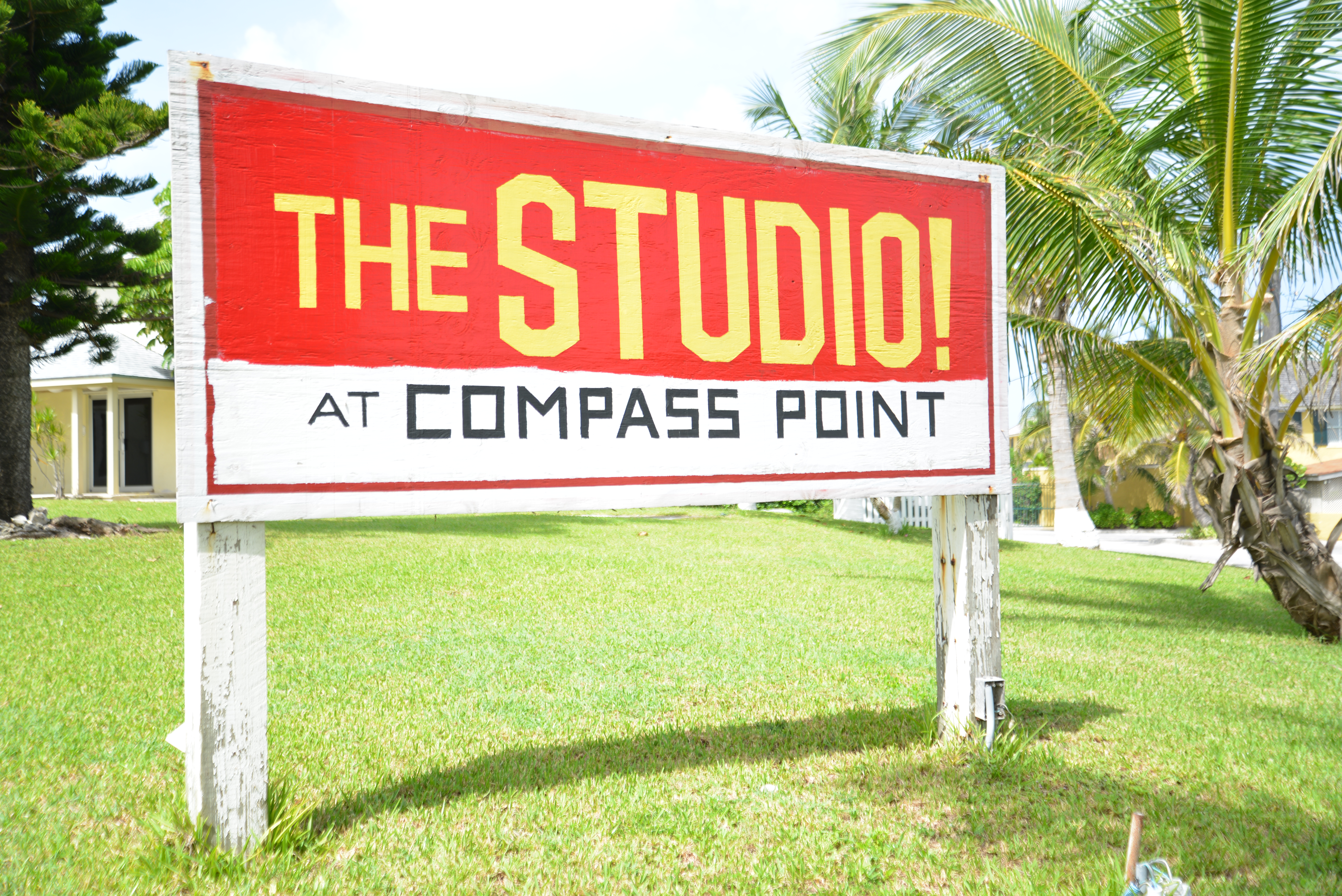
Compass Point Studios

The band had become tax exiles and decided to record in Nassau in the Bahamas where Emerson and Lake were renting homes. Recording took place in 1978 at Compass Point Studios without a dedicated producer—Lake having produced all of their previous albums. Early pressings of Love Beach carried no producer credit, but production and mixing of the album were largely carried out by Emerson. Jack Nuber and Karl Pitterson were engineers. The sessions were difficult due to the increasingly strained relations between the three musicians. Emerson's increasing drug use had additionally started to affect his ability to work or collaborate with others.

Lyricist Peter Sinfield, who had worked with Lake in King Crimson and on his collection of songs on Works Volume 1, was asked by band manager Stewart Young to join them in Nassau and assist Lake in writing the lyrics. Though frictions had arisen between Sinfield and Lake by this time Sinfield thought a break would be good for him and accepted; however, because of the limited amount of time he had, he requested that he work alone. Upon arrival, Sinfield found the group were barely talking to each other and he left the island when he was finished working on the album. Lake and Palmer followed suit after they had put down their parts, leaving Emerson who put "the whole album together ... and sent it off".

Emerson was particularly upset about the album's title, which Atlantic Records had taken from one of the album's tracks by Lake and Sinfield, itself named after a stretch of beach on Nassau. The front cover was taken on an island off Salt Cay, depicting the group as biographer Edward Macan described as "bare-chested late-seventies disco stars". Emerson then organised a booth at Chicago's O'Hare International Airport to conduct a survey on the public's opinion on the album with a questionnaire. The overall opinion was of disagreement of the title which Emerson presented back to Atlantic, but the label refused to change.

== Content ==
The first side of the album consists of short, pop-oriented tracks mostly penned by Lake and Sinfield. Record World said that the single "All I Want Is You" "has a powerful bass line, picturesque lyrics and Lake's eerily powerful vocals."

Side two consists of "Memoirs of an Officer and a Gentleman", a 20-minute track in four distinct parts. It is a concept piece that tells a story of a romance between a soldier and his fiancée during World War II, a shift from their previous fantasy-inspired epics such as "Tarkus" and "Karn Evil 9". Sinfield wrote all of the lyrics and later felt relieved to find a lyrical theme that worked for the song given the limited amount of time he had to work. Emerson considered the words "a bit gross".

Within the suite, Emerson quotes two classical compositions. He begins "Love at First Sight" by playing the first eight bars of Frédéric Chopin's Étude Op. 10, No. 1, and he uses Chopin's harmonic structure for the song. In "Honourable Company", Emerson plays several militaristic signals including "Rule, Britannia!".

== Release and reception ==
Professional ratings
Review scores
Source	Rating
AllMusic	1.5/5 stars
Classic Rock	1/5 stars
MusicHound Rock: The Essential Album Guide	1.5/5 stars

Love Beach was released in November 1978. The album was not toured or promoted by the band, although they did play the single "All I Want Is You" on Top of the Pops. The album ultimately went Gold, selling more than 500,000 copies. Upon release Palmer spent two months arranging a farewell tour, but ongoing disagreements in the group led to the idea being shelved.

Critical and fan appraisal of the album is mainly negative; some consider it the nadir of ELP's output, while others consider the reunion album In the Hot Seat to be worse. Writing in Rolling Stone at the time of the album's release, reviewer Michael Bloom said that "Love Beach isn't simply bad; it's downright pathetic. Stale and full of ennui, this album makes washing the dishes seem a more creative act by comparison". The Globe and Mail noted that "the most interesting fusion of styles occurs on the raunchy 'Taste of My Love', which is reminiscent of Roxy Music". Emerson later called the album "an embarrassment against everything I've worked for".

In 2021, Classic Rock wrote: "More than the efforts of Johnny Rotten and Joe Strummer, Love Beach was the thing that killed prog in the 70s. ’Nuff said."

== Track listing ==
Side one
No.	Title	Writer(s)	Length
1.	"All I Want Is You"	Greg Lake, Peter Sinfield	2:33
2.	"Love Beach"	Lake, Sinfield	2:43
3.	"Taste of My Love"	Lake, Sinfield	3:30
4.	"The Gambler"	Keith Emerson, Lake, Sinfield	3:20
5.	"For You"	Lake, Sinfield	4:25
6.	"Canario" (from Fantasía para un gentilhombre)	Joaquín Rodrigo	3:57

Side two
No.	Title	Writer(s)	Length
1.	"Memoirs of an Officer and a Gentleman": a. "Prologue/The Education of a Gentleman" (5:33); b. "Love at First Sight" (5:37); c. "Letters from the Front" (5:18); d. "Honourable Company (A March)" (3:45)	Emerson, Sinfield, except d.: Emerson	20:13

2011 reissue bonus tracks

1. "Canario (Rehearsal 1978)" - 4:35
2. "Taste of My Love (Rehearsal 1978)" - 3:02
3. "Letters from the Front (Rehearsal 1978)" - 8:50

2017 Deluxe Edition

Bonus tracks of The Original 1978 Album (2017 Remaster), all previously unreleased
No.	Title	Writer(s)	Length
8.	"All I Want is You" (1978 alternative mix)	Lake, Sinfield
9.	"Taste of My Love" (1978 alternative mix)	Lake, Sinfield
10.	"The Gambler" (1978 alternative mix)	Emerson, Lake, Sinfield
11.	"For You" (1978 alternative mix)	Lake, Sinfield
12.	"Letters from the Front" (1978 alternative mix) (incorrectly identified on CD and download editions as "Honourable Company (A March)")	Emerson, Sinfield
13.	"Canario" (1978 rehearsal outtake)	Joaquín Rodrigo
14.	"Letters from the Front" (1978 rehearsal outtake) (correctly identified)	Emerson, Sinfield
15.	"Prologue / The Education of a Gentleman" (1978 rehearsal outtake)	Emerson, Sinfield

== Personnel ==
Emerson, Lake & Palmer

- Keith Emerson – keyboards, synthesizers, production, mixing
- Greg Lake – vocals, guitars, guitar synthesizer, bass, harmonica
- Carl Palmer – drums, percussion

Additional personnel

- Peter Sinfield – lyrics

Technicial personnel

- Jack Nuber and Karl Pitterson – engineering

== Singles ==
- "All I Want Is You/Tiger in a Spotlight" (UK release)
- "Canario/All I Want Is You" (German release)

== Charts ==
Chart (1978)	Peak position
Australian Albums (Kent Music Report)	82
Canada Top Albums/CDs (RPM)	52
UK Albums (Official Charts)	48
US Billboard 200	55

== Certifications ==
Region	Certification	Certified units/sales
United Kingdom (BPI)	Silver	60,000^{^}
United States (RIAA)	Gold	500,000^{^}
^{^} Shipments figures based on certification alone.

== Sources ==
- Forrester, George; Hanson, Martyn (2013). Emerson, Lake and Palmer: The Show That Never Ends ... Encore. Foruli Classics. ISBN 978-1-905-79239-9.
- Macan, Edward (2006). Endless Enigma: A Musical Biography of Emerson, Lake & Palmer. Open Court Publishing Company. ISBN 0-8126-9596-8.
