= Emerson, Lake & Palmer (album) =

Studio album by Emerson, Lake & Palmer
- Released: 20 November 1970
- Recorded: July–September 1970
- Studios: Advision, London
- Genres: Progressive rock; classical
- Length: 41:13
- Labels: Island (UK); Cotillion (US)
- Producer: Greg Lake

Emerson, Lake & Palmer chronology
| Emerson, Lake & Palmer (1970) | Tarkus (1971) |

Singles from Emerson, Lake & Palmer
- 1. "Lucky Man" Released: December 1970

Emerson, Lake & Palmer is the debut studio album by English progressive rock band Emerson, Lake & Palmer. It was released in the United Kingdom by Island Records on 20 November 1970, and in the United States by Cotillion Records in January 1971. After the group formed in the spring of 1970, they entered rehearsals and prepared material for an album which became a mix of original songs and rock arrangements of classical music. The album was recorded at Advision Studios in July 1970, when the band had yet to perform live. Lead vocalist and bassist/guitarist Greg Lake produced it.

Upon release, the album went to No. 4 in the UK and No. 18 in the US. Lake's song "Lucky Man" was released as a single in 1970 and helped the group achieve radio airplay; it peaked at No. 48 in the US. After a warm-up gig in Plymouth, the band performed songs from the album at their next, a spot at the 1970 Isle of Wight Festival which propelled them to widespread fame. In 2012, Steven Wilson prepared a special edition that features a new stereo and 5.1 surround sound mixes, plus bonus material.

== Songs ==
=== Side one ===
"The Barbarian" is an arrangement of Béla Bartók's 1911 piano piece Allegro Barbaro, but original early pressings of the album credit the track to the group. Bartók's widow contacted the band shortly after the album's release to request that the credit be corrected.

"Take a Pebble" was written by Lake, with the primary sections being a jazz keyboard arrangement by Emerson, and the middle section being a folk guitar work by Lake with water-like percussion effects from Palmer, plus bits of clapping and whistling.

"Knife-Edge" is based on the first movement of Leoš Janáček's orchestral piece Sinfonietta (1926), with an instrumental middle section that includes an extended quotation from the Allemande of Johann Sebastian Bach's first French Suite No. 1 in D minor, BWV 812, but played on an organ rather than a clavichord or piano. Lake provided the lyrics, with assistance from Richard Fraser, a member of the group's road crew.

=== Side two ===
"The Three Fates" is a three-part "pseudo suite", written and predominantly performed by Emerson. Each section is named after the three sisters of Greek mythology known as the three Three Fates (or Moirai): Clotho, Lachesis, and Atropos. The "Clotho" movement was recorded at the Royal Festival Hall in London, with Emerson playing the venue's pipe organ. "Lachesis" is a short piano piece that features baroque and jazz influences, ending in grand, sweeping arpeggios. "Atropos" sees Emerson play a piano vamp in 7/8 with percussion accompaniment from Palmer. An improvisational section is played on top, which transforms into a polymetrically played repeated sequence in 4/4 time. The resonance of the final chords is curtailed by the sound of explosions.

Palmer's solo spot "Tank" was composed with Emerson. The first section features Emerson on clavinet and piano, Lake on bass and Palmer on drums. The middle section is a drum solo. The final section features Emerson on clavinet and Moog synthesizer.

"Lucky Man" is a song written by Lake on the acoustic guitar when he was 12. It features an improvised Moog synthesizer solo by Emerson at the end, liberally using portamento. A 5.1 surround sound mix of the song was released on a 2000 reissue of Brain Salad Surgery.

== Artwork ==
The album's cover is a painting by British artist Nic Dartnell. Although it has been said to be originally intended for the American group Spirit, and that the bald-headed man on the left of the cover is Spirit's drummer, Ed Cassidy, the artist denied this in an interview with Mike Goldstein of RockPoP:

"I'd like to take a moment and dispel a rumor that, according to Wikipedia, the image is somehow linked to the LA band Spirit. The fact is that, at the time I painted the ELP 'Bird', I also painted a portrait of Spirit which I sent to them in LA. A very similar bird was featured in the corner of that painting. I got a message from Spirit to say that if they had received their painting in time they would have put it on the back of Twelve Dreams of Dr. Sardonicus. I became friendly with Randy California over the years and I took the photograph that is on his 1982 12" EP All Along the Watchtower. The bald image in "Bird" has no connection to Ed Cassidy of Spirit and doesn't look anything like him. Ed still has the Spirit portrait – so I'm told."

— Nic Dartnell,

== Critical reception ==
Professional ratings
Review scores
| Source | Rating |
|---|---|
| AllMusic | 4.5/5 stars |
| Christgau's Record Guide | C |
| Rolling Stone | (favorable) |
| Classic Rock Revisited | A |
| The Daily Vault | A− |
| MusicHound Rock | 3/5 stars |
| Sound & Vision | 4.5/5 stars |

Upon release, Loyd Grossmas at Rolling Stone enthused "this is such a good album it is best heard as a whole". Reviewing in Christgau's Record Guide: Rock Albums of the Seventies (1981), Robert Christgau said: "This opens with 'The Barbarian,' a keyboard showpiece (not to slight all the flailing and booming underneath) replete with the shifts of tempo, time, key, and dynamics beloved of these bozos. Does the title mean they see themselves as rock and roll Huns sacking nineteenth-century 'classical' tradition? Or do they think they're like Verdi portraying Ethiopians in Aida? From such confusions flow music as clunky as these heavy-handed semi-improvisations and would-be tone poems."

In a retrospective review, Bruce Eder at AllMusic claimed it "showcased the group at its least pretentious and most musicianly" while The Daily Vault hailed it as a "dizzying mix of keyboard solos, incredible bass work, excellent vocals and powerful drums". Paul Stump's 1997 History of Progressive Rock commented of the album, "Still hailed by many as the band's best effort, it established the blueprint for a musical style which, for all the bullish puffing of the band's 'progressive' credentials, they would develop hardly at all." However, he found significant shortcomings with all of the individual songs, excepting only "Atropos", which he called the album's best track.

== Track listing ==
Side one
| No. | Title | Writer(s) | Length |
|---|---|---|---|
| 1. | "The Barbarian" | Béla Bartók, arr. Keith Emerson, Greg Lake, Carl Palmer | 4:27 |
| 2. | "Take a Pebble" | Lake | 12:32 |
| 3. | "Knife-Edge" | Emerson, Lake, Richard Fraser, Leoš Janáček, Johann Sebastian Bach | 5:04 |
| Total length: | | | 22:03 |

Side two
| No. | Title | Writer(s) | Length |
|---|---|---|---|
| 1. | "The Three Fates": a. "Clotho" (1:48); b. "Lachesis" (2:43); c. "Atropos" (3:15) | Emerson | 7:46 |
| 2. | "Tank" | Emerson, Palmer | 6:49 |
| 3. | "Lucky Man" | Lake | 4:37 |
| Total length: | | | 19:12 |

=== 2012 reissue ===
In May 2012, Steven Wilson of Porcupine Tree remixed the album for a three-disc reissue containing the original mix, the Wilson remix, and a DVD-Audio with Wilson's 5.1 surround sound version and a higher-bitrate version of his stereo mix.

CD 2 – The Alternate ELP New 2012 Stereo Mixes
| No. | Title | Writer(s) | Length |
|---|---|---|---|
| 1. | "The Barbarian" | | 4:32 |
| 2. | "Take a Pebble" (Lake; arr. Emerson, Lake & Palmer, but not always credited) | | 12:36 |
| 3. | "Knife-Edge (with extended outro)" | | 5:38 |
| 4. | "Promenade" | Modest Mussorgsky, arr. Lake, Emerson / lyrics: Lake | 1:29 |
| 5. | "The Three Fates: Atropos" | | 3:11 |
| 6. | "Rave Up" | Emerson, Lake, Palmer | 5:02 |
| 7. | "Drum Solo" | Palmer | 3:02 |
| 8. | "Lucky Man" | | 4:39 |
| Total length: | | | 40:09 |

Bonus tracks
| No. | Title | Length |
|---|---|---|
| 9. | "Take a Pebble (alternate take)" | 3:40 |
| 10. | "Knife-Edge (alternate take)" | 4:19 |
| 11. | "Lucky Man (first Greg Lake solo version)" | 3:02 |
| 12. | "Lucky Man (alternate take)" | 4:41 |
| Total length: | | 55:51 |

The remixed versions have different track listings from the original album. The first two sections of "The Three Fates" ("Clotho" and "Lachesis") and "Tank" were omitted, for multitrack tapes for these pieces were unavailable; meanwhile, unreleased material was added. "Knife-Edge" has an extended ending; due to the difficulty of reproducing the song's original tape slowdown ending digitally, Wilson decided to include the end of the original album session at its original speed. The 5.1 remix replaces "Tank" with an unreleased instrumental called "Rave Up", which bears some similarity to the instrumental section of "Mass" on Tarkus.

The remixed stereo versions include all of the above while adding more unreleased material: a vocal version of Modest Mussorgsky's "Promenade" (the first live version of which appears on Pictures at an Exhibition) replaces the missing sections of "The Three Fates"; a new otherwise untitled "Drum Solo" by Carl Palmer (similar but not identical to a section of "Tank") is added between "Rave Up" and "Lucky Man"; "Lucky Man" is followed by an unfinished alternate take of "Take a Pebble", complete with some studio banter, an unreleased take of "Knife-Edge" (lacking vocals and final section), and two versions of "Lucky Man", the first being Greg Lake's original demo, the second an unreleased complete band version.

== Personnel ==
Emerson, Lake & Palmer

- Keith Emerson – Hammond organ, piano, clavinet, pipe organ, Moog modular synthesizer
- Greg Lake – vocals, bass, acoustic and electric guitar
- Carl Palmer – drums, percussion

Production

- Greg Lake – producer
- Eddy Offord – engineer
- Emerson, Lake & Palmer – arrangement, direction
- Nic Dartnell – cover painting

== Charts ==
=== Weekly charts ===
| Chart (1970–71) | Peak position |
|---|---|
| Australian Albums (Kent Music Report) | 9 |
| Canada Top Albums/CDs (RPM) | 17 |
| Dutch Albums (Album Top 100) | 4 |
| German Albums (Offizielle Top 100) | 7 |
| Italian Albums (Musica e Dischi) | 20 |
| Japanese Albums (Oricon) | 66 |
| Norwegian Albums (VG-lista) | 18 |
| UK Albums (Official Charts) | 4 |
| US Billboard 200 | 18 |

| Chart (2016) | Peak position |
|---|---|
| UK Independent Albums (Official Charts) | 45 |
| UK Rock & Metal Albums (Official Charts) | 35 |

=== Year-end charts ===
| Chart (1971) | Position |
|---|---|
| Dutch Albums (Album Top 100) | 46 |
| German Albums (Offizielle Top 100) | 16 |

== Certifications ==
| Region | Certification | Certified units/sales |
|---|---|---|
| United Kingdom (BPI) | Gold | 100,000^{^} |
| United States (RIAA) | Gold | 500,000^{^} |
^{^} Shipments figures based on certification alone.
