= Tarkus =

1971 studio album by Emerson, Lake & Palmer

Studio album by Emerson, Lake & Palmer
- Released: 4 June 1971
- Recorded: January–February 1971
- Studios: Advision, Fitzrovia, London
- Genre: Progressive rock
- Length: 39:05
- Labels: Island (UK); Cotillion (US)
- Producer: Greg Lake

Emerson, Lake & Palmer chronology
Emerson, Lake & Palmer (1970)	Tarkus (1971)	Pictures at an Exhibition (1971)

Emerson, Lake & Palmer studio chronology
Emerson, Lake & Palmer (1970)	Tarkus (1971)	Trilogy (1972)

Singles from Tarkus
- 1. "Stones of Years" Released: September 1971

Tarkus is the second studio album by English progressive rock band Emerson, Lake & Palmer, released on 4 June 1971 by Island Records. Following their debut tour across Europe during the second half of 1970, the group paused touring commitments in January 1971 to record a new album at Advision Studios in London. Greg Lake produced the album with Eddy Offord as engineer.

Side one features the 20-minute conceptual title track written by keyboardist Keith Emerson, the opening of which created friction between Lake and Emerson that almost split the group, but Lake agreed to pursue it and contributed musical ideas for it and wrote the lyrics. Side two features a collection of unrelated tracks of different styles. The artwork was designed by William Neal.

Tarkus went to number one on the UK Albums Chart, becoming the only album by the band to do so. It was a top 10 album worldwide, including the US, where it peaked at number 9. The album reached gold certification in the UK and US, the latter for 500,000 copies sold. It has been reissued and remastered several times, including a new stereo and 5.1 surround sound edition by Steven Wilson, with bonus and previously unreleased tracks from the original sessions, released in 2012.

== Background and recording ==
After their debut live gigs in August 1970, the band toured across the UK and Europe for the rest of the year, during which their debut album, Emerson, Lake & Palmer, was released. While on tour, Emerson found that he and drummer Carl Palmer were exploring more complex rhythmic ideas. He took patterns that Palmer was playing on his practice drum pads and found that they complemented runs that he had developed on the piano, and used this as a basis for material on Tarkus. The group approached the album by having a centrepiece track in order to establish a concept, but a definite story or idea for it had not been discussed at this stage.

The group paused touring commitments in December 1970 and set the following month aside to record. As with their debut, the band recorded at Advision Studios in London with Lake handling the production duties and Eddy Offord returning as engineer. Early into the sessions Emerson presented the basis of the title track to Lake and Palmer; Lake was less than enthusiastic with its direction and threatened to leave the group. A subsequent meeting amongst the band and their management convinced Lake to stay, and he went on to contribute to the track and most of the other songs on the album including the lyrics, for which he used the artwork as inspiration. Although Lake thought the opening was "too demonstrative" for the sake of being clever, he did not want to split the group over such an issue and got into the album as recording went on. The band could only work out "Tarkus" during the January 1971 studio sessions, so they booked further time at Advision in February to work on side two, for which they had no material prepared.

== Songs ==
=== Side one ===
Side one is occupied by the 20-minute title track which has seven sections. It was written by Emerson, with Lake credited for "Battlefield" and contributions to "Stones of Years" and "Mass". It is a conceptual piece in which its narrative remains ambiguous and open to interpretation, but the artwork depicts the Tarkus character in the form of an armadillo tank hybrid who is born and loses a fight with a manticore, which concludes with the appearance of an aquatic version of Tarkus named Aquatarkus. Lake said the song is about "the futility of conflict, expressed in this context in terms of soldiers and war — but it's broader than that. The words are about revolution, the revolution that's gone, that has happened. Where has it got anybody? Nowhere." He added that the songs concern "the hypocrisy of it all" and the closing march "a joke".

Emerson wrote the first musical ideas for "Tarkus" from a 10/8 rhythm that Palmer had played on his practice drum pad backstage at a gig. He composed the entire piece in six days on his upright piano at his London apartment, and wrote the score on manuscript. After the band rehearsed it for six days, they put it to tape; Emerson said once Lake and Palmer had mastered the 5/4 and 10/8 rhythms, "everything else flowed." Emerson transposed "a fleeting run of one bar" from the Allegro of Sergei Prokofiev's Piano Concerto No. 3 to bridge a transition between two parts of "Eruption". The section is played in a 5/4 time signature which was a "frustrating" meter for Lake to play. Emerson wanted the "Aquatarkus" section to have a sound that resembled a snorkel tube as he was into scuba diving at the time, so he generated one from his Moog synthesizer and played it during the marching beat. The group would not record a longer track in the studio until 1973, with the 29-minute "Karn Evil 9".

=== Side two ===
Side two features six songs unrelated to the conceptual title track. "Jeremy Bender" is a rendition of the Stephen Foster song "Oh! Susanna" and Emerson's performance was influenced by Floyd Cramer, one of his favourite pianists. It came about when Emerson was playing the song's chord progressions on a honky-tonk piano and incorporated some fifth-root chords, which the band liked. The closing features handclaps from Emerson and Palmer. "Bitches Crystal" originated from the idea of playing a boogie-woogie part in a 6/8 time signature, with Emerson naming Dave Brubeck's "Countdown" as an influence to his playing on it. The band had a firm idea on the direction of the track early on, although some parts were difficult for the group to put down. Lake was not a fan of Brubeck as Emerson was, but Palmer was into Brubeck's drummer Joe Morello and Emerson noticed his style of drumming in Palmer's performance.

"The Only Way (Hymn)" contains themes from Toccata and Fugue in F major, BWV 540 and Prelude and Fugue VI, BWV 851 by Bach, and features Emerson on the pipe organ at St Mark's church in Finchley, north London which was put down using a mobile recording facility. Lake wrote the lyrics after the music was recorded; Emerson and Palmer considered the religious implication in the line: "Can you believe God makes you breathe, why did he lose six million Jews?" was a bit too strong, but they went along with it. "Infinite Space (Conclusion)" features Emerson playing a 7-ft Bechstein grand piano, and came about from the band's decision to follow "The Only Way" with a laid-back piece.

Emerson said Led Zeppelin were a loose inspiration for "A Time and a Place", and was listening to the band a lot at the time. He recalled the track being put down in about three takes. Although not credited, the music to "Are You Ready, Eddy?" was largely inspired by Bobby Troup's 1956 song "The Girl Can't Help It". Its title was a phrase the band yelled out to Offord when they were ready to record. Palmer is heard saying "They've only go' 'am or cheese!", which is what an elderly lady at Advision said to the band when they sent her round to a nearby sandwich shop and announce what they had available. Emerson said Palmer could mimic her mix of Greek and cockney accents "wonderfully", and recalled the confusion from some American fans who could not understand what it was about. The track was "an impromptu jam" and a one-off take, and played in celebration of completing work on Tarkus.

One track left as an outtake was Lake's "Oh My Father", an autobiographical ballad dealing with grief over the recent death of his father. Featuring layers of acoustic guitars, piano, and a wah-wah guitar solo it might have balanced the keyboard-heavy tracks on the album but Lake ultimately thought it was too personal for release; it was eventually included on the 2012 deluxe reissue. Another outtake unearthed for the reissue, "Unknown Ballad", was a song actually titled "Just A Dream" recorded during the sessions when Emerson and Palmer were out of the studio, featuring Lake on piano and his friend Gary Margetts (of the group Spontaneous Combustion) on lead vocal, with brother Tris Margetts on bass and Lake helping out on backing harmonies.

== Artwork and title ==
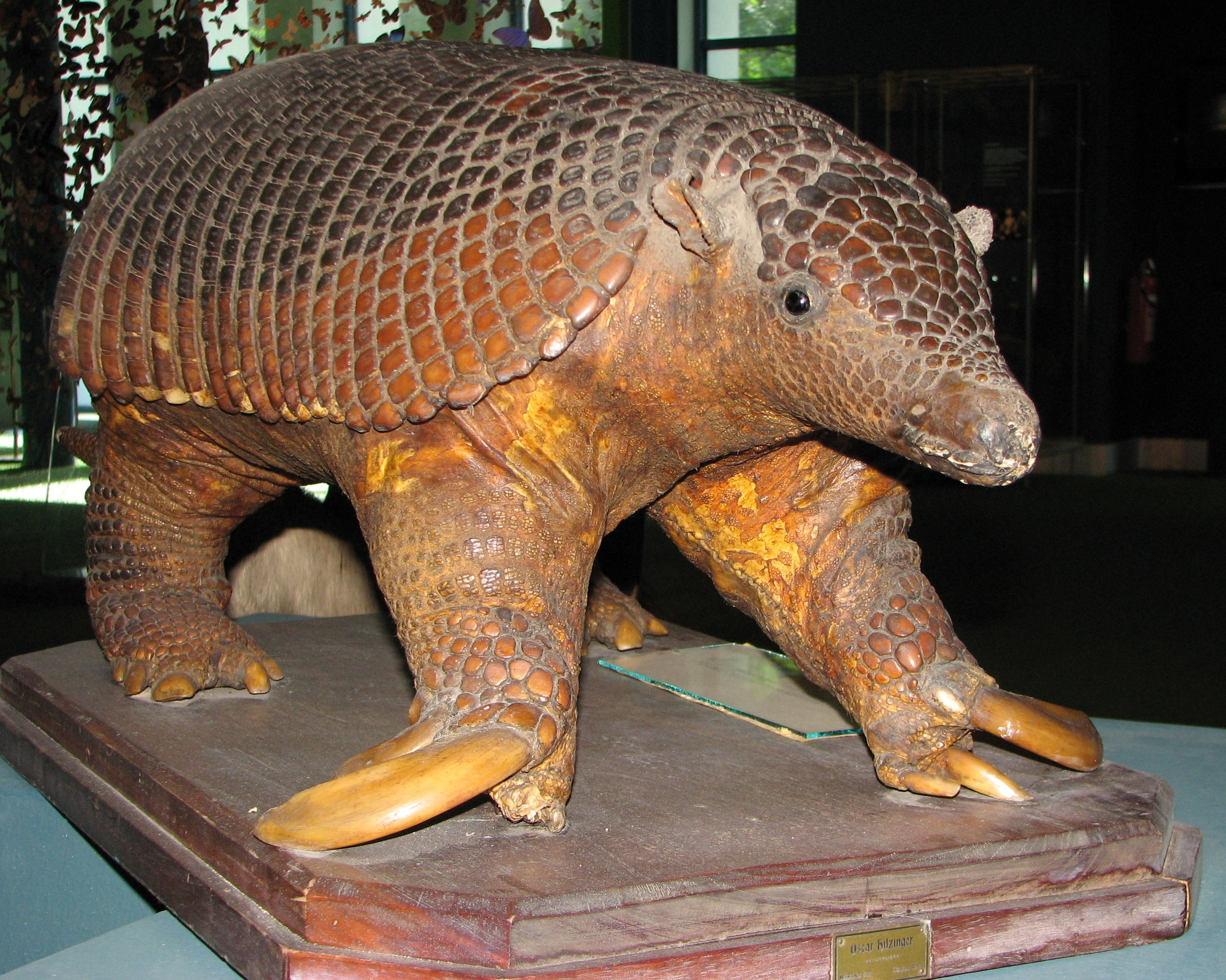
The front cover depicts a giant armadillo tank

The album was packaged in a gatefold sleeve and features artwork by English-born Scottish artist William Neal, whose armadillo has since become an iconic image in progressive rock. Neal was involved with the London-based CCS Associates which typically produced art for reggae albums but occasionally they were given other records to work on, which was the case with Tarkus. When the band rejected the designs already completed, Neal recalled: "On one of my drawings, there was a small doodle at the bottom of the page. This was of an armadillo with tank tracks on it but it was just an idea that wasn't really going anywhere." It originated from one of Neal's initial designs of a machine gun with a belt of bullets replaced by a row of keyboard keys, which he inadvertently sketched on with a pencil during a phone conversation which produced the tank image. Emerson liked it and suggested it be developed "into more of a cartoon story", as by which point he had written "Tarkus" and thought the music fit with the imagery. Neal was given a copy of the album to listen to while he completed the final cover, which inspired the other drawings. The gatefold presents eleven panels that illustrate the events of the title track, beginning with an erupting volcano, below which Tarkus emerges from an egg. Tarkus then faces a number of cybernetic creatures, culminating in the battle against the manticore which stings Tarkus's eye, and Tarkus retreats bleeding into a river.

Emerson went away with Neal's designs and began to think of album titles. "To everyone, it represented what we were doing in that studio. The next day on my drive up from Sussex the imagery of the armadillo kept hitting me. It had to have a name. Something guttural. It had to begin with the letter 'T' and end with a flourish". Emerson acknowledged that Tarka of Tarka the Otter may have been an inspiration, "but this armadillo needed a science fiction kind of name that represented Charles Darwin's theory of evolution in reverse. Some mutilation of the species caused by radiation", at which point he came up with "Tarkus". The "Tarkus" on the front cover is made from whitened bones from the skeleton of a devoured lizard.

== Release ==
Tarkus was released on 4 June 1971 in the UK on Island Records, appearing two months later in the US by Atlantic Records' subsidiary label Cotillion Records. It is one of only two ELP studio albums to reach the Top 10 in the United States, making it to No. 9 (Trilogy, the following year, got to No. 5), while in Britain it is their only number-one album. Additionally, Tarkus spent a total of 17 weeks in the UK Albums Chart. In Japan the album was released on Atlantic Records. Later vinyl reissues were on the Manticore label.

Tarkus was certified gold in the United States shortly after its release on 26 August 1971.

== Reception ==
Professional ratings
Review scores
Source	Rating
AllMusic	3.5/5 stars
Sound & Vision	4.5/5 stars
Classic Rock Revisited	A
The Daily Vault	A
MusicHound Rock	2/5 stars
Classic Rock	3.5/5 stars

Although it is now considered a quintessential progressive rock album, Tarkus received generally unfavorable reviews from critics upon its release. New Musical Express's Richard Green, who had given high praise to the band's debut, bemoaned that "there are some nice passages, but these are almost completely buried by the overall cacophonous ostentation." In America, David Lebin in Rolling Stone wrote: "Tarkus records the failure of three performers to become creators. Regardless of how fast and how many styles they can play. Emerson, Lake and Palmer will continue turning out mediocrity like Tarkus until they discover what, if anything, it is that they must say on their own and for themselves." On the other hand, Chris Welch at Melody Maker heaped praise, describing the title suite as "dramatic, probing, explosive, full of theatre and convincing grandeur."

François Couture, in a retrospective review for AllMusic, said that Tarkus is "a very solid album, especially to the ears of prog rock fans – no Greg Lake acoustic ballads, no lengthy jazz interludes". Couture concluded, "More accomplished than the trio's first album, but not quite as polished as Brain Salad Surgery, Tarkus is nevertheless a must-have." Paul Stump's 1997 History of Progressive Rock praised the album's title track but criticized the "enervatingly portentous lyrics" and the traditional form of the solos (beginning and ending on downbeats, using blues voicings). He also said the two comedy songs ("Jeremy Bender" and "Are you Ready Eddie?") "have aged embarrassingly."

Emerson said that Tarkus was one of his favourite albums, "not least because the title track has taken on a life of its own".

In 2015, Sean Murphy of PopMatters ranked Tarkus the 21st best classic progressive rock album of all time.

== Reissues ==
In 1993, the album was digitally remastered by Joseph M. Palmaccio and released by Victory Music in Europe and Rhino Records in North America. This was followed by two remasters by the Mobile Fidelity Sound Lab in 1994 that are currently out of print.

In August 2012, Tarkus was reissued by Sony Music and released in a 3 CD pack, containing a stereo mix from the Palmaccio master, a stereo mix in the form of an alternate version of the album, and a 5.1 surround sound mix by Steven Wilson. The set also contains previously unreleased tracks recorded during the sessions.

Tarkus was reissued on record as a 12" picture disc by BMG as part of Record Store Day on 12 June 2021.

== Track listing ==
=== Original vinyl ===
All lyrics are written by Greg Lake; all music is composed by Keith Emerson, except where noted.

Side one—"Tarkus" suite
No.	Title	Music	Length
1.	"Eruption"		2:43
2.	"Stones of Years"	Emerson, Lake	3:43
3.	"Iconoclast"		1:16
4.	"Mass"	Emerson, Lake	3:15
5.	"Manticore"		1:54
6.	"Battlefield"	Lake	4:13
7.	"Aquatarkus"		3:55
Total length:			20:59

Side two
No.	Title	Music	Length
1.	"Jeremy Bender"		1:44
2.	"Bitches Crystal"		3:58
3.	"The Only Way (Hymn)"		3:51
4.	"Infinite Space (Conclusion)"	Emerson, Carl Palmer	3:19
5.	"A Time and a Place"	Emerson, Lake, Palmer	3:01
6.	"Are You Ready, Eddy?"	Emerson, Lake, Palmer	2:13
Total length:			18:06

2010 Japan SHM-CD reissue bonus tracks
No.	Title	Writer(s)	Length
8.	"Prelude and Fugue"	Friedrich Gulda / Performed by Keith Emerson on piano	3:17
Total length:			21:23

=== 2012 Edition ===
CD 2 – The Alternate Tarkus New 2012 Stereo Mixes
No.	Title	Writer(s)	Length
1.	"Tarkus": "Eruption" (Emerson); "Stones of Years" (Emerson, Lake); "Iconoclast" (Emerson); "Mass" (Emerson, Lake); "Manticore" (Emerson); "Battlefield" (Lake); "Aquatarkus" (Emerson)"	Emerson, Lake	20:46
2.	"Jeremy Bender"	Emerson, Lake	1:57
3.	"Bitches Crystal"	Emerson, Lake	3:59
4.	"The Only Way (Hymn)"	Emerson, Lake	3:47
5.	"Infinite Space (Conclusion)"	Emerson, Palmer	3:23
6.	"A Time and a Place"	Emerson, Lake, Palmer	3:03
7.	"Are You Ready, Eddy?"	Emerson, Lake, Palmer	2:12

Bonus tracks
No.	Title	Writer(s)	Length
8.	"Oh, My Father"	Lake	4:07
9.	"Unknown Ballad" ("Just a Dream" by Spontaneous Combustion)	Gary Margetts, Mike Rowe	3:04
10.	"Mass (Alternate take)"	Emerson, Lake	4:30

== Personnel ==
Emerson, Lake & Palmer

- Keith Emerson – Hammond organ, pipe organ at St. Mark's Church, piano, celesta, Moog modular synthesizer, Minimoog
- Greg Lake – vocals, electric and acoustic guitars, bass, production for E. G. Records
- Carl Palmer – drums, assorted percussion

Technicial personnel

- Eddy "Are You Ready" Offord – engineer
- William Neal – paintings (C.C.S. Assoc.)

== Charts ==
=== Weekly charts ===
Chart (1971)	Peak position
Australian Albums (Kent Music Report)	6
Canada Top Albums/CDs (RPM)	12
Dutch Albums (Album Top 100)	6
Finnish Albums (The Official Finnish Charts)	6
German Albums (Offizielle Top 100)	4
Italian Albums (Musica e Dischi)	1
Japanese Albums (Oricon)	55
Norwegian Albums (VG-lista)	7
Spanish Albums Chart	1
UK Albums (Official Charts)	1
US Billboard 200	9

Chart (2016)	Peak position
UK Independent Albums (Official Charts)	43
UK Rock & Metal Albums (Official Charts)	34

Chart (2021)	Peak position
UK Rock & Metal Albums (Official Charts)	20

=== Year-end charts ===
Chart (1971)	Position
Dutch Albums (Album Top 100)	39
German Albums (Offizielle Top 100)	24

== Certifications ==
Region	Certification	Certified units/sales
Canada (Music Canada)	Gold	50,000^{^}
United Kingdom (BPI)	Gold	100,000^{^}
United States (RIAA)	Gold	500,000^{^}
^{^} Shipments figures based on certification alone.
