= Black Moon (album) =

Studio album by Emerson, Lake & Palmer
- Released: 18 May 1992
- Studios: Marcus Studios; Front Page Recorders
- Genres: Progressive rock, synth-pop
- Length: 48:28
- Label: Victory Music
- Producers: Mark Mancina; Ian Morrow; John Van Tongeren

Emerson, Lake & Palmer chronology
The Best of Emerson, Lake & Palmer (1980)	Black Moon (1992)	Live at the Royal Albert Hall (1993)

Singles from Black Moon
- 1. "Black Moon" Released: 11 May 1992; 2. "Affairs of the Heart" Released: 9 November 1992

Black Moon is the eighth studio album, and the first in fourteen years, by English progressive rock band Emerson, Lake & Palmer, released in May 1992. The band had broken up in 1979, and recorded Black Moon to kick off their 1990s revival.

== Production ==
The track "Affairs of the Heart" originated in summer 1988 sessions by Lake with Geoff Downes under the project name Ride the Tiger. The Emerson, Lake & Palmer version is more guitar-oriented and includes a bridge not present on the original version. Another song from the sessions, "Money Talks", became "Paper Blood" with a different chorus and new music. Ride the Tiger was finally released in 2015.

== Reception ==
Professional ratings
Review scores
Source	Rating
AllMusic	2/5 stars
Classic Rock	2/5 stars
Entertainment Weekly	C
MusicHound Rock	2.5/5 stars
Q	3/5 stars

Black Moon received mixed reviews. Jim Allen of AllMusic wrote in a retrospective review that the performers "stripped down their sound and amped up their attack." In his book The Music's All that Matters: A History of Progressive Rock, Paul Stump compared it favorably to its contemporary Union (by fellow progressive rock giants Yes). He explained that Black Moon "did at least aspire to interest and excite the listener, and it would be a churlish mind that overlooked a vigour in the playing which had formerly been notable by its absence. The material, though, suffered from the Yes malaise: cynicism and over-exposure to the wallet-fattening blandishments of easy-out FM mores, intervals and development procedures had blunted edges and dulled nerve-endings both of players and listeners."

Half of the album's songs were played at the band's 1992-1993 concerts. Greg Lake included the songs "Paper Blood", "Farewell to Arms" and "Footprints in the Snow" in the setlist of his 2005 solo tour. "Farewell to Arms" was played at the group's final concert, at the High Voltage Festival in July 2010.

== Track listing ==
No.	Title	Length
1.	"Black Moon" (Keith Emerson, Greg Lake, Carl Palmer)	6:56
2.	"Paper Blood" (Emerson, Lake, Palmer)	4:26
3.	"Affairs of the Heart" (Geoff Downes, Lake)	3:46
4.	"Romeo and Juliet" (Sergei Prokofiev, "Dance of the Knights" from the ballet Romeo and Juliet, Op. 64)	3:43
5.	"Farewell to Arms" (Emerson, Lake)	5:08
6.	"Changing States" (Emerson)	6:02
7.	"Burning Bridges" (Mark Mancina)	4:41
8.	"Close to Home" (Emerson)	4:33
9.	"Better Days" (Emerson, Lake)	5:33
10.	"Footprints in the Snow" (Lake)	3:50

Victor and 2008 Shout! Factory Bonus Track
No.	Title	Length
11.	"A Blade of Grass" (Emerson)	2:15

Sanctuary and Sony Bonus Tracks
No.	Title	Length
11.	"Black Moon" (Single edit)	4:48
12.	"Affairs of the Heart" (Edited version)	2:20
13.	"Paper Blood" (Edited version)	1:34
14.	"Romeo and Juliet" (Edited version)	1:33

2017 Deluxe Edition

2017 Deluxe Edition - CD one - Original 1992 album - 2017 remaster - plus bonus
No.	Title	Writer(s)	Length
1.	"Black Moon"	Keith Emerson, Greg Lake, Carl Palmer	6:56
2.	"Paper Blood"	Emerson, Lake, Palmer	4:26
3.	"Affairs of the Heart"	Geoff Downes, Lake	3:46
4.	"Romeo and Juliet"	Sergei Prokofiev, "Dance of the Knights" from the eponymous ballet, Op. 64	3:43
5.	"Farewell to Arms"	Emerson, Lake	5:08
6.	"Changing States"	Emerson	6:02
7.	"Burning Bridges"	Mark Mancina	4:41
8.	"Close to Home"	Emerson	4:33
9.	"Better Days"	Emerson, Lake	5:33
10.	"Footprints in the Snow"	Lake	3:50
11.	"Black Moon" (Bonus track - single edit)	Emerson, Lake, Palmer
12.	"Affairs of the Heart" (Bonus track - edit)	Downes, Lake
13.	"Paper Blood" (Bonus track - edit)	Emerson, Lake, Palmer
14.	"Romeo and Juliet" (Bonus track - edit)	Prokofiev

2017 Deluxe Edition - CD two - Live at the Royal Albert Hall - 2017 remaster
No.	Title	Length
1.	"Karn Evil 9, 1st Impression, Part 2"
2.	"Tarkus": "Eruption"; "Stones of Years"; "Iconoclast"
3.	"Knife Edge"
4.	"Paper Blood"
5.	"Romeo And Juliet"
6.	"Creole Dance"
7.	"Still... You Turn Me On"
8.	"Lucky Man"
9.	"Black Moon"
10.	"Pirates"
11.	"Finale": "Fanfare for the Common Man"; "America"; "Rondo"

== Personnel ==
- Keith Emerson - GOFF Professional MIDI Hammond C-3, Yamaha GX-1, Steinway Grand Piano, Modular Moog, Minimoog
- Greg Lake - vocals, guitars, bass, harmonica (on "Paper Blood")
- Carl Palmer - drums, percussion

== Production ==
- Producer: Mark Mancina
- Engineers: Steve Kempster, Stephen Marcussen, David Mitchell
- Assistant engineers: Anthony Danbury, Gil Morales, Marnie Riley, Brett Swain, Charlie Watts
- Mixing: Steve Kempster, David Mitchell
- Mastering: Stephen Marcussen
- Digital editing: Jay Rifkin
- Programming: Tim Heintz, Gary Hodgson, Ian Morrow, John Van Tongeren
- Keyboard technician: Will Alexander
- Hammond Organ technician: Al Goff, GOFF Professional
- Vocal arrangement: Mark Holding
- album cover artwork: Awest

== Charts ==
Chart (1992)	Peak position
Canada Top Albums/CDs (RPM)	66
Dutch Albums (Album Top 100)	77
German Albums (Offizielle Top 100)	45
Hungarian Albums (MAHASZ)	40
Japanese Albums (Oricon)	16
Swiss Albums (Schweizer Hitparade)	23
US Billboard 200	78

== Singles ==
- Black Moon [Single Version] / A Blade Of Grass / Black Moon [Album Version]
- Affairs Of The Heart / Better Days / A Blade Of Grass / Black Moon [Radio Version]
- Affairs Of The Heart / Black Moon [Radio Version] / Fanfare For The Common Man [special edit] / Jerusalem
