= Eddy Offord =

British record producer

Edward Offord is an English retired record producer and audio engineer who gained prominence in the 1970s for his work on albums by the progressive rock bands Emerson, Lake & Palmer and Yes.

== Life and career ==
Offord studied physics at university, and landed a job as a trainee engineer at Advision Studios in London to fill in spare time. Not long into his time at the studio, he started work as an engineer. Offord spent much of his career working at Advision Studios, and his early projects there included two 1969 albums by Brian Auger and the Trinity, Definitely What! and Streetnoise. In the same year, he was also credited as an engineer in the debut album Extrapolation by John McLaughlin.

Offord worked with Emerson, Lake & Palmer (ELP) on their first four albums, released between 1970 and 1972. ELP wrote a tribute to Offord with the song "Are You Ready, Eddy?", featured on their 1971 album Tarkus.

In 1970, Offord began his partnership with Yes, which was fruitful but tumultuous; Offord remarked that producing Yes was like "trying to produce five producers." He suggested that the band record Tales from Topographic Oceans (1973) in the countryside to try to ease tensions that had arisen within the group, but the compromise was to record at Morgan Studios with trees, plants, and model cows. Following Relayer (1974), Yes and Offord parted ways, with Yes guitarist Steve Howe stating that Offord had become unreliable on tours.

In the late 1970s, Offord relocated to the United States where he worked in Woodstock, Atlanta, and Los Angeles. In 1994, after working on Grassroots by the band 311, Offord announced his retirement from the music business, although he returned in 2011 when his stepson introduced him to The Midnight Moan, and went on to produce their debut album.

== Some albums produced and/or engineered by Eddy Offord ==
- Albums with APOSTLES (produced mixed engineered).
  - APOSTLES, (CD) Self titled (1992)
- Albums with Julie Driscoll, Brian Auger and the Trinity (as engineer)
  - Open (1968)
  - Streetnoise (1969)
- Albums with Brian Auger and the Trinity (as engineer)
  - Definitely What! (1969)
- Albums with Emerson, Lake & Palmer (as engineer)
  - Emerson, Lake & Palmer (1970)
  - Tarkus (1971)
  - Pictures at an Exhibition (1971)
  - Trilogy (1972)
- Albums with Heads Hands and Feet
  - Heads Hands and Feet (1971) (engineer)
  - Tracks (1972) (engineer)
- Albums with Taste and Rory Gallagher
  - Taste (1969) (engineer)
  - On the Boards (1970) (engineer)
  - Rory Gallagher (1971) (engineer)
- Albums with Yes (as co-producer and engineer except where noted)
  - Time and a Word (1970) (engineer only)
  - The Yes Album (1971)
  - Fragile (1971)
  - Close to the Edge (1972)
  - Yessongs (1973)
  - Tales from Topographic Oceans (1973)
  - Relayer (1974)
  - Drama (1980) (co-producer only)
  - Union (1991) (two tracks only)
- Albums with Baker Gurvitz Army
  - Hearts on Fire (1976)
- Album with David Sancious & Tone (as co-producer and engineer)
  - True Stories (1978)
  - Just As I Thought (1979)
- Album with Rozetta Stone 1979 co-produced Philippe Saisse
  - Where's My Hero 1980
    - Guitars courtesy Polydor Records *Bruce Kulick (Blackjack)
- Album with Blackjack
  - Worlds Apart (1980)
- Album with Andy Pratt
  - Motives (1979)
- Album with Dixie Dregs (co-producer with Steve Morse)
  - Industry Standard (under the name The Dregs) (1982)
- Albums with Pallas
  - The Sentinel (1984)
- Album with Art in America
  - Art in America (Sony/Pavilion 1983)
- Album with Jay Aaron (as co-engineer & co-producer with Jay Aaron)
  - Jay Aaron Inside/Out (Warner Bros. 1990)
- Albums with 311
  - Music (1993)
  - Grassroots (1994)
- Albums with Opus (as producer)
  - Opus (1987)
- Album with National Head Band
  - Albert 1 (1971)
- Album with Tinsley Ellis
  - Storm Warning (1994)
  - Hell or High Water (2002)
- Albums with Utopia (engineer on 2 cuts)
  - Ra (1977)
