= William Neal =

English painter

William Neal (born 1947) is an English artist painter and graphic designer who achieved international recognition after working for the progressive rock band Emerson, Lake & Palmer. During the last 10 years, and alongside his watercolour work, William has produced a series of large abstract paintings complemented by musical compositions written specially for the works by himself and other collaborators. Successful shows featuring these series of paintings were held in the Gracefield Arts Centre in Dumfries in 2007, and the Mill on the Fleet in Gatehouse of Fleet in 2009.

== Biography ==
Born in Guildford in 1947, Neal was brought up in the village of Bramley, Surrey. He gained a diploma in art and design at the Guildford School of Art (now the University for the Creative Arts), graduating in 1967. Following a diverse career in the graphic arts, he worked for the BBC, Pitman Publishing and C.C.S. Associates, a leading design group in London’s West End. It was from C.C.S. that he met Greg Lake and went on to work for Emerson, Lake & Palmer, producing cover designs for the two million-selling albums Tarkus and Pictures at an Exhibition. The original paintings were hung at Hammersmith Town Hall, and photographed by the late Keith Morris, a former graduate with Neal from the Guildford Art school. His work was also used by other rock bands such as Stone the Crows, Audience, The Mick Abrahams Band, the Upsetters and numerous reggae bands for Trojan Records.

From 1971, he concentrated on painting full-time, holding many exhibitions until he met Stefan Knapp in 1978. This proved to be a significant turning point in his career, becoming Stefan’s studio assistant and close friend. Stefan’s influence as an internationally famous enamellist and painter and his kindly direction and encouragement laid the basis for all of Neal’s work up to the present.

Although Neal's work differs from Stefan’s work, both artists share an emphasis on studio discipline and gradual colour transitions, which developed through their collaboration. Today he works from his studio near Stranraer in south-west Scotland. Themes of peace, colour and harmony are present in all of his paintings, many of which depict in watercolour, his specialist subject of the Galloway landscape by moonlight. His paintings continue to be recognizable to collectors of his work, and over 5,000 limited-edition prints have been sold to date.

In 2012, over 40 years since last working with Keith Emerson, Neal's watercolour painting "Moonlit Dunes" was used for the cover of Keith's latest CD "Three Fates Project" with Marc Bonilla, Terje Mikkelsen, The Keith Emerson Band and the Munchner Rundfunkorchester.
