= In the Hot Seat =

Studio album by Emerson, Lake & Palmer
- Released: 26 September 1994
- Studio: Goodnight L.A. Studios, Los Angeles, California
- Genre: Progressive rock, pop rock, synth-pop
- Length: 46:05
- Label: Victory
- Producer: Keith Olsen

Emerson, Lake & Palmer chronology
The Return of the Manticore (1993)	In the Hot Seat (1994)	King Biscuit Flower Hour: Greatest Hits Live (1997)

In the Hot Seat is the ninth and final studio album by English progressive rock band Emerson, Lake & Palmer, released on 26 September 1994 by Victory. Recorded at Goodnight L.A. Studios in Los Angeles, it was produced by Keith Olsen.

== Production ==
The making of the album was complicated by health issues encountered by both keyboard player Keith Emerson and drummer Carl Palmer. Emerson had trouble with the ulnar nerve, which made it difficult for him to control his right hand. As the prognosis for recovery after the surgical treatment was not promising, he had to overdub the right-hand parts with his left hand. Palmer suffered problems with carpal tunnel syndrome, which led to numbness in his fingers. He underwent surgery to correct the issue.

"Daddy" was written by Lake in memory of missing child Sara Anne Wood and was used to raise awareness of missing and abducted children. The royalties from the song initially brought in $5,000 and were donated to the Sara Anne Wood Rescue Center, a national non-profit foundation established by Wood's father.

"Street War" originated in summer 1988 sessions by Lake with Geoff Downes under the project name Ride the Tiger, but was reworked for this album by adding and rewriting lyrics and composing new music. Ride the Tiger was finally released in 2015.

== Reception ==
Professional ratings
Review scores
Source	Rating
AllMusic	1.5/5 stars

The album was a commercial flop. It received very little airplay and was the only Emerson, Lake & Palmer studio recording not to chart on the US Billboard 200. In the Hot Seat is their poorest-selling album. Marc Loren of AllMusic retrospectively rated In the Hot Seat 1.5 out of 5 stars, saying it "falls short on so many levels that not even the talents of three phenomenal musicians can save it," and named "Hand of Truth" and "Daddy" as among the few highlights. Keith Olsen later regretted having produced the album, saying it had "No songs, no preparation, no work ethic," while Carl Palmer described the album as "dreadful".

== Track listing ==
No.	Title	Writer(s)	Length
1.	"Hand of Truth"	Keith Emerson, Greg Lake	5:23
2.	"Daddy"	Lake	4:42
3.	"One by One"	Emerson, Lake, Keith Olsen	5:08
4.	"Heart on Ice"	Lake, Olsen	4:20
5.	"Thin Line"	Bill Wray, Olsen, Emerson	4:46
6.	"Man in the Long Black Coat"	Bob Dylan (arrangement: Emerson)	4:12
7.	"Change"	Wray, Emerson, Olsen	4:44
8.	"Give Me a Reason to Stay"	Steve Diamond, Sam Lorber	4:14
9.	"Gone Too Soon"	Lake, Wray, Keith Wechsler	4:12
10.	"Street War"	Emerson, Lake	4:24
Total length:			46:05

Bonus tracks
No.	Title	Writer(s)	Length
11.	"Pictures at an Exhibition" (Studio Version) a. "Promenade" b. "The Gnome" c. "Promenade" d. "The Sage" e. "The Hut of Baba Yaga" f. "The Great Gates of Kiev"	Modest Mussorgsky, Lake (arrangement: Emerson, Carl Palmer; lyrics: Lake); Mussorgsky (arrangement: Emerson); Mussorgsky (arrangement: Palmer); Mussorgsky (lyrics: Lake); Lake; Mussorgsky (arrangement: Emerson); Mussorgsky (arrangement: Emerson; lyrics: Lake)	15:29 (1:45) (2:07) (1:45) (3:10) (1:15) (5:23)
12.	"Hammer It Out"	Emerson	2:36
Total length:			64:10

2017 Deluxe Edition

2017 Deluxe Edition - CD one - Original 1994 album - 2017 remaster - plus bonuses
No.	Title	Writer(s)	Length
1.	"Hand of Truth"	Keith Emerson, Greg Lake	5:23
2.	"Daddy"	Lake	4:42
3.	"One by One"	Emerson, Lake, Keith Olsen	5:08
4.	"Heart on Ice"	Lake, Olsen	4:20
5.	"Thin Line"	Bill Wray, Olsen, Emerson	4:46
6.	"Man in the Long Black Coat"	Bob Dylan (arrangement: Emerson)	4:12
7.	"Change"	Wray, Emerson, Olsen	4:44
8.	"Give Me a Reason to Stay"	Steve Diamond, Sam Lorber	4:14
9.	"Gone Too Soon"	Lake, Wray, Keith Wechsler	4:12
10.	"Street War"	Emerson, Lake	4:24
11.	"Pictures at an Exhibition" a. "Promenade" b. "The Gnome" c. "Promenade" d. "The Sage" e. "The Hut of Baba Yaga" f. "The Great Gates of Kiev"	Modest Mussorgsky, Lake (arrangement: Emerson, Carl Palmer; lyrics: Lake); Mussorgsky (arrangement: Emerson); Mussorgsky (arrangement: Palmer); Mussorgsky (lyrics: Lake); Lake; Mussorgsky (arrangement: Emerson); Mussorgsky (arrangement: Emerson; lyrics: Lake)	15:29 (1:45) (2:07) (1:45) (3:10) (1:15) (5:23)
12.	"A Time and a Place" (Bonus track - Now Tour '97 / '98 (2017 Remaster))	Emerson, Lake, Palmer
13.	"Piano Concerto No. 1: Third Movement: Toccata Con Fuogo" (Bonus track - Now Tour '97 / '98 (2017 Remaster))	Emerson

2017 Deluxe Edition - CD two - Now Tour '97 / '98 - 2017 remaster
No.	Title	Writer(s)	Length
1.	"From The Beginning"	Lake
2.	"Karn Evil 9: 1st Impression Part 2"	Emerson, Lake
3.	"Tiger In A Spotlight"	Emerson, Lake, Palmer, Sinfield
4.	"Hoedown"	Copeland (arrangement: Emerson, Lake, Palmer)
5.	"Touch And Go"	Emerson, Lake
6.	"Knife Edge"	Leoš Janáček, J.S. Bach, Fraser (arrangement: Emerson, Lake, Palmer)
7.	"Bitches Crystal"	Emerson, Lake
8.	"Honky Tonk Train Blues"	Meade Lux Lewis
9.	"Take A Pebble"	Lake
10.	"Lucky Man"	Lake
11.	"Fanfare For The Common Man / Rondo"	Copeland / Brubeck (arrangement: by Emerson, Lake, Palmer)
12.	"21st Century Schizoid Man / America"	Fripp, Giles, Lake, McDonald, Sinfield / Bernstein, Sondheim

== Personnel ==
Emerson, Lake & Palmer

- Keith Emerson – keyboards, keyboard programming
- Greg Lake – vocals, guitar, bass
- Carl Palmer – drums

Additional personnel

- Bill Wray – backing vocals (on "Thin Line")
- Paula Mattioli – backing vocals (on "Thin Line")
- Kristen Olsen – additional vocals (on "Daddy")
- Tim Pierce – additional guitars
- Richard Baker – additional keyboard programming
- Brian Foraker – additional keyboard programming
- Keith Wechsler – drum programming, additional keyboard programming

Choir (on "Pictures at an Exhibition")

- Fred White
- Ricky Nelson
- Lynn B. Davis
- Linda McCrary

Technical personnel

- Keith Olsen – production, engineering
- Brian Foraker – engineering
- Joe Gastwirt – mastering engineer (at Ocean View Digital Mastering, Los Angeles)
- Hans Neleman – cover photography
- Karl Kristkeitz – package design
- Brian Aris – band photography

== Charts ==
Chart (1994)	Peak position
Japanese Albums (Oricon)	60
