= Tarkus (suite) =

Song by Emerson, Lake & Palmer

from the album Tarkus
- Released: June 14, 1971 (UK); August, 1971 (US)
- Recorded: January 1971, Advision Studios
- Genre: Progressive rock
- Length: 20:42
- Label: Island
- Songwriters: Keith Emerson, Greg Lake
- Producer: Greg Lake

"Tarkus" is the title track of Emerson, Lake & Palmer's second album. The progressive rock epic lasts 20:42. It was the longest studio suite by the band until the three impressions of "Karn Evil 9". The name "Tarkus" refers to the armadillo-tank from the William Neal paintings on the album cover. The artist has explained that the name is an amalgamation between 'Tartarus' and 'carcass' (hence the name being written in bones on the album cover). Consequently, the name refers to the "futility of war, a man made mess with symbols of mutated destruction." The song "Tarkus" is said to follow the adventures of Tarkus from his birth, through a fight with a manticore, which he loses and concludes with an aquatic version of Tarkus named "Aquatarkus". Keith Emerson, when asked what work he is proudest of, named his "Piano Concerto" (from the Works release) and "Tarkus".

== Movements ==
"Tarkus" itself is broken down into seven parts (timings reflect the beginning cues for each section):

1. "Eruption" (instrumental) – 0:00
2. "Stones of Years" – 2:43
3. "Iconoclast" (instrumental) – 6:27
4. "Mass" – 7:43
5. "Manticore" (instrumental) – 10:55
6. "Battlefield" – 12:47
7. "Aquatarkus" (instrumental) – 16:39.

All the music except 'Battlefield' (written by Lake) is written by Emerson. All the lyrics are written by Lake.

== Lyrics ==
A visual representation of the story, as seen on the inner gatefold of the LP

The parts supposedly follow Tarkus' birth in a volcanic eruption centuries before known history (around the Eocene). The exact nature of Tarkus' origin and actions are unknown, and left ambiguous by its creator, Keith Emerson. "Eruption" itself presents a musical impression of cascading eruption on the keyboards in a 10/8 time signature, backed by Carl Palmer on drums. This segues into the "Stones of Years", the first of three vocal sections.

The second, third, fourth and fifth are supposedly the movements that represent the enemies he meets:

- The interlude of the aforementioned "Stones of Years", the second movement, represents the travel of Tarkus and the enemy he meets first. The "Stones of Years" are thought to resemble a mixture of a "stone" version of a cybernetic spider-like creature with spikes like a stegosaurus; a shield embedded in its side; two antennae, each with its own set of eyes; and what looks like a set of two poison gas tanks on the back, sort of resembling a futuristic station. As the interlude is reaching its end, the enemy is overpowered and then finished off by Tarkus' turrets before the song returns to vocal.
- "Iconoclast" is the third movement and the movement which represents the enemy Tarkus meets second. The "Iconoclast", according to the inner gatefold, is a mixture of a pterodactyl and a war airplane, and is rapidly overpowered by guitar for "Mass".
- "Mass" is the name of Tarkus' third enemy and the fourth movement, which is filled with numerous religious references; it often had its lyrics dropped in tours by the Keith Emerson Band, as does Stones of Years. The "Mass" is often thought to be a mixture of a lizard, grasshopper and a rocket launcher.
- This is followed by "Manticore" in which the final enemy of Tarkus appears and a battle ensues between variations on the "Tarkus" theme and the Manticore's. Ultimately, Tarkus is defeated and "Battlefield" follows.
- The movement "Battlefield" is the only part written entirely by Greg Lake.
- "Aquatarkus" closes the track, centering mostly on a march based on the "Battlefield" theme and then returning to the original "Eruption" theme as a farewell to Tarkus and a greeting to the aquatic Aquatarkus.

== Production ==
According to Emerson, while Palmer was excited by some of the technical opportunities the song would present, Lake was not quite so enamoured, telling Emerson "If you want to play that sort of stuff, I suggest you play it on your solo album." The band almost broke up over the issue, Emerson telling Lake "Take it or leave it." The managers convinced Lake to stay and record the piece. Lake stated in an interview after the release: "It's about the futility of conflict expressed in [the] context [...] of soldiers and war. But it's broader than that. The words are about revolution that's gone, that has happened. Where has it got anybody? Nowhere." He has said "Stones of Years" is one of his favourite parts of "Tarkus". Lake admits to not being entirely sure of what it means, but says it is about, "listening, understanding, hearing." When asked how "Tarkus" could be written so quickly (six days), Emerson said:

Our sort of creativity comes in varying periods. We get long periods when there isn't any creativity, we go into a studio and nothing sounds right, you know. Tarkus was written in six days because there was an awful lot of inspiration and one idea triggered another idea, and it was a long series of ideas being triggered off of what we had already done.

Musically, the arrangement of the piece revolves primarily around Keith's Hammond organ, with extensive overdubs of piano and Moog synthesizer. "Stones of Years" and "Mass" feature Hammond solos with "Mass" also featuring a clavinet-sounding Moog part, while "Aquatarkus" revolves around an extended "underwater" Moog solo over a martial rhythm (this final section would be greatly expanded on stage with the continued development of synth technology, as heard on 1974's live Welcome Back My Friends...). Lake plays bass on every section, adds electric guitar to "Mass" and both acoustic and electric guitars to "Battlefield" including two lengthy, simultaneous electric solos. When played live, the piano overdubs throughout and electric guitar additions on "Mass" were dropped, replaced on the latter by Emerson playing with the ribbon controller on his Moog. Lake, however, extended the guitar showcase on "Battlefield" by adding an excerpt from King Crimson's "Epitaph".

== Reception ==
The song, described by one journalist to be "about a post-apocalyptic, metal-plated, bionic armadillo outfitted with enough weaponry to wage perpetual solo warfare," remains a fan favourite and was consistently played at ELP, Keith Emerson Band and Carl Palmer band concerts.

"Stones of Years" was used as a single. It failed to chart.

Paul Stump, in his 1997 book The Music's All that Matters: A History of Progressive Rock, said the song "gets into its stride with a speedy, dissonant, syncopated keyboard-led theme over which further riffs, ideas and countermelodies are layered."

Cash Box said of the "Stone of Years" section that "eerie vocals and stunning organ/percussion interplay makes for exceptional outing."

== Other recordings ==
Emerson, Lake & Palmer played a 27-minute version of "Tarkus" on Welcome Back, My Friends, to the Show That Never Ends... Ladies and Gentlemen, Emerson, Lake & Palmer. A brief sample of King Crimson's "Epitaph" ("Confusion will be my epitaph, as I crawl a cracked and broken path, if we make it we can all sit back and laugh...") appears as a coda to Battlefield, followed by Aquatarkus and an extended solo by Emerson.

In 2004, the Japanese classical pianist Aki Kuroda released an album with a classical adaptation of "Tarkus".

In 2007, Dream Theater keyboardist Jordan Rudess included a cover of this song in his solo album The Road Home, which consists mostly of covers of classic progressive rock songs.

Emerson recorded a new instrumental version with Marc Bonilla, Terje Mikkelsen and the Munich Radio Orchestra, which appears on their 2012 album Three Fates under the title Tarkus – Concertante.

== Personnel ==
- Keith Emerson: Hammond organ, grand piano, Moog modular synthesizer, celesta
- Greg Lake: vocals, bass guitar, electric guitar, acoustic guitar
- Carl Palmer: drums, percussion

== See also ==
- Quintuple meter
