= Emerson, Lake & Palmer =

English progressive rock band

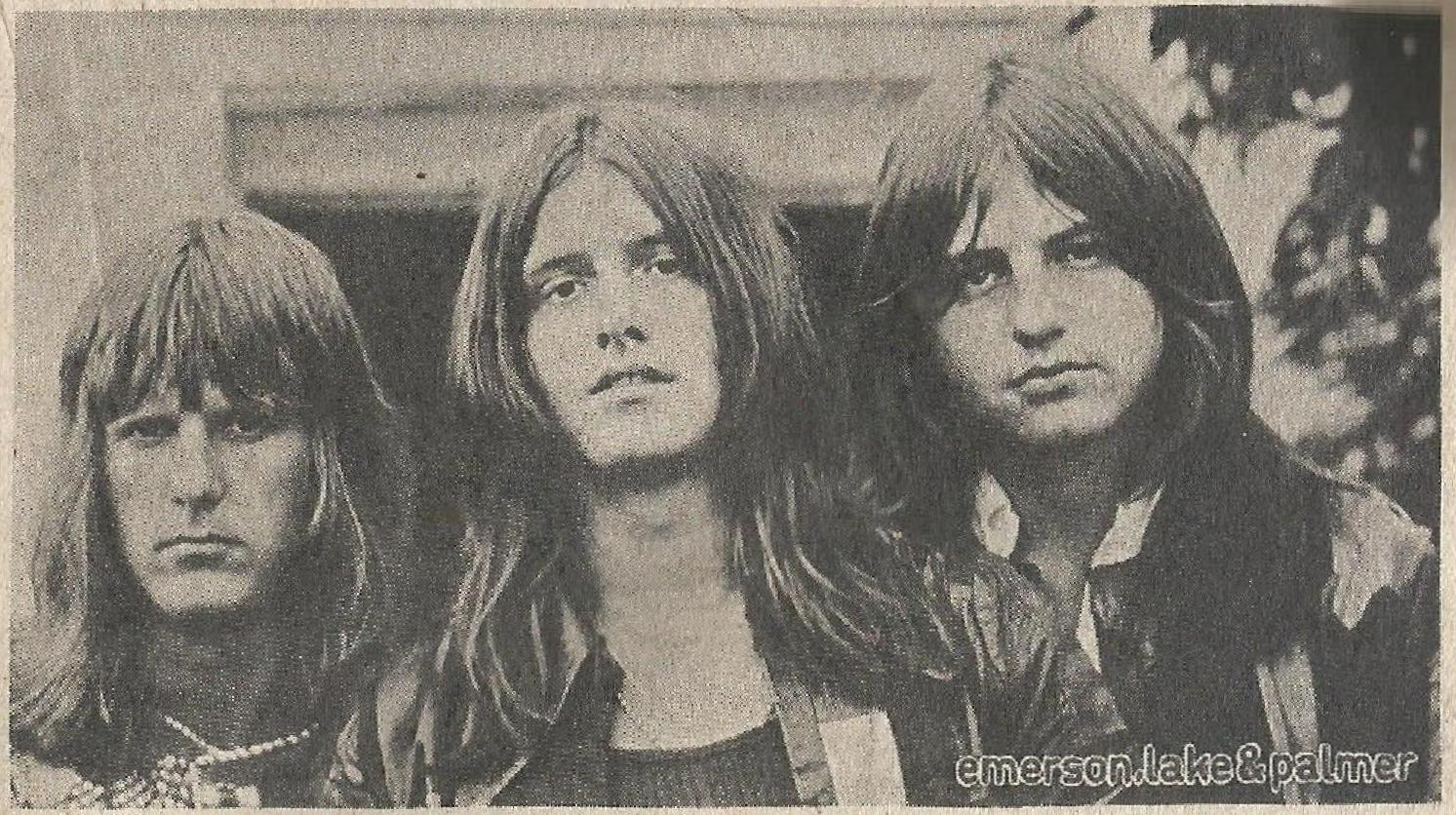
- The band in 1972 (from left to right: Emerson, Palmer, and Lake)

Background information
- Also known as: ELP
- Origin: London, England
- Genres: Progressive rock; art rock
- Years active: 1970–1979; 1990–1999; 2010
- Labels: Island; Atlantic; Cotillion; Atco; Manticore; Sanctuary; Rhino; Shout! Factory; Victor; Sony; Razor & Tie; Mushroom; Virgin; Victory; Eagle; VJR; E.G.; IOM; CAR
- Spinoffs: Asia; Emerson, Lake & Powell; 3
- Spinoff of: Atomic Rooster; King Crimson; the Nice
- Past members: Keith Emerson; Greg Lake; Carl Palmer
- Website: emersonlakepalmer.com

Emerson, Lake & Palmer (informally known as ELP) were an English progressive rock supergroup formed in London in 1970. The band consisted of Keith Emerson (keyboards) of the Nice, Greg Lake (vocals, bass, guitars, producer) of King Crimson, and Carl Palmer (drums, percussion) of Atomic Rooster. With nine RIAA-certified gold record albums in the US, and an estimated 48 million records sold worldwide, they were one of the most popular and commercially successful progressive rock groups of the 1970s, with a musical sound including adaptations of classical music with jazz and symphonic rock elements, dominated by Emerson's flamboyant use of the Hammond organ, Moog synthesizer, and piano (although Lake wrote several acoustic songs for the group).

The band came to prominence following their performance at the Isle of Wight Festival in August 1970. In their first year, the group signed with E.G. Records (who distributed the band's records through Island Records in the United Kingdom, and Atlantic Records in North America), and released Emerson, Lake & Palmer (1970) and Tarkus (1971), both of which reached the UK top five. The band's success continued with Pictures at an Exhibition (1971), Trilogy (1972), and Brain Salad Surgery (1973, released on ELP's own Manticore Records label). After a three-year break, Emerson, Lake & Palmer released Works Volume 1 (1977) and Works Volume 2 (1977). After Love Beach (1978), the group disbanded in 1979.

The band re-formed partially in the 1980s as Emerson, Lake & Powell featuring Cozy Powell in place of Palmer, who was, by then, a member of Asia. Robert Berry then replaced Lake while Palmer returned, forming 3. In 1991, the original trio re-formed and released two more albums, Black Moon (1992) and In the Hot Seat (1994), and toured at various times between 1992 and 1998. Their final performance took place in 2010 at the High Voltage Festival in London to commemorate the band's 40th anniversary. Both Emerson and Lake died in 2016, leaving Palmer as the only surviving member of the band.

Stylistically, the band was known for "[combining] heavy riffs with classical influences." Bruce Eder of AllMusic wrote, "Their flamboyance on record and in the studio echoed the best work of the heavy metal bands of the era, proving that classical rockers could compete for that arena-scale audience."

== History ==
=== 1969–1970: Formation and first gigs ===
By the end of 1969, the Nice keyboardist Keith Emerson and King Crimson bassist/vocalist Greg Lake were looking to leave their respective groups and form a new band. The pair first met in New York City and discussed the possibility of forming one together; they met again in December 1969 when the Nice and King Crimson were billed together for concerts at the Fillmore West in San Francisco. During a soundcheck before one of the shows, Emerson described the first time he and Lake played together: "Greg was moving a bass line and I played the piano in back and Zap! It was there." When the Nice split in March 1970 and Lake left King Crimson a month later, the pair began the search for a drummer, which turned out to be a difficult process. They initially approached Mitch Mitchell, who was at a loose end following the break-up of the Jimi Hendrix Experience and suggested a jam session take place among the three of them and guitarist Jimi Hendrix. The session never happened, but it led to the press later reporting rumours of a planned supergroup named HELP, an acronym for "Hendrix Emerson Lake Palmer", which Lake later debunked. As part of auditions for drummers at a studio by Soho Square, Emerson's manager, Tony Stratton Smith, suggested Carl Palmer of Atomic Rooster and previously the Crazy World of Arthur Brown. Palmer turned up for a session and enjoyed the chemistry, but was reluctant to commit as Atomic Rooster were starting to gain attention in Europe. Emerson and Lake persisted, and after several weeks, Palmer agreed to join.

The three named themselves Emerson, Lake & Palmer to remove the focus on Emerson as the most famous of the three, and to ensure that they were not called the "new Nice". Triton was a name that Emerson said "was buzzing around" for a little while, and Triumvirate and Seahorse were also in contention. They moved to Island Studios in Notting Hill to rehearse and form a live set. Most of the numbers were rock adaptations and arrangements of classical pieces, including: Allegro barbaro by Béla Bartók entitled "The Barbarian", the jazz standard "Blue Rondo à la Turk" by Dave Brubeck entitled "Rondo" that Emerson had recorded with the Nice, "Nut Rocker" as an encore, and Pictures at an Exhibition by Modest Mussorgsky that Emerson wanted to do after seeing it performed by an orchestra. An original song from Lake, "Take a Pebble", was also worked out. The group wished to enhance their live act, and spent £9,000 on a sound mixer and £4,000 on a Moog modular synthesizer imported from America that was adapted for better performance on stage.

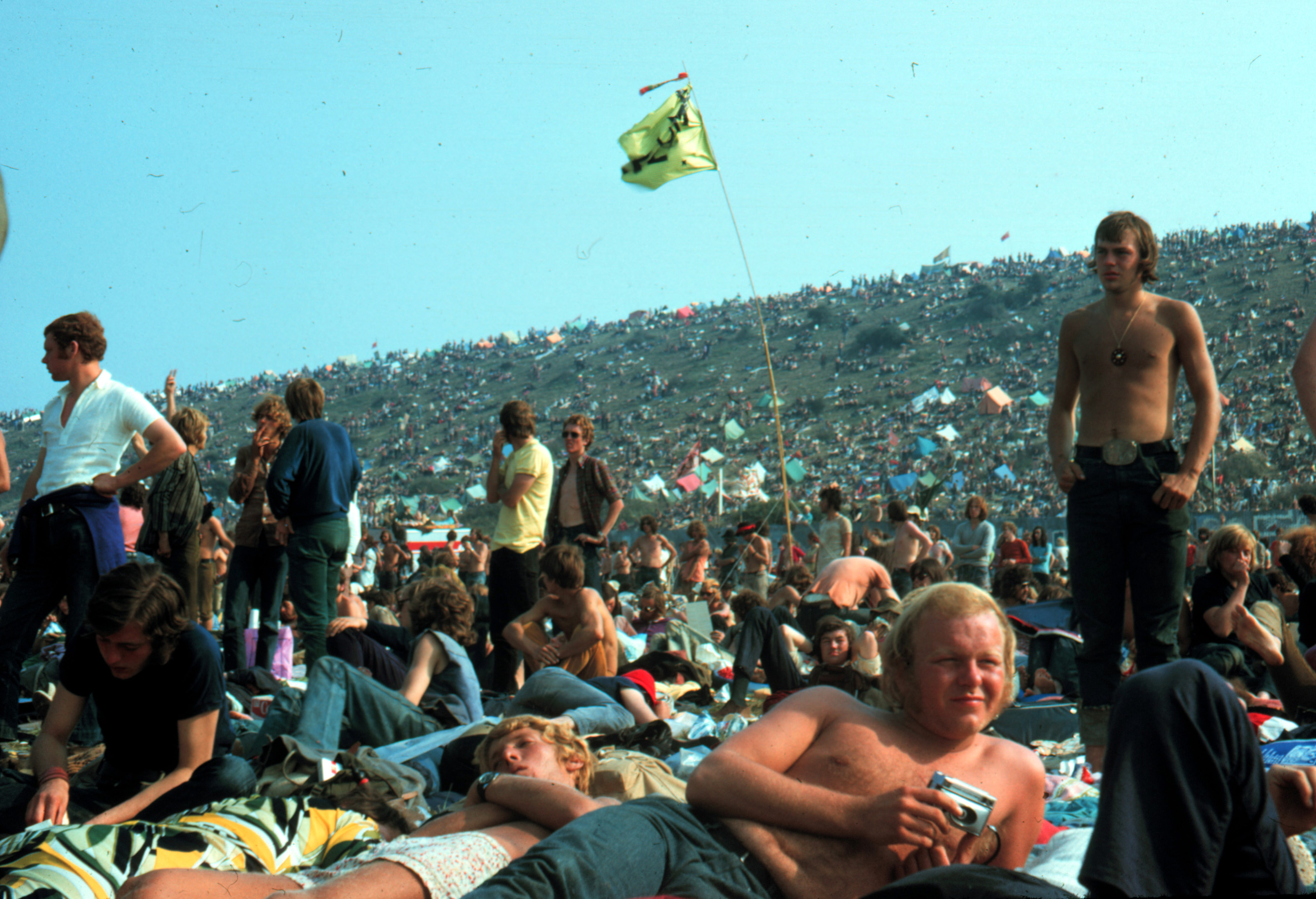
The group's second gig was at the 1970 Isle of Wight Festival

The trio's first live gig followed at Plymouth Guildhall on 23 August 1970, supported by Earth, a local band. They travelled to the venue in a transit van previously owned by fellow progressive rock band Yes, and were paid around £400 for the gig. A small venue outside London was deliberately chosen in case the concert was a failure, but the concert was well received. Their second gig took place on 29 August with a set at the Isle of Wight Festival which was attended by an estimated 600,000 people and drew considerable attention from the public and music press. At the end of "Pictures at an Exhibition", the band fired two cannons that Emerson had tested in a field near Heathrow Airport.

The success of the group's debut, as well as Lake's prior association with King Crimson, led to the band signing management and recording contracts with E.G. Records, who distributed their records through Island in the UK and Cotillion, a subsidiary of Atlantic Records, in North America. Emerson believed that Atlantic's chief and co-founder Ahmet Ertegun agreed to take the band on "because we could sell out 20,000-seaters before we even had a record out. That was enough for him to think that a lot of people would go out and buy the record when it did come out."

=== 1970–1971: Debut album, Tarkus, and Pictures at an Exhibition ===
In the months surrounding their debut gigs, the band recorded their first album, Emerson Lake & Palmer, at Advision Studios. Lake took on the role of producer, which he had also done in King Crimson, with Eddy Offord as their engineer. The album included studio versions of "The Barbarian" and "Take a Pebble", "Knife-Edge", based on the first movement of Sinfonietta by Leoš Janáček and the Allemande of French Suite No. 1 in D minor by Johann Sebastian Bach, Palmer's drum solo "Tank", the three-part "The Three Fates", and "Lucky Man", an acoustic ballad that Lake wrote when he was twelve. The album was released in the UK in November 1970, and reached No. 4 in the UK and No. 18 in the US. "Lucky Man" was released as a single that peaked at No. 48 in the US.

From September 1970 to March 1971, the band completed their first concert tour with shows across the UK, Germany, Austria, and Switzerland. Emerson used a large Moog modular synthesizer on stage but it was unreliable as heat affected its sound. Their performance on 9 December 1970 at the Lyceum Theatre in London was filmed and released in UK theatres in 1972 with added psychedelic effects including characters from Marvel Comics.

During a break in their first tour in January 1971, Emerson, Lake & Palmer returned to Advision Studios with Offord to record their second album, Tarkus. Friction between Emerson and Lake during the early recording sessions almost caused the group to disband as Lake disliked the material that Emerson was writing. Following a meeting with the band and management, Lake agreed to write his own songs and continue recording. The album was recorded in six days. The album's first side is occupied by the 20-minute title track, a seven-part song based on reverse evolution that was recorded in four days. Its cover art was designed by painter and graphic designer William Neal. Tarkus was released in June 1971 and was a commercial success, reaching No. 1 in the UK and No. 9 in the US. The band resumed touring with their first North American tour, starting 24 April 1971 at Thiel College in Greenville, Pennsylvania, and continued until the end of May. Further dates across Europe followed until the end of the year.

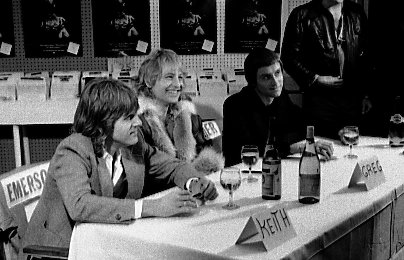
The band in 1978

The band's third album, Pictures at an Exhibition, was released as a budget album in the UK in November 1971. It features their version of the Mussorgsky suite performed live at Newcastle City Hall on 26 March 1971 plus the concert's encore, "Nut Rocker". It was to be released before Tarkus, but the group delayed its release on purpose to show the music press and public that they could write their own songs, and were not merely "the band that did classical music". Atlantic Records declined to release it in the US, claiming it would not sell or receive any radio airplay because of its classical orientation and offered to release it on its sister label Nonesuch Records which handled budget, classical, and avant-garde albums. The band refused until Island imported 250,000 copies into the US which quickly sold, helped by radio DJ Scott Muni playing the entire album on WNEW-FM in New York City. The strong response prompted Atlantic to release it through Cotillion at full price in January 1972. The album peaked at No. 3 in the UK and No. 10 in the US.

=== 1971–1974: Trilogy and Brain Salad Surgery ===
Trilogy, the band's third studio album, was recorded at Advision Studios with Offord between October 1971 and January 1972. Its cover art was designed by Storm Thorgerson and Aubrey Powell of Hipgnosis. "Hoedown" is an adaptation of Rodeo by Aaron Copland. Released in July 1972, Trilogy reached No. 2 in the UK and No. 5 in the US. "From the Beginning", an acoustic ballad featuring an extended synthesizer solo, was released as a single which reached No. 39 in the US. Lake has picked Trilogy as his favourite studio album by the band. The album was supported with a North American tour in March and April 1972 which included a spot at the Mar y Sol Pop Festival in Manatí, Puerto Rico on 3 April. Following dates across Europe, including their first in Italy, the band performed at the Concert 10 Festival at Pocono International Raceway in Long Pond, Pennsylvania, on 9 July 1972. This was followed by their first dates in Japan where a riot broke out during the show in Osaka, causing the power to be cut and the group fleeing the stage.

Band logo designed by H. R. Giger, introduced in 1973

In early 1973, the band formed their own record label, Manticore Records, and purchased an abandoned cinema as their own rehearsal hall in Fulham, London. In June 1973, Emerson, Lake & Palmer began recording Brain Salad Surgery in London at Advision and Olympic Studios which lasted until September that year. Offord was not present for the recording sessions as he was working with Yes, leaving engineering and mixing duties to Chris Kimsey and Geoff Young. Lake wrote the album's lyrics with Peter Sinfield and its sleeve was designed by H. R. Giger and includes the band's new logo. Formed of five tracks, the album includes a rendition of "Jerusalem" which features the debut of the Moog Apollo, a prototype polyphonic synthesizer. "Toccata" is a cover of the fourth movement of Piano Concerto No. 1 by Argentine composer Alberto Ginastera and contains synthesised percussion in the form of an acoustic drum kit fitted with pick-ups that triggered electronic sounds. The 29-minute track "Karn Evil 9" is the longest song recorded by the group. Brain Salad Surgery was released in November 1973 and reached No. 2 in the UK and No. 11 in the US.

From November 1973 to August 1974, the band toured North America and Europe which saw them carry almost 40 tons of equipment. On 6 April 1974, the band headlined the inaugural California Jam Festival at the Ontario Motor Speedway, California, to an attendance of 250,000 people. The show was filmed and broadcast across the US. These shows exhibited a mix of virtuoso musicianship and over-the-top performances which some criticised as excessive, such as Emerson playing a piano as it spun, suspended, end-over-end; Palmer playing on a rotating drum platform; and Emerson throwing a Hammond organ around the stage to create feedback. Emerson often used a knife, given to him by Lemmy Kilmister, who had roadied for the Nice, to force the keys on the organ to stay down. The tour was one of the top concert draws during the 1973–1974 period. Performances from Anaheim, California, were documented in the live album, Welcome Back, My Friends, to the Show That Never Ends ~ Ladies and Gentlemen, released in August 1974 as a triple LP. The album peaked at No. 5 in the UK and No. 4 in the US.

=== 1974–1978: Hiatus and Works ===
After touring in 1974, the band took an extended break. The three members bought homes overseas and became tax exiles in the process, but Emerson suffered a setback in 1975 when his Sussex home burned down and he lost most of his possessions. The ordeal left him depressed, and he later credited his bandmates in helping him recover from drug misuse.

They regrouped in 1976 to record Works Volume 1 at Mountain Studios in Montreux, Switzerland and EMI Studios in Paris, France. It is a double album with one side of an LP containing songs by each member and a fourth of group material. Much of the album was recorded with an orchestral accompaniment; Emerson's side consists of his 18-minute, three-movement "Piano Concerto No. 1". Lake contributed five songs he co-wrote with Sinfield, and Palmer's includes two covers of classical pieces by Sergei Prokofiev and Bach as well as an orchestral remake of "Tank" from the group's debut album. One of the two group tracks, "Fanfare for the Common Man", is a cover of the same-titled orchestral piece by Aaron Copland, who gave permission to have the band release it. Works Volume 1 was released in March 1977 and peaked at No. 9 in the UK and No. 12 in the US. A single of "Fanfare for the Common Man" was released and reached No. 2 in the UK, the band's highest charting UK single. In November 1977, Works Volume 2 was released as a compilation of shorter tracks recorded from 1973 to 1976 during various album recording sessions. The album was not as commercially successful as the band's previous albums; it reached No. 20 in the UK and No. 37 in the US. Three tracks from the album were released as singles: "Tiger in a Spotlight", "Maple Leaf Rag", and "Watching Over You".

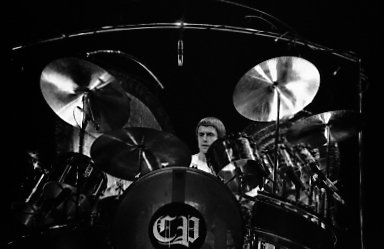
Palmer performing on the Works tour, in 1978

The two Works albums were supported by North American tours which lasted from May 1977 to February 1978, spanning over 120 dates. The original plan was to have an orchestra on stage with the band each night, but the idea was dropped after 11 shows due to the high costs and difficulties with the orchestra unions. The 64-piece orchestra and choir were formed from the 500 who auditioned for a position. The orchestra was used two other times on the tour: for three dates at Madison Square Garden in New York City and the August 1977 show at the Olympic Stadium in Montreal that was attended by an estimated 78,000 people, the highest attended Emerson, Lake & Palmer concert as a solo act. The concert was filmed and released as a live album in 1979 entitled Emerson, Lake & Palmer in Concert that reached No. 73 in the US. Emerson wished for a double album release, but Atlantic Records decided against it due to the band's pending dissolution at its time of release. In 1993, the album was repackaged with additional tracks as Works Live, and put out on video in 1998. Emerson later said that his insistence on the band using an orchestra was a mistake, but he was unwilling to tour without one. Lake looked back on this period as the beginning of the end of the group's original run.

=== 1978–1979: Love Beach and first break-up ===
After their 1977–78 tour, the band discussed their next move. Emerson recalled that in order for the group to continue, "we would have to do a lot of cutting down" and considered the possibility of producing music with just a piano, bass guitar, and drums. As the group were contractually obliged to record one more studio album, the band relocated to Emerson's home near Nassau in the Bahamas and recorded Love Beach at the nearby Compass Point Studios in 1978. Lake did not carry out the production duties, leaving Emerson to complete the record on his own after his bandmates returned home when recording was complete. The album has been dismissed by the band, who explained it was produced to fulfill a contractual obligation. Sinfield is credited on the majority of the tracks as a lyricist except "Canario", an instrumental based on Fantasía para un gentilhombre by Spanish composer Joaquín Rodrigo. The second side is taken up with "Memoirs of an Officer and a Gentleman", a four-part 20-minute track that tells a coming of age story of a soldier during the World War II-era. Its cover is a photograph of the group at a beach off an island from Salt Cay, Turks Islands, "decked out as bare-chested late-seventies disco stars". Despite Emerson expressing his disapproval on the album's title and cover to Ertegun, neither was changed.

Love Beach was released in November 1978 and was poorly received by the music press. "All I Want Is You" was released as a single in the UK, but failed to chart. It did sell enough to be certified gold in the US for 500,000 copies sold, in January 1979. In early 1979, Palmer attempted to organise a farewell summer tour and have the group disband at its conclusion. Due to internal problems, such as "what we should play and how we should play it", the tour never materialised. The band made no announcement of their break-up, and Palmer moved on by forming a band, PM, which released one album entitled 1PM.

=== 1985–1989: Related activity ===
In 1985, Emerson and Lake formed Emerson, Lake & Powell with former Rainbow drummer Cozy Powell. Palmer declined to participate in a reunion as he was busy with commitments with Asia. Rumours also linked Bill Bruford to their new line-up, but he was committed to King Crimson and Earthworks. The group's only album, Emerson Lake & Powell, was released in June 1986 and charted at No. 35 in the UK and No. 23 in the US. The single "Touch and Go" went to No. 60 in the US and No. 2 on the Billboard Hot Mainstream Rock Tracks chart. The trio toured the album in 1986, playing material by the Nice and Emerson, Lake & Palmer.

In 1988, Emerson and Palmer joined with Robert Berry to form the band 3. They released an album, To the Power of Three, in 1988.

=== 1990–1998: Re-formation, Black Moon, In the Hot Seat, and second break-up ===
In 1990, former Atlantic Records executive Phil Carson approached Emerson, Lake & Palmer to reunite and produce music for a proposed film. The project never developed, but the trio remained in London and started to come up with new musical ideas. The sessions were productive, with the band working as much as five to six days a week for three months, which convinced them to abandon soundtrack work in favour of putting out a new album. By mid-1991, Carson had secured them with a two-album deal with his new independent label, Victory Music. Lake's voice had deepened by this point, and the band took greater care in the key that songs were written to better suit his vocals. They also utilised modern recording technology to complement the songs, including MIDI and digital sampling, which Palmer said kept their material fresh. Atlantic capitalised on the reunion by releasing The Atlantic Years, a two-and-a-half hour compilation of their early material.

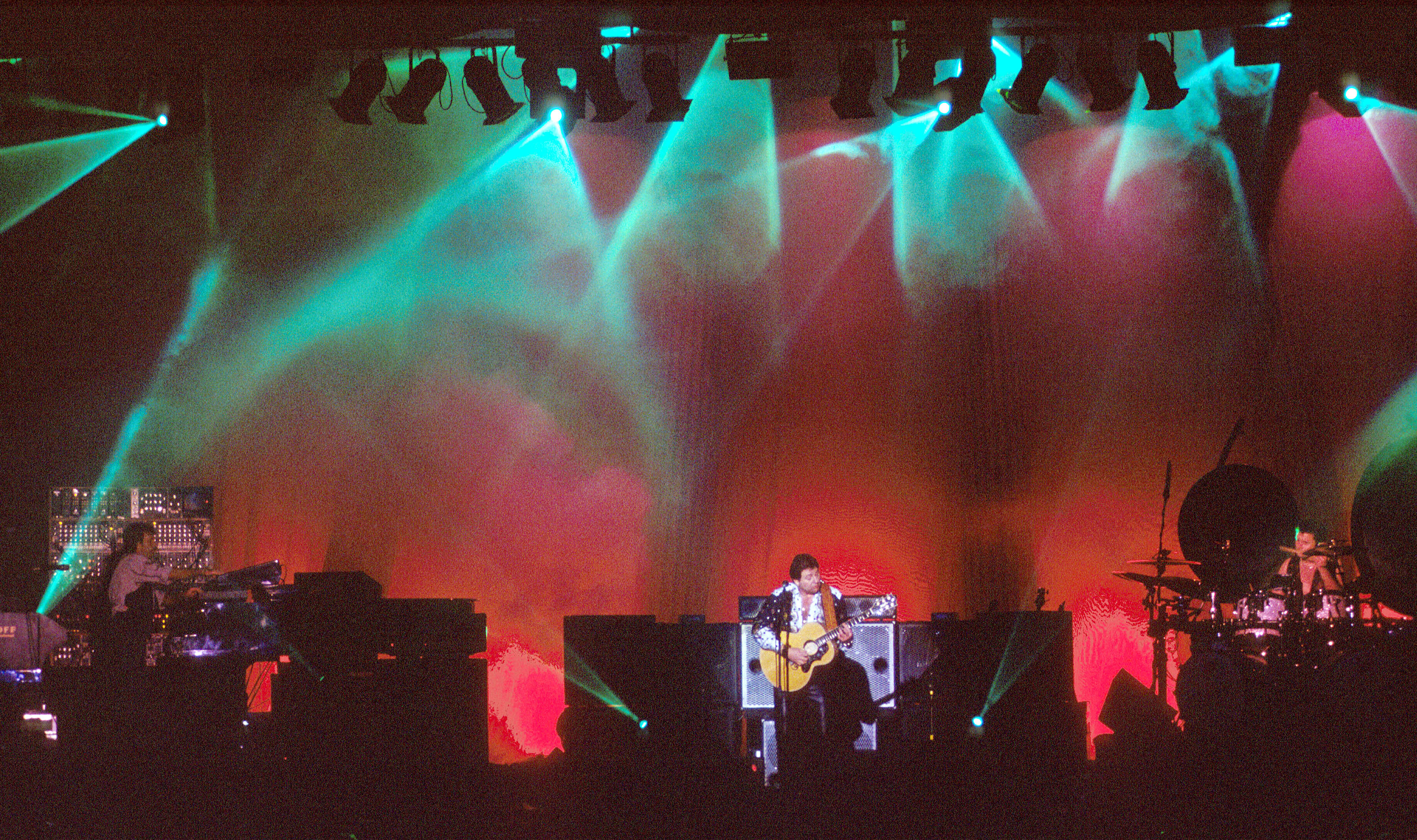
Emerson, Lake and Palmer performing in 1992

Black Moon was released in July 1992; it peaked at No. 78 in the US but failed to chart in the UK. The group supported it with a world tour between July 1992 and April 1993, which included their first shows in England since 1974. The concerts at London's Royal Albert Hall were broadcast on BBC radio and released as a live album in 1993, entitled Live at the Royal Albert Hall. The shows were also filmed and subsequently released on DVD. Later in 1993, Victory Music released The Return of the Manticore a 4-disc box set retrospective of the band's career and previously unreleased studio tracks, including a new studio recording of "Pictures at an Exhibition" in Dolby surround sound.

The band's final studio album, In the Hot Seat, was released in September 1994. Victory Music was in financial trouble by this time, as albums by fellow label acts Tin Machine and Yes failed to generate strong enough sales, causing Victory and producer Keith Olsen to put pressure on Emerson to make a more commercially oriented album with the band. When Emerson reluctantly agreed, Victory and Olsen brought in several individuals to assist in the songwriting; Olsen received a credit on four tracks and Bill Wray on two. In the summer of 1994, the band cancelled an upcoming North American and Japanese tour, and the group split for a short period to pursue solo projects. Emerson underwent surgery to correct a compressed nerve in his arm in October, which left him able to play at only half his previous capacity. Palmer also had an operation to fix his carpal tunnel syndrome. Initial plans to commemorate the band's 25th anniversary in 1995 were shelved. Following the demise of Victory Music, their back catalogue transferred to Rhino Records.

Emerson and Palmer eventually recovered enough to start touring again from August 1996, beginning with a 33-date US tour opening for Jethro Tull. This was followed by a Japanese tour in October, where the group played a full set. In 1997, the band completed a 50-date world tour. It is noted for Emerson's Hammond organ catching fire during the show in Boston. The remains were donated to the Rock and Roll Hall of Fame. In May 1998, Lake's manager announced that the band had started work on a new studio album. This was followed by a North American tour in August as openers for Deep Purple and Dream Theater, which included the "Tarkus" suite performed in its entirety for the first time since 1974. After the tour, friction arose within the group as Lake wanted to relinquish his role as producer on the new album, and blamed the band's recent creative lull on this fact. Emerson and Palmer were against the idea, and claimed Lake had not presented any tangible material for them to work on despite knowing he was collecting ideas for a solo album. The rift resulted in the trio's split by the end of 1998, and a tour booked for the spring of 1999 was cancelled.

=== 2010–present: 40th anniversary concert, deaths of Emerson and Lake, and aftermath ===
In April and May 2010, Emerson and Lake embarked on a North American tour, 'Manticore Hall', with stripped-down versions of Emerson, Lake & Palmer, the Nice, and King Crimson songs. It originated when the pair got together at Lake's home studio earlier in the year to write new songs. When they stopped for a break, they occasionally played an Emerson, Lake & Palmer song which led to the idea of recreating it on stage as it gave the songs a different feel to the originals. The first show of the tour was cancelled at the last minute following a backstage argument between Emerson and Lake, and the following two dates were subsequently cancelled. Later in 2010, the 4-CD box set A Time and a Place was released that features live tracks from 1970 to 1998. Two archival concerts followed in 2011: Live at Nassau Coliseum '78 and Live at the Mar Y Sol Festival '72.

In September 2009, Palmer announced that the band had planned to reform earlier in the year, but it had to be pushed back for Emerson to receive medical attention on one of his hands. The three got together for a one-off concert for their 40th anniversary, headlining the High Voltage Festival at London's Victoria Park on 25 July 2010. The show was recorded and filmed; a live album was released as High Voltage. The DVD and Blu-ray of the concert followed in August 2011, which also contained a documentary on the band's career. Lake said that despite the band having "tremendous technical problems" on stage and struggled at points, the audience were enthusiastic and people enjoyed their performance. Palmer held a more critical view, and said the group rehearsed for five weeks before the show, which he initially considered excessive, but upon hearing the recording, "maybe five weeks was not long enough. It wasn't to the standard that I liked and I didn't think it sounded that good."

Following their 2010 reunion, the band expressed differing opinions regarding their future. In early 2010, Emerson and Lake had not ruled out further Emerson, Lake & Palmer concerts or the possibility of a new studio album; the former said: "I see no reason why we shouldn't be doing more." In 2011, Lake said that Emerson and he were open to the idea of more group activity, but acknowledged Palmer's more negative comments to the press shortly before the 40th anniversary concert. Lake said: "I don't know why Carl has a propensity to dwell on negative issues... Keith and I have had our differences over the years, but we've certainly put them behind us and just forgot about them... I'm waiting for Carl to reach the point of wisdom in his life when he realises that carrying around grudges from the past is pointless." In 2012, Lake was unsure that a reunion could take place: "I doubt very much it will happen because I don't think Carl and Keith are in that same frame of mind." In 2013, Palmer revealed that he put a stop on further group plans.

In December 2010, Emerson, Lake & Palmer signed a worldwide licensing deal with Sony Music Entertainment. In 2012, they secured a new back catalogue agreement with American-based Razor & Tie, and acquired a worldwide catalogue distribution deal with BMG Rights Management three years later.

On 11 March 2016, Emerson died by suicide from a self-inflicted gunshot wound to his head. On 7 December, Lake died from cancer.

In October 2021, Rocket 88 Books released Emerson, Lake & Palmer, the first official book about the band that was made in co-operation with Palmer and Emerson and Lake's families, with Palmer as executive editor. It was available in three editions, Classic, Signature, and Ultimate, all containing rare and previously unpublished interviews and photographs.

== Influence and appraisal ==
A 2016 retrospective review in Rolling Stone listed "10 Essential Songs by EL&P" and noted, "ELP became one of rock's first supergroups upon forming in 1970…The result was a stretch of albums…that turned prog from a black-light-in-the-basement listening experience into a stadium-filling phenomenon. At their heart was Emerson, whose eternal quest for a bigger, grander sound (thanks to a bank of organs and synthesizers that grew to resemble a fortress onstage) helped make ELP one of the most accomplished and absorbing bands rock ever birthed." Koji Kondo, Nintendo's first video game composer, cited ELP as a major influence on his work. Nobuo Uematsu, best known for scoring the majority of titles in the Final Fantasy series, cites ELP as one of his influences. The trio are described as "genuinely classically aware, and openly demonstrated their respect for classical music." They are said to have "formed a genuine fusion between rock and jazz" and were noted for their "virtuosity and their uninhibited aggression."

Despite their success and influence, ELP received criticism from some music critics, one citing a popular joke from the 1970s: "How do you spell pretentious? E-L-P." Robert Christgau said of the band in Rock Albums of the Seventies (1981), "these guys are as stupid as their most pretentious fans", also calling them the "world's most overweening 'progressive' group". John Kelman of All About Jazz noted that an "overbearing sense of self-importance turned ELP from one of the 1970s' most exciting new groups into the definition of masturbatory excess and self-aggrandizement in only a few short years." Kelman also stated that "in their fall from grace, [ELP] represented everything wrong with progressive rock." Paul Stump, in his History of Progressive Rock, likewise attributed ELP's infamy to their decadent activities during progressive rock's fall from favour: "What prompted ELP to do what they did to their listeners, their critics and ultimately themselves in 1977 can only be guessed at. What is certain is that it consigned them to eternal rock notoriety. Even discounting Punk, had not the musical climate changed enough to convince them that epics were out of fashion, both on record and in concert?" DJ John Peel went so far as to describe the band as "a tragic waste of talent and electricity". In an appraisal of the band's legacy, PopMatters journalist Sean Murphy said ELP "wore immoderation like a badge of courage", regardless of whether they were loved or loathed:

Here are three words that strike fear in the hearts of all those allergic to prog rock: Emerson. Lake. Palmer. Popular enough to have several songs still in the regular FM rotation, obscure enough to be forever relegated as one of "those" bands from a certain time and place (the '70s), ambitious enough to attempt things few if any other bands did, for better or worse, pretentious enough to earn the full-throated derision of holier-than-thou tastemakers. And album art awful enough to ensure they will never be forgotten, for better or worse.

== Band members ==
- Keith Emerson – piano, keyboards, synthesizers (died by self-inflicted gunshot in 2016)
- Greg Lake – vocals, guitars, bass guitar (died from cancer in 2016)
- Carl Palmer – drums, percussion

== Discography ==
Main studio and live discography

- Emerson, Lake & Palmer (1970)
- Tarkus (1971)
- Pictures at an Exhibition (1971, live)
- Trilogy (1972)
- Brain Salad Surgery (1973)
- Works Volume 1 (1977)
- Works Volume 2 (1977)
- Love Beach (1978)
- Black Moon (1992)
- In the Hot Seat (1994)
