= Trilogy (Emerson, Lake & Palmer album) =

Studio album by Emerson, Lake & Palmer
- Released: 23 June 1972
- Recorded: October 1971- January 1972
- Studios: Advision, London
- Genre: Progressive rock
- Length: 42:23
- Labels: Island (UK); Cotillion (US)
- Producer: Greg Lake

Emerson, Lake & Palmer chronology
Pictures at an Exhibition (1971)	Trilogy (1972)	Brain Salad Surgery (1973)

Singles from Trilogy
- 1. "Hoedown" Released: July 1972 (France); 2. "From the Beginning" Released: August 1972

Trilogy is the third studio album by English progressive rock supergroup Emerson, Lake & Palmer, released on 23 June 1972, by Island Records. The group had spent most of 1971 touring, and paused in September so they could record a new album at Advision Studios with Eddy Offord resuming his role as engineer. It would be his last with the group, as he later elected to work full-time with Yes. The album features "Hoedown", an arrangement of Aaron Copland's ballet composition which became a live favorite.

The album was a commercial success, reaching No. 2 on the UK Albums Chart and No. 5 on the US Billboard 200. Lake's acoustic song, "From the Beginning", was released as a single in August 1972 and became the band's highest charting US single, reaching No. 39. Lake later picked Trilogy as his favorite Emerson, Lake & Palmer album.

== Recording ==
In September 1971, the band took a break in their tour promoting Tarkus (1971) and Pictures at an Exhibition (1971) to start work on a new studio album. They returned to Advision Studios in London, once again with Lake as producer and Eddy Offord as their engineer. In early 1972, New Musical Express falsely reported that the group were splitting up, causing the band to issue a statement. Keyboardist Keith Emerson had planned to do a solo album of jazz music, but the project was shelved and the band turned down a lucrative offer to write the score to a racing film entitled Fangio. The band recorded the album in October–November 1971 and January 1972.

The album was particularly difficult for Lake to record, as he described the album as "such an accurate record". Palmer noted Trilogy had the most number of overdubs put down on an Emerson, Lake & Palmer album, owing to the "enormous detail" put into the arrangements of the songs. Emerson was pleased with the album after it was completed, noting its varied arrangements and difference in style compared to Tarkus. Greg Lake also later identified it as his favorite ELP album. However, the extensive use of overdubs on 24-track machines meant that many pieces including "The Endless Enigma", "Trilogy" and "Abaddon's Bolero" proved difficult to play live and were consequently dropped from live performance early in the accompanying tour. As a result, the band vowed that their next album would be one they could reproduce entirely on stage.

References to a quad version of this album appeared in 1974 Harrison or Schwann record and tape guides, listing Trilogy in the Quadraphonic 8-track tape cartridge format. Collectors report never seeing a Trilogy Q8 at retail, despite its having a catalogue number "Cotillion QT-9903".

== Songs ==
=== Side one ===
"The Endless Enigma" is a suite in three parts; the first section begins with the sound of a beating heart. The second part, "Fugue", is a classical fugue with Emerson on piano and Lake playing counterpoint on bass. The third section returns to the "Endless Enigma" theme, ending on a series of horn-like synth fanfares. The beating heart effect in the first section is sometimes asserted to have been created by the Ludwig Speed King bass drum pedal of Palmer's Ludwig Octaplus kit. However, in the sleeve notes to the 2015 CD/DVD reissue, remix engineer Jakko Jakszyk is quoted as saying "I've discovered [it is] actually Greg playing... muted strings on his bass guitar". Emerson can also be heard playing a zurna, a Eurasian wind instrument.

"From the Beginning" is a soft, acoustic guitar-based ballad that peaked at No. 39 on the US charts. More often appearing in ELP compilations than live concerts, the track lent its name to a 1997 retrospective of Greg Lake's work. An alternate version of the song featuring a different take of the closing Moog solo is found on the 2015 deluxe reissue.

"The Sheriff" was written as a prelude to the western-themed "Hoedown", which closes the side. During the opening drum solo, Palmer accidentally hit the rim of his tom-tom with a drumstick, and he can be heard responding with "Shit!". The song ends with a honky tonk-type piano solo with Palmer playing woodblocks.

"Hoedown" is an arrangement of "Hoe-Down" from the ballet Rodeo (1942) by American composer Aaron Copland, who gave the band permission to adapt the piece. It became a live favorite and opened the band's shows between 1972 and 1974.

=== Side two ===
The title track is divided, as per its name, into three distinct sections. The first section is a romantic piano ballad a la "Take A Pebble", with lyrics about a broken relationship. The full band abruptly enters with bass, drums, and layers of Moog synthesizers for the second part, which is played in a robust 10/8 and features extensive soloing from Emerson. For the final section Lake's vocal returns as the full band continues to play, now in 12/8, before ending on a showbiz coda. "Trilogy" was attempted on the spring 1972 tour but proved difficult to recreate without the extensive studio overdubs and was dropped from the set list after only two shows. Despite this, the track remains popular with ELP fans and is included on almost all compilations.

"Living Sin" is a hard rock number about an aggressive groupie that was never played live by the group, although a version with Marc Bonilla on guitar was attempted by the Keith Emerson Band. The remix of "Living Sin" on the 2015 reissue features an additional section of Emerson's solo.

"Abaddon's Bolero" sounds like a bolero turned into a march (in 4/4 rhythm rather than the usual 3/4). The piece was originally titled Bellona's Bolero after the goddess of war. A single melody containing multiple modulations within itself is repeated over and over in ever more thickly layered arrangements, starting from a quiet Hammond organ making a flute-like sound over a snare drum, and building up to a wall of sound – Maurice Ravel's famous Boléro uses a similar effect. There is also a quote from the British traditional song "The Girl I Left Behind". "Abaddon's Bolero" is replete with overdubs. Almost every time an instrument comes in, another overdub follows. Like the title track, "Abaddon's Bolero" was only played live a handful of times, with Greg Lake handling Mellotron, bass pedals, and additional Moog synthesizer duties (other synth parts accompanied them from a reel-to-reel tape playing off-stage which Emerson had pre-recorded); the song turned out to be a disaster, and led to a heated backstage argument when the tape stopped mid-way through the song during one show, after which, it was cut from the set list. The band brought the piece back for the start of their 1977 tour, during which they were accompanied by an orchestra.

== Cover ==
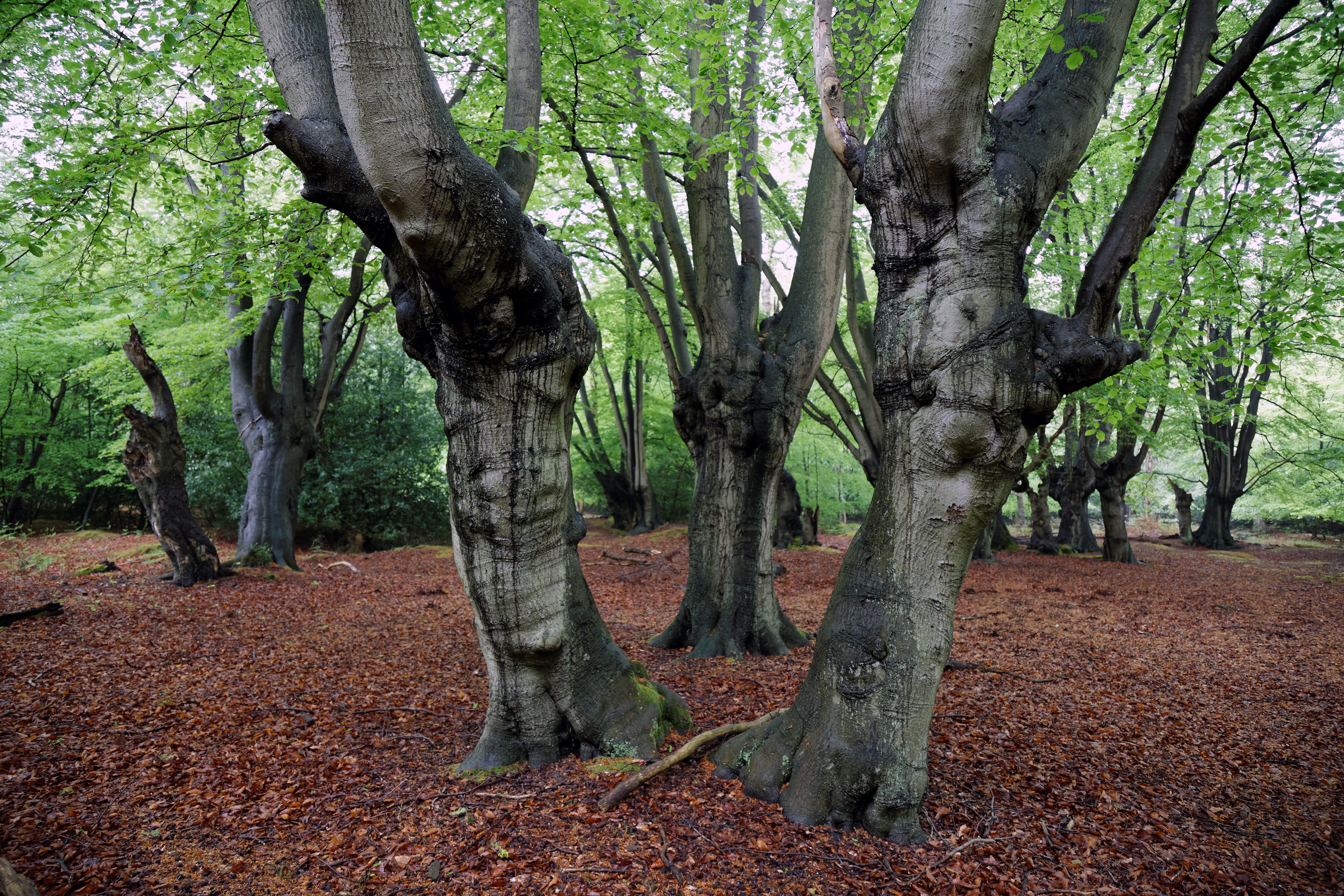
The sleeve features the band photographed in Epping Forest

The artwork was designed by Hipgnosis. It depicts a combined bust of the three members, while the interior of the original gatefold sleeve features a photomontage of the three in Epping Forest. Spanish artist Salvador Dalí was approached to design it, but he requested $50,000 to do it and was turned down. The front cover depicts each of the band members' faces; Emerson said this was because their previous albums had not featured them.

== Reception ==
Professional ratings
Review scores
Source	Rating
AllMusic	4/5 stars
Christgau's Record Guide	C−
The Daily Vault	B−
MusicHound Rock	3.5/5 stars
The New Rolling Stone Record Guide	3/5 stars

The album reached No. 5 on the Billboard 200—their highest charting studio release in the US—and peaked at No. 2 on the UK Albums chart. It appeared in the Top 10 in Denmark for 4 non-consecutive weeks, peaking at No. 6.

Robert Christgau said in his review that "anybody who buys a record that divides a ... composition called 'The Endless Enigma' into two discrete parts deserves it." Billboard praised the album for Keith Emerson's "steady progression" on the Moog synthesizer, while Cashbox called the group "rockdom's most explosive trio", found "From The Beginning" especially favorable and predicted the album would "find its way onto the top ten in nothing flat". Tony Palmer of The Observer thought the group "demonstrates an extraordinary degree of bombast with little or no creative imagination at work to justify all the sound and fury".

Retrospectively AllMusic commented that engineer Eddie Offord "provided a lush, comfy finish to the album that made it particularly suited for living room listening and the FM airwaves." Consequence of Sound wrote that the album found the group at the height of their powers, which cemented them as "one of the most experimental and ambitious groups in rock". When reviewing the 2015 deluxe reissue for Louder, Philip Wilding noted that 40 years on, the album's "bravura, pomposity and daring experimentation remain intact". Conversely, The Daily Vault gave the album a mixed B− grade with the summation "There are a handful of moments to make it interesting, and the band's professionalism and chemistry makes it listenable, but it rarely reaches the brilliance of the debut or the overblown grandeur of Brain Salad Surgery.

== Reissues ==
The album has been reissued a number of times, the most recent as part of a deluxe edition release campaign by Sony Record Group on the 27 April 2015. The original mix was included along with a brand new stereo mix across two CDs and featuring both on an audio DVD.

== Track listing ==
Side one
No.	Title	Lyrics	Music	Length
1.	"The Endless Enigma (Part 1)"	Greg Lake	Keith Emerson	6:41
2.	"Fugue"	instrumental	Emerson	1:56
3.	"The Endless Enigma (Part 2)"	Lake	Emerson	2:03
4.	"From the Beginning"	Lake	Lake	4:16
5.	"The Sheriff"	Lake	Emerson	3:22
6.	"Hoedown"	instrumental	Aaron Copland, arr. Emerson, Lake, Carl Palmer	3:47
Total length:				22:05

Side two
No.	Title	Lyrics	Music	Length
1.	"Trilogy"	Lake	Emerson	8:54
2.	"Living Sin"	Lake	Emerson, Lake, Palmer	3:13
3.	"Abaddon's Bolero"	instrumental	Emerson	8:08
Total length:				20:15

=== 2015 deluxe edition ===
Disc one - CD - The Original 1972 Album (2015 Remaster)
No.	Title	Length
1.	"The Endless Enigma (Part 1)"	6:41
2.	"Fugue"	1:56
3.	"The Endless Enigma (Part 2)"	2:02
4.	"From the Beginning"	4:13
5.	"The Sheriff"	3:22
6.	"Hoedown"	3:45
7.	"Trilogy"	8:52
8.	"Living Sin"	3:10
9.	"Abaddon's Bolero"	8:07

Disc two - CD - The Alternate Album (Jakko M Jakszyk 2015 Stereo Mixes)
No.	Title	Length
1.	"From the Beginning" (Alternate Version)	4:16
2.	"The Endless Enigma (Part 1)" (New Stereo Mix)	6:43
3.	"Fugue" (New Stereo Mix)	1:57
4.	"The Endless Enigma (Part 2)" (New Stereo Mix)	2:03
5.	"From the Beginning" (New Stereo Mix)	4:17
6.	"The Sheriff" (New Stereo Mix)	3:24
7.	"Hoedown"	3:46
8.	"Trilogy" (New Stereo Mix)	8:58
9.	"Living Sin" (New Stereo Mix)	3:11
10.	"Abaddon's Bolero" (New Stereo Mix)	8:13

Disc three - DVDA 5.1 Trilogy
No.	Title	Length
1.	"The Endless Enigma (Part 1)"	6:41
2.	"Fugue"	1:56
3.	"The Endless Enigma (Part 2)"	2:01
4.	"From the Beginning"	4:14
5.	"The Sheriff"	3:22
6.	"Hoedown"	3:46
7.	"Trilogy"	8:52
8.	"Living Sin"	3:11
9.	"Abaddon's Bolero"	8:08
10.	"The Endless Enigma (Part 1)" (New Stereo Mix)	6:45
11.	"Fugue" (New Stereo Mix)	1:57
12.	"The Endless Enigma (Part 2)" (New Stereo Mix)	2:02
13.	"From the Beginning" (New Stereo Mix)	4:17
14.	"The Sheriff" (New Stereo Mix)	3:24
15.	"Hoedown"	3:46
16.	"Trilogy" (New Stereo Mix)	8:58
17.	"Living Sin" (New Stereo Mix)	3:14
18.	"Abaddon's Bolero" (New Stereo Mix)	8:22
19.	"From the Beginning" (Alternate Version)	4:16

== Personnel ==
Credits are adapted from the album's 1972 liner notes.

=== Emerson, Lake & Palmer ===
- Keith Emerson – Hammond C3 organ, Steinway piano, zurna (listed as a "Zoukra"), Moog synthesiser III-C, Mini-Moog model D synthesiser
- Greg Lake – vocals, bass guitar, electric and acoustic guitars
- Carl Palmer – drums, percussion

=== Production ===
- Eddy Offord – production engineer
- Greg Lake – production
- Hipgnosis – cover design and photography
- Phil Crinnell – tinting

== Singles ==
- "From the Beginning" / "Living Sin" (USA release)

== Charts ==
=== Weekly charts ===
Chart (1972)	Peak position
Australian Albums (Kent Music Report)	18
Canada Top Albums/CDs (RPM)	5
Dutch Albums (Album Top 100)	4
Finnish Albums (The Official Finnish Charts)	2
German Albums (Offizielle Top 100)	6
Italian Albums (Musica e Dischi)	2
Japanese Albums (Oricon)	4
Norwegian Albums (VG-lista)	4
UK Albums (Official Charts)	2
US Billboard 200	5

Chart (2015)	Peak position
Italian Albums (FIMI)	88
Scottish Albums (Official Charts)	70
UK Rock & Metal Albums (Official Charts)	6

=== Year-end charts ===
Chart (1972)	Position
German Albums (Offizielle Top 100)	38

== Certifications ==
Region	Certification	Certified units/sales
United Kingdom (BPI)	Gold	100,000^{^}
United States (RIAA)	Gold	500,000^{^}
^{^} Shipments figures based on certification alone.
