= Pictures at an Exhibition (Emerson, Lake & Palmer album) =

Live album by Emerson, Lake & Palmer
- Released: November 1971
- Recorded: 26 March 1971
- Venues: Newcastle City Hall, Newcastle
- Genres: Progressive rock; symphonic rock; classical crossover; art rock
- Length: 38:00
- Labels: Island (UK); Cotillion (US)
- Producer: Greg Lake

Emerson, Lake & Palmer chronology
Tarkus (1971)	Pictures at an Exhibition (1971)	Trilogy (1972)

Emerson, Lake & Palmer live chronology
Pictures at an Exhibition (1971)	Welcome Back, My Friends, to the Show That Never Ends (1974)

Singles from Pictures at an Exhibition
- 1. "Nut Rocker" Released: February 1972

Pictures at an Exhibition is a live album by English progressive rock band Emerson, Lake & Palmer, released in the United Kingdom in November 1971 by Island Records and in the United States in January 1972 by Cotillion Records. It features the group's adaptation of Pictures at an Exhibition, the piano suite by Modest Mussorgsky, performed at Newcastle City Hall on 26 March 1971.

The album concludes with the concert's encore, "Nut Rocker", a rock adaptation of The Nutcracker originally arranged by Kim Fowley and recorded by B. Bumble and the Stingers in 1962.

Pictures at an Exhibition went to number 3 on the UK Albums Chart and number 10 on the US Billboard 200. In 2001, it was reissued as a remastered edition that included a studio version of the piece recorded in 1993.

== Background ==
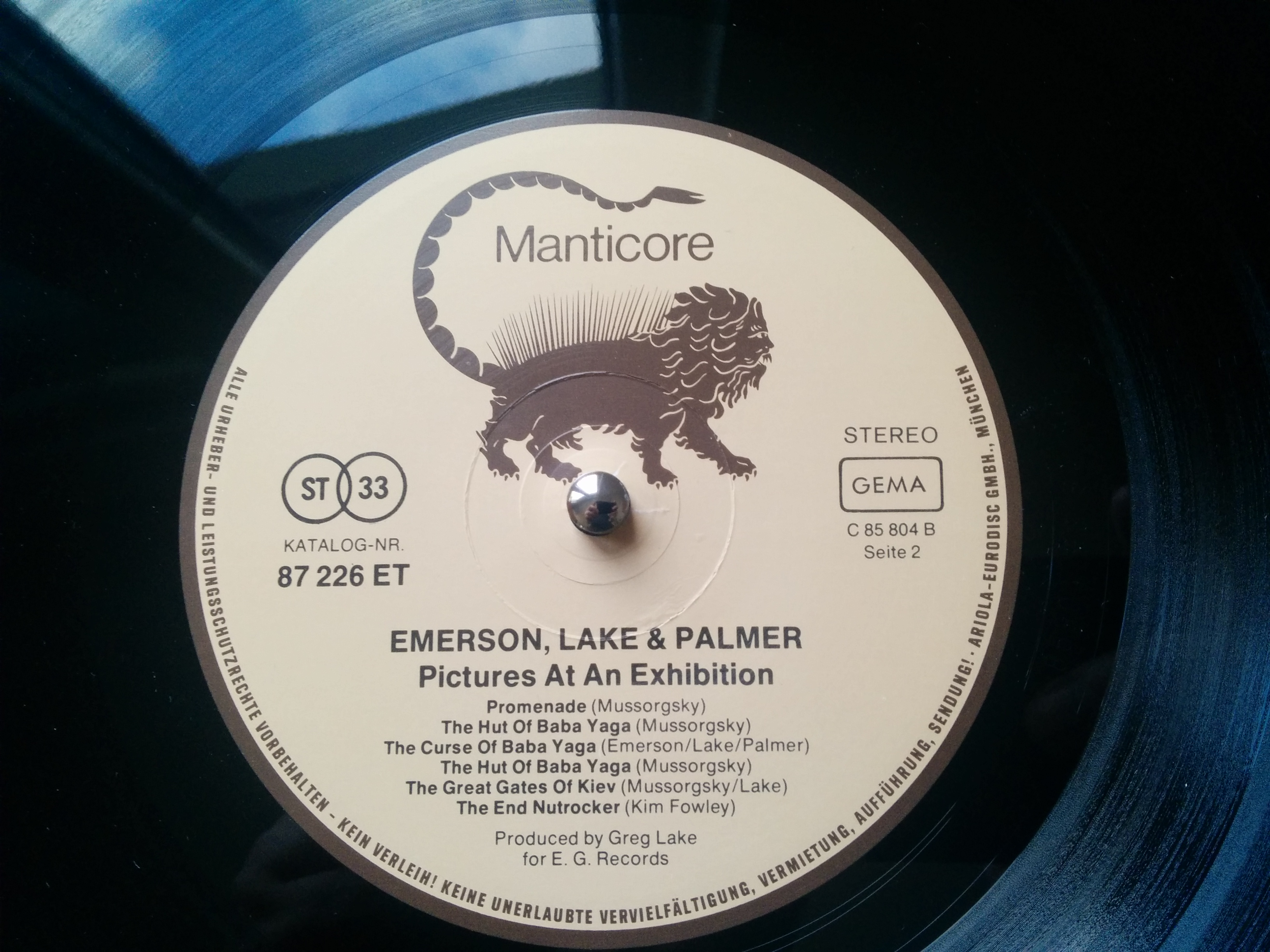
Label of a German edition of Pictures at an Exhibition

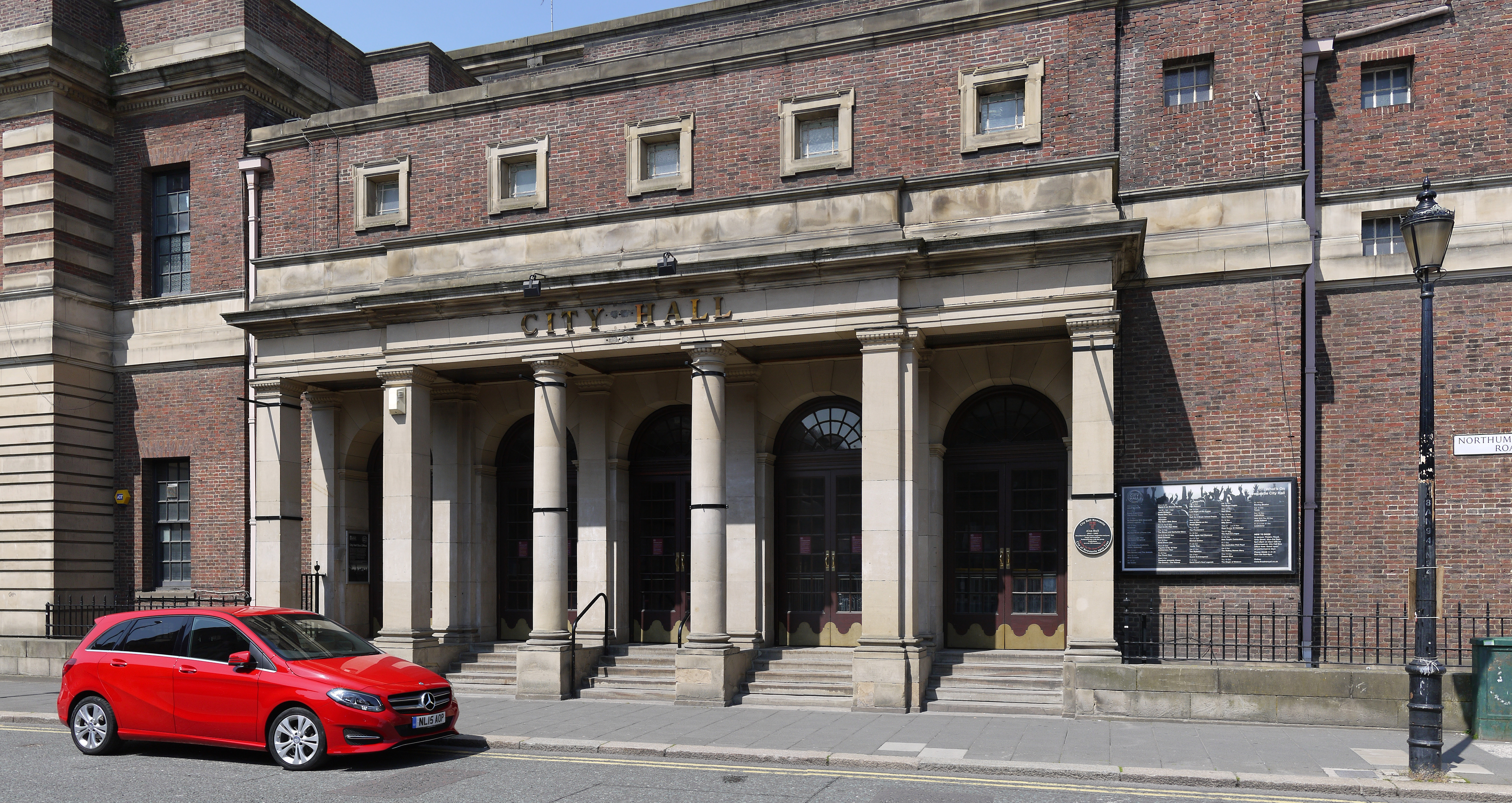
Newcastle's City Hall

In February 1971, Emerson, Lake & Palmer finished recording their second studio album Tarkus. They resumed touring in the following month, which began with a UK leg that included a show at Newcastle City Hall, Newcastle on 26 March. The tour's setlist included their arrangement of the classical suite Pictures at an Exhibition by Modest Mussorgsky, which had been performed since their live debut in August 1970. Keyboardist Keith Emerson had attended an orchestral performance of the suite several years before, and bought a copy of the score. He pitched the idea of performing the suite to singer/bassist/guitarist Greg Lake and drummer Carl Palmer, who agreed to adapt it. Both members contributed their own arrangements and additions to the suite.

The band had already recorded and filmed a live performance of the piece at the Lyceum Theatre in London, on 9 December 1970, and planned a live album release around August 1971. However, their dissatisfaction with the picture, editing, and audio led to the decision to record another show. Palmer deemed the film "shocking" which lacked any contemporary filming technique, and said the absence of engineer Eddy Offord to control the sound contributed to its substandard quality. The date at Newcastle City Hall was chosen for the new recording, and Palmer recalled the "amazing atmosphere" of the concert. Emerson said the venue was chosen as the band were popular there, and hoped to use its pipe organ. He was granted permission, but had to promise the Musician's Union he would not stick knives on the console, which he had done since he was in The Nice. The band paid for the recording costs themselves, with the aim of producing the best quality version. They arrived at Newcastle at 10am and underwent rehearsals and checks for several hours. The Lyceum concert film had a limited theatrical release, which Palmer said was only due to the fact that a group friend was in charge and let them release it.

The album was recorded using the mobile recording unit from Pye Records. The opening section, "Promenade", features Emerson playing a Harrison & Harrison pipe organ which was installed at the venue in 1928. The organ console is some way above stage level, at the top of a stepped terrace typically used for choral performances. Palmer's drum roll connecting "Promenade" to the following section was added to give Emerson time to return to his keyboards.

== Arrangement ==
The band's arrangement of the suite uses only four of the ten parts in Mussorgsky's suite, along with the linking "Promenade" sections. The suite was performed live as one continuous piece, with new, group-written sections linking Mussorgsky's original themes.

Note that Mussorgsky's original compositions are listed in bold:

1. "Promenade": Pipe organ solo by Emerson at the Harrison & Harrison pipe organ of the auditorium; followed by a drum roll
2. "The Gnome": Group instrumental adaptation featuring fuzz bass, Hammond and Moog
3. "Promenade": Hammond organ and soft vocal, followed by a short synthesizer solo
4. "The Sage": A new picture drawn by Lake solely on acoustic guitar in the mood of a medieval minnesang, it works as a sort of romantic prelude to "The Old Castle"
5. "The Old Castle": Begins with Emerson squeezing out whoops and whistles from the Moog's ribbon controller, followed by an accelerated adaptation of the original theme played by the full band
6. "Blues Variation": a Hammond-driven twelve-bar blues credited to the group, borrowing themes from "The Old Castle" and those that Emerson had previously performed with The Nice on their version of "My Back Pages"
7. "Promenade": Full group instrumental version of the primary theme
8. "The Hut of Baba Yaga": Full group instrumental adaptation
9. "The Curse of Baba Yaga": Lake adapts a section of Mussorgsky's music on fuzz/wah-wah bass, followed by a group-penned section with lyrics/vocal climaxing on a siren-like Moog solo
10. "The Hut of Baba Yaga": Full group reprise of the earlier "Hut" theme
11. "The Great Gates of Kiev": with lyrics/vocal added by the group and an extended climax featuring Emerson dragging his Hammond organ across the stage to produce feedback

== Cover ==
The cover was designed and painted by William Neal, who produced every canvas. Palmer bought one of them after he had completed it. The album was packaged in a gatefold sleeve, the outside of which depicts blank picture frames labelled with the titles of the pictures: "The Old Castle", "The Gnome", etc. The paintings were large oil paintings containing various images related to the band, like the Tarkus background in "The Hut" and the white dove embossed into the titanium white oil paint in "Promenade" (visible only on the original painting), resembling the cover of the band's debut album. On the inner gatefold all of the paintings were revealed, but "Promenade" remains blank; this section of the suite is not about a picture, but represents a walk through the exhibition. Some later pressings on CD use only the "revealed" version.

Neal's paintings were later hung at Hammersmith Town Hall, and photographed by Keith Morris and Nigel Marlow, both former graduates from Guildford School of Art.

== Release and reception ==
Professional ratings
Review scores
Source	Rating
AllMusic	3.5/5 stars
Christgau's Record Guide	D+
MusicHound Rock	1/5 stars
Rolling Stone	(unfavorable)
The Daily Vault	B+
Sound & Vision	4.5/5 stars

After the album was recorded Lake was wary that its classical content would make the public compare Emerson, Lake & Palmer to The Nice, and argued against its release before Tarkus. As a compromise Pictures at an Exhibition was to be released at a budget price, but upon learning this Atlantic Records vetoed the idea. The label could not decide whether to promote it as a rock or classical record and at one point, considered putting it out on an associated label, Nonesuch Records, that handled classical releases. Fearing that this would lead to poor sales, the band decided to shelve the work. Palmer said the group received letters from fans expressing their anger at the delay. After the album was broadcast in its entirety on WNEW-FM in New York City, the public's demand for the album convinced Atlantic to release it at full price. The band had hoped to release it in the UK for 99p, but it was released at £1.49. Originally, the group had thought of releasing Pictures at an Exhibition as a double album, with the suite on disc one and the material they had recorded for Trilogy (1972) on disc two, but they thought the public had waited long enough for Pictures to be released and wanted to put it out sooner.

The album was released in November 1971 and reached number 3 on the UK Albums Chart. Budget-priced albums were eligible for inclusion at the time of release, but a change in chart regulations in early 1972 excluded them, which meant that the album disappeared from the chart after just five weeks. In the US, the album peaked at number 10 on the Billboard 200 chart.

Critical reception to the album was generally favorable in the UK (where ELP won the Melody Maker poll for best group that year) but quite harsh in America, where a new contingent of rock critics was beginning to rail against the excesses of progressive rock. Robert Christgau gave the album a D+ and Lester Bangs, writing for Rolling Stone, brutally mocked the attempt at recording a classical suite. The album was a great success with fans, however, and a shortened version of "Pictures" continued to be used as a live encore through the remainder of the band's career. The album continues to evoke a highly divided reaction among critics.

The album was included in the book 1001 Albums You Must Hear Before You Die.

=== Reissues ===
The album was reissued in 2001 with a new master and a bonus studio version of the suite recorded in 1993 that was released The Return of the Manticore (1993) box set and some pressings of In the Hot Seat (1994). A new remaster was issued in a 2005 Deluxe Edition included the live performance of the suite from the 1970 Isle of Wight Festival. The album was remastered once more in 2016, containing live bonus tracks from the 1972 Mar y Sol Festival (actually only the track "Pictures at an Exhibition (Medley)") and the December 9, 1970 Lyceum Theatre concert (almost the complete show).

== Track listing ==
All music by Modest Mussorgsky, except where noted. All lyrics by Greg Lake and Richard Fraser.

Side one
No.	Title	Writer(s)	Length
1.	"Promenade"	Modest Mussorgsky, arr. Keith Emerson	1:58
2.	"The Gnome"	Mussorgsky, arr. Carl Palmer	4:18
3.	"Promenade"	Mussorgsky, arr. Emerson, Greg Lake / lyrics: Lake	1:23
4.	"The Sage"	Lake	4:42
5.	"The Old Castle"	Mussorgsky, arr. Emerson	2:33
6.	"Blues Variation"	Emerson, Lake, Palmer	4:22

Side two
No.	Title	Writer(s)	Length
7.	"Promenade"	Mussorgsky, arr. Emerson	1:29
8.	"The Hut of Baba Yaga"	Mussorgsky, arr. Emerson	1:12
9.	"The Curse of Baba Yaga"	Emerson, Lake, Palmer	4:10
10.	"The Hut of Baba Yaga"	Mussorgsky, arr. Emerson	1:06
11.	"The Great Gates of Kiev"	Mussorgsky, arr. Emerson / lyrics: Lake	6:37
12.	"Nut Rocker"	Pyotr Tchaikovsky, Kim Fowley, arr. Emerson, Lake, Palmer	4:26

== Personnel ==
Emerson, Lake & Palmer

- Keith Emerson – Hammond C3 and L100 organ, pipe organ, Moog modular synthesizer, Minimoog, Clavinet
- Greg Lake – bass guitar, acoustic guitar, vocals
- Carl Palmer – drums, percussion

Production

- Greg Lake – producer
- Eddy Offord – engineer
- Joseph M. Palmaccio – remastering
- Keith Emerson – musical arrangement
- Greg Lake – musical arrangement
- William Neal – cover design and painting
- Nigel Marlow – photography
- Keith Morris – photography

== Charts ==
Chart (1971-72)	Peak position
Australian Albums (Kent Music Report)	19
Canada Top Albums/CDs (RPM)	3
Dutch Albums (Album Top 100)	6
Finnish Albums (The Official Finnish Charts)	8
German Albums (Offizielle Top 100)	9
Italian Albums (Musica e Dischi)	5
Japanese Albums (Oricon)	2
Norwegian Albums (VG-lista)	18
UK Albums (Official Charts)	3
US Billboard 200	10

Chart (2016)	Peak position
UK Independent Albums (Official Charts)	32
UK Rock & Metal Albums (Official Charts)	22

== Certifications ==
Region	Certification	Certified units/sales
United Kingdom (BPI)	Silver	60,000^{^}
United States (RIAA)	Gold	500,000^{^}
^{^} Shipments figures based on certification alone.
