= The Ultimate Collection (Emerson, Lake & Palmer album) =

Greatest hits album by Emerson, Lake & Palmer
- Released: 2004
- Genre: Progressive rock
- Length: 2:21:47

Emerson, Lake & Palmer chronology
From the Front Row...Live! (2003)	The Ultimate Collection (2004)	The Original Bootleg Series from the Manticore Vaults Vol.4 (2006)

Professional ratings
Review scores
Source	Rating
AllMusic	3.5/5 stars

The Ultimate Collection is a compilation album by British progressive rock band Emerson, Lake & Palmer, released in 2004.

== Track listing ==
Disc 1
No.	Title	Length
1.	"Fanfare for the Common Man"	9:40
2.	"Still...You Turn Me On"	3:43
3.	"Hoedown"	5:03
4.	"Black Moon"	6:53
5.	"Tarkus: Eruption/Stones of Years/Iconoclast/Mass/Manticore/Battlefield/Aquatarkus"	20:35
6.	"Jerusalem"	2:41
7.	"Tiger in a Spotlight"	4:31
8.	"Better Days"	5:32
9.	"I Believe in Father Christmas"	3:15
10.	"From the Beginning"	4:11
11.	"Knife-Edge"	5:03
12.	"Karn Evil 9: 1st Impression, Pt. 1"	4:47

Disc 2
No.	Title	Length
1.	"Karn Evil 9: 1st Impression, Pt. 2"	4:48
2.	"Nut Rocker"	4:00
3.	"Peter Gunn Theme"	3:33
4.	"All I Want Is You"	2:31
5.	"Brain Salad Surgery"	3:05
6.	"Take a Pebble"	12:26
7.	"C'est la Vie"	4:14
8.	"Lucky Man"	4:35
9.	"Affairs of the Heart"	3:43
10.	"Canario"	3:56
11.	"Pirates"	13:17
12.	"The Great Gates of Kiev"	6:27

== Charts ==
Chart (2004)	Peak position
Italian Albums (FIMI)	59
Scottish Albums (OCC)	48
UK Albums (OCC)	43
UK Independent Albums (OCC)	5

Chart (2020)	Peak position
Scottish Albums (OCC)	18
UK Independent Albums (OCC)	2
