= The Very Best of Emerson, Lake & Palmer =

Greatest hits album by Emerson, Lake & Palmer
- Released: 2000
- Recorded: 1970–79
- Genre: Progressive rock
- Length: 78:36
- Label: Rhino; Manticore
- Producer: Greg Lake

Emerson, Lake & Palmer chronology
Then and Now (1998)	The Very Best of Emerson, Lake & Palmer (2000)	Extended Versions: The Encore Collection (2000)

The Very Best of Emerson, Lake & Palmer is a greatest hits album by the British progressive rock band Emerson, Lake & Palmer, released in 2000.

== Reception ==
Professional ratings
Review scores
Source	Rating
AllMusic	4/5 stars

Stephen Thomas Erlewine of AllMusic gave the compilation 4 out of 5 stars, and wrote that "diehards will probably not need it (even if the liner notes are quite good), but since it condenses much of the band's noteworthy moments to one disc, casual fans will likely find this a collection to embrace."

== Track listing ==
1. "Lucky Man" (4:37)
2. "Knife-Edge" (Adapted from Leoš Janácek's Sinfonia) (5:05)
3. "From the Beginning" (4:13)
4. "Trilogy" (8:54)
5. "Jerusalem" (2:44)
6. "Toccata" (Adaptation of Alberto Ginastera's 1st Piano Concerto) (7:21)
7. "Karn Evil 9: 1st Impression, Part 2" (4:43)
8. "Still...You Turn Me On" (2:53)
9. "Pirates" (13:20)
10. "Fanfare for the Common Man" (9:41)
11. "C'est la Vie" (Live version) (4:15)
12. "Peter Gunn (Live version)" (3:38)
13. "The Hut of Baba Yaga/The Great Gates of Kiev (Live version)" (7:07)

== Personnel ==
- Keith Emerson - keyboards
- Greg Lake - bass, double-bass, cello, acoustic and electric (guitar), vocals
- Carl Palmer - drums, percussion
