= Live in Poland (Emerson, Lake & Palmer album) =

Live album by Emerson, Lake & Palmer
- Released: 1997 (Poland)
- Recorded: June 22, 1997
- Genre: Progressive rock
- Length: 69:09 (Officially released); 77:07 (The Austrian Edition)
- Label: Sanctuary Records - Castle Records The Austrian edition
- Producer: Tomasz Dziubinski

Emerson, Lake & Palmer chronology
King Biscuit Flower Hour: Greatest Hits Live (1997)	Live in Poland (1997)	Live at the Isle of Wight Festival 1970 (1997)

Professional ratings
Review scores
Source	Rating
AllMusic	3/5 stars
Classic Rock	2/5 stars

Live in Poland is a live album by the progressive rock group Emerson, Lake & Palmer. It features a performance in Katowice, Poland, during June 1997. The performance was originally released exclusively in Poland in 1997, with a different cover, by Polish music company Metal Mind Productions (the track list was the same as on the Austrian release, with piano solo as a separate track; "Karn Evil 9: 1st Impression, Part 2" was entitled "Welcome Back"). It would be released in the UK for the first time in September 1999, and in the United States in May 2001.

The setlist features all-time classics of the band (The classic concert opening from "Karn Evil 9", "Knife-Edge", "Take a Pebble," "Lucky Man," and "Tarkus," the last one presented here in a medley with two sections from the Pictures at an Exhibition suite.), uncommon performances (A remake of the Emerson, Lake & Powell classic "Touch and Go," and "Bitches Crystal") and solos by all the three members of the band (Keith Emerson on track 6, on an 8-minute performance on Grand Piano, Greg Lake on "From the Beginning" and "Lucky Man," and Carl Palmer on a section of "Blue Rondo a la Turk").

== Track listing (Officially released) ==
1. "Karn Evil 9: 1st Impression, Pt. 2" (Emerson, Lake) – 5:26
2. "Touch and Go" (Emerson, Lake) – 3:54
3. "From the Beginning" (Lake) – 4:07
4. "Knife-Edge" (Emerson, Richard Fraser, Leoš Janáček, Lake) – 5:44
5. "Bitches Crystal" (Emerson, Lake) – 4:04
6. "Take a Pebble" (Emerson, Lake, Palmer) – 6:36
7. "Lucky Man" (Lake) – 4:21
8. "Medley" – 16:59
  - "Tarkus (Emerson, Lake)/Pictures at an Exhibition (Modest Mussorgsky, arr. by Emerson, Lake)"
9. "Medley" – 17:54
  - "Fanfare for the Common Man/Rondo" (Dave Brubeck, Aaron Copland, arr. by Emerson, Lake, Palmer)

== Track listing (The Austrian edition) ==
1. "Karn Evil 9: 1st Impression, Pt. 2" (Emerson, Lake) – 5:26
2. "Touch and Go" (Emerson, Lake) – 3:54
3. "From the Beginning" (Lake) – 4:07
4. "Knife-Edge" (Emerson, Fraser, Janáček, Lake) – 5:44
5. "Bitches Crystal" (Emerson, Lake) – 4:04
6. "Piano Solo" – 7:57
  1. "Creole Dance" (Alberto Ginastera)
  2. "Honky Tonk Train Blues" (Meade Lux Lewis)
7. "Take a Pebble" (Emerson, Lake, Palmer) – 6:36
8. "Lucky Man" (Lake) – 4:21
9. "Medley" – 16:59
  1. "Tarkus"
    1. "Eruption" (Emerson)
    2. "Stones of Years" (Emerson, Lake)
    3. "Iconoclast" (Emerson)
    4. "Mass" (Emerson, Lake)
  2. "Pictures at an Exhibition"
    1. "The Hut of Baba Yaga" (Mussorgsky)
    2. "The Great Gates of Kiev" (Lake, Mussorgsky)
10. "Fanfare for the Common Man/Blue Rondo á la Turk" (Brubeck, Copland) – 17:54
- The Austrian edition is the unique which features Emerson's piano solo on a separate track, and presents Karn Evil 9 under the title "Welcome Back".

== Personnel ==
=== Band members ===
- Keith Emerson - keyboards
- Greg Lake - bass, guitars, vocals
- Carl Palmer - percussion, drums
