= High Voltage (Emerson, Lake & Palmer album) =

Live album by Emerson, Lake & Palmer
- Released: October 5, 2010
- Recorded: Victoria Park, London 25 July 2010
- Genre: Progressive rock
- Length: 90:30
- Label: Concert Live
- Producer: Greg Lake

Emerson, Lake & Palmer chronology
The Original Bootleg Series from the Manticore Vaults (2006)	High Voltage (2010)	A Time and a Place (2010)

High Voltage is a double live album by British progressive rock band Emerson, Lake & Palmer, released in 2010.

On 25 July 2010, Emerson, Lake and Palmer played a one-off 40th anniversary concert, headlining the High Voltage Festival event in Victoria Park, London. The entire concert was later released as the double-CD live album "High Voltage". With the deaths of Keith Emerson and Greg Lake in 2016, the High Voltage concert constitutes the final performance of Emerson, Lake and Palmer as a band.

== Track listing ==
Disc 1

1. "Karn Evil 9: 1st Impression - Part 2"
2. "The Barbarian"
3. "Bitches Crystal"
4. "Knife-Edge"
5. "From the Beginning"
6. "Touch and Go"
7. "Take a Pebble"
8. "Tarkus (Eruption/Stones Of Years/Iconoclast/Mass/Battlefield/Aquatarkus)"

Disc 2

1. "Farewell to Arms"
2. "Lucky Man"
3. "Pictures at an Exhibition medley"
  - "Promenade"
  - "The Gnome"
  - "The Sage"
  - "The Hut of Baba Yaga"
  - "The Curse of Baba Yaga" (introduction)
  - "The Hut of Baba Yaga"
  - "The Great Gates of Kiev"
4. "Fanfare for the Common Man/Drum Solo/Rondo"

There seems to be some confusion as to what the album, by this title, is. There is also another album by ELP by this title that is a compilation of studio tracks. The track list for the IMPORT studio recording compilation is:

Disc one

1. "Tarkus"
2. "Pictures at an Exhibition"
3. "Nut Rocker"

Disc two

1. "Touch and Go"
2. "The Barbarian"
3. "Fanfare for the Common Man"
4. "Lucky Man"
5. "Take a Pebble"

Sanctuary/Universal Item 2743614 UPC: 0602527436142

== Personnel ==
=== Band members ===
- Keith Emerson - keyboards
- Greg Lake - bass, guitars, vocals
- Carl Palmer - percussion, drums
