= King Biscuit Flower Hour: Greatest Hits Live =

Live album by Emerson, Lake & Palmer
- Released: 1997
- Recorded: 1973–74, 1977
- Genre: Progressive rock
- Length: 101:51
- Label: King Biscuit Entertainment
- Producer: Greg Lake

Emerson, Lake & Palmer chronology
In the Hot Seat (1994)	King Biscuit Flower Hour: Greatest Hits Live (1997)	Live in Poland (1997)

Professional ratings
Review scores
Source	Rating
AllMusic	4/5 stars

King Biscuit Flower Hour: Greatest Hits Live is a compilation live album by the progressive rock supergroup Emerson, Lake & Palmer. It features tracks from two different tours: The 1973–1974 Brain Salad Surgery Tour, and the 1977 Works Tour.

Tracks 1–10 on Disc One were recorded on November 12, 1977, at the Coliseum (now the WesBanco Arena) in Wheeling, West Virginia. This is the first (and possibly only) official release of these recordings. The band's last concert with an orchestra on the 1977 Works Tour was at Olympic Stadium in Montreal on August 26 and they performed the rest of the tour as a trio, which is the ensemble featured here.

Tracks 11–14 on Disc One and Track 1 on Disc Two were recorded on 7 March 1974 at the Civic Center in Tulsa, Oklahoma.

== Track listing ==
Disc one

1. "Peter Gunn Theme" (Henry Mancini) – 3:43
2. "Tiger in a Spotlight" (Emerson, Greg Lake, Palmer, Peter Sinfield) – 4:22
3. "C'est la Vie" (Lake, Sinfield) – 4:21
4. "Piano Improvisation" (Emerson) – 5:39
  - Piano Concerto No. 1, 1st Movement: Allegro Giojoso
5. "Maple Leaf Rag" (Scott Joplin) – 1:17
6. "Drum Solo" (Palmer) – 1:25
7. "The Enemy God Dances with the Black Spirits" (Sergei Prokofiev, arr. by Emerson, Lake, Palmer) – 2:45
8. "Watching Over You" (Lake, Sinfield) – 4:13
9. "Pirates" (Emerson, Lake, Palmer) – 13:27
10. "Fanfare for the Common Man" (Aaron Copland, arr. by Emerson, Lake, Palmer) – 8:20
11. "Hoedown" (Copland) – 4:23
12. "Still...You Turn Me On" (Lake) – 3:01
13. "Lucky Man" (Lake) – 3:09
14. "Piano Improvisation" (Emerson, Friedrich Gulda) – 7:09

Disc two

1. "Karn Evil 9" (Emerson, Lake, Sinfield) – 34:31
2. "Fully Interactive" – 36:01
- Track 2 is a multimedia track containing the songs 'From the Beginning', 'Lucky Man' and 'Paper Blood'.
