= Live at Nassau Coliseum '78 =

Live album by Emerson, Lake & Palmer
- Released: 22 February 2011
- Recorded: 9 February 1978 at the Nassau Veterans Memorial Coliseum in Uniondale, New York
- Genre: Progressive rock
- Length: 107:30
- Label: Shout! Factory

Emerson, Lake & Palmer chronology
A Time and a Place (2010)	Live at Nassau Coliseum '78 (2011)	Live at the Mar Y Sol Festival '72 (2011)

Professional ratings
Review scores
Source	Rating
AllMusic	4/5 stars

Live at Nassau Coliseum '78 is a double live album by British progressive rock band Emerson, Lake & Palmer, released in 2011.

The live concert recording was recorded at the Nassau Veterans Memorial Coliseum in Uniondale, New York on February 9, 1978, and was remastered from original analog tapes for this release. Prior to this release, only bootleg recordings of this concert were available.

== Track listing ==
Disc 1

1. "Hoedown"
2. "Tarkus"
  - "Eruption"
  - "Stones of Years"
  - "Iconoclast"
  - "Mass"
  - "Aquatarkus"
3. "Take a Pebble"
4. "Piano Concerto, No. 1 - First Movement: Allegro Giojoso"
5. "Maple Leaf Rag"
6. "Take a Pebble (Reprise)"
7. "C'est La Vie"
8. "Lucky Man"
9. "Pictures at an Exhibition"

Disc 2

1. "Tiger in a Spotlight"
2. "Watching Over You"
3. "Tank"
4. "Drum Solo"
5. "The Enemy God Dances with the Black Spirits"
6. "Nut Rocker"
7. "Pirates"
8. "Fanfare for the Common Man"

== Personnel ==
=== Band members ===
- Keith Emerson - keyboards
- Greg Lake - bass, guitars, vocals
- Carl Palmer - percussion, drums

=== Production ===
- Producer (Archival Material Production), Supervised By – David Skye
- Remastered by Randy Wine at MoonWine Studios
- Tape Transfer: Rodney Pearson
- Photos: Ken Jackson - ClassicRockConcertPhotos.com
- Art Direction & Package Design: Lisa Glines
