= Then and Now (Emerson, Lake & Palmer album) =

Live album by Emerson, Lake & Palmer
- Released: 24 November 1998
- Recorded: Ontario, CA 6 April 1974 & world tour 1997-1998
- Genre: Progressive rock
- Length: 2:06:36
- Label: Eagle 1998 - Sanctuary Midline 2006
- Producer: Keith Wechsler

Emerson, Lake & Palmer chronology
Live at the Isle of Wight (1997)	Then and Now (1998)

Professional ratings
Review scores
Source	Rating
Allmusic	3/5 stars

Then and Now is a live album by British progressive rock band Emerson, Lake & Palmer, released in 1998.

It brings together two separate periods of the band's career and places them back-to-back. First is the legendary California Jam performance (the "Then"), which took place at the Ontario Motor Speedway in Ontario, California on 6 April 1974. Second a collection of recordings from the 1997 to 1998 reunion tour (the "Now").

Most of the band's best-known pieces are present, with "Karn Evil 9: First Impression, Part 2", "Take a Pebble" and "Lucky Man" appearing twice, as part of each period's set lists.

Notable inclusions are "A Time and a Place" from Tarkus, which was rarely performed live prior to the 1998 tour, and an abbreviated version of King Crimson's "21st Century Schizoid Man", in the arrangement Emerson, Lake & Palmer recorded for The Return of the Manticore in 1993.

== Track listing ==
Disc 1

(Then - Cal Jam '74):

1. "Toccata" (Alberto Ginastera, arr. by Keith Emerson) – 3:36
2. "Take a Pebble Excerpts:" – 18:21
  1. "Still...You Turn Me On" (Greg Lake)
  2. "Lucky Man" (Lake)
  3. "Piano Improvisations"
    1. "Fugue" (Emerson, Friedrich Gulda)
    2. "Little Rock Getaway" (Joe Sullivan)
3. "Karn Evil 9:" – 19:36
  1. "1st Impression, Pt. 2" (Emerson, Lake)
  2. "3rd Impression" (Emerson, Lake)

(Now - Tour '97/'98):

1. "A Time and a Place" (Emerson, Lake, Carl Palmer) – 4:06
2. "Piano Concerto No. 1, Third Movement: Toccata con Fuoco" (Emerson) – 4:51
3. "From the Beginning" (Lake) – 4:14

Disc 2

(Now - Tour '97/'98 continued):

1. "Karn Evil 9: 1st Impression, Pt. 2" (Emerson, Lake) – 5:22
2. "Tiger in a Spotlight" (Emerson, Lake, Palmer, Peter Sinfield) – 3:36
3. "Hoedown" (Aaron Copland) – 4:55
4. "Touch and Go" (Emerson, Lake) – 4:13
5. "Knife-Edge" (Emerson, Richard Fraser, Leoš Janáček, Lake) – 6:11
6. "Bitches Crystal" (Emerson, Lake) – 4:30
7. "Honky Tonk Train Blues" (Meade "Lux" Lewis) – 3:41
8. "Take a Pebble" (Lake) – 7:09
9. "Lucky Man" (Lake) – 5:05
10. "Fanfare for the Common Man/Rondo" (Dave Brubeck, Copland, arr. Emerson, Lake, Palmer) – 22:10
11. "21st Century Schizoid Man/America" (Robert Fripp, Michael Giles, Lake, Ian McDonald, Sinfield, Leonard Bernstein, Stephen Sondheim) – 4:53

== Personnel ==
=== Band members ===
- Keith Emerson – keyboards, Hammond organ, Yamaha GX-1, Modular Moog, Minimoog, classical piano, upright piano, electric piano, clavinet, Moog Lyra, Moog Apollo
- Greg Lake – bass, electric and acoustic guitars, vocals
- Carl Palmer – drums, electronic and acoustic percussions, gongs, tubular bells

== Release details ==
- 1998, UK, Eagle EDGCD040, Release date 24 November 1998, CD
- 2006, UK, Sanctuary SMDDD343, Release date 5 June 2006, CD
- 2006, UK, Demon Music Group LTD MCDLX036, renamed Pomp And Ceremony Live 2006, CD
