= Live at the Mar y Sol Festival '72 =

Live album by Emerson, Lake & Palmer
- Released: 6 December 2011
- Recorded: 2 April 1972 at the Mar y Sol festival, Manatí, Puerto Rico
- Genre: Progressive rock
- Length: 77:30
- Label: Shout! Factory

Emerson, Lake & Palmer chronology
Live at Nassau Coliseum '78 (2011)	Live at the Mar y Sol Festival '72 (2011)	Live in California 1974 (2012)

Professional ratings
Review scores
Source	Rating
AllMusic	4/5 stars

Live at the Mar y Sol Festival '72 is a live album by British progressive rock band Emerson, Lake & Palmer, released in 2011. It was recorded on 2 April 1972 at the Mar y Sol Pop Festival in Puerto Rico.

== Release ==
Previously available only on the 5CD+1DVD box-set From the Beginning (released in September 2007), this album was re-mastered from the original multitrack tapes.

== Festival location ==
Although the CD booklet states that this performance took place in "Vega Baja, San Juan", this is a production error. It should have been simply written "Vega Baja" for Vega Baja and San Juan are two distinctive municipalities of Puerto Rico. There are four towns between Vega Baja and San Juan. Actually, the municipality of San Juan is the capital of Puerto Rico. Moreover, the festival actually took place in the municipality of Manatí which is very close to the borderline with Vega Baja. Back in those days, everybody mistakenly knew the festival area as being inside Vega Baja instead of Manatí. Approximately a decade later, this mistake was corrected.

== Track listing ==
1. "Hoedown" (Copland, arr. by Emerson, Lake, Palmer) – 4:18
2. "Tarkus" – 22:33
  a) "Eruption" (Emerson)
  b) "Stones of Years" (Emerson, Lake)
  c) "Iconoclast" (Emerson)
  d) "Mass" (Emerson, Lake)
  e) "Manticore" (Emerson)
  f) "Battlefield" (Lake)
  g) "Aquatarkus" (Emerson)
3. "Take a Pebble" (Lake) – 4:36
4. "Lucky Man" (Lake) – 3:00
5. "Piano Improvisation – 'Take a Pebble' conclusion" (Emerson / Lake) – 9:44
6. "Pictures at an Exhibition" – 14:39
  a) "Promenade" (Modest Mussorgsky, Emerson)
  b) "The Hut of Baba Yaga" (Mussorgsky, Emerson)
  c) "The Curse of Baba Yaga" (Emerson, Lake, Palmer)
  d) "The Hut of Baba Yaga" (Mussorgsky, Emerson)
  e) "The Great Gates of Kiev" (Emerson, Lake)
7. "Rondo" (Brubeck, arr. by Emerson) – 18:29

== Personnel ==
=== Band members ===
- Keith Emerson – keyboards
- Greg Lake – guitars, bass, vocals
- Carl Palmer – percussion, drums

=== Production ===
- Archival Material Production & Supervision by David Skye
- Remastered by Randy Wine at Randy Wine Studios
- Mar y Sol Festival memorabilia images: Reniet Ramirez of marysol-festival.com (uncredited on CD)
- Art Direction & Package Design: Lisa Glines
- Project Assistance: Tony Ortiz
