= The Original Bootleg Series from the Manticore Vaults =

Live album series by Emerson, Lake & Palmer
- Released: 2001, 2002, 2006
- Genre: Progressive rock
- Label: Castle

Volume One
Review scores
Source	Rating
AllMusic	4/5 stars

Volume Two
Review scores
Source	Rating
AllMusic	4/5 stars

Volume Three
Review scores
Source	Rating
AllMusic	3.5/5 stars

The Original Bootleg Series from the Manticore Vaults is a four-volume "official bootleg" release by Emerson, Lake & Palmer on Castle Records containing live recordings. Each of the four volumes comprised four shows and contained seven or eight CDs. A two disc set of highlights from the first two volumes was released under the name Best of the Bootlegs in 2002.

== Volume One ==
Discs 1 & 2: "Stomping Encore" Gaelic Park, Riverdale, Bronx, New York, 1 September 1971
No.	Title	Writer(s)	Length
1.	"The Barbarian"	Keith Emerson, Greg Lake, Béla Bartók	5:37
2.	"Take a Pebble" (including "Piano Improvisation" (Emerson))	Lake	20:07
3.	"Tarkus"	Emerson, Lake	25:31
4.	"Knife-Edge"	Emerson, Richard Fraser, Leoš Janáček, J. S. Bach, Lake	7:08
5.	"Rondo"	Dave Brubeck, arr. by Emerson	18:47
6.	"Piano Interlude"	Emerson	1:23
7.	"Hoedown"	Aaron Copland, arr. by Emerson, Lake, Carl Palmer	4:32

Discs 3 & 4: Louisville Town Hall, Louisville, Kentucky, 21 April 1972
No.	Title	Writer(s)	Length
1.	"Hoedown"	Copland, arr. by Emerson, Lake, Palmer	4:06
2.	"Tarkus"	Emerson, Lake	25:53
3.	"Take a Pebble"	Lake	5:00
4.	"Lucky Man"	Lake	3:06
5.	"Piano Improvisation" (including "Take a Pebble Conclusion" (Lake))	Emerson	11:14
6.	"Abaddon's Bolero"	Emerson	8:39
7.	"Pictures at an Exhibition"	Modest Mussorgsky, arr. by Emerson, Lake, Palmer	15:41
8.	"Nut Rocker"	Kim Fowley, Pyotr Ilyich Tchaikovsky, arr. by Emerson, Lake, Palmer	3:44
9.	"Rondo"	Brubeck, arr. by Emerson	22:34

Discs 5 & 6: Long Beach Arena, Long Beach, California, 28 July 1972
No.	Title	Writer(s)	Length
1.	"Tarkus"	Emerson, Lake	26:46
2.	"The Endless Enigma"	Emerson, Lake	8:34
3.	"The Sheriff"	Emerson, Lake	3:23
4.	"Take a Pebble/Lucky Man"	Lake	8:22
5.	"Take a Pebble (Reprise)" (including "Piano Improvisation" (Emerson))	Lake	10:22
6.	"Pictures at an Exhibition"	Mussorgsky, arr. by Emerson, Lake, Palmer	16:51
7.	"Hoedown"	Copland, arr. by Emerson, Lake, Palmer	3:49
8.	"Rondo"	Brubeck, arr. by Emerson	19:51

Disc 7: Saratoga Performing Arts Center, Saratoga Springs, New York, 13 August 1972
No.	Title	Writer(s)	Length
1.	"Hoedown"	Copland, arr. by Emerson, Lake, Palmer	4:12
2.	"Tarkus"	Emerson, Lake	22:53
3.	"The Endless Enigma"	Emerson, Lake	9:12
4.	"The Sheriff"	Emerson, Lake	3:24
5.	"Take a Pebble" (including "Lucky Man" (Lake) and "Piano Improvisation" (Emerson))	Lake	21:13
6.	"Pictures at an Exhibition"	Mussorgsky, arr. by Emerson, Lake, Palmer	15:18

== Volume Two ==
Discs 1 & 2: Hammersmith Odeon, London, 26 November 1972
No.	Title	Writer(s)	Length
1.	"Hoedown"	Copland, arr. by Emerson, Lake, Palmer	4:14
2.	"Tarkus"	Emerson, Lake	25:20
3.	"The Endless Enigma"	Emerson, Lake	8:46
4.	"At the Sign of the Swinging Cymbal"	Brian Fahey	0:55
5.	"The Sheriff"	Emerson, Lake	3:57
6.	"Take a Pebble"	Lake	6:23
7.	"Lucky Man"	Lake	3:15
8.	"Piano Improvisation" (including "Take a Pebble Conclusion" (Lake))	Emerson	12:18
9.	"Pictures at an Exhibition"	Mussorgsky, arr. by Emerson, Lake, Palmer	16:53
10.	"Nut Rocker"	Fowley, Tchaikovsky, arr. by Emerson, Lake, Palmer	18:15

Discs 3 & 4: Henry Levitt Arena, (Note: Misnamed "Henry Lewitt Arena" in packaging) Wichita, Kansas, 26 March 1974
No.	Title	Writer(s)	Length
1.	"Hoedown"	Copland, arr. by Emerson, Lake, Palmer	3:41
2.	"Jerusalem"	William Blake, Hubert Parry, arr. by Emerson, Lake, Palmer	2:53
3.	"Toccata"	Alberto Ginastera, arr. Emerson	7:25
4.	"Tarkus"	Emerson, Lake	30:44
5.	"Benny the Bouncer"	Emerson, Lake, Peter Sinfield	2:17
6.	"Jeremy Bender"	Emerson, Lake	4:13
7.	"Take a Pebble"	Lake	5:43
8.	"Still...You Turn Me On"	Lake	3:08
9.	"Lucky Man"	Lake	2:46
10.	"Piano Improvisation"	Emerson	14:49
11.	"Take a Pebble (Conclusion)"	Lake	3:13
12.	"Karn Evil 9: First Impression"	Emerson, Lake	21:49
13.	"Karn Evil 9: Second Impression"	Emerson	4:34
14.	"Karn Evil 9: Third Impression"	Emerson, Lake, Sinfield	10:25

Discs 5 & 6: Rich Stadium, Buffalo, New York, 26 July 1974
No.	Title	Writer(s)	Length
1.	"Hoedown"	Copland, arr. by Emerson, Lake, Palmer	4:02
2.	"Jerusalem"	Blake, Parry, arr. by Emerson, Lake, Palmer	3:08
3.	"Toccata"	Ginastera, arr. Emerson	7:48
4.	"Tarkus"	Emerson, Lake	30:38
5.	"Take a Pebble"	Lake	4:40
6.	"Still...You Turn Me On"	Lake	3:02
7.	"Lucky Man"	Lake	3:03
8.	"Piano Improvisation"	Emerson	11:51
9.	"Take a Pebble (Conclusion)"	Lake	2:38
10.	"Karn Evil 9: First Impression"	Emerson, Lake	18:22
11.	"Karn Evil 9: Second Impression" (incomplete recording)	Emerson	4:02
12.	"Karn Evil 9: Third Impression"	Emerson, Lake, Sinfield	9:34
13.	"Pictures at an Exhibition"	Mussorgsky, arr. by Emerson, Lake, Palmer	24:06

Discs 7 & 8: New Haven Civic Centre, New Haven, Connecticut, 30 November 1977
No.	Title	Writer(s)	Length
1.	"Peter Gunn"	Henry Mancini, arr. by Emerson, Lake, Palmer	3:15
2.	"Hoedown"	Copland, arr. by Emerson, Lake, Palmer	4:11
3.	"Tarkus"	Emerson, Lake	17:47
4.	"Take a Pebble"	Lake	3:11
5.	"Piano Concerto No. 1, First Movement"	Emerson	5:00
6.	"Maple Leaf Rag"	Scott Joplin	1:13
7.	"Take a Pebble (Conclusion)"	Lake	2:52
8.	"C'est la Vie"	Lake, Sinfield	4:16
9.	"Lucky Man" (incomplete recording)	Lake	2:28
10.	"Karn Evil 9: First Impression, Pt. 2"	Emerson, Lake	4:30
11.	"Tiger in a Spotlight"	Emerson, Lake, Palmer, Sinfield	4:30
12.	"Watching Over You"	Lake, Sinfield	4:10
13.	"Nut Rocker"	Fowley, Tchaikovsky, arr. by Emerson, Lake, Palmer	3:30
14.	"Pirates"	Emerson, Lake, Sinfield	13:07
15.	"Fanfare for the Common Man"	Copland, arr. Emerson, Lake, Palmer	14:37

== Volume Three ==
Disc One: Anaheim Convention Center, California, 10 February 1974 and Wheeling Colosseum 1977
No.	Title	Writer(s)	Length
1.	"Hoedown"	Copland, arr. by Emerson, Lake, Palmer	4:18
2.	"Tiger in a Spotlight"	Emerson, Lake, Palmer, Sinfield	4:14
3.	"C'est la Vie"	Lake, Sinfield	4:16
4.	"Still...You Turn Me On"	Lake	3:10
5.	"Lucky Man"	Lake	2:42
6.	"Tank/The Enemy God Dances with the Black Spirits"	Palmer, Sergei Prokofiev, arr. by Emerson, Lake, Palmer	2:59
7.	"Karn Evil 9: First Impression"	Emerson, Lake	4:48
8.	"Karn Evil 9: Second Impression"	Emerson	9:58
9.	"Fanfare for the Common Man"	Copland, arr. by Emerson, Lake, Palmer	8:08
10.	"Take a Pebble"	Lake	6:28
11.	"Pictures at an Exhibition"	Mussorgsky, arr. by Emerson, Lake, Palmer	9:03

Discs 2 & 3: Royal Albert Hall, London, England, 2 October 1992
No.	Title	Writer(s)	Length
1.	"Tarkus"	Emerson, Lake	9:36
2.	"Knife-Edge"	Emerson, Fraser, Janáček, Bach, Lake	5:55
3.	"Paper Blood"	Emerson, Lake, Palmer	4:17
4.	"Black Moon"	Emerson, Lake, Palmer	6:50
5.	"Close to Home"	Emerson	4:15
6.	"Creole Dance"	Ginastera	3:20
7.	"From the Beginning"	Lake	3:02
8.	"Still...You Turn Me On"	Lake	4:09
9.	"Lucky Man"	Lake	4:48
10.	"Honky Tonk Train Blues"	Meade "Lux" Lewis	3:58
11.	"Romeo and Juliet"	Prokofiev	3:37
12.	"Pirates"	Emerson, Lake, Sinfield	13:41
13.	"Pictures at an Exhibition"	Mussorgsky, arr. by Emerson, Lake, Palmer	10:41
14.	"Fanfare for the Common Man"	Copland, arr. by Emerson, Lake, Palmer	14:43

Discs 4 & 5: Wiltern Theater, Los Angeles, California, March 1993
No.	Title	Writer(s)	Length
1.	"Karn Evil 9: 1st Impression, Pt. 2"	Emerson, Lake	1:18
2.	"Tarkus: Eruption"	Emerson	2:22
3.	"Tarkus: Stones of Years"	Emerson, Lake	4:36
4.	"Tarkus: Iconoclast"	Emerson	1:52
5.	"Knife-Edge"	Emerson, Fraser, Janáček, Bach, Lake	5:43
6.	"Paper Blood"	Emerson, Lake, Palmer	4:11
7.	"Black Moon"	Emerson, Lake, Palmer	4:55
8.	"Close to Home"	Emerson	3:54
9.	"Creole Dance"	Ginastera	4:24
10.	"Still...You Turn Me On"	Lake	3:52
11.	"C'est la Vie"	Lake, Sinfield	5:08
12.	"Lucky Man"	Lake	4:49
13.	"Honky Tonk Train Blues"	Lewis	2:02
14.	"Touch and Go"	Emerson, Lake	3:06
15.	"Pirates"	Emerson, Lake, Sinfield	14:50
16.	"Hoedown"	Copland, arr. by Emerson, Lake, Palmer	3:48
17.	"Promenade"	Mussorgsky, arr. by Emerson	1:40
18.	"The Gnome"	Mussorgsky, Palmer	2:11
19.	"Promenade"	Mussorgsky, Lake	1:38
20.	"The Hut of Baba Yaga"	Mussorgsky, arr. by Emerson	1:24
21.	"Carl Palmer Solo"	Palmer	8:01
22.	"The Great Gates of Kiev"	Mussorgsky, Lake	7:06
23.	"Fanfare for the Common Man"	Copland, arr. by Emerson, Lake, Palmer	17:34

== Volume Four ==
Discs 1 & 2: Hartford Civic Center, Connecticut, 10 July 1977
No.	Title	Writer(s)	Length
1.	"Karn Evil 9: 1st Impression, Pt. 2"	Emerson, Lake	4:37
2.	"Hoedown"	Copland, arr. by Emerson, Lake, Palmer	4:12
3.	"Tarkus"	Emerson, Lake	16:24
4.	"Take a Pebble" (including "Piano Concerto No. 1, 1st Movement" (Emerson))	Lake	10:54
5.	"Still...You Turn Me On"	Lake	4:12
6.	"Knife-Edge"	Emerson, Fraser, Janáček, Bach, Lake	5:23
7.	"Pictures at an Exhibition"	Mussorgsky, arr. by Emerson, Lake, Palmer	15:54
8.	"C’est la Vie"	Lake, Sinfield	4:23
9.	"Lucky Man"	Lake	2:19
10.	"Tank"	Emerson, Palmer	9:58
11.	"Nut Rocker"	Fowley, Tchaikovsky, arr. by Emerson, Lake, Palmer	3:35
12.	"Pirates"	Emerson, Lake, Sinfield	13:13
13.	"Fanfare for the Common Man"	Copland, arr. Emerson, Lake, Palmer	15:03

Discs 3 & 4: Chicago 1978
No.	Title	Writer(s)	Length
1.	"Peter Gunn"	Mancini, arr. by Emerson, Lake, Palmer	4:11
2.	"Hoedown"	Copland, arr. by Emerson, Lake, Palmer	4:12
3.	"Tarkus"	Emerson, Lake	17:03
4.	"Take a Pebble" (including "Piano Concerto No.1, 3rd Movement" (Emerson) and "Maple Leaf Rag" (Joplin))	Lake	13:03
5.	"C'est la Vie"	Lake, Sinfield	4:24
6.	"Lucky Man"	Lake	3:08
7.	"Pictures at an Exhibition"	Mussorgsky, arr. by Emerson, Lake, Palmer	15:48
8.	"Karn Evil 9: 1st Impression, Pt. 2"	Emerson, Lake	5:05
9.	"Tiger in a Spotlight"	Emerson, Lake, Palmer, Sinfield	4:11
10.	"Watching Over You"	Lake, Sinfield	4:27
11.	"Tank/The Enemy God Dances with the Black Spirits"	Palmer, Prokofiev, arr. by Emerson, Lake, Palmer	13:14
12.	"Nut Rocker"	Fowley, Tchaikovsky, arr. by Emerson, Lake, Palmer	3:52
13.	"Pirates"	Emerson, Lake, Sinfield	13:12
14.	"Fanfare for the Common Man/Rondo"	Brubeck, Copland, arr. by Emerson, Lake, Palmer	16:02
15.	"Show Me the Way to Go Home"	L. James Campbell, Reginald Connelly	4:09

Discs 5 & 6: Pennsylvania, 22 July 1992
No.	Title	Writer(s)	Length
1.	"Fanfare for the Common Man"	Copland, arr. by Emerson, Lake, Palmer	7:06
2.	"Karn Evil 9: 1st Impression, Pt. 2"	Emerson, Lake	1:25
3.	"Tarkus"	Emerson, Lake	8:24
4.	"Knife-Edge"	Emerson, Fraser, Janáček, Bach, Lake	5:34
5.	"Paper Blood"	Emerson, Lake, Palmer	4:42
6.	"Black Moon"	Emerson, Lake, Palmer	6:44
7.	"Creole Dance"	Ginastera	2:55
8.	"Close to Home"	Emerson	3:19
9.	"Affairs of the Heart"	Geoff Downes, Lake	4:08
10.	"From the Beginning"	Lake	3:45
11.	"Romeo and Juliet"	Prokofiev	9:07
12.	"Greg Plays"		0:59
13.	"Farewell to Arms"	Emerson, Lake	5:43
14.	"Pirates"	Emerson, Lake, Sinfield	13:54
15.	"Lucky Man"	Lake	5:01
16.	"Pictures at an Exhibition"	Mussorgsky, arr. by Emerson, Lake, Palmer	18:40
17.	"Medley: Changing States/America/Rondo"	Emerson, Bernstein, Brubeck, arr. by Emerson	8:21
18.	"Another Frontier"	Emerson	6:23

Discs 7 & 8: Jones Beach, New York, 25 July 1992
No.	Title	Writer(s)	Length
1.	"Karn Evil 9: 1st Impression, Pt. 2"	Emerson, Lake	1:49
2.	"Tarkus"	Emerson, Lake	9:16
3.	"Knife-Edge"	Emerson, Fraser, Janáček, Bach, Lake	5:51
4.	"Paper Blood"	Emerson, Lake, Palmer	4:41
5.	"Black Moon"	Emerson, Lake, Palmer	7:03
6.	"Creole Dance"	Ginastera	4:15
7.	"Piano Instrumental"	Emerson	4:02
8.	"From the Beginning"	Lake	2:59
9.	"Affairs of the Heart"	Downes, Lake	4:12
10.	"Romeo and Juliet"	Prokofiev	3:55
11.	"Farewell to Arms"	Emerson, Lake	6:01
12.	"Pirates"	Emerson, Lake, Sinfield	14:09
13.	"Lucky Man"	Lake	5:10
14.	"Pictures at an Exhibition"	Mussorgsky, arr. by Emerson, Lake, Palmer	18:25
15.	"Fanfare for the Common Man"	Copland, arr. Emerson, Lake, Palmer	13:28

== Best of the Bootlegs ==
Disc One
No.	Title	Writer(s)	Length
1.	"Hoedown" (from Volume 1 – Saratoga)	Copland, arr. Emerson, Lake, Palmer	4:03
2.	"Knife-Edge" (from Volume 1 – Gaelic Park)	Emerson, Lake	7:09
3.	"Pictures at an Exhibition" (from Volume 1 – Long Beach)	Mussorgsky, arr. by Emerson, Lake, Palmer	16:55
4.	"Take a Pebble/Lucky Man" (from Volume 1 – Long Beach)	Lake	8:23
5.	"Tarkus" (from Volume 1 – Louisville)	Emerson, Lake	25:18
6.	"The Endless Enigma" (from Volume 1 – Saratoga)	Emerson, Lake	9:05
7.	"Nut Rocker" (from Volume 1 – Louisville)	Fowley, Tchaikovsky, arr. by Emerson, Lake, Palmer	3:51

Disc Two
No.	Title	Writer(s)	Length
1.	"Jerusalem" (from Volume 2 – Wichita)	Blake, Parry, arr. by Emerson, Lake, Palmer	2:54
2.	"Pirates" (from Volume 2 – New Haven)	Emerson, Lake, Sinfield	13:07
3.	"Karn Evil 9: First Impression" (from Volume 2 – Wichita)	Emerson, Lake	21:50
4.	"Still...You Turn Me On" (from Volume 2 – Buffalo)	Lake	3:04
5.	"The Barbarian" (from Volume 1 – Gaelic Park)	Emerson, Lake, Bartók	5:20
6.	"C'est la Vie" (from Volume 2 – New Haven)	Lake, Sinfield	4:15
7.	"Fanfare for the Common Man" (from Volume 2 – New Haven)	Copland, arr. Emerson, Lake, Palmer	14:37
