= Welcome Back My Friends to the Show That Never Ends – Ladies and Gentlemen =

Live album by Emerson, Lake & Palmer
- Released: August 1974
- Recorded: 10 February 1974
- Venue: Anaheim Convention Centre (Anaheim)
- Studio: Wally Heider Recording Mobile
- Genre: Progressive rock
- Length: 109:41
- Label: Manticore
- Producer: Greg Lake

Emerson, Lake & Palmer chronology
Brain Salad Surgery (1973)	Welcome Back My Friends to the Show That Never Ends – Ladies and Gentlemen (1974)	Works Volume 1 (1977)

Emerson, Lake & Palmer live chronology
Pictures at an Exhibition (1971)	Welcome Back My Friends to the Show That Never Ends – Ladies and Gentlemen (1974)	Emerson, Lake & Palmer in Concert (1979)

Welcome Back, My Friends, to the Show That Never Ends – Ladies and Gentlemen is the second live album by the English progressive rock band Emerson, Lake & Palmer, released as a triple album in August 1974 on Manticore Records. It was recorded in February 1974 at the Anaheim Convention Center in Anaheim, California, during the group's 1973–74 world tour in support of their fourth studio album, Brain Salad Surgery (1973).

The album was a commercial success, reaching number 4 on the Billboard 200, the band's highest-charting album in the US. In the UK, the album peaked at number 6. The album is certified gold by the Recording Industry Association of America (RIAA) for 500,000 copies sold in the US. Following its release, Emerson, Lake & Palmer took an extended break from writing and recording.

== Recording ==
The album was recorded in February 1974 at the Anaheim Convention Center in Anaheim, California during the group's 1973–74 world tour in support of their fourth studio album, Brain Salad Surgery (1973). Its title comes from the introduction to the show spoken by the show's Master of Ceremonies (UK disc jockey Pete Murray) and the opening line of "Karn Evil 9: First Impression, Part 2".

To record the album, staff and equipment were brought in from Wally Heider Recording in Hollywood, including a 24-track mobile recording and a 40-input mixing console. Peter Granet, one of the engineers, called it "the finest recording experience I've ever had".

The band also used a 4-channel quadraphonic PA system on the tour. A quad mix of the album was released as a three 8-track tape set. A quad LP record edition was also planned using the Compatible Discrete 4 process, but this was scrapped because JVC, the manufacturer, was unable to cut a stable LP master to meet the format's specifications.

Most of the recordings on the album were first used for broadcast on the American rock music radio show The King Biscuit Flower Hour. In 1999 these radio recordings were also released on CD.

== Songs ==
All but one of the tracks from the band's most recent album Brain Salad Surgery appear in versions nearly unchanged from their studio renditions, save for the insertion of a five-minute Palmer drum solo to climax "Karn Evil 9: 1st Impression" and a stripped-down rendition of the Lake ballad "Still...You Turn Me On" which appears along with an equally downsized "Lucky Man" in the middle of Lake's acoustic solo spot during an extended "Take a Pebble".

The "Tarkus" suite is the most transformed from its original 1971 recording, thanks to extended keyboard solos on "Stones of Years" and "Mass", the insertion of an excerpt from King Crimson's "Epitaph" at the close of "Battlefield", and a greatly extended rendition of "Aquatarkus" which features a lengthy quote from Dick Hyman's 1969 Moog novelty single "The Minotaur". Only two tracks from Trilogy, "The Sheriff" and "Hoedown", featured since the group had previously encountered great difficulty in reproducing other songs from the album without the use of extensive overdubs; the synth work on "Hoedown" is considerably more advanced than that of the studio original, while "The Sheriff" is played as part of a medley with "Jeremy Bender".

The only songs played on the 1973-4 tour which did not make it onto the album were the primary encore "Pictures at an Exhibition" (due to its already having been their first live release) and the occasional second encore "Rondo", a live version of which had highlighted The Nice's self-titled third album.

== Reception ==
Professional ratings
Review scores
Source	Rating
AllMusic	3/5 stars
MusicHound Rock	2/5 stars

AllMusic gave the album a mixed retrospective review, saying that it "makes one realise how accomplished these musicians were, and how well they worked together when the going was good." They praised the set for including all but one song from Brain Salad Surgery, and particularly commended the performance of "Karn Evil 9" as being far superior to the studio rendition. However, they noted that unlike most live albums of the era, Welcome Back did not incorporate studio overdubs, limiting the band's ability to recreate moments from their albums and resulting in poor sound quality: "Even the most recent remastered editions could not fix the feedback, the occasionally leakages, the echo, the seeming distance – the listener often gets the impression of being seated in the upper mezzanine of an arena."

== Track listing ==
=== Original vinyl release ===
Side one
No.	Title	Writer(s)	Length
1.	"Hoedown"	Aaron Copland, arranged by Keith Emerson, Greg Lake, and Carl Palmer	4:27
2.	"Jerusalem"	Sir Charles Hubert Hastings Parry, William Blake; arr. Emerson, Lake, and Palmer	3:20
3.	"Toccata" (an adaptation of Ginastera's 1st piano concerto, 4th movement)	Alberto Ginastera; arr. Emerson	7:21

Side two
No.	Title	Writer(s)	Length
4.	"Tarkus": 1. "Eruption"; 2. "Stones of Years"; 3. "Iconoclast"; 4. "Mass"; 5. "Manticore"; 6. "Battlefield" / "Epitaph"	Emerson, Lake: Emerson; Emerson, Lake; Emerson; Emerson, Lake; Emerson; Lake; Emerson / Lake, Robert Fripp, Ian McDonald, Michael Giles, Peter Sinfield	16:42

Side three
No.	Title	Writer(s)	Length
5.	"Tarkus (Conclusion)": 7. "Aquatarkus"	Emerson: Emerson	10:42
6.	"Take a Pebble" (including "Still...You Turn Me On" / "Lucky Man")	Lake	11:06

Side four
No.	Title	Writer(s)	Length
7.	"Piano Improvisations" (including Friedrich Gulda's "Fugue" and Joe Sullivan's "Little Rock Getaway")	Emerson	11:54
8.	"Take a Pebble (Conclusion)"	Lake	3:14
9.	"Jeremy Bender" / "The Sheriff"	Emerson, Lake	5:26

Side five
No.	Title	Writer(s)	Length
10.	"Karn Evil 9: 1st Impression" (including "Percussion Solo (Con Brio)")	Emerson, Lake, Palmer	17:26

Side six
No.	Title	Writer(s)	Length
11.	"Karn Evil 9: 2nd Impression"	Emerson	7:36
12.	"Karn Evil 9: 3rd Impression"	Emerson, Lake, Sinfield	10:17
Total length:			109:41

=== CD reissue ===
Disc one
No.	Title	Length
1.	"Hoedown"	4:27
2.	"Jerusalem"	3:20
3.	"Toccata"	7:21
4.	"Tarkus": 1. "Eruption"; 2. "Stones of Years"; 3. "Iconoclast"; 4. "Mass"; 5. "Manticore"; 6. "Battlefield"; 7. "Aquatarkus"	27:24
5.	"Take a Pebble (including "Still...You Turn Me On" and "Lucky Man")"	11:06

Disc two
No.	Title	Length
1.	"Piano Improvisations"	11:54
2.	"Take a Pebble (Conclusion)"	3:14
3.	"Jeremy Bender / The Sheriff"	5:26
4.	"Karn Evil 9": 1. "Karn Evil 9: 1st Impression"; 2. "Karn Evil 9: 2nd Impression"; 3. "Karn Evil 9: 3rd Impression"	35:21

== Personnel ==
Emerson, Lake & Palmer

- Keith Emerson – keyboards
- Greg Lake – bass, guitars, vocals, production
- Carl Palmer – drums, percussion

Technical Personnel

- Andy Hendriksen – engineer
- Peter Granet – engineer
- Michael Ross – package concept and design
- Carl Dun – photography

== Charts ==
Chart (1974)	Peak position
Australian Albums (Kent Music Report)	34
Austrian Albums (Ö3 Austria)	2
Canada Top Albums/CDs (RPM)	6
German Albums (Offizielle Top 100)	26
Italian Albums (Musica e Dischi)	7
Japanese Albums (Oricon)	23
Norwegian Albums (VG-lista)	16
UK Albums (Official Charts)	6
US Billboard 200	4

== Certifications ==
Region	Certification	Certified units/sales
United Kingdom (BPI)	Gold	100,000^{^}
United States (RIAA)	Gold	500,000^{^}
^{^} Shipments figures based on certification alone.
