= Brain Salad Surgery =

- Work 217: ELP I by H. R. Giger

Studio album by Emerson, Lake & Palmer
- Released: 7 December 1973
- Recorded: June–September 1973
- Studios: Advision (London); Olympic (London)
- Genre: Progressive rock
- Length: 45:02
- Label: Manticore
- Producer: Greg Lake

Emerson, Lake & Palmer chronology
| Trilogy (1972) | Brain Salad Surgery (1973) | Welcome Back My Friends to the Show That Never Ends – Ladies and Gentlemen (1974) |

Singles from Brain Salad Surgery
- 1. "Jerusalem" Released: 30 November 1973

Brain Salad Surgery is the fourth studio album by English progressive rock band Emerson, Lake & Palmer, released on 7 December 1973 by their new record label, Manticore Records, and distributed by Atlantic Records.

Following the tour in support of their previous album, Trilogy (1972), the group acquired rehearsal facilities to work on new material, which would blend classical and rock themes. They launched their own record company, Manticore, in March 1973. The album was recorded from June to September at Olympic and Advision Studios and mixed in October 1973 at AIR Studios in London. As were all the group's previous works, it was produced by Greg Lake. The album includes a cover designed by H. R. Giger.

Released to a mixed critical response, it has received more favourable reviews since its release. Brain Salad Surgery continued the group's commercial success, reaching No. 2 in the United Kingdom and No. 11 in the United States, and eventually gaining Gold certifications in both countries. In its support, the trio embarked on their largest world tour to date, including a headlining spot at the California Jam festival. The album has been remastered/remixed and reissued numerous times, including stereo (Note: Legacy/Sony Music 88883772862, Legacy/Sony Music 88883772842) and 5.1 surround sound (Note: Legacy/Sony Music 88883772862) remixes by Jakko Jakszyk.

== Background ==
After the release of their third album, Trilogy, in June 1972, the group toured across Europe and the United States, playing in sold-out venues. By the beginning of 1973, Emerson, Lake & Palmer had become commercially successful in both the UK and the US.

The group had become somewhat dissatisfied with their record label Atlantic Records for a lack of involvement. Around January 1973 Keith Emerson, Greg Lake, Carl Palmer, and their manager Stewart Young decided to form their own record company. Together, they bought an abandoned ABC cinema in Fulham, West London and converted it into a rehearsal room and company headquarters, which would later be named Manticore Records. Lake said: "We set up Manticore to try and make the entire record process as good as it could be. We were also aware of a number of artists who we knew were having problems getting their music released and getting a record deal". Since the group knew that they would not have enough time to run their company, Atlantic promoter Mario Medious, who had worked with the group since their debut album, was brought in to serve as the president of Manticore in April 1973. Atlantic handled distribution duties.

== Production ==
Emerson, Lake & Palmer began working on new material at the end of 1972. As Lake explained in an interview, the group's previous record, Trilogy, was recorded with the use of 24-track machines and featured too many overdubs that made the music very difficult to recreate properly on stage. So the trio agreed to record an album that they could perform live. The rehearsal facilities equipped in the former cinema allowed the group to play live, then write, play live again, write again, etc., resulting in a feeling of addressing an audience, that would be alluded to in the well-known line "Welcome back, my friends, to the show that never ends...".

=== Writing ===
During writing sessions around the end of 1972 and the beginning of 1973, the first two tracks began to take shape. One of them was the first movement of what would become the dominating composition of the forthcoming album, the epic "Karn Evil 9", and the other was an adaptation of the 4th Movement of Alberto Ginastera's 1st Piano Concerto.

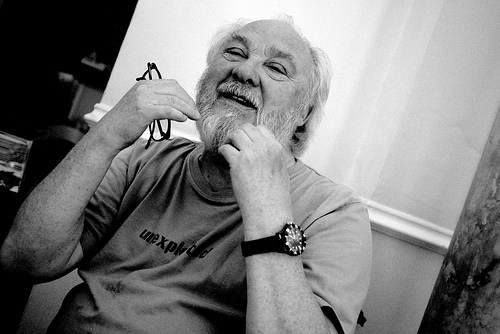
Pete Sinfield co-wrote lyrics with Greg Lake for "Karn Evil 9" and "Benny the Bouncer".

At nearly 30 minutes long, "Karn Evil 9" would consist of three movements (called "Impressions"). Due to time limitations, the first movement initially had to be split into two parts between sides one and two of the vinyl record. Although the original Atlantic CD (Note: Atlantic 19124-2 (US), Atlantic 781 523-2 (Europe)) retained the division of the suite, subsequent editions have presented it in an uninterrupted version. All music of the epic was written by Emerson and can be described as a futuristic fusion of classical and rock themes. Structurally, the first and third movements are separated by an extended instrumental passage in spite of the whole composition having initially been conceived as an instrumental. All lyrics in the first movement are credited to Lake. To assist in creating lyrics for the third movement, he brought in lyricist Pete Sinfield, with whom Lake had worked at the time he was in King Crimson. Sinfield had been planning to make a solo album and had asked Lake for help to release it on Manticore. Lake had agreed that the record label would support Sinfield's project and additionally suggested his contributing to lyrics for the group's next album. Sinfield recalled: "I was half way through making a solo album when Greg called me to say that Manticore wanted to release it. The catch was that he wanted me to collaborate on lyrics for a long piece that had begun to take shape". The main theme of the epic is the battle between artificial and natural intelligence, which would end with a man being taken over by the computer he had invented. It had initially been titled by Emerson as "Ganton 9" after a fictional planet to which all evil and decadence had been thrown out. However, Sinfield believed that the music Emerson had written sounded just like a carnival, and so he came up with the title "Karn Evil 9".

The most recognisable section of "Karn Evil 9" is the second part of the first movement, containing the famous line "Welcome back, my friends, to the show that never ends...", which was eventually taken as the title of the group's second live album. It is often used as a song dedicated to the opening of sports seasons. It is also a common radio staple.

On paper, it appears as insane as it ever did. It kicks off with a hymn, goes into a section of piano concerto rewritten to feature the first recorded appearance of 'electronic percussion', then a pretty acoustic ballad, then a barroom piano knees-up, all topped off with a half-hour science fiction suite. It shouldn’t work, but it does. Brilliantly.

— Ian Fortnam describing the content of the album

Emerson had contemplated recording an adaptation of the 4th Movement ("Toccata concertata") of Ginastera's 1st Piano Concerto as far back as the beginning of 1971. He had heard the toccata for the first time when he was a member of The Nice and had been "struck with the music immediately". Emerson had not considered a possibility of Emerson, Lake & Palmer playing the piece until Palmer proposed to incorporate a drum solo into the trio's repertoire, which would be a core part of the composition. When Emerson played the toccata to Palmer, the latter approved it, and then, the piece was rehearsed by the entire group, although it was quite difficult, since Lake did not read music and Palmer was unable to apply a score written for piano to the drums.

Both "Karn Evil 9: 1st Impression" and "Toccata" were included in the setlist for a series of concerts across Europe beginning at the end of March 1973. Around that time, a new semi-acoustic number, "Still....You Turn Me On", was introduced to the public. Written by Lake alone, the song has commonly been regarded as a necessary balance in the content, which is dominated by aggressive compositions. The next track intended for inclusion in the album was an adaptation of Hubert Parry's hymn "Jerusalem", with the lyrics from "And did those feet in ancient time", a short poem from the preface to William Blake's epic Milton. Finally, the last piece which would make the album was the honky-tonk piano-based song "Benny the Bouncer" composed by Emerson, with Lake and Sinfield writing the words.

After the album was almost completely recorded, three additional tracks, which would be put on the shelf for a while, were written: the instrumental "When the Apple Blossoms Bloom in the Windmills of Your Mind I'll Be Your Valentine", credited to the entire group, "Tiger in a Spotlight" and the title song, both composed by Emerson, with Lake and Sinfield providing lyrics. Brain Salad Surgery was the first album to have no songwriting contributions from Palmer (aside from the drum solo in "Toccata"), who, nevertheless, has regarded it as his favourite by far.

=== Recording ===
The recording sessions began in June 1973 at Olympic Studios in Barnes, London, with Lake, as he had done on the group's previous records, serving as the producer, and Chris Kimsey as the engineer. The only track committed to tape at Olympic was the first Impression of "Karn Evil 9". Following a period of further writing, the work on the upcoming album continued in August at Advision Studios in Fitzrovia, London, with engineer Geoff Young. The second and third Impressions of "Karn Evil 9" were completed in the first half of that month, with the third Impression being the first track to be recorded at Advision. The muse's sped-up and altered voice from the second Impression and the 'computer' voice from the third Impression were contributed by Emerson, his only vocal credit in the trio's repertoire. In order to achieve the "computer" voice, he ran his voice through the Moog's ring modulator.

Keith Emerson has beautifully caught the mood of my piece.

— Alberto Ginastera

Although an arrangement of Ginastera's toccata had been performed by the group on their European tour from March to April 1973, the composition had received additional instrumentation before its final version was recorded. Palmer had written a percussion movement with the use of eight specially developed drum synthesizers. This movement with an "atmospheric" electronic sound was inserted in the middle section of "Toccata". Soon after the adaptation was committed to tape in September, the group became aware that they did not have the rights to release this music. Emerson contacted Ginastera's publishers who responded that the composer would not allow any adaptation of his works, but they advised him to talk to him personally. So Emerson flew to Geneva to discuss the issue with Ginastera himself. Once Ginastera heard the new arrangement, he gave the authorization to use his piece. To quote Emerson: "He played our recording of "Toccata" on a tape recorder. After a few bars he stopped the tape ... and exclaimed 'Diabolic!' I thought he said 'diabolical' and expected him to show us the door. He had been listening to the tape in mono and our recording was in stereo. I jumped up and switched the machine to stereo hoping he would listen again. It transpired that he wasn't concerned about that at all. He listened again and declared 'Terrible!' which actually was a compliment. 'You've captured the essence of my music like no one else has before', the great maestro said."

The next songs recorded at Advision were "Still....You Turn Me On" and "Jerusalem". The adaptation of the hymn is notable for the debut of the first polyphonic synthesizer in history, the Moog Apollo, which was just a prototype of the Polymoog at that time. Together with the Lyra monophonic and the Taurus bass synthesizers, it formed the Moog Polyphonic Ensemble, also known as the Constellation. The Apollo synthesizer was also used by Emerson on "Karn Evil 9: 3rd Impression".

In addition to its considerable evolution of synthesizer technology, Brain Salad Surgery also contained a higher proportion of songs featuring acoustic and electric guitars than their earlier work. Whereas the first three studio albums contained only one or two tracks each with guitars, "Toccata", "Benny The Bouncer" and both parts of "Karn Evil 9: 1st Impression" all feature electric guitar texturing, with two lengthy guitar solos highlighting Karn Evil 9. "Still You Turn Me On" additionally features multiple acoustic guitars and wah-wah guitar accents in addition to Emerson on harpsichord and accordion. From this point onward, the guitar would become a more common addition to ELP albums although it would remain subordinate to Emerson's keyboard work.

=== Mixing ===
The results of the four-month recording sessions were mixed in the first week of October 1973 at AIR Studios in London. The original mix was turned down by Emerson, Lake & Palmer, and as a result, most of the material was remixed once more to their satisfaction. The first mixes of several tracks have been released on some more recent reissues of the album.

== Artwork and packaging ==
Work 218: ELP II by H. R. Giger, chosen as an illustration for the vinyl triptych sleeve inside

Since cover art for the impending album was required, Manticore manager Peter Zumsteg introduced Emerson to a popular artist, Hans Ruedi Giger, who was living in Zurich. In April 1973, as a part of their European tour, the group played a two-day concert there. After the concert, Emerson with Zumsteg visited the artist at his home. At that time, the working title for the album was Medious' expression Whip Some Skull on Ya, which is translated as fellatio. Coincidentally, under the impact of the music, including Emerson, Lake & Palmer, Giger had just created a human skull-based triptych entitled Work 216: Landscape XIX. When he revealed the triptych to his guests, Emerson immediately felt that it was completely appropriate for the album cover art.

It was dark and very foreboding, and for me it represented ELP's music.

— Keith Emerson on H. R. Giger's art

Subsequently, the album title was changed to Brain Salad Surgery, which has the same meaning as Whip Some Skull on Ya. The phrase was probably taken from the song "Right Place, Wrong Time" by Dr. John, which had been a hit single in summer 1973 and contains the line "I been running trying to get hung up in my mind, got to give myself a little talking to this time, just need a little brain salad surgery, got to cure this insecurity."

Giger painted two new pieces approximately the actual size of the vinyl record entitled Work 217: ELP I and Work 218: ELP II. The first painting was chosen by the group as the front cover. It contains the artist's distinctive monochromatic biomechanical artwork, integrating an industrial mechanism with a human skull and the new 'ELP' logotype, which was also designed by Giger and has been standard for Emerson, Lake & Palmer ever since. The lower part of the skull is covered by a circular screen, which displays the mouth and chin in its flesh-covered state, as well as what appears to be the top of a phallus below the chin, arising from the 'ELP' tube. Art director Fabio Nicoli insisted on a non-standard construction of the vinyl sleeve rather than being a normal gatefold. The front cover of the novelty triptych sleeve was split in half down the centre, except for the circular screen, which was attached to the right flap, and was opened up like a gate. Opening the flaps revealed the second painting, featuring the full face of a human female (modelled after Giger's partner Li Tobler) with ringlets of wire hair framing the closed eyes and multiple scars, including the infinity symbol and a scar from a frontal lobotomy. The illustration originally had the complete phallus, but when the artwork was presented to the record company, it was rejected and dismissed as pornographic. As Giger refused to take the penis off the painting, the group had another artist airbrush it into a shaft of glowing light. The back cover was entirely black with the large white lettering 'Brain Salad Surgery'. Work 217: ELP I was also used as a custom label, with the spindle of the turntable penetrating through the lips. The vinyl packaging included a 12-panel fold-out poster with photographs of Emerson, Lake, and Palmer, which were taken by Rosemary Adams.

When Manticore Records went defunct in 1977, Atlantic Records reissued the album with the initial design as well as with an ordinary vinyl packaging (Note: Atlantic SD 19124), which consisted of simple non fold-out outer and inner sleeves. The 'face' painting was used as the back cover of the outer sleeve.

After the exhibition Giger in Prague was closed on 31 August 2005, the two original 34×34 cm acrylic-on-paper paintings Work 217: ELP I and Work 218: ELP II were lost or stolen and have not yet been found.

== Release ==
Prior to the album becoming available, British newspaper New Musical Express released an issue with an attached free promotional flexi disc (Note: Lyntone LYN 2762) on 10 November 1973. Packaged in a miniature facsimile of the original album sleeve, the one-sided flexi disc, playing at 33 1/3 rpm, contained the song "Brain Salad Surgery", along with excerpts from all five tracks of the forthcoming album. Being a late-recorded track, the title song had not been intended for Brain Salad Surgery and was not included in its track listing. However, it was later used as the B-side to the UK number-two hit single "Fanfare for the Common Man" and ended up on the compilation of studio outtakes Works Volume 2 (1977).

Brain Salad Surgery was released in the United Kingdom on 7 December 1973 by Manticore Records and was available on vinyl record, cassette, and 8-track cartridge through distribution by Atlantic Records. A reel-to-reel version of the album was also briefly available. The very first vinyl pressings (Note: Manticore K53501/MC66669) were manufactured in the United States, along with the sleeves due to their non-standard construction. The album was a large seller, peaking at No. 2 on the UK Albums Chart and spending there 18 weeks. It was held from the top spot for two weeks in a row only by Tales from Topographic Oceans from the arch-rival group Yes. On 1 March 1974, the album was certified Gold by British Phonographic Industry for sales in excess of 100,000 copies. In Canada the album spent 3 weeks at No. 10 and was in the Top 100 for 39 weeks.

The BBC was very conservative in its outlook in those days. I think they felt our version of "Jerusalem" was a bit of an affront to Britishness.

— Greg Lake on the BBC's airplay ban of "Jerusalem"

In spite of the feeling that Lake's acoustic song "Still....You Turn Me On" stood out as an evident single choice, Emerson, Lake & Palmer did not select it for a release, both because Palmer did not play on the track and because it was least representative of the album or their general direction. Instead of that song, the group's interpretation of "Jerusalem" was chosen for the single, which would be backed with another studio out-take, "When the Apple Blossoms Bloom in the Windmills of Your Mind I'll Be Your Valentine". The single (Note: Manticore K13503) was released on 30 November 1973, but its success was inhibited by the BBC, which banned the song from airplay. As a result, "Jerusalem" failed to chart in the United Kingdom.

In the United States, Brain Salad Surgery was released in December 1973 by Manticore on vinyl record, (Note: Manticore MC66669) cassette, and 8-track cartridge, and distributed by Atlantic. Although no singles were issued, it climbed to No. 11 on the Billboard 200 and stayed in the charts for 47 weeks, more than any other Emerson, Lake & Palmer album. It has been certified Gold by the Recording Industry Association of America for selling at least 500,000 copies in the United States.

=== Reissues ===
The album was released for the first time on CD, which was mastered by Barry Diament, in 1986. The earliest copies for the U.S. market were pressed in Japan. It was also released on CD in 1987 in West Germany under the Manticore label by RCA/Ariola and was the first to feature Karn Evil 9 playing in its entirety (While the tracks for Karn Evil 9 is split up, 1st Impression Part 1 & Part 2 does not fade out and fade in). Since then Brain Salad Surgery has been remastered/remixed, expanded, and reissued multiple times in different formats, with the studio outtakes "Brain Salad Surgery" and "When the Apple Blossoms Bloom in the Windmills of Your Mind I'll Be Your Valentine" having often been added as bonus tracks. In 1993, the album was remastered by Joseph M. Palmaccio (Note: 383 480 020-2 (US), Victory 828 468-2 (Europe), Castle Music CMRCD201, Victory VC2 0020 (most US and Canada club editions)). In 2000, Rhino Entertainment Company released a DVD-Audio containing a 5.1 surround sound mix (Note: Rhino R9 75980, Sanctuary 5308195), done by John Kellogg and Paul Klingberg.

Because of its length, "Karn Evil 9: 1st Impression" had originally been split into two parts for vinyl, with a fade-out at the end of side 1 and a fade-in at the beginning of side 2. Some early CD editions continued to split the track, but since then it has been presented as a single, uninterrupted piece.

In 2008, a remastered and expanded three-disc 35th-anniversary deluxe edition (Note: Sanctuary 5308195) was released by Sanctuary Records, a subsidiary label of Universal Music Group at that time. Disc 1 (CD) contained the original album, remastered by Paschal Byrne. Disc 2 (CD) consisted of different recordings and mixes of tracks associated with Brain Salad Surgery, as well as two bonus tracks: "When the Apple Blossoms Bloom in the Windmills of Your Mind I'll Be Your Valentine" and "Brain Salad Surgery". Disc 3 was a hybrid SACD containing the original album in stereo and surround sound. For the 5.1 mix, the 2000 Rhino version was taken.

In 2014, a limited six-disc super deluxe box set edition was released by Legacy/Sony Music. Disc 1 (CD) contained the original album, remastered by Andy Pearce. Disc 2 (CD) was composed of bonus tracks associated with Brain Salad Surgery. Disc 3 (CD) contained a new stereo version of the album. The original and new stereo versions in high resolution along with a brand new 5.1 surround sound mix by Jakko Jakszyk were featured on Disc 4 (DVD-Audio). The Manticore Special Documentary film, photo gallery, and Giger's original artwork were included in Disc 5 (DVD-Video). Finally, Disc 6 was a 180gm vinyl record with the original album. A cut-down three-disc edition, (Note: Legacy/Sony Music 88883772842) which consisted of the Discs 1, 2, and 4 (but without the 5.1 mix), received international release around the same time. In Japan, the 40th anniversary 3 disc edition, on the Victor Entertainment label, contains the new stereo and 5.1 surround mixes as well as original stereo mixes on DVD-audio on the first disc, the original album remastered on the second disc, and on the third disc the Alternate Brain Salad Surgery with bonus tracks.

To mark the 50th anniversary a picture disc depicting the original Giger album artwork was released in the UK for Record Store Day on 22 April 2023.

== Critical reception ==
Professional ratings
Review scores
| Source | Rating |
|---|---|
| AllMusic | 4.5/5 stars |
| Christgau's Record Guide | C− |
| Classic Rock Revisited | A+ |
| The Daily Vault | A− |
| MusicHound Rock | 2.5/5 stars |
| The Rolling Stone Record Guide | 4/5 stars |

Upon its initial release, the album was met with a remarkably polarized critical reception. Gordon Fletcher of Rolling Stone considered that although Emerson, Lake & Palmer managed to vanquish "insufficient intensity and lack of worthy material" of their previous records in live performances, these flaws overwhelmed all the group's positives in the studio, resulting in things like Brain Salad Surgery, which was deemed as a "sadly uneven album from a group with technical gifts equal to that of any British trio". In particular, he counted the lyrics of "Still....You Turn Me On" to be somewhat overblown and dismissed "Benny the Bouncer" as "a needless nonsensical whimsey". Writing for The Village Voice, Robert Christgau, who had never been favourable towards Emerson, Lake & Palmer, submitted a review, which consisted entirely of rhetorical questions, and assigned the album a very low "C−" rating. On the other side, Pete Erskine of Sounds was positive about the record, calling it the group's "most uncluttered and melodic album to date and certainly their rockiest". In The Pittsburgh Press, critic Pete Bishop praised "the unmatched keyboard virtuosity of Keith Emerson," and called the album "a feast of sounds and imagination." Before its release in the United States in December 1973, Brain Salad Surgery was reviewed by Billboard and described as "a complex, exciting sonic experience which touches on several bases—heavy rock, flowing jazz and some zesty pop material".

Retrospective response has been predominantly favourable. AllMusic contributor Bruce Eder cited the record as "Emerson, Lake & Palmer's most successful and well-realized album, and their most ambitious as a group, as well as their loudest". He summarized that it represents "a high point that the trio would never again achieve, or even aspire to". Paul Stump, in his 1997 History of Progressive Rock, characterized the album as frustratingly uneven, but highlighted the "demonic" version of "Toccata" and the group instrumental workout in the third part of "Karn Evil 9" as among the band's finest moments. While reviewing the box set A Time and a Place for the online All About Jazz magazine, John Kelman mentioned Brain Salad Surgery as a "crowning masterpiece" and the group's "undeniable high water mark". The album was included in the musical reference book 1,000 Recordings to Hear Before You Die, where it was called "the most fully realized—and still decidedly brazen—ELP statement".

In 2005, Q Classic and Mojo magazines placed Brain Salad Surgery at No. 5 on their "40 Cosmic Rock Albums", which was published in the special edition Pink Floyd & The Story of Prog Rock. In 2015, it was ranked the 12th greatest progressive rock album of all time by Rolling Stone, whose reviewer Will Hermes characterised the record as "prescient and pretty damn rocking".

== Tour ==
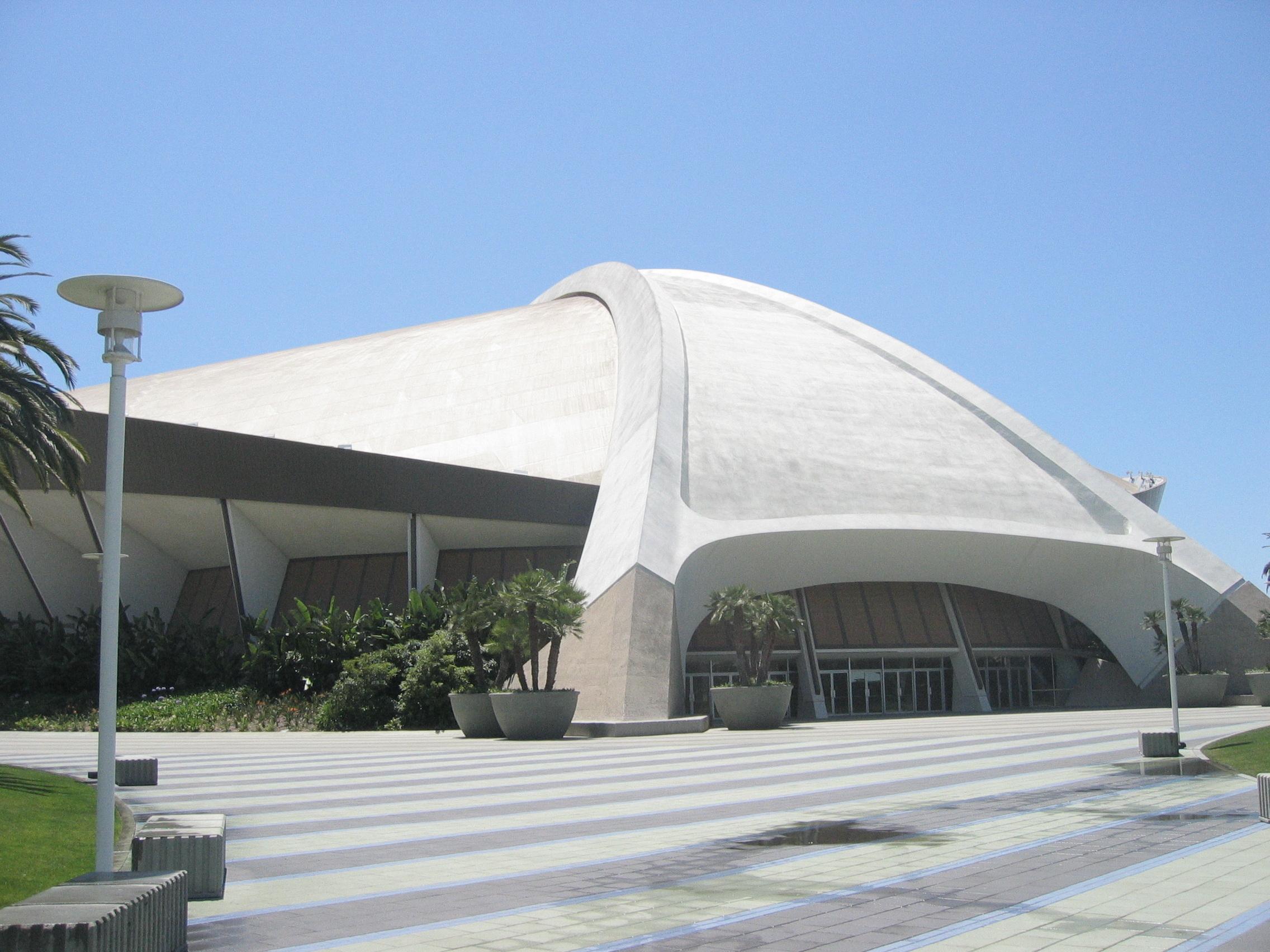
Arena at the Anaheim Convention Center, where Welcome Back, My Friends, to the Show That Never Ends ~ Ladies and Gentlemen was recorded

Soon after the recording sessions ended and the tracks were mixed in October 1973, the group rehearsed for their upcoming world tour to promote the album. Spanning from 14 November 1973 to 21 August 1974, and including 100 live performances, it comprised four parts: Leg 1—North America (from 14 November 1973 to 18 December 1973, 28 shows), Leg 2—North America (from 24 January 1974 to 6 April 1974, 29 shows), Leg 3—Europe (from 18 April 1974 to 1 June 1974, 26 shows), and Leg 4—North America (from 26 July 1974 to 21 August 1974, 17 shows).

On stage, Emerson, Lake & Palmer mixed the complex musicianship of their material with theatrics which attracted criticism. These included Emerson playing a grand piano while it revolved in mid-air, and abusing the Hammond organ by sticking knives in the manuals, throwing it around the stage and letting it feed back, while Palmer played on a revolving drum kit. The group carried almost 40 tons of equipment, which took five hours to unpack and set up, including a 30-channel board discrete quadraphonic public address sound system provided by International Entertainers Service, and a state-of-the-art lighting system, designed by Judy Rasmussen, which consisted of large ladders at each corner of the stage and two arches installed above the performance area.

Their 2 February 1974 concert, which was played in the main arena at the Anaheim Convention Center in Anaheim, California, was documented on the three-disc anthology Welcome Back, My Friends, to the Show That Never Ends ~ Ladies and Gentlemen, released on 19 August 1974. Much of the performance was also used for broadcasting on the American rock music radio show King Biscuit Flower Hour. The live album reached No. 6 on the UK charts and No. 4 on the Billboard 200, which was the highest U.S. chart position the trio ever achieved.

Arguably the most high-profile performance was on 6 April 1974, when Emerson, Lake & Palmer co-headlined with Deep Purple at the California Jam festival, held at the Ontario Motor Speedway in Ontario, California, with an attendance of 350,000 paying fans. Only 55 minutes of the group's 2 1/2-hour festival-closing set was aired by ABC television network, which was a sponsor of the festival, on 7 May and 10 June 1974. The remaining footage of ELP's entire performance has thus far not surfaced (unlike Deep Purple, whose entire 1-hour set has been issued in various audio and video releases). The extant ELP footage was eventually released on video in 2005 as a part of Beyond the Beginning DVD-Video. The audio recordings first appeared in 1998 on the album Then & Now.

After the tour was completed in August 1974, Emerson, Lake & Palmer took an extended hiatus from recording and performing. In 1976, the group reunited to work on their next album, Works Volume 1 (1977).

== Track listing ==
Side one
| No. | Title | Lyrics | Music | Length |
|---|---|---|---|---|
| 1. | "Jerusalem" | William Blake | Hubert Parry (arranged by Keith Emerson, Greg Lake and Carl Palmer) | 2:44 |
| 2. | "Toccata" (an adaptation of Ginastera's 1st piano concerto, 4th movement) | Instrumental | Alberto Ginastera (arranged by Emerson, percussion movement—Palmer) | 7:23 |
| 3. | "Still...You Turn Me On" | Lake | Lake | 2:53 |
| 4. | "Benny the Bouncer" | Lake, Pete Sinfield | Emerson | 2:21 |
| 5. | "Karn Evil 9: 1st Impression—Part 1" | Lake | Emerson | 8:43 |
| Total length: | | | | 24:04 |

Side two
| No. | Title | Lyrics | Music | Length |
|---|---|---|---|---|
| 6. | "Karn Evil 9: 1st Impression—Part 2" | Lake | Emerson | 4:47 |
| 7. | "Karn Evil 9: 2nd Impression" | Instrumental | Emerson | 7:07 |
| 8. | "Karn Evil 9: 3rd Impression" | Lake, Sinfield | Emerson | 9:03 |
| Total length: | | | | 20:57 45:02 |

1996 Rhino Records remastered edition bonus track
| No. | Title | Length |
|---|---|---|
| 9. | "The Making of Brain Salad Surgery" | 13:40 |
| Total length: | | 58:58 |

2000 Rhino Records DVD-Audio bonus track
| No. | Title | Lyrics | Music | Length |
|---|---|---|---|---|
| 9. | "Lucky Man" | Lake | Lake |

2001 Castle Music remastered edition bonus tracks
| No. | Title | Lyrics | Music | Length |
|---|---|---|---|---|
| 9. | "Brain Salad Surgery" (single) | Lake, Sinfield | Emerson | 3:08 |
| 10. | "When the Apple Blossoms Bloom in the Windmills of Your Mind I'll Be Your Valentine" (single) | | Emerson, Lake, Palmer | 3:57 |
| 11. | "Excerpts from Brain Salad Surgery" (flexi disc) | | | 5:59 |

2007 Shout! Factory remastered edition bonus tracks
| No. | Title | Lyrics | Music | Length |
|---|---|---|---|---|
| 9. | "Jerusalem" (alternate mix) | Blake | Parry (arranged by Emerson, Lake, and Palmer) | 2:47 |
| 10. | "Karn Evil 9" (instrumental mix) | | Emerson | 13:26 |
| Total length: | | | | 61:17 |

2008 Sanctuary Records deluxe edition disc two: bonus tracks
| No. | Title | Lyrics | Music | Length |
|---|---|---|---|---|
| 1. | "When the Apple Blossoms Bloom in the Windmills of Your Mind I'll Be Your Valentine" | | Emerson, Lake, Palmer | 3:59 |
| 2. | "Brain Salad Surgery" | Lake, Sinfield | Emerson | 3:08 |
| 3. | "Karn Evil 9: 3rd Impression" (original backing track) | | Emerson | 9:09 |
| 4. | "Jerusalem" (first mix) | Blake | Parry (arranged by Emerson, Lake, and Palmer) | 2:46 |
| 5. | "Still...You Turn Me On" (first mix) | Lake | Lake | 2:53 |
| 6. | "Toccata" (first mix) | | Ginastera (arranged by Emerson, percussion movement—Palmer) | 7:22 |
| 7. | "Karn Evil 9: 1st Impression—Part 1" (unreleased until 35th anniversary version) | Lake | Emerson | 8:34 |
| 8. | "Karn Evil 9: 1st Impression—Part 2" (unreleased until 35th anniversary version) | Lake | Emerson | 4:48 |
| 9. | "Karn Evil 9: 2nd Impression" (unreleased until 35th anniversary version) | | Emerson | 7:07 |
| 10. | "Karn Evil 9: 3rd Impression" (unreleased until 35th anniversary version) | Lake, Sinfield | Emerson | 9:05 |
| 11. | "Excerpts from Brain Salad Surgery" (from the NME Flexidisc 1973) | | | 3:07 |
| 12. | "Excerpts from Brain Salad Surgery" (untitled hidden track) | | | 2:52 |
| Total length: | | | | 64:54 |

2011 Legacy/Sony Music remastered edition bonus tracks
| No. | Title | Lyrics | Music | Length |
|---|---|---|---|---|
| 9. | "Brain Salad Surgery" | Lake, Sinfield | Emerson | 3:08 |
| 10. | "When the Apple Blossoms Bloom in the Windmills of Your Mind I'll Be Your Valentine" | | Emerson, Lake, Palmer | 3:57 |
| 11. | "Excerpts from Brain Salad Surgery" | | | 2:51 |
| Total length: | | | | 54:57 |

2014 Legacy/Sony Music edition disc two: The Alternate Brain Salad Surgery
| No. | Title | Lyrics | Music | Length |
|---|---|---|---|---|
| 1. | "Karn Evil 9: 3rd Impression" (original backing track) | | Emerson | 9:11 |
| 2. | "Jerusalem" (first mix) | Blake | Parry (arranged by Emerson, Lake, and Palmer) | 2:46 |
| 3. | "Still... You Turn Me On" (first mix) | Lake | Lake | 2:53 |
| 4. | "Toccata" (alternate version) | | Ginastera (arranged by Emerson, percussion movement—Palmer) | 7:23 |
| 5. | "Karn Evil 9: 1st Impression—Part 1" (alternate version) | Lake | Emerson | 8:37 |
| 6. | "Karn Evil 9: 1st Impression—Part 2" (alternate version) | Lake | Emerson | 4:48 |
| 7. | "Karn Evil 9: 2nd Impression" (alternate version) | | Emerson | 7:07 |
| 8. | "Karn Evil 9: 3rd Impression" (alternate version) | Lake, Sinfield | Emerson | 9:06 |
| 9. | "Excerpts from Brain Salad Surgery" (NME flexi disc version) | | | 2:52 |
| 10. | "When the Apple Blossoms Bloom in the Windmills of Your Mind I'll Be Your Valentine" (B-side of single K13503) | | Emerson, Lake, Palmer | 3:57 |
| 11. | "Brain Salad Surgery" (B-side of single K10946) | Lake, Sinfield | Emerson | 3:07 |
| 12. | "Brain Salad Surgery" (instrumental) | | Emerson | 2:22 |
| 13. | "Karn Evil 9: 3rd Impression" (different version) | | Emerson | 8:26 |
| Total length: | | | | 72:36 |

Some CD editions have the entire suite "Karn Evil 9" as one track, giving the album a total of five tracks:

5-track CD version
| No. | Title | Lyrics | Music | Length |
|---|---|---|---|---|
| 1. | "Jerusalem" | Blake | Parry (arranged by Emerson, Lake, and Palmer) | 2:45 |
| 2. | "Toccata" (an adaptation of Ginastera's 1st piano concerto, 4th movement) | | Ginastera (arranged by Emerson, percussion movement—Palmer) | 7:23 |
| 3. | "Still...You Turn Me On" | Lake | Lake | 2:53 |
| 4. | "Benny the Bouncer" | Lake, Sinfield | Emerson | 2:21 |
| 5. | "Karn Evil 9" | Lake, Sinfield | Emerson | 29:39 |
| Total length: | | | | 45:02 |

== Personnel ==
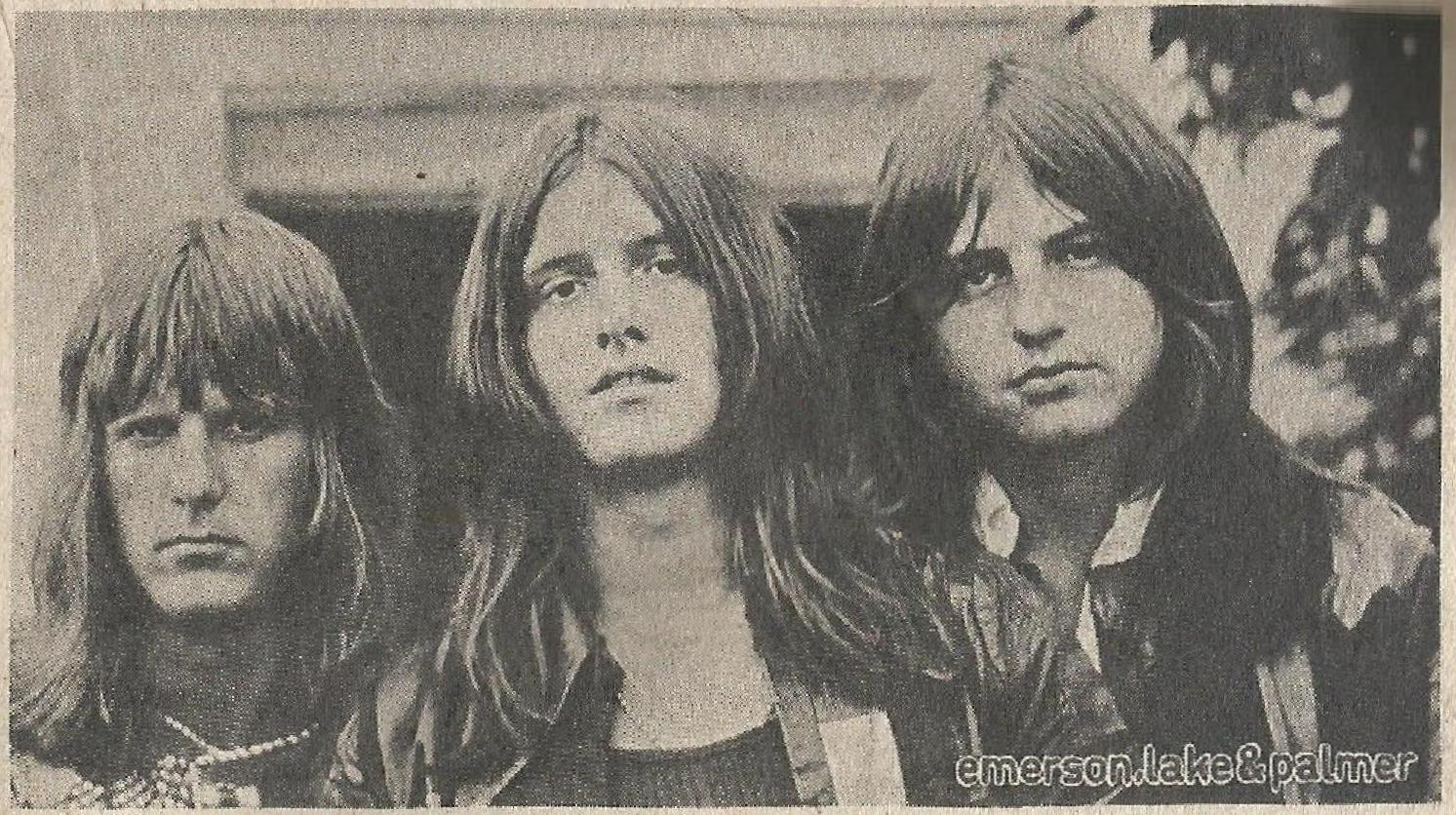
(left to right) Emerson, Palmer and Lake in 1972

=== Emerson, Lake & Palmer ===
- Keith Emerson – organs, piano, harpsichord, Clavinet, Moog synthesizers, Moog Polyphonic Ensemble (known as the Constellation, comprising the Apollo polyphonic, the Lyra monophonic, and the Taurus Moog bass pedals synthesizers), 'computer' voice (on "Karn Evil 9: 3rd Impression")
- Greg Lake – vocals, bass, electric and acoustic guitars; production
- Carl Palmer – drums, percussion, percussion synthesizers

=== Technical ===
- Geoff Young – engineer (all tracks except "Karn Evil 9: 1st Impression")
- Chris Kimsey – engineer ("Karn Evil 9: 1st Impression")
- Barry Diament – CD mastering (at Atlantic Studios, New York)
- Joseph M. Palmaccio – 1993 remastering (at PolyGram Studios)
- Bill Inglot and Dan Hersch – 1996 remastering (Note: Rhino R2 72459)
- John Kellogg – 2000 5.1 remix production and mastering (at Magna Vision Studios, Santa Monica, California)
- Paul Klingberg – 2000 5.1 remix engineering, mixing, and mastering (at Magna Vision Studios, Santa Monica, California)
- Mark Chalecki – 2007 remastering (Note: Shout! Factory 826663-10642) (at Capitol Mastering, Hollywood)
- Paschal Byrne – 2008 stereo remastering (at The Audio Archiving Company, London)
- Andy Pearce – 2011 remastering (Note: Legacy/Sony Music 88697830132), 2014 remastering
- Matt Wortham – 2014 remastering
- Jakko Jakszyk – 2014 stereo and 5.1 mixing (at Silesia Sound, Hertfordshire)
- H. R. Giger – cover painting
- Fabio Nicoli Associates – design and art direction
- Rosemary Adams – photography

== Charts ==
=== Weekly charts ===
| Chart (1973–74) | Peak position |
|---|---|
| Australian Albums (Kent Music Report) | 17 |
| Austrian Albums (Ö3 Austria) | 5 |
| Canada Top Albums/CDs (RPM) | 10 |
| Finnish Albums (The Official Finnish Charts) | 26 |
| German Albums (Offizielle Top 100) | 18 |
| Italian Albums (Musica e Dischi) | 9 |
| Japanese Albums (Oricon) | 18 |
| Norwegian Albums (VG-lista) | 5 |
| UK Albums (Official Charts) | 2 |
| US Billboard 200 | 11 |

| Chart (2014) | Peak position |
|---|---|
| UK Rock & Metal Albums (Official Charts) | 9 |

=== Year-end charts ===
| Chart (1974) | Position |
|---|---|
| Canada Top Albums/CDs (RPM) | 74 |
| German Albums (Offizielle Top 100) | 42 |

== Certifications ==
| Region | Certification | Certified units/sales |
|---|---|---|
| United Kingdom (BPI) | Gold | 100,000^{^} |
| United States (RIAA) | Platinum | 1,000,000^{^} |
^{^} Shipments figures based on certification alone.
