= Piano Concerto No. 1 (Emerson) =

Instrumental by Keith Emerson

from the album Works Volume 1 (ELP)
- Released: 25 March 1977
- Recorded: 1976
- Genre: Classical
- Length: 18:18
- Label: Atlantic
- Songwriter: Keith Emerson
- Producers: Keith Emerson, Greg Lake, Carl Palmer, Peter Sinfield

"Piano Concerto No. 1" is a composition for piano and orchestra by the British musician Keith Emerson. It was released on the 1977 album Works Volume 1, by the progressive rock band Emerson, Lake & Palmer. The piece is 18 minutes long, and takes up the whole first side on the album.

According to Jim Allen of Ultimate Classic Rock, the piece is performed with the London Philharmonic Orchestra, and the piece "maximizes his classical inspirations while also finding time to work in some distinct jazz flavors". Allen said that the piece was a "pretty ballsy move" to open an album, even for ELP standards.

== Movements ==
"Piano Concerto No. 1" is split up into three movements, which are:

1. Allegro giocoso (9:23)
2. Andante molto cantabile (2:10)
3. Toccata con fuoco (6:47)

A live performance of the third movement in "Piano Concerto No. 1", Toccata con fuoco, is included on the 1998 album Then and Now.

== Reception ==
AllMusic reviewer Bruce Eder said that "Piano Concerto No. 1" is "on the level of a good music-student piece, without much original language", and that "where Emerson, in conjunction with his conductor and co-orchestrator, John Mayer, succeeds admirably is in writing beautiful virtuoso passages for the piano."

== Personnel ==
- Keith Emerson – piano
- London Philharmonic Orchestra
- John Mayer – conductor
