= Still...You Turn Me On =

Song by Emerson, Lake & Palmer

from the album Brain Salad Surgery
- Released: 7 December 1973
- Recorded: 1973
- Genre: Progressive rock; folk rock
- Length: 2:53
- Label: Manticore
- Songwriter: Greg Lake
- Producer: Greg Lake

"Still...You Turn Me On" is a song by the progressive rock band Emerson, Lake & Palmer. It was released on their 1973 album Brain Salad Surgery. It is the only song on the album that lead singer and guitarist Greg Lake wrote entirely by himself.

== Song ==
"Still...You Turn Me On" is usually considered to be a necessary balance on the album as a romantic ballad. The other songs on the album are aggressive rock compositions.

Although the song stood out as an obvious single choice, Emerson, Lake & Palmer did not choose it for a single release. There were two reasons: that drummer Carl Palmer did not play on the song and also that it was the least representative of the album or the group's general sound.

=== Reception ===
Rolling Stone magazine included the song in their list of 10 Essential ELP Songs and said that it is "Lake's songcraft and Emerson's atmosphere that makes 'Still… You Turn Me On' so timeless. Even when obsessed with the sounds of the future, ELP knew a good tune was always at the heart of their art".

Aaron Ghitelman of Live for Live Music said that "Still… You Turn Me On" showcases Lake's "mastery" as a singer-songwriter. He also called the song very good.

Tom Muscarella of Rock ’n’ Roll Remnants described the song as a lovely ballad, and also said that "Still...You Turn Me On" was in the same style as "Lucky Man".

Classic Rock said that the song had "poetic and beautiful with layered riffs and a nice counter-balance of melody and song craft to the furious instrumental which precedes it. This short but poignant song contains profound yet romantic lyrics which earned it a fair share of radio play".

=== Other appearances ===
Live versions of the song can be found on the albums Welcome Back My Friends to the Show That Never Ends, Live at the Royal Albert Hall, King Biscuit Flower Hour: Greatest Hits Live as well as 8 appearances on the four-volume series The Original Bootleg Series from the Manticore Vaults. It also appears on the greatest hits album The Best of Emerson, Lake & Palmer.

== Musicians ==
- Keith Emerson – harpsichord, accordion
- Greg Lake – bass, 12-string guitar, electric guitar, vocals
- Carl Palmer - tambourine
