= Karn Evil 9 =

Musical suite by Emerson Lake and Palmer

Composition by Emerson, Lake & Palmer

from the album Brain Salad Surgery
- Released: 7 December 1973
- Recorded: 1973
- Genre: Progressive rock
- Length: 29:37
- Label: Manticore Records
- Composer: Keith Emerson
- Lyricists: Greg Lake, Peter Sinfield
- Producer: Greg Lake

"Karn Evil 9" is an extended work by progressive rock group Emerson, Lake & Palmer, appearing on the album Brain Salad Surgery. A futuristic fusion of rock and classical themes, it was written by band members Keith Emerson and Greg Lake with former King Crimson lyricist Peter Sinfield. It is the fifth and final track on Brain Salad Surgery and, with a running length of 29 minutes and 37 seconds, is Emerson, Lake & Palmer's longest studio recording. The initial release of the album on vinyl split "Karn Evil 9" between the two sides due to its length, with a fade out/fade in between First Impression Parts 1 and 2.

Part or all of the song is included on many of the group's live albums and on all of the group's compilation albums and box sets.

== Impressions ==
"Karn Evil 9" consists of three movements (called "impressions"), with the first impression being divided into two parts:

- 1st Impression, Part 1 (0:00 to 8:41)
- 1st Impression, Part 2 (8:42 to 13:22)
- 2nd Impression (13:23 to 20:30)
- 3rd Impression (20:31 to 29:37)

== Interpretation ==
The phrase "Karn Evil" is sound-alike (homophonous) with the word "carnival". The story of "Karn Evil 9" is told in three parts, with the second part being an instrumental interlude. First Impression, Part 1 begins with a tale of a bleak world (although timeframe is not specified): "Cold and misty morning I heard a warning borne on the air ..." and where humanity is either being destroyed or has fallen into decay and helplessness. First Impression, Part 2 tells how the decadence of the old world is preserved through exhibits that are part of a futuristic carnival show, which exhibits depravities like "seven virgins and a mule", along with things that are rare in the future, such as a "real blade of grass".

Unlike the rest of "Karn Evil", the Second Impression's instrumentation is primarily piano, bass, and drums with a solo by Emerson on a Minimoog set to imitate a steelpan. (Part of the solo very briefly quotes the main melody from Sonny Rollins's "St. Thomas".) This impression changes from an upbeat out-of-control tune to a slow interval and then picks up the pace with a structure similar to that of a sonata. It is allegedly about computers scheming against the humans, and the humans completely not suspecting this.

The Third Impression continues the story begun in the first, describing a war between humans and computers, which can be interpreted in three different ways. One interpretation gives the victory to the humans, who reimpose their dominion over the computers. The second interpretation allows victory to the computers, claiming that the computers were successful in dominating the humans and let them live only for the sake of gloating. The third interpretation, consistent with Peter Sinfield's original interpretation that "what [Man had] invented ironically takes him over" has humans winning a war with the help of computers, only to find the computers taking over in the moment of victory.

== Writing credits and vocals ==
- First Impression: Music by Keith Emerson, vocals and lyrics written by Greg Lake.
- Second Impression: Music by Emerson.
- Third Impression: Music by Emerson, lyrics by Lake and Peter Sinfield, vocals by Lake, computerized vocals by Emerson.

There is some disagreement as to how much of the lyrics were written by Sinfield: all credits listed show that Lake wrote the lyrics for First Impression alone, but Sinfield himself implies that he co-wrote all lyrics in "Karn Evil 9".

== Reception ==
In his History of Progressive Rock, Paul Stump bemoaned that "Karn Evil 9" spends most of its length "ping-ponging frustratingly between the inspired and the intolerable", citing the subdued yet menacing Hammond organ introduction and the group workout during the Third Impression ("full of vigorous and fertile riff-development and fierce, diamond-hard textures") as examples of the former and the bipartite structure of the First Impression, the over-indulgence of Emerson's solo, and the trite science fiction theatrics of the Third Impression as examples of the latter. In 2005 Music Week listed the song on their "Top 10 Prog Tracks".

== Other uses ==
Part or all of the song is included on several of Emerson, Lake & Palmer's live albums, including:

- Welcome Back, My Friends, to the Show That Never Ends ∽ Ladies and Gentlemen (1974), which uses a phrase from the song in its title – all three impressions
- Live at the Royal Albert Hall (rec. 1992, rel. 1993) – 1st Impression, Part 2
- King Biscuit Flower Hour: Greatest Hits Live (rec. 1974, rel. 1997) – 1st Impression, Part 2
- Live in Poland (1997) – 1st Impression, Part 2
- Then and Now (rec. 1974 and 1997–98, rel. 1998) – two versions of 1st Impression, Part 2, and a version of 3rd Impression
- The Original Bootleg Series from the Manticore Vaults (rel. 1974–93, rel. 2001–06) – several versions in a multi-volume set
- A Time and a Place (rec. 1974, rel. 2010) – all three impressions
- High Voltage (2010) – 1st Impression, Part 2
- In the Hot Seat (2017 Deluxe Edition, rec. 1997–98, rel. 2017) – 1st Impression, Part 2

Part or all of the song is also included on all of the group's compilation albums and box sets.

Super Bowl XXII uses a soundalike with near identical lyrics before the "A Twist of Orange" halftime show

First Impression Part 2 was used as the theme tune for the BBC's Jim Davidson's Generation Game during the late 1990s and early 2000s, with the vocals regarding seven virgins and a mule being omitted. British Radio show host Alan Freeman also used the "welcome back my friends to the show that never ends" line as a jingle.

In September 2007, First Impression Part 2 was included in a commercial for Dr Pepper.

It is also used as the intro for the Hard Rock Park website, and for the introduction of Stockton Thunder.

The song was covered by guitarist Paul Gilbert on his live album Beehive Live, and in the end of his instructional video Guitars from Mars II.

The intro of "Zombies, March!" by shock rock/thrash metal band Gwar is based on this song.

The Blue Devils Drum & Bugle Corps used Karn Evil 9 for a drum break in their 1984 and 1985 programs.

It was a favorite of the 1986 World Champion New York Mets baseball team and played in the clubhouse and Shea Stadium before games. It was also used on their official 1986 season highlights home video.

Bon Jovi used it as a lead in to their 1988-90 New Jersey Syndicate Tour once the lights went out before their show.

First Impression Part 2 is heard in the Freaks and Geeks episode "The Garage Door".

Selections from Karn Evil 9 were featured in Pride of Cincinnati's 2004 program, "Sideshow: Alive on the Inside". The program won the bronze medal at that year's Winter Guard International World Championships in San Diego.

In February 2020, Radar Pictures announced a science fiction film inspired by Karn Evil 9 was in development, with Daniel H. Wilson to adapt the song into a screenplay.

In 2026, country music group Zac Brown Band performed a reworked version of First Impression Part 2 as the intro song for NBC's Sunday Night Baseball.
