= Richard Fraser (lyricist) =

Richard Fraser was a lyricist for the British progressive rock band Emerson, Lake & Palmer (ELP).

He received credit for "Knife-Edge", the third track of the group's 1970 debut album Emerson, Lake & Palmer, and for his lyrical contributions to Pictures at an Exhibition (1971). Fraser and bassist Greg Lake wrote the lyrics together, while Keith Emerson added some improvisations on the Hammond organ. (Lake worked with non-performing lyricists before and after this, notably Peter Sinfield.)

Most of the music to "Knife-Edge" was borrowed from the first movement of Leoš Janáček's Sinfonietta (1926), except for the organ solo section, which is a note-for-note quotation of the Allemande of Bach's 1st French Suite in D minor, BWV 812. On the original Cotillion Records USA release of the Emerson, Lake & Palmer LP, "Knife-Edge" was credited entirely to Emerson, Lake and Fraser without any mention of Janáček or Bach; however, on the British Manticore LP re-release, Sinfonietta and Janáček were listed in the album credits, including on the back cover, and Keith Emerson has often mentioned the French Suite quote, including in the 1977 Keyboard Magazine interview. Re-issues of Emerson, Lake & Palmer on compact disc have used the older credits.

Greg Lake said of Fraser in March 1972: "He was a roadie, a roadie's roadie, called 'Dynamite Legs.' We got to be good friends with him. He helped one day with the words, so we gave him the credit. We only gave him credit. We never gave him any money." Prior to Emerson, Lake & Palmer, Fraser was a roadie for King Crimson (which also included Lake in its lineup), and he later became a roadie for Genesis.
