= Greg Lake =

English musician (1947–2016)

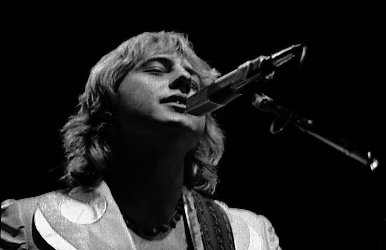
- Lake performing in 1978

Background information
- Born: Gregory Stuart Lake; 10 November 1947; Poole, Dorset, England
- Died: 7 December 2016 (aged 69) London, England
- Genre: Progressive rock
- Occupations: Musician; singer; songwriter; producer
- Instruments: Vocals; bass; guitar
- Years active: 1964–2016
- Labels: Manticore; Island; Chrysalis; Atlantic
- Formerly of: Unit Four; the Time Checks; the Shame; the Shy Limbs; the Gods; King Crimson; Emerson, Lake & Palmer; Asia; Emerson, Lake & Powell; Ringo Starr & His All-Starr Band

Gregory Stuart Lake (10 November 1947 – 7 December 2016) was an English musician, singer, and songwriter. He gained prominence as a founding member of the progressive rock bands King Crimson and Emerson, Lake & Palmer (ELP).

Born and brought up in Dorset, Lake began to play the guitar at the age of 12 and wrote his first song, "Lucky Man", at the same age. He became a full-time musician at 17, playing in several rock bands until his friend and fellow Dorset guitarist Robert Fripp invited him to join King Crimson as lead singer and bassist. They found commercial success with their influential debut album, In the Court of the Crimson King (1969).

Lake left the band in 1970 and achieved significant success in the 1970s and beyond as the singer, guitarist, bassist, and producer of ELP. As a member of ELP, Lake wrote and recorded several popular songs including "Lucky Man" and "From the Beginning". Both songs entered the UK and US singles charts. Lake launched a solo career, beginning with his 1975 single "I Believe in Father Christmas" which reached number two in the UK (behind Queen's "Bohemian Rhapsody"). He went on to release three solo albums with his Greg Lake Band and guitarist Gary Moore, recorded 1981 through 1983 (two studio albums, one live album). He was also briefly but notably a member of pop rock band Asia in 1983, replacing vocalist/bassist John Wetton (another former member of King Crimson) for three concerts in Tokyo. As well as collaborating and performing with other artists and with various groups in the 1980s, he had occasional ELP reunions in the 1990s and in 2010, and toured regularly as a solo artist into the 21st century.

Lake also sponsored other artists, producing their recordings and helping them to get recording contracts. He also was a fundraiser for the National Center for Missing & Exploited Children. In 2026, Loudwire ranked him as the 5th greatest progressive rock singer of all time. He died on 7 December 2016 in London, of pancreatic cancer, at the age of 69.

== Early life ==
Gregory Stuart Lake was born on 10 November 1947 in the Parkstone area of Poole in Dorset, to Harry, an engineer, and Pearl, a housewife. He grew up in the residential suburb of Oakdale. Speaking about his childhood, Lake said he was "born in an asbestos prefab housing unit" into a "very poor" family, and remembered several cold winters at home, but credits his parents for sending him money and food during his time as a struggling musician. He later described his upbringing as a happy one.

Lake discovered rock and roll in 1957 when he bought Little Richard's "Lucille". At the age of 12, he first learned to play the guitar and wrote his first song, "Lucky Man", which he didn't write down, simply committing it to memory. He named his mother, a pianist, as his initial musical influence and she bought Lake a second hand guitar to learn on. Lake then took guitar lessons from Don Strike, who had a shop in Westbourne. Strike taught him "these awful Bert Weedon things", reading musical notation exercises with violin pieces by Niccolò Paganini, and playing 1930s pop tunes, the latter of which became an influence on Lake at the time. After roughly one year with Strike, Lake ended his tuition as he wished to learn songs by the Shadows, a favourite band of his, but Strike "wouldn't have any of it". Lake's second guitar was a pink Fender Stratocaster.

Lake attended Oakdale Junior School followed by Henry Harbin Secondary Modern School, and left the latter in 1963 or 1964. He then took up work loading and unloading cargo at the Poole docks, and as a draughtsman for a short period. Lake then decided to become a full-time musician at the age of 17.

== Career ==
=== Early bands ===
Lake joined his first band, Unit Four, playing cover songs as their singer and guitarist. Following their split in 1965, Lake and Unit Four bassist Dave Genes formed another covers group, the Time Checks, until 1966. He then became a member of the Shame, where he is featured on their single, "Don't Go Away Little Girl", written by Janis Ian. During his stay in Carlisle for a gig, Lake contracted pneumonia and continued to perform on stage. His bandmates refused to drive back home that night, leaving Lake to sleep in the van where he "woke up blue ... When we got home I was nearly dead ... That was probably the worst I went through". Following a brief stint in the Shy Limbs, by 1968 Lake was involved with the Gods, based in Hatfield, which he described as "a very poor training college", but the group secured a residency at the Marquee Club in London. Lake left the group in 1968 over creative differences as the band were to enter the recording studio. Their keyboardist Ken Hensley later said that Lake "was far too talented to be kept in the background".

=== King Crimson ===
In the 1960s, Lake formed a friendship with guitarist Robert Fripp, who would later lead King Crimson. Lake and Fripp were from Dorset and both received lessons from Don Strike. Fripp saw Lake perform in Unit Four in Poole, and was asked to be a roadie for a gig at Ventnor, Isle of Wight; when no audience turned up, Lake and Fripp decided to play tunes from their guitar lessons that Strike had taught them.

In 1968 Fripp formed King Crimson after Giles, Giles and Fripp ended due to creative tensions and lack of commercial success. Michael Giles stayed as drummer and Ian McDonald joined on keyboards, flute and saxophone. Vocalist/bassist Peter Giles left the group, and was replaced by Lake. This was Lake's first time playing bass guitar; he had primarily been a guitarist for eleven years. Peter Sinfield was the band's primary lyricist, with Lake contributing some of the lyrics for their debut album In the Court of the Crimson King. After their contracted producer Tony Clarke walked away from the project, Lake produced the album. Released in October 1969, the album was an immediate commercial and critical success. Lake recalled: "There was this huge wave of response. The audiences were really into us because we were an underground thing – the critics loved us because we offered something fresh".

King Crimson supported In the Court of the Crimson King with a tour of the UK and the US, with some of the shows featuring rock band the Nice as the opening act. In San Francisco during the US tour, Lake struck up a friendship with Nice keyboardist Keith Emerson; the two shared similar musical interests, were ready to leave their respective bands, and talked about the benefits of their forming a new group together. When King Crimson returned to the UK in early 1970, Lake agreed to sing on the band's second album In the Wake of Poseidon, and appear on the music television show Top of the Pops with them, performing the song "Cat Food".

=== Emerson, Lake & Palmer ===
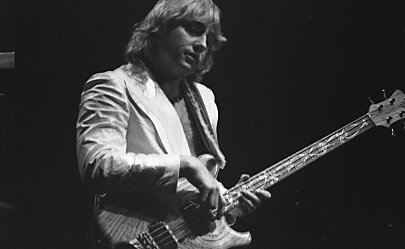
Lake performing at an Emerson, Lake & Palmer concert at Maple Leaf Gardens, Toronto, in 1978

In April 1970, Lake left King Crimson and joined with Emerson and drummer Carl Palmer of the Crazy World of Arthur Brown and Atomic Rooster, to form the progressive rock supergroup, Emerson, Lake & Palmer. Lake began with a Fender bass before he switched to a Gibson Ripper. Lake also contributed some work on acoustic and electric guitar to Emerson, Lake & Palmer, and his voice had a wider and more diverse range than anything the Nice had previously recorded. Emerson, Lake & Palmer became one of the most successful groups in the 1970s.

Lake became known for performing on an expensive Persian carpet on stage; sometimes criticized as being one of the band's lavish egocentric stagepieces, Lake stated that it served a practical purpose: it covered a rubber mat he stood on at his microphone to address his fear of electrocution after he received an electric shock from a microphone on stage. Sinfield, who stated he went with Lake to purchase the carpet, felt that this was half the story; he believed that Lake was driven to keep up with Emerson's extravagant equipment: "He was one of those classic keep-up-with-the-Joneses cases."

Emerson, Lake & Palmer conflicted between Emerson's interest in complex, classically influenced music and Lake's more straightforward rock tastes. Lake complained that Emerson chose to play in keys that were not a good fit for his voice. During the making of the band's second album Tarkus, Lake initially rejected the title track, but was persuaded to record it following a band meeting with management, which ended in the addition of an original Lake tune, "Battlefield", into the suite. Lake's track "From the Beginning", released on Trilogy in 1972, had no particular source of inspiration; "I just felt an inspiration to do it, and it flowed through me in a natural way. My hands fell upon these very unusual chords;... It was kind of a gift". It was released as a single, and reached number 39 in the US.

In 1974, Emerson, Lake & Palmer took a break in activity. Lake used this time to focus on his family life, travel, and to write and release music. By then the band were tax exiles and relocated to Switzerland, France, Canada and the Bahamas as they were restricted to two months' stay in England a year. In March 1977, the band released Works Volume 1, a double album, with each member of the group getting one side of an album for his solo music, and the fourth side for the group to work together. Lake wrote five acoustic songs with lyrical assistance from Sinfield, with a conscious effort not to record "just ballads" in favor of recording a wider variety of musical styles. He then incorporated orchestral overdubs to the songs. One of them, "C'est la Vie", was released as a single. Lake called the album the "beginning of the end" of the band, as he stopped producing their albums, neither of which were a "really innovative record". In November 1977, the band released Works Volume 2.

The band split up in 1979 following the unsuccessful album Love Beach, which the group were contractually obliged to record. The group reformed for a number of years in the mid-1990s and released two albums, Black Moon in 1992 and In The Hot Seat in 1994, before permanently disbanding except for one reunion concert in 2010 at London's High Voltage Festival.

=== Solo career and other projects ===
In 1975, while still a member of ELP, when they were on hiatus, Lake achieved solo chart success when his single, "I Believe in Father Christmas", reached number two on the UK Singles Chart. It has become a Yuletide perennial. In the UK, the single sold over 13,000 copies in two days.

Several months following the break-up of ELP in 1979, Lake began to write new songs and had "put down a tremendous amount of material" for his first solo album. He travelled to Los Angeles and worked with a group of session musicians to develop his songs further, but he found a lack of personality in the music, though not at the fault of the performers. Lake realised he wished to play as part of a group, and began to assemble members of the Greg Lake Band. The result, Greg Lake, was released in September 1981 on Chrysalis Records, and reached number 62 in both the UK and the US. The debut concert for the tour of the album took place in August 1981 at the Reading Festival, with bandmates Gary Moore on guitar, Ted McKenna on drums, Tommy Eyre on keyboards, and Tristram Margetts on bass. A concert at the Hammersmith Odeon during the tour in 1981, broadcast live on the King Biscuit Flower Hour, was released as a live album in 1995.

Lake's second solo album Manoeuvres was released in July 1983. He disbanded the Greg Lake Band soon after completing it, without promoting or touring the album, and split with his record company. Adding to the decision, lead guitarist Gary Moore had written solo material that brought him a recording contract.

In October 1983, at Carl Palmer's request, Lake briefly joined Palmer in the 1980s supergroup Asia, to replace fellow King Crimson alumnus John Wetton for four scheduled concerts in Japan. Lake agreed and spent six weeks learning Asia's songs, culminating in his performance in the "Asia in Asia" concert at the Nippon Budokan Hall in Tokyo, 6 December 1983, the first concert broadcast over satellite to MTV in the United States, and later made into a home video. Lake left the group after the tour, having joined as a favor for the Japanese concerts only.

In 1986, Lake and Emerson decided to re-form Emerson, Lake & Palmer to record another album. However, Palmer continued to have commitments to Asia, so Lake and Emerson auditioned other artists. They found good rapport with drummer Cozy Powell, and recorded their eponymous album Emerson, Lake & Powell with him.

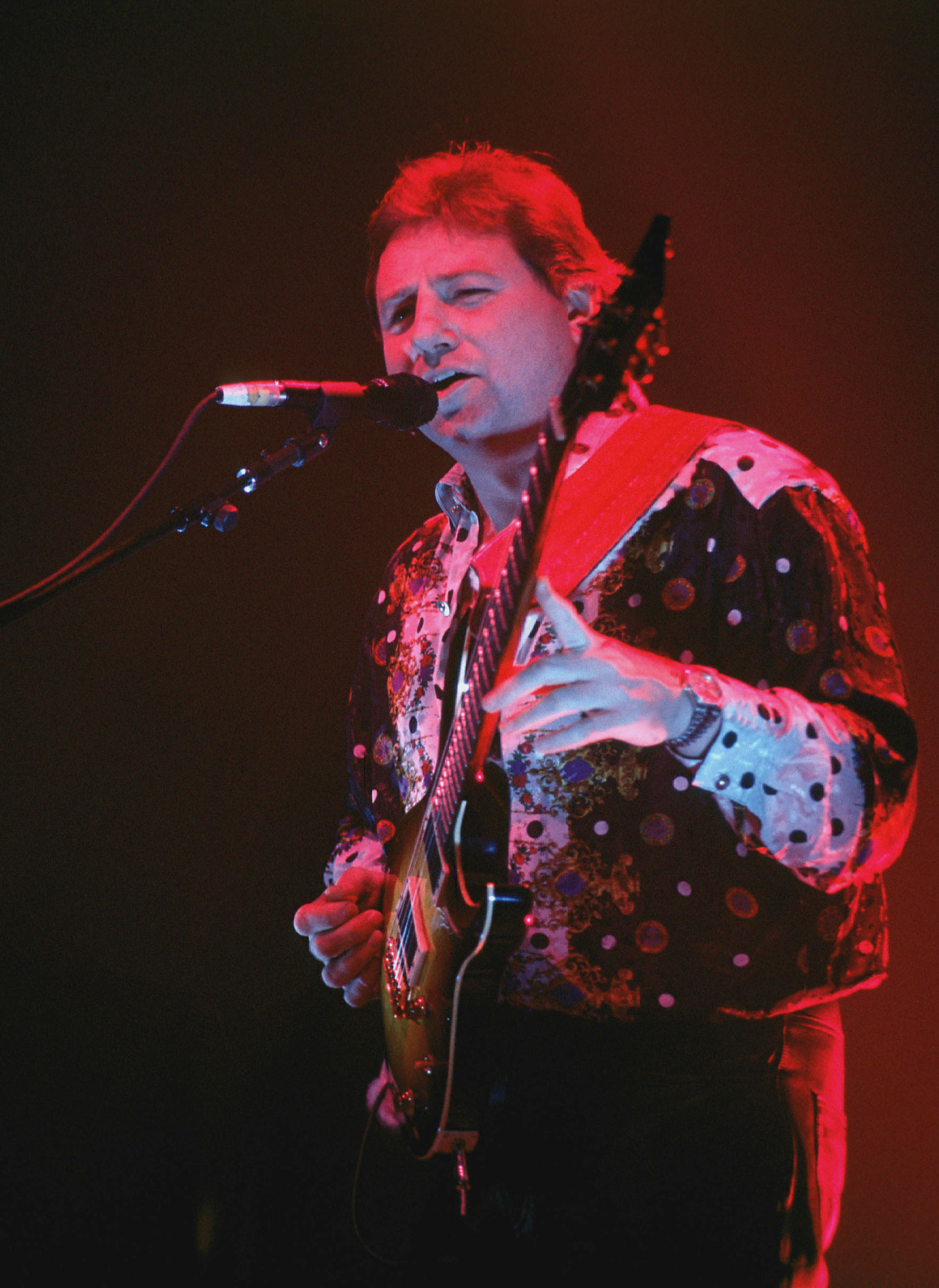
Lake in 1992, performing with ELP

In 2001, Lake toured as a member of the seventh incarnation of Ringo Starr & His All-Starr Band.

In 2003, Lake played bass on The Who song "Real Good Looking Boy". The group's usual bassist Pino Palladino was touring at the time of recording.

In 2005, Lake toured Germany and the UK with his group, the Greg Lake Band, which now included David Arch on keyboards, Florian Opahle on guitar, Trevor Barry on bass, and Brett Morgan on drums. The tour was sponsored by UK entertainer and long-term ELP fan, Jim Davidson. But the shows were not a sell-out and the US leg was cancelled.

In 2006, Lake played as a member of the supergroup the RD Crusaders in aid for charity. Lake performed "Karn Evil 9" with the Trans-Siberian Orchestra at several shows. He was a special guest on their album Night Castle (2009).

In 2010, Lake and Emerson completed an acoustic world tour, performing ELP songs. The tour got off to a bad start following a backstage altercation between the two, but "we completed the tour and it was very happy. We actually ended up enjoying ourselves". That July, Lake joined Emerson and Palmer for a one-off gig at the High Voltage Festival in Victoria Park, London, to commemorate the band's 40th anniversary. The concert was released on CD, DVD, and Blu-ray as High Voltage. It was the final performance by the group. Lake wished to continue touring, but claimed his bandmates "didn't want to", thus ending such plans.

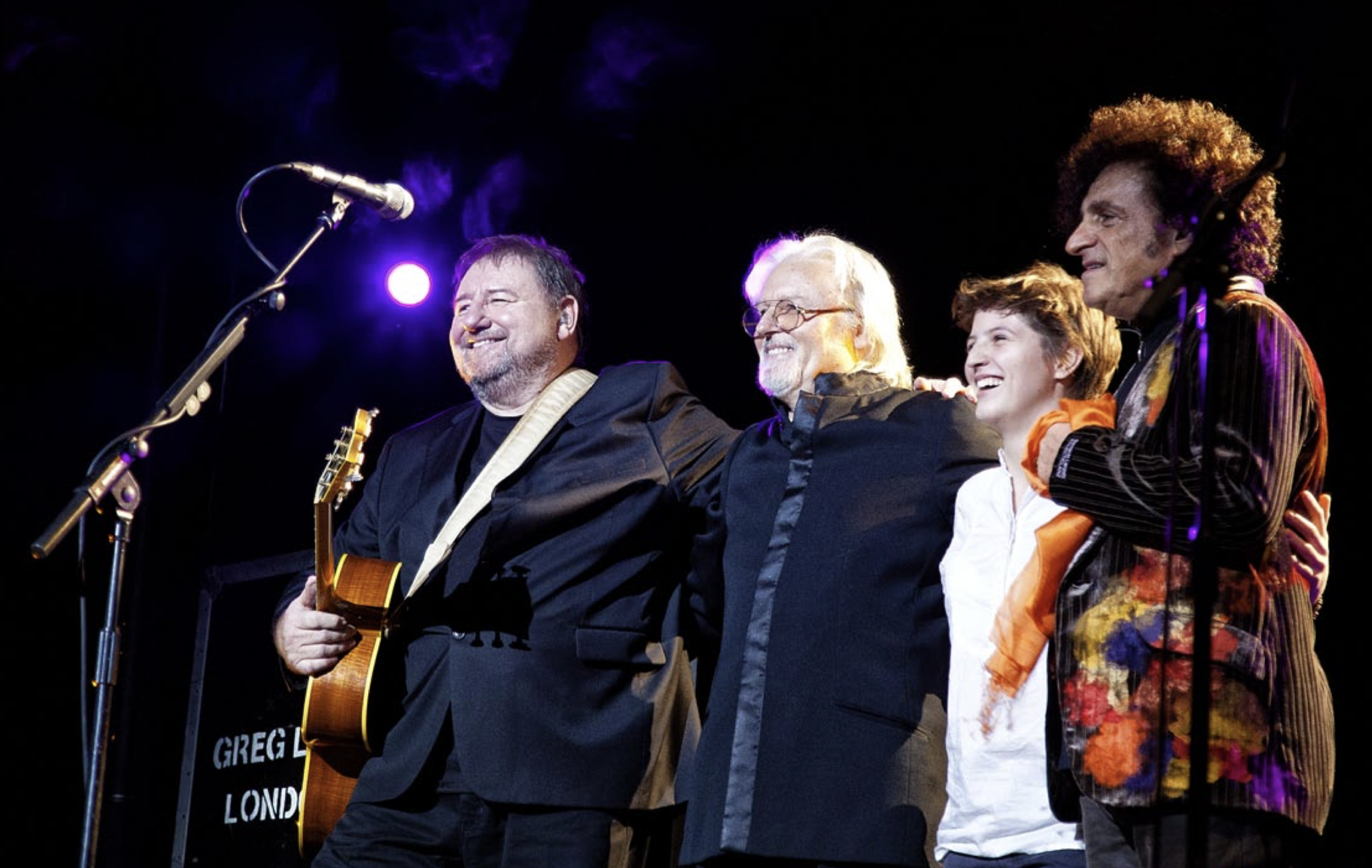
Greg and his guests on stage in Piacenza: l-r: Lake, Aldo Tagliapietra, Annie Barbazza and Bernardo Lanzetti

Lake continued to tour solo in the 2010s. His Songs of a Lifetime Tour began in 2012 which featured songs of his career and those by his favourite artists, including Elvis Presley and Johnny Kidd & the Pirates. The tour ended in December of that year and produced the live albums, Songs of a Lifetime (2013) and "Live in Piacenza" (2017).

On 9 January 2016, he was awarded an honorary degree in music and lyrics composition by Conservatorio Nicolini in Piacenza, Italy.

Lake spent several years writing his autobiography Lucky Man, originally planned to be published in 2012 but eventually released posthumously in June 2017.

On 19 June 2017, the Municipality of Zoagli (Genoa) Italy posthumously awarded honorary citizenship to Lake and engraved a marble plaque that is next to Castello Canevaro where he had performed on 30 November 2012.

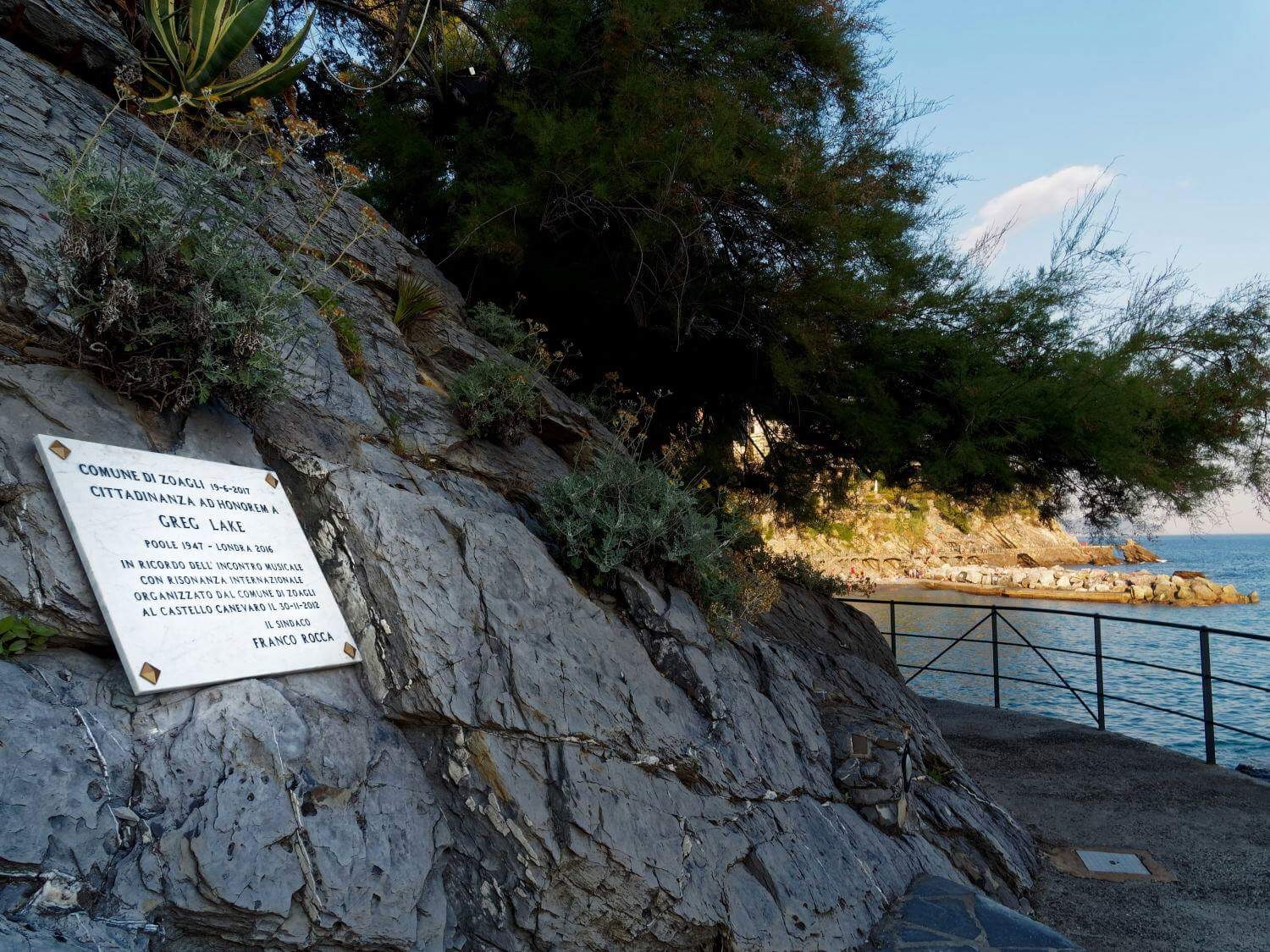
Marble plaque engraved for Greg Lake next to Castello Canevaro in Zoagli.

In his final years he worked on producing the album Moonchild by Annie Barbazza and Max Repetti, where some of his songs were arranged in an avant-garde/contemporary mood, for only piano and voice.

== Personal life and death ==
In late 1974, Lake moved from a flat in Cornwall Gardens in Kensington, London to a home near Windsor. Lake later lived in the Kingston and Richmond areas of Greater London with his wife, Regina. The couple had one daughter.

Lake was an angler who developed a friendship with television presenter Jack Hargreaves, appearing as a result in a 1980 episode of Out of Town, Hargreaves' programme about country life for Southern Television.

Lake died in London at age 69 on 7 December 2016, after suffering from pancreatic cancer. His manager described Lake's illness as "long and stubborn".

Numerous fellow musicians paid tribute, including Rick Wakeman and Steve Hackett, Ringo Starr, John Wetton, Opeth's Mikael Åkerfeldt, Ian Anderson and ELP drummer Carl Palmer.

Lake's death was nine months after the death of ELP keyboardist Keith Emerson.

== Discography ==
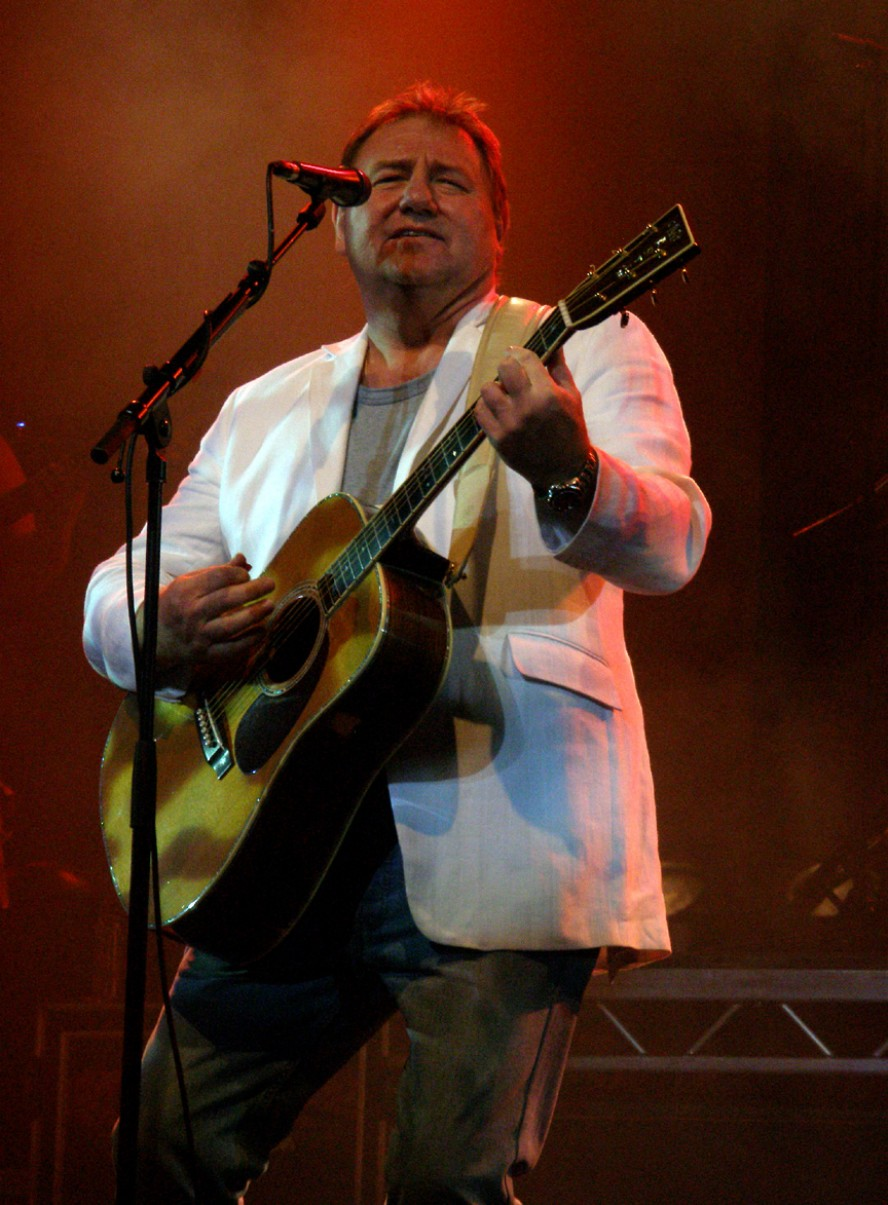
Lake, performing at Llandudno, Wales in 2005

| Released | Recorded | Artist | Title | Notes |
|---|---|---|---|---|
| 1967 | 1967 | The Shame | Don't Go Away Little Girl / Dreams Don't Bother Me | Vinyl, 7", Single |
| 1968 | 1968 | Shy Limbs | Love | Vinyl, 7", Single, B-side of "Reputation" |
| 1969 | 1969 | King Crimson | In the Court of the Crimson King | Studio album |
| 1997 | 1969 | King Crimson | Epitaph | Live album |
| 1998 | 1969 | King Crimson | Live at the Marquee | Live album, King Crimson Collector's Club |
| 2000 | 1969 | King Crimson | Live in Hyde Park | Live album, King Crimson Collector's Club |
| 2004 | 1969 | King Crimson | Live at Fillmore East | Live album, King Crimson Collector's Club |
| 1970 | 1970 | King Crimson | In the Wake of Poseidon | Studio album |
| 1970 | 1970 | Emerson, Lake & Palmer | Emerson, Lake & Palmer | Studio album |
| 1997 | 1970 | Emerson, Lake & Palmer | Live at the Isle of Wight Festival 1970 | Live album |
| 1971 | 1971 | Emerson, Lake & Palmer | Tarkus | Studio album |
| 1971 | 1971 | Emerson, Lake & Palmer | Pictures at an Exhibition | Live album |
| 2017 | 1971 | Emerson, Lake & Palmer | Masters from the Vaults | Live album |
| 1972 | 1972 | Emerson, Lake & Palmer | Trilogy | Studio album |
| 2011 | 1972 | Emerson, Lake & Palmer | Live at the Mar Y Sol Festival '72 | Live album |
| 1973 | 1973 | Emerson, Lake & Palmer | Brain Salad Surgery | Studio album |
| 1974 | 1974 | Emerson, Lake & Palmer | Welcome Back My Friends... | Live album |
| 2012 | 1974 | Emerson, Lake & Palmer | Live in California 1974 | Live album |
| 1977 | 1976 | Emerson, Lake & Palmer | Works Volume 1 | Studio album |
| 1977 | 1973-76 | Emerson, Lake & Palmer | Works Volume 2 | Studio album |
| 1978 | 1978 | Emerson, Lake & Palmer | Love Beach | Studio album |
| 2011 | 1978 | Emerson, Lake & Palmer | Live at Nassau Coliseum '78 | Live album |
| 1979 | 1977 | Emerson, Lake & Palmer | In Concert / Works Live | Live album |
| 1981 | 1981 | Greg Lake | Greg Lake | Studio album, with Gary Moore |
| 1995 | 1981 | Greg Lake | King Biscuit Flower Hour Presents Greg Lake in Concert | Live album, aka Nuclear Attack, Live, and In Concert, with Gary Moore |
| 1983 | 1983 | Greg Lake | Manoeuvres | Studio album, with Gary Moore |
| 2001 | 1983 | Asia | Enso Kai: Live in Tokyo / Live at Budokan | Live album, recorded live at the Budokan in Tokyo, Japan 6 December 1983 |
| 1986 | 1986 | Emerson, Lake and Powell | Emerson, Lake & Powell | Studio album |
| 2003 | 1986 | Emerson, Lake and Powell | The Sprocket Sessions | Recorded live at Sprocket Studio, London during the rehearsals for the 1986 world tour |
| 2003 | 1986 | Emerson, Lake and Powell | Live in Concert | Live album, recorded live at Lakeland, Florida, November 1986 |
| 2015 | 1989-90 | Greg Lake & Geoff Downes | Ride the Tiger | Studio album |
| 1992 | 1992 | Emerson, Lake & Palmer | Black Moon | Studio album |
| 1993 | 1992 | Emerson, Lake & Palmer | Live at the Royal Albert Hall | Live album |
| 2001-06 | 1971-78 / 1992 | Emerson, Lake & Palmer | The Original Bootleg Series from the Manticore Vaults | Official bootleg series |
| 1993 | 1971-93 | Emerson, Lake & Palmer | The Return of the Manticore | Box set |
| 1994 | 1994 | Emerson, Lake & Palmer | In the Hot Seat | Studio album |
| 1997 | 1997 | Emerson, Lake & Palmer | Live in Poland | Live album |
| 2013 | 1977 | Emerson, Lake & Palmer | Live in Montreal 1977 | Live album |
| 2015 | 1997 | Emerson, Lake & Palmer | Once Upon a Time: Live in South America 1997 | Live album |
| 2015 | 1997 | Emerson, Lake & Palmer | Live at Montreux 1997 | Live album |
| 1997 | 1973-74 / 1977 | Emerson, Lake & Palmer | King Biscuit Flower Hour: Greatest Hits Live | Live album |
| 1998 | 1974 / 1997-98 | Emerson, Lake & Palmer | Then and Now | Live album |
| 2007 | 2005 | Greg Lake | Greg Lake | Live album |
| 2010 | 1971-98 | Emerson, Lake & Palmer | A Time and a Place | Live Boxset |
| 2010 | 2010 | Emerson, Lake & Palmer | High Voltage | Live album |
| 2014 | 2010 | Keith Emerson & Greg Lake | Live from Manticore Hall | Live album, recorded live at Ridgefield Playhouse, Ridgefield CT on 8 May 2010 |
| 2013 | 2012 | Greg Lake | Songs of a Lifetime | Live album |
| 2017 | 2012 | Greg Lake | Live in Piacenza | Live album |

=== Solo ===
Compilations

- The Greg Lake Retrospective: From the Beginning (1997)
- From the Underground: The Official Bootleg (1998)
- From the Underground 2: Deeper Into the Mine – An Official Greg Lake Bootleg (2003)
- The Anthology: A Musical Journey (2020)
- Magical [boxed set] (2023)

Singles

- "I Believe in Father Christmas" / "Humbug" (1975), [UK #2], [US #95], BPI: Gold
- "C'est La Vie" / "Jeremy Bender" (1977) [CAN #75] [US #91]
- "Watching Over You" / "Hallowed Be Thy Name" (UK 1978)
- "Love You Too Much" / "Someone" (UK/Europe 1981)
- "For Those who dare" / "Love you too much" (Germany 1981)
- "Let Me Love You Once" / "Retribution Drive" (USA 1981) [US #48]
- "It Hurts" / "Retribution Drive" (UK/Europe 1982)
- "Famous Last Words" / "I Don't Know Why I Still Love You" (Portugal 1983)

DVDs

- Greg Lake: Live In Concert (2006)
- Welcome Backstage (2006)
- Greg Lake Live in Piacenza (2017) exclusively with the limited edition box set of the album with the same title.

=== As producer ===
- Spontaneous Combustion - "Just A Dream" {aka "Unknown Ballad" attributed to Emerson, Lake & Palmer, recorded December 1970 or January 1971, released as a bonus track on the 2012 Tarkus reissue} (2012)
- Spontaneous Combustion - Lonely Singer / 200 Lives / Leaving (1971) 7" single
- Spontaneous Combustion - self-titled (1972)
- Pete Sinfield - Still (1973)
- The King's Singers – Strawberry Fields Forever (1978) 7" single
- Annie Barbazza & Max Repetti - Moonchild (2018)
- Annie Barbazza - Vive (2020) (Track "Boite A Tisane")
