= Take a Pebble =

Song by Emerson, Lake & Palmer

from the album Emerson, Lake & Palmer
- Released: 1970
- Recorded: 1970
- Genre: Progressive rock
- Length: 12:31
- Songwriter: Greg Lake
- Producer: Greg Lake

"Take a Pebble" is a song by the British progressive rock group Emerson, Lake & Palmer. It is the second track of their eponymous debut album. It was written by Greg Lake, and arranged by the full band.

== Description ==
The song starts as a soft ballad. On the original recording it begins with Keith Emerson holding down voicing on the piano keys (without having the hammers strike the notes) while strumming the grand piano strings with a plectrum, as Greg Lake enters on electric bass guitar, and Carl Palmer on subtle percussion. Emerson then switches to fast Eb-Minor and F-Minor ascending and descending hand-over-hand piano runs in the first 8 bars of the first "A" section when Lake first enters singing "Just take a pebble and cast it to the sea".

Emerson switches back to strumming the grand piano strings with a plectrum between the first and second "A" sections, while the bass and drums play. Then, Emerson improvises behind Lake's singing in the first 8 bars of the second "A" sections. A short piano interlude leads into a composed band jazz section where the theme Lake has previously sung is developed and expanded much further (on the original recording, another piano interlude leads into strumming the grand piano strings).

The short Greg Lake folk-style acoustic guitar section that follows in the middle of the original recording, where Lake briefly switches from playing electric bass guitar, with Palmer playing water-like percussion sounds, then a rhythmic hoedown-like strummed guitar chord section, with hand-clapping on 2 and 4, followed by plucked guitar arpeggios, gives an idea of what the original style of song may have sounded like, before Emerson's arrangement of the majority of the piece. Then another piano interlude leads into a modal jazz band improvisation, followed by the "head out" and coda.

== Interpretation ==
The jazz-style sections are reminiscent in some ways of Keith Emerson's late-1960s jazz-style adaptation of "How Can We Hang On to a Dream?" (composed by American folk musician Tim Hardin) for his band The Nice. The ostinato in the left hand may have been based on a similar one from Musica ricercata, movement VII by György Ligeti.

In the earliest live versions of the piece, as seen in the Pictures at an Exhibition concert film from the Lyceum in December 1970, Lake would sing a few verses of the folk standard "Old Blue" toward the end of his acoustic guitar interlude. In later live versions of "Take a Pebble", the Greg Lake song "Lucky Man" (and later, "Still...You Turn Me On" followed by "Lucky Man" - as recorded on Welcome Back My Friends to the Show That Never Ends... Ladies and Gentlemen) was added to the Greg Lake folk-style acoustic guitar section, followed by a solo Keith Emerson jazz and blues piano medley of tunes (that the band would join in on the very end of), followed by a "Take a Pebble" band improvisation moving between F-minor and Eb-Minor (often featuring Palmer on timpani), and then the conclusion of the piece.

The Greg Lake folk-style acoustic guitar section and/or the format of inserting of other Greg Lake songs inside "Take a Pebble" was later completely dropped, and Emerson usually performs a shorter solo piano improvisation (not a medley of tunes) based on an F-minor ostinato, followed by the "Take a Pebble" band improvisation, and then the conclusion of the piece (as seen in the Emerson, Lake & Palmer - Live at Montreux 1997 DVD).

== Personnel ==
- Keith Emerson: piano
- Greg Lake: vocals, bass guitar, acoustic guitar
- Carl Palmer: drums, percussion
