= Lucky Man (Emerson, Lake & Palmer song) =

1970 single by Emerson, Lake & Palmer

Single by Emerson, Lake & Palmer

from the album Emerson, Lake & Palmer
- B-side: "Knife-Edge"
- Written: 1959 or 1960
- Released: December 1970 (Europe); February 1971 (US)
- Recorded: 1970
- Genre: Folk rock; progressive rock
- Length: 3:33 (single version); 4:37 (album version)
- Label: Island (Europe); Cotillion (US)
- Songwriter: Greg Lake
- Producer: Greg Lake

Emerson, Lake & Palmer singles chronology
"Lucky Man" (1970)	"Stones of Years" (1971)

"Lucky Man" is a song by the English progressive rock supergroup Emerson, Lake & Palmer (ELP), from the group's 1970 self-titled debut album. Written by Greg Lake when he was 12 years old and recorded by the trio using improvised arrangements, the song contains one of rock music's earliest instances of a Moog synthesizer solo. "Lucky Man" was released as a single in 1970 and reached the top 20 in the Netherlands. The song also charted in the United States and Canada. The single was re-released in 1973 and charted again in the US and Canada.

== Background and composition ==
The origin of the song, as stated by Greg Lake in interviews, is that it was the first song he wrote, when his mother bought him a guitar when he was twelve years old. With the first chords he learned (D, A minor, E minor, and G), he wrote an acoustic version of the song. In early 1968, Lake would rehearse the song with King Crimson.

The song came to be used on Emerson, Lake & Palmer's debut album when they needed one more song. Lake played the version he had written from childhood, but the rest of the band disliked it, feeling it would not fit with the other album tracks. Lake then worked on it in the studio with Carl Palmer. Lake added numerous overdubs of bass, triple-tracked acoustic guitars, electric guitar, and harmony vocals until it "sounded like a record." This version of the song — with a second electric guitar solo in place of where Emerson would later overdub his Moog solo — is featured on the album's deluxe edition.

Unlike several songs on the album, which use a distorted fuzz bass to sound like a guitar, "Lucky Man" is an acoustic ballad. The lyrics tell the story of a man who had everything, went to war, and died. A Moog synthesizer solo, recorded in one take, is performed by Keith Emerson at the end of song, making it one of the first rock compositions in which a Moog was a featured solo instrument (the Monkees were the first in 1967 with "Daily Nightly"). The solo begins as an ominous drone on a low D before leaping up two octaves and using the glide control throughout.

When asked in an interview if he felt lucky to have written the song, Lake responded, "I have been very lucky in life."

== Release and reception ==
"Lucky Man" was released in December 1970 and reached number 48 on the US Billboard Hot 100, number 25 in Canada, and number 14 in the Netherlands. The single was re-released in December 1972 and peaked at number 51 on the US Hot 100 and number 71 in Canada.

In a 1971 issue of Billboard, the song was described as being "loaded with programming appeal and should make its mark on the sales charts." Record World called it a "dazzling beauty of a song with a haunting acoustic sound and superior, intelligent lyrics." Paul Stump, in his 1997 History of Progressive Rock, remarked that "the pre-Raphaelite imagery ... is forgettable, the melody more so, and only the flanging and phasing of Emerson's Moog, flitting from one channel to the other and through a range of frequencies which augured well for future experiments with the instrument, rescues it." In a review of the 2004 film Moog, MTV's Kurt Loder said "'Lucky Man' demonstrated for delighted keyboard players everywhere that it was at last possible for them to blow amp-shredding lead guitarists right off the stage, if they so chose." Former Moog technician David Van Koevering praised "Lucky Man" as the instrument's "big breakthrough" in popular music.

Emerson, however, remained somewhat embarrassed about the song, saying "That's the solo I've had to live with!" He noted that during the recording of the solo, he was "just jamming around", and was "devastated" to learn that it was going to be used in the final version of the song without having the chance to record another take, as all the tracks had been used. When called upon to play "Lucky Man" in concerts in later years, Emerson found he was not sure how the solo went:

...late 70s I hadn't played the solo from Lucky Man for quite a long time, so I actually called up Keyboard Magazine. I knew they'd done a transcription of the solo; "do you think I could have a copy of the solo from Lucky Man?" They said "What? Keith Emerson wants a copy of..." I hadn't played it...they managed to transcribe it quite accurately...I said "it'll save me time if you send me what you came up with..." So that was it. Thank you Keyboard Magazine and Dominic Milano, I think.

== Live versus studio versions ==
"Lucky Man" is typically not performed in concert the way it was recorded. While the studio version is a full band piece (with much more input from Lake), most live versions see Lake playing the song by himself on acoustic guitar. Emerson explains:

It is a shame that we really can't perform it the same way it is on the album. There's a lot of double-tracked vocals. Greg's playing electric, bass and acoustic guitar on it. If we had really thought about it, and we ourselves, had wanted to release it as a single, then we would have considered these points, and possibly re-arranged it so we could have done it some way on stage. Now we come out and people want to hear it. Greg performs it as an acoustic piece and I guess it's rather disappointing to some people because they want to hear the recorded version. There we were, in the position of it having been released and us not knowing that people want to hear it, and the way it was done on the album being impossible for us to do on stage.

The group did attempt to recreate the studio track onstage in their earlier years, as evidenced by the band arrangement found on the album Live at the Mar y Sol Festival '72, but this was quickly dropped in favour of Lake's solo acoustic arrangement through most of ELP's touring years. A band arrangement of "Lucky Man" would become the typical live version of the song starting on the Emerson, Lake & Powell tour in 1986 and continuing after Emerson & Lake reunited with Carl Palmer in 1992 until their final performance in 2010. In some performances, the middle guitar solo is played by Lake on guitar; in others, the guitar solo is played by Emerson on organ before he switches to the Moog for the ending solo.

In a rare vocal appearance, Keith Emerson "sings" one of the song's verses through a vocoder on the rendition of "Lucky Man" appearing on Emerson, Lake & Powell's Live in Concert record. This marks his only vocal contribution to any of his music aside from the similarly computerized voice parts in "Karn Evil 9: Third Impression." Emerson's vocal part never reappears in following live performances.

== Track listing ==
7" Single

1. "Lucky Man" (Lake) – 4:35
2. "Knife-Edge" (Music: Leoš Janáček/Johann Sebastian Bach, arr. Emerson; Lyrics: Lake/Richard Fraser) – 5:04

7" Atlantic Oldies Series Single

1. "Lucky Man" (Lake) – 4:35
2. "From The Beginning" (Lake) – 4:14

== Personnel ==
- Keith Emerson – Moog synthesizer
- Greg Lake – vocals, guitars, bass
- Carl Palmer – drums, percussion

== Charts ==
Chart (1970–1971)	Peak position
Belgium (Ultratop 50 Flanders)	20
Canada Top Singles (RPM)	25
Germany (GfK)	23
Netherlands (Single Top 100)	14
US Billboard Hot 100	48
US Cashbox Top Singles	65

Chart (1972–1973)	Peak position
Canada Top Singles (RPM)	71
US Billboard Hot 100	51
US Cashbox Top Singles	63

== In popular culture ==
- The introductory track on Flower Travellin' Band's 1972 album Made in Japan is an advertisement for a concert at Stanley Park Stadium by Flower Travellin' Band; Emerson, Lake & Palmer; Bob Seger; and Teegarden & Van Winkle; with a clip of "Lucky Man" playing in the background.
- The song appears in the love scene at the end of the German film NVA (2005).
- The song is referenced in Sun Kil Moon's 2008 album April, in a song of the same name.
- In 2010, the song appears in The Simpsons episode "Million Dollar Maybe", where Homer Simpson finds an Emerson, Lake & Palmer CD and sings to the song as he drives.
- It is used as the closing theme music on CBC Radio One's The Next Chapter.
- In 2013, the song appears on American television as the background music in a Volkswagen Passat commercial.
- The song appears in the 2018 film BlacKkKlansman.
- The song also appears in the 2019 Netflix movie Extremely Wicked, Shockingly Evil and Vile.

== See also ==
- List of anti-war songs
