= Lene Lovich discography =

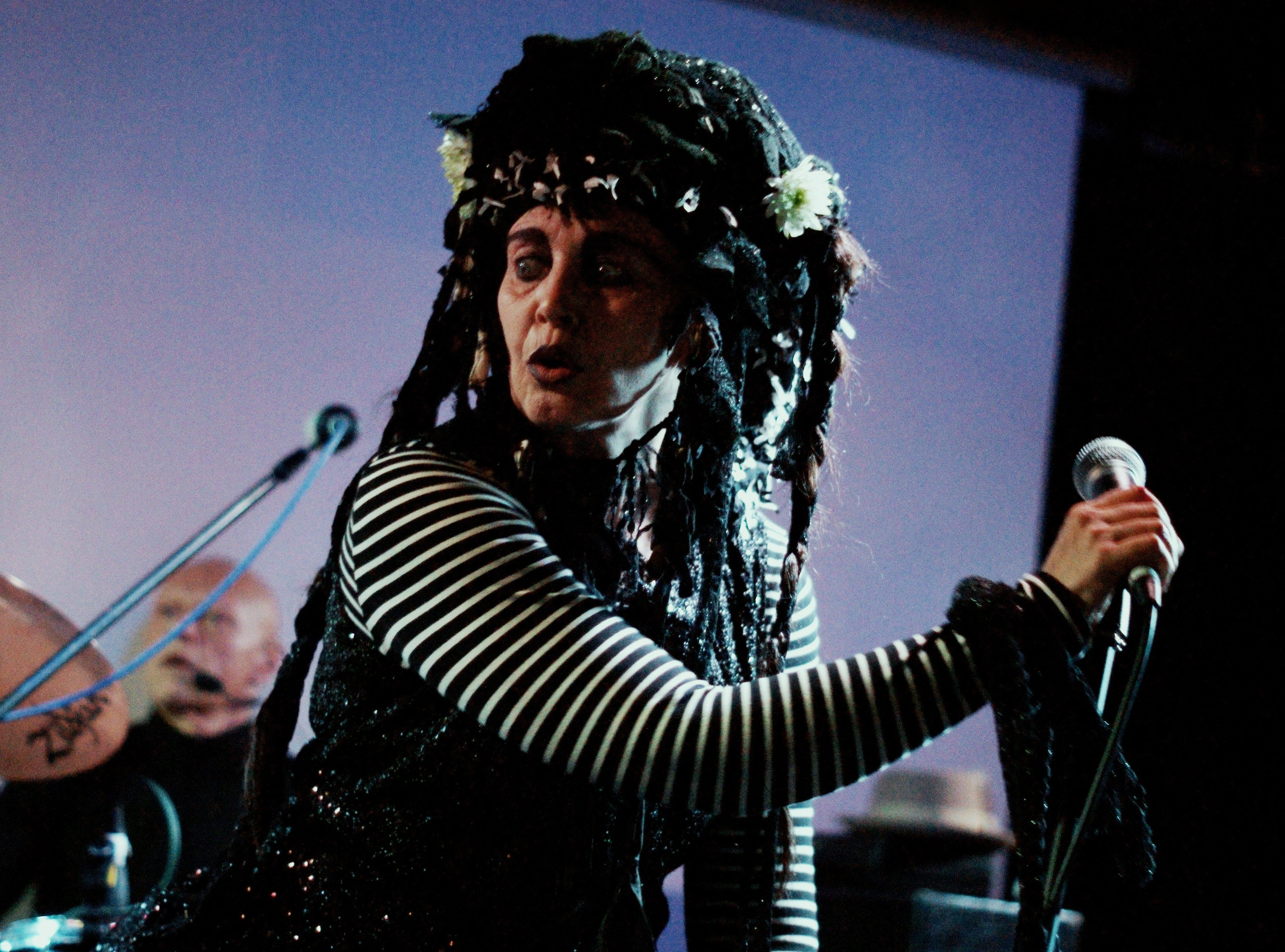
- Lovich performing in 2013
- Studio albums: 5
- EPs: 1
- Compilation albums: 10
- Singles: 19
- Video albums: 1

This is the discography of singer-songwriter Lene Lovich.

== Albums ==
=== Studio albums ===
Title	Album details	Peak chart positions							
Title	Album details	UK	AUS	CAN	GER	NL	NZ	SWE	US
Stateless	Released: 13 October 1978; Label: Stiff; Formats: LP, MC	35	13	94	—	17	19	—	137
Flex	Released: 18 January 1980; Label: Stiff; Formats: LP, MC	19	81	51	39	—	—	38	94
No Man's Land	Released: 12 November 1982; Label: Stiff; Formats: LP, MC	—	—	—	—	—	—	—	188
March	Released: October 1989; Label: Pathfinder; Formats: CD, LP, MC	—	—	—	—	—	—	—	—
Shadows and Dust	Released: 13 September 2005; Label: The Stereo Society; Formats: CD	—	—	—	—	—	—	—	—
"—" denotes releases that did not chart or were not released in that territory.

=== Compilation albums ===
Title	Album details
Hotel Blue	Released: 1982; Label: Stiff; Formats: LP; Italy-only release
Grandes Éxitos / The Hong Kong Collection	Released: 1984; Label: Stiff; Formats: LP, MC; Spain and Hong Kong-only release
The Stiff Years Volume One	Released: August 1990; Label: Great Expectations; Formats: CD
The Stiff Years Volume Two	Released: August 1990; Label: Great Expectations; Formats: CD
The Stiff Years	Released: 1993; Label: Disky; Formats: 3xCD; Benelux-only release
The Best of Lene Lovich	Released: 1995; Label: Festival, Castle Communications; Formats: CD; Australia and Germany-only release
The Best of Lene Lovich	Released: 1997; Label: Repertoire; Formats: CD; Germany-only release
The Very Best Of	Released: May 1997; Label: Disky; Formats: CD; Europe-only release
Lucky Number – The Best Of	Released: August 2004; Label: Metro; Formats: CD
Flex001	Released: 2013; Label: Flex Music; Formats: 4xCD
Toy Box: The Stiff Years 1978–1983	Released: 24 November 2023; Label: Cherry Red; Formats: 4xCD

=== Video albums ===
Title	Album details
Live from New York at Studio 54	Released: August 2007; Label: Wienerworld Presentation/MVD Visual; Formats: DVD

== EPs ==
Title	EP details
New Toy	Released: July 1981; Label: Stiff-Epic; Formats: 12", MC; North America and America-only release

== Singles ==
Title	Year	Peak chart positions									Album
Title	Year	UK	AUS	AUT	BEL (FL)	GER	IRE	NL	NZ	US Dance	Album
"I Saw Mommy Kissing Santa Claus"	1976	—	—	—	—	—	—	—	—	—	Non-album single
"I Think We're Alone Now"	1978	—	—	—	—	—	—	—	—	—	Stateless
"Lucky Number"	1979	3	2	18	5	—	7	4	3	—	Stateless
"Say When"	1979	19	—	—	14	—	26	17	–	—	Stateless
"Home" (US-only release)	1979	—	—	—	—	—	—	—	–	—	Stateless
"Bird Song"	1979	39	77	—	—	44	—	30	—	—	Flex
"Angels"	1980	—	—	—	—	—	—	—	—	—	Flex
"The Night" (US-only release)	1980	—	—	—	—	—	—	—	—	—	Flex
"What Will I Do Without You"	1980	58	—	—	—	—	—	—	—	—	Flex
"New Toy"	1981	53	29	—	—	—	—	—	—	19	New Toy (EP)
"It's You, Only You (Mein Schmerz)"	1982	68	—	—	—	—	—	—	—	25	No Man's Land
"Blue Hotel" (US and Continental Europe-only release)	1983	—	—	—	—	—	—	—	—	—	No Man's Land
"Maria" (Australia and Continental Europe-only release)	1983	—	—	—	—	—	—	—	—	—	No Man's Land
"Don't Kill the Animals" (with Nina Hagen)	1987	—	—	—	—	—	—	—	—	—	Animal Liberation
"Wonderland" (Australasia, North America and Germany-only release)	1989	—	—	—	—	—	—	—	—	21	March
"Make Believe" (Australia-only release)	1990	—	—	—	—	—	—	—	—	—	March
"Hold On to Love" (Australia-only release)	1990	—	—	—	—	—	—	—	—	—	March
"Shapeshifter" (with Comical Brothers)	1999	—	—	—	—	—	—	—	—	—	Non-album singles
"Retrospective" (with Morgan King)	2018	—	—	—	—	—	—	—	—	—	Non-album singles
"—" denotes releases that did not chart or were not released in that territory.
