= List of songs recorded by Lene Lovich =

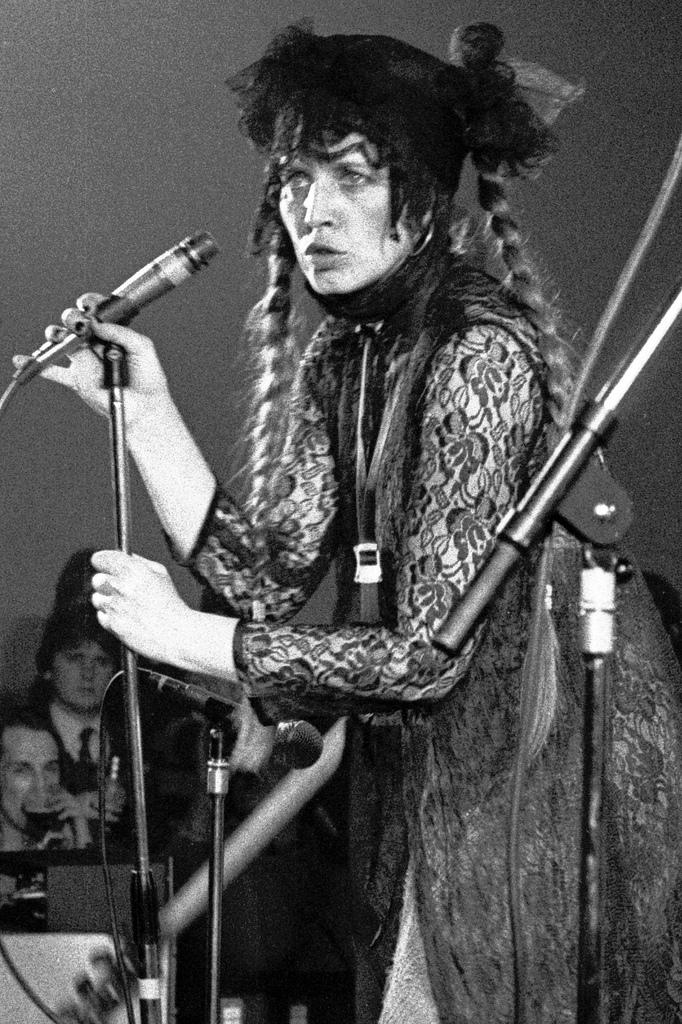
Lene Lovich performing at Bradford University Communal Building in 1979.

This is an alphabetical list of songs recorded by singer Lene Lovich. The list includes which album or single the song was featured on and the year in which it was first released.

To date, Lene Lovich has released five studio albums from 1978 to 2006 and has also recorded numerous non-album songs.

== List of songs ==
Key
†	Indicates single release

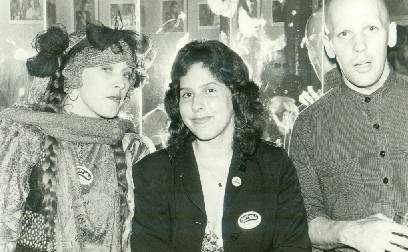
Les Chappell (right), who co-wrote the majority of songs recorded by Lene Lovich

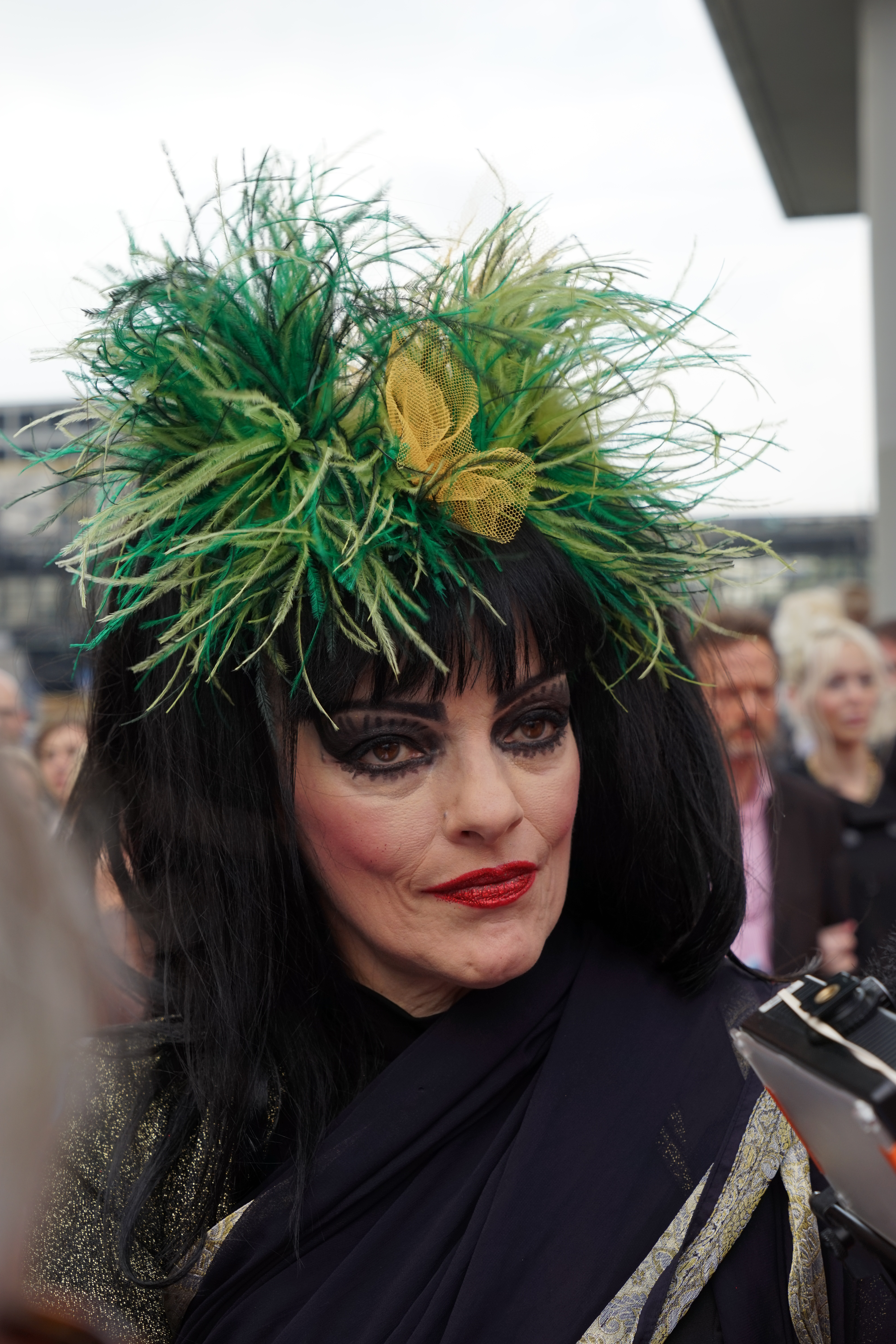
Nina Hagen, who recorded the songs "I Love You Like I Love Myself" and "Don't Kill the Animals" with Lene Lovich.

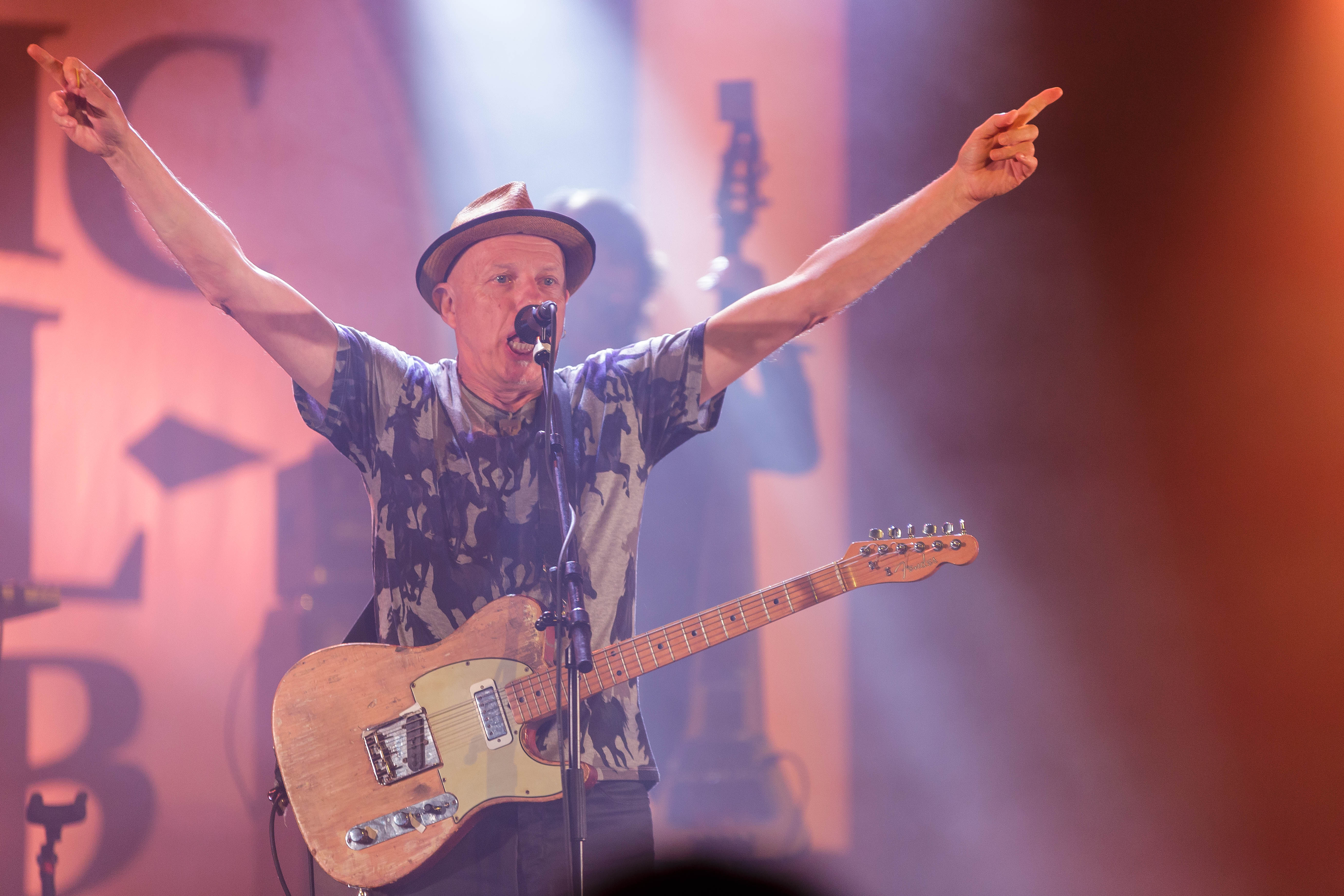
Jimme O'Neill, who wrote the songs "Say When", "Telepathy", "Never Never Land" and "Sister Video".

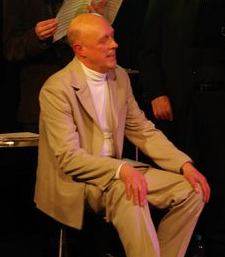
Judge Smith, who wrote the songs "What Will I Do Without You?", "You Can't Kill Me" and "The Fall".

Name of song, writers, album and year of release
Song	Writer(s)	Album or Single	Year	Ref.
"Alpha Girls"		Flex001 (Box Set)	2013	
"Angels" †	Lene Lovich, Les Chappell	Flex	1979	
"Bach" (Thorne featuring Lene Lovich)	Mike Thorne	Thorne Presents The Contessa's Party	2005	
"Be Stiff"	Devo	Be Stiff Tour	1979	
"Big Bird"	Lene Lovich, Les Chappell	"Say When" (12" single)	1979	
"Bird Song" †	Lene Lovich, Les Chappell	Flex	1979	
"Blue"	Lene Lovich, Les Chappell	"It's You, Only You (Mein Schmertz)"	1982	
"Blue Hotel" †	Lene Lovich, Les Chappell, Mauro Goldsand	No Man's Land	1982	
"Breakin' The Rules (What Do You Do When Opposites Attract)"	Jonathan Elias	Tuff Turf (Soundtrack)	1985	
"Can Catch" (Thorne featuring BETTY and Lene Lovich)	Mike Thorne, Alyson Parmer, Amy Ziff, Elizabeth Ziff	Thorne Presents The Contessa's Party	2005	
"Cat's Away"	Lene Lovich, Les Chappell	New Toy E.P.	1981	
"Craze"	Lene Lovich, Les Chappell, Julian Standen, Heathcote Williams	Shadows and Dust	2005	
"Dancing with B" (Thorne featuring Lene Lovich and Sarah Jane Morris)	Mike Thorne, Sarah Jane Morris	Thorne Presents The Contessa's Party	2005	
"Details"	Lene Lovich, Les Chappell	New Toy E.P.	1981	
"Don't Kill the Animals" † (with Nina Hagen)	Karl Rucker, Nina Hagen, Lene Lovich	"Don't Kill the Animals"	1986	
"Egghead"	Lene Lovich, Les Chappell	Flex	1979	
"Faces"	Lene Lovich, Les Chappell	No Man's Land	1982	
"Fire" (Thorne featuring BETTY, Lene Lovich and Arthur Brown)	Arthur Brown, Mike Finesilver, Peter Kar, Vincent Crane	Thorne Presents The Contessa's Party	2005	
"Ghost Story"	Lene Lovich, Les Chappell	Shadows and Dust	2005	
"Gothica"	Lene Lovich, Les Chappell	Shadows and Dust	2005	
"Happy Christmas"	Lene Lovich, Les Chappell	"I Saw Mommy Kissing Santa Claus"	1976	
"Hold On to Love" †	Lene Lovich, Les Chappell	March	1989	
"Home"	Lene Lovich, Les Chappell	Stateless	1978	
"I Love You Like I Love Myself" (with Nina Hagen and Herman Brood & His Wild Romance)	Herman Brood, Nina Hagen, Lene Lovich, Les Chappell, The Wild Romance	Cha Cha (Soundtrack)	1980	
"I Saw Mommy Kissing Santa Claus" †	Tommie Connor	"I Saw Mommy Kissing Santa Claus"	1976	
"I Think We're Alone Now" †	Lene Lovich, Les Chappell	Stateless	1978	
"It's You, Only You (Mein Schmertz)" †	Ferdinand Bakker, Hugo Sinzheimer	No Man's Land	1982	
"Joan"	Lene Lovich, Les Chappell	Flex	1979	
"Life"	Lene Lovich, Les Chappell	March	1989	
"Light"	Lene Lovich, Les Chappell	Shadows and Dust	2005	
"Little Rivers"	Lene Lovich, Les Chappell	Shadows and Dust	2005	
"Lucky Number" †	Lene Lovich, Les Chappell	Stateless	1978	
"Make Believe" †	Lene Lovich, Les Chappell	March	1989	
"Maria" †	Lene Lovich, Les Chappell	No Man's Land	1982	
"Momentary Breakdown"	Lene Lovich, Les Chappell	Stateless	1978	
"Monkey Talk"	Lene Lovich, Les Chappell	Flex	1979	
"Moro Perché Non Moro" (with Giuni Russo)	Giuni Russo	Unusual	2006	
"Natural Beauty"	Lene Lovich, Les Chappell	March	1989	
"Never Never Land"	Jimme O'Neill	New Toy E.P.	1981	
"New Toy" †	Thomas Dolby	New Toy E.P.	1981	
"Nightshift"	Lene Lovich, Les Chappell	March	1989	
"O Seasons, O Castles"	Lene Lovich, Les Chappell	"Blue Hotel"	1983	
"One in a 1,000,000"	Lene Lovich, Les Chappell	Stateless	1978	
"One Lonely Heart"	Lene Lovich, Les Chappell	"Say When"	1979	
"Rage"	Lene Lovich, Les Chappell	March	1989	
"Remember"	Lene Lovich, Les Chappell	Shadows and Dust	2005	
"Retrospective" † (with Morgan King)		"Retrospective"	2018	
"Rocky Road"	Lene Lovich, Les Chappell	No Man's Land	1982	
"Sanctuary"	Lene Lovich, Les Chappell	Shadows and Dust	2005	
"Savages"	Lene Lovich, Les Chappell	New Toy E.P. and No Man's Land	1981	
"Say When" †	Jimme O'Neill	Stateless	1978	
"Shadow Walk"	Lene Lovich, Les Chappell	March (CD and Cassette pressings)	1989	
"Shape Shifter"	Lene Lovich, Les Chappell	Shadows and Dust	2005	
"Sharman"	Lene Lovich, Les Chappell	March	1989	
"Sister Video"	Jimme O'Neill	No Man's Land	1982	
"Sleeping Beauty"	Lene Lovich, Les Chappell	Stateless	1978	
"Special Star"	Lene Lovich, Les Chappell	New Toy E.P. and No Man's Land	1981	
"Supernature"	Lene Lovich, Les Chappell	Animal Liberation	1987	
"Telepathy"	Jimme O'Neill	Stateless	1978	
"The Christmas Song (Merry Christmas to You)"	Robert Wells, Mel Torme	"I Saw Mommy Kissing Santa Claus"	1976	
"The Fall"	Judge Smith	"Angels" (12" single)	1980	
"The Fly"	Lene Lovich, Les Chappell	"Angels"	1980	
"The Freeze"	Lene Lovich, Les Chappell	Flex	1979	
"The Insect Eater"	Lene Lovich, Les Chappell	Shadows and Dust	2005	
"The Night" †	Bob Gaudio, Al Ruzicka	Flex	1979	
"The Wicked Witch"	Lene Lovich, Les Chappell, Achim Mennicken, Michael Bulgrin	Shadows and Dust	2005	
"Things I Didn't Say" (Thorne featuring Lene Lovich and Sarah Jane Morris)	Shel Silverstein	Thorne Presents The Contessa's Party	2005	
"Tonight"	Nick Lowe	Stateless	1978	
"Too Tender (To Touch)"	Lene Lovich, Les Chappell	Stateless	1978	
"Trixi"	Lene Lovich, Les Chappell	"Bird Song"	1979	
"Vertigo"	Lene Lovich, Les Chappell	March (CD and Cassette pressings)	1989	
"Walking Low"	Lene Lovich, Les Chappell	No Man's Land	1982	
"What Will I Do Without You?" †	Judge Smith	Flex	1979	
"Wonderful One"	Lene Lovich, Les Chappell	Flex	1979	
"Wonderland" †	Lene Lovich, Les Chappell, Chris Bradford, Andy Scott	March	1989	
"Writing on the Wall"	Lene Lovich, Les Chappell	Stateless	1978	
"You Can't Kill Me"	Judge Smith	Flex	1979	
