= Toy Box: The Stiff Years 1978–1983 =

Box set by Lene Lovich
- Released: 24 November 2023
- Recorded: 1978–1983
- Genre: New wave
- Length: 4:58:39
- Label: Cherry Red Records
- Producer: Lene Lovich; Les Chappell; Roger Bechirian; Alan Winstanley

Toy Box: The Stiff Years 1978–1983 is box set by singer-songwriter Lene Lovich released through Cherry Red Records in 2023. It contains all of the studio albums she released through Stiff Records from 1978 to 1983 along with bonus b-sides, remixes and live tracks.

== Background ==
Lene Lovich released three albums with Stiff Records; Stateless in 1978, Flex in 1980, and No Man's Land in 1983. She also released an extended play titled New Toy in 1981.

Toy Box contains all three albums, including the rare original version of Stateless that was released in October 1978 before it was replaced by the remixed version released in 1979 following the success of the single "Lucky Number". A total of 81 tracks were included in the box, with 20 making their debut on compact disc. According to Cherry Red Records the box set marked the first time that "everything Lene Lovich released for Stiff Records between 1978 and 1983" was collected together.

The box set was packaged in a clamshell box, with each disc housed in a card sleeve and a 24-page booklet with liner notes included.

== Track listing ==
All track list information taken from the box set's liner notes.

Disc 1 – Stateless (Original Mix) (1978) (SEEZ 7) with 11 extra tracks
No.	Title	Original release	Length
1.	"Lucky Number"		3:13
2.	"Sleeping Beauty"		3:30
3.	"Home"		3:42
4.	"Too Tender (To Touch)"		4:20
5.	"Say When"		2:48
6.	"Tonight"		4:34
7.	"Writing on the Wall"		3:35
8.	"Telepathy"		2:48
9.	"Momentary Breakdown"		3:04
10.	"1 in a 1,000,000"		2:51
11.	"I Think We're Alone Now"		2:46
12.	"Lucky Number" (Early version)	"I Think We're Alone Now" single (BUY 32)	2:21
13.	"I Think We're Alone Now" (Japanese version)	"I Think We're Alone Now" Japanese language single (BUY J32)	2:47
14.	"Monkey Talk" (Early version)	Stiff Sounds - Can't Start Dancin' compilation (SOUNDS 3)	3:28
15.	"Be Stiff"	Be Stiff Tour album (ODD 2)	2:40
16.	"Be Stiff" (The Entire Ensemble Live at Leeds University)	Be Stiff Tour album (ODD 2)	5:17
17.	"Lene Lovich Speaks 1"	Lene Lovich Speaks promo (LENE 1)	0:06
18.	"Lucky Number" (Instrumental version)	"Lucky Number" 12-inch single (S12 BUY 42)	2:50
19.	"One Lonely Heart"	"Say When" single (BUY 46)	3:21
20.	"Big Bird"	"Say When" 12-inch single (12 BUY 46)	3:27
21.	"Lene Lovich Speaks 2"	Lene Lovich Speaks promo (LENE 1)	1:48
22.	"Lucky Number" (Slavic Dance version)	"Lucky Number" U.S. single (AS 618)	4:32
Total length:			1:10:00

Disc 2 – Stateless (Remixed version) (1979) (JE 36102) with 10 extra tracks
No.	Title	Original release	Length
1.	"Home" (Remix)		3:41
2.	"Sleeping Beauty" (Remix)		3:00
3.	"Lucky Number" (Remix)		2:47
4.	"Too Tender (To Touch)" (Remix)		4:08
5.	"Say When" (Remix)		2:50
6.	"Writing on the Wall" (Remix)		3:10
7.	"Telepathy" (Remix)		2:46
8.	"Momentary Breakdown" (Remix)		3:20
9.	"I Think We're Alone Now"		2:45
10.	"One in a 1,000,000"		2:52
11.	"Tonight" (Remix)		4:32
12.	"Trixi"	"Bird Song" single (BUY 53)	2:28
13.	"The Fly"	"Angels" single (BUY 63)	3:00
14.	"The Fall"	"Angels" 12-inch single (BUYIT 63)	3:41
15.	"Monkey Talk" (Live at the Lyceum, 03.02.1980)	"What Will I Do Without You" single (BUY 69)	3:15
16.	"The Night" (Live at the Lyceum, 03.02.1980)	"What Will I Do Without You" single (BUY 69)	4:14
17.	"Too Tender (To Touch)" (Live at the Lyceum, 03.02.1980)	"What Will I Do Without You" single (BUY 69)	4:13
18.	"You Can't Kill Me" (Live at the Lyceum, 03.02.1980)	"What Will I Do Without You" single (BUY 69)	3:40
19.	"Angels" (Live at Paradise Theater, 15.03.1980)	1980 Global Assault: Recorded Live In London And Boston promo (AS 769)	3:07
20.	"Lucky Number" (Live at Paradise Theater, 15.03.1980)	1980 Global Assault: Recorded Live In London And Boston promo (AS 769)	6:04
21.	"Home" (Live at Paradise Theater, 15.03.1980)	1980 Global Assault: Recorded Live In London And Boston promo (AS 769)	7:42
Total length:			1:17:27

Disc 3 – Flex (1980) (SEEZ 19) with 10 extra tracks
No.	Title	Original release	Length
1.	"Bird Song"		4:29
2.	"What Will I Do Without You"		3:36
3.	"Angels"		3:09
4.	"The Night"		4:32
5.	"You Can't Kill Me"		3:45
6.	"Egghead"		2:28
7.	"Wonderful One"		4:29
8.	"Monkey Talk"		3:24
9.	"Joan"		3:19
10.	"The Freeze"		4:45
11.	"The Night" (U.S. Remix)	"The Night" U.S. single (9-50866)	3:58
12.	"What Will I Do Without You" (Single version)	"What Will I Do Without You" single (BUY 69)	3:07
13.	"Bird Song" (Edit)	"New Toy" Japanese 12-inch single (VIP-5908)	4:01
14.	"Details" (Original version)	Riding High soundtrack (JAM 2)	3:11
15.	"New Toy"	"New Toy" single (BUY 97)	3:18
16.	"Cats Away" (Single version)	"New Toy" single (BUY 97)	3:41
17.	"New Toy" (Extended version)	"New Toy" 12-inch single (BUY IT 97)	4:38
18.	"Cats Away" (EP version)	New Toy EP (5E 37452)	3:41
19.	"Details"	New Toy EP (5E 37452)	3:10
20.	"Never Never Land"	New Toy EP (5E 37452)	4:04
Total length:			1:14:52

Disc 4 – No Man's Land (1983) (SEEZ 44) with 9 extra tracks
No.	Title	Original release	Length
1.	"It's You, Only You (Mein Schmerz)"		3:55
2.	"Blue Hotel"		3:45
3.	"Faces"		3:35
4.	"Walking Low"		3:22
5.	"Special Star"		4:42
6.	"Sister Video"		4:50
7.	"Maria"		3:05
8.	"Savages"		3:43
9.	"Rocky Road"		6:43
10.	"Savages" (EP version)	New Toy EP (5E 37452)	3:49
11.	"Special Star" (EP version)	New Toy EP (5E 37452)	3:10
12.	"Blue Hotel" (Single version)	"Blue Hotel" Italian single (REMO 1)	3:10
13.	"It's You, Only You (Mein Schmerz)" (Remixed Extended version)	"It's You, Only You (Mein Schmerz)" U.K. 12-inch single (BUYIT 164)	5:33
14.	"Blue"	"It's You, Only You (Mein Schmerz)" single (BUY 164)	3:00
15.	"It's You, Only You (Mein Schmerz)" (Instrumental version)	"It's You, Only You (Mein Schmerz)" U.K. 12-inch single (BUYIT 164)	5:45
16.	"It's You, Only You (Mein Schmerz)" (U.S. Extended Dance Remix)	"It's You, Only You (Mein Schmerz)" U.S. 12-inch single (49-03342)	5:39
17.	"Blue Hotel" (U.S. Dance Mix)	"Blue Hotel" U.S. 12-inch single (49-03799)	5:19
18.	"O Seasons O Castles"	"Blue Hotel" German single (6.13741 AC)	3:05
Total length:			1:16:20

== Charts ==
Chart (2023)	Peak position
UK Independent Albums Chart (OCC)	33

== Credits ==
Taken from liner notes.

- Project Management: Michael Robson
- Design: Michael Robson (Another Planet Music)
- Audio Remastering: Scott Davies (Rubellan Remasters LLC) (February 2023)
- Sleeve Notes: Lene Lovich, Scott Davies, Michael Robson
- Front Cover Photo: Michael Grecco (Boston 1983)
