= Marshall Hain =

British pop-rock duo

- Origin: England
- Genre: Pop
- Works: Albums; singles
- Years active: 1978–1979
- Label: Harvest
- Members: Julian Marshall; Kit Hain

Marshall Hain were a British pop rock duo known for their 1978 hit "Dancing in the City", a UK No. 3 hit single on the UK singles chart in mid-1978 and number 3 in Australia.

== Overview ==
The duo comprised keyboard player Julian Marshall and vocalist and bass player Kit Hain, who met while they were pupils at Dartington Hall School.

"Dancing in the City", written by both members, was also a hit in Europe and Australia, where it spent 24 weeks in the Australian Charts during August through to December 1978, peaking at No.3. In the United States the song reached No. 43 on the Billboard Hot 100 chart in the winter of early 1979. "Dancing in the City" also climbed to the top of the South African singles charts that same year, receiving extensive airplay and was included on Vol 5 of the long-running compilation album series Pop Shop.

They followed this up with the ballad "Coming Home", which reached No. 39 in the UK Singles Chart later that year. Both singles were on the Harvest record label. "Coming Home" was backed by strings and fretless bass, and they released an album entitled Free Ride. In 1979 they called it quits. Free Ride peaked at number 56 in Australia.

Hain continued pursuing a recording career and released two albums in the UK: 1981's Spirits Walking Out, which included a minor hit "Danny", and 1983's School For Spies. She also had songs recorded by the Who's lead singer Roger Daltrey (four songs on three albums), Kiki Dee, and Barbara Dickson, before moving to the US in 1985. There she concentrated on her songwriting. She has written with Aimee Mann ("RIP in Heaven" and "Crash and Burn" on Til Tuesday's Everything's Different Now album), Heart and Cyndi Lauper, and had songs recorded by Peter Cetera and Chaka Khan (the top 5 AC hit "Feels Like Heaven" written with Mark Goldenberg), Cher ("Fires of Eden" also written with Goldenberg and recorded by Judy Collins), Fleetwood Mac ("Winds of Change"), as well many other recording artists, garnering chart success worldwide. Her songs also have been licensed for use in MTV's The Hills as well as network shows including The Unit and Sex and the City. She also released a third solo album, Cry Freedom, in Belgium in 1995 (Tempo/EMI). In 2012 she started a career as an author under her married name, Kit Grindstaff.

Marshall stayed in the UK and became a member of the Flying Lizards, who had a top 10 hit in both the UK and Australia with their cover of "Money (That's What I Want)" in 1979. The song reached No. 50 in the U.S.

Marshall later formed the duo Eye to Eye with singer-songwriter Deborah Berg. Eye to Eye released a single called "Am I Normal?" which was written by Marshall and Berg. This failed to chart in the UK although their song "Nice Girls" charted in the U.S., reaching No. 37 on the Billboard Hot 100 in the summer of 1982. A second song, "Lucky," reached No. 88 in the U.S. during the autumn of 1983.

"Am I Normal?" was covered by David (real name Virginia David) in 1983 on the Stiletto record label. It was produced by Andy Hill, but also failed to chart in the UK, despite being playlisted on BBC Radio 1.

== Discography ==
=== Albums ===
==== Studio albums ====
Title	Album details	Peak chart positions		
Title	Album details	AUS	GER	ICE
Free Ride	Released: July 1978; Label: Harvest; Formats: LP, MC; Released in the US as Dancing in the City	56	44	4

=== Singles ===
Title	Year	Peak chart positions												Certifications
Title	Year	UK	AUS	AUT	CAN	GER	IRE	NL	NZ	SA	SWE	SWI	US	Certifications
"Dancing in the City"	1978	3	3	6	40	1	2	14	15	1	7	4	43	BPI: Gold
"Coming Home"	1978	39	—	—	—	—	—	45	—	—	—	—	—	
"Real Satisfaction" (Australia-only release)	1979	—	—	—	—	—	—	—	—	—	—	—	—	
"Dancing in the City" (Summer City '87)	1987	81	—	—	—	—	—	—	—	—	—	—	—	
"Dancing in the City" (Summer '92 Remix)	1992	—	—	—	—	—	—	—	—	—	—	—	—	
"—" denotes releases that did not chart or were not released in that territory.
