= Spontaneous Combustion (English band) =

English progressive rock band

- Origin: Poole, Dorset, England, United Kingdom
- Genres: Progressive rock, psychedelic rock, hard rock, space rock, folk rock, country rock
- Years active: 1968–1981
- Labels: EMI, Harvest, Capitol, Lingasong
- Past members: Gary Margetts; Tris Margetts; Tony Brock; Steve Evans; Jode Leigh; Mike U'Dell; Alec Johnson; James (Jay) Sharkey; Pete Taylor

Spontaneous Combustion were an English progressive rock band formed in 1968 in Poole, Dorset, with brothers Gary Margetts (guitar, Mellotron, lead vocals) and Tris Margetts (bass, VCS3, vocals), and Tony Brock (drums, piano, vocals). The band released three albums and four singles working with producers Greg Lake, Robert Fripp, Robert Kirby, and Conny Plank before ending in 1981 when Tris Margetts became bassist in the Greg Lake Band with Gary Moore. In 2012 their albums and singles were remastered and released as deluxe reissues with reproductions of artwork, and singles that weren't previously on albums; additional deluxe reissues have released in the decade since. Their original records and artwork are collector's items.

== History ==
The band was originally formed as Transit Sound in 1968 by friends Gary Margetts and Steve Evans, joined by Tris Margetts and Tony Brock. Initially they played cover songs in local Dorset clubs but began adding their original music. In August 1970 Evans left and the band continued as a trio.

In 1970 Greg Lake, who lived in the same town, and at the time had achieved success as a member of King Crimson and had recently formed Emerson, Lake & Palmer, offered to produce the band and encouraged EMI Records to sign them. Lake also suggested a name change to Spontaneous Combustion.

The band opened for Emerson, Lake & Palmer several times in 1971-72. Their first album, Spontaneous Combustion, which was produced by Lake, was released in 1972. Their single "Sabre Dance", covering the classical composition by Aram Khachaturian, featured a guest appearance by Robert Fripp. The band's second album Triad was released later in 1972, and they supported the album with a headline appearance at the Harvest Mobile Tour Fall '72 promoted by EMI.

Drummer Tony Brock left the band in 1973 and later formed The Babys. The Margetts brothers continued the band with new drummer Jode Leigh and guitarist/singer Alec Johnson. This lineup recorded the album Time in 1975. The band broke up in 1977; their song "Spaceship" appears on the 2007 Harvest Records compilation album Picnic – A Breath of Fresh Air.

Tris Margetts was bassist of the Greg Lake Band with Gary Moore, Ted McKenna and Tommy Eyre from 1981 to 1983; the band recorded two studio albums, and the live album King Biscuit Flower Hour Presents Greg Lake In Concert recorded November 5, 1981, at the Hammersmith Odeon in London, England, that was broadcast live on the King Biscuit Flower Hour radio program. The set list included songs from the band's first album Greg Lake and Greg's King Crimson composition "21st Century Schizoid Man" as well as a mix of ELP's "Fanfare For The Common Man" and "Karn Evil 9"; Greg's ELP song "Lucky Man", and Gary Moore's "Parisienne Walkways".

The live recording has been released multiple times with various titles (including London '81), sometimes featuring songs recorded at other concerts during the band's 1981 tour of the UK, U.S. and Canada, and some releases include Greg's King Crimson song "The Court Of The Crimson King" and other selections such as Greg's Emerson, Lake & Palmer song "C'est la Vie".

In 2012, interest in Spontaneous Combustion was revived when their first recording "Just a Dream", produced by Greg Lake during recording sessions of Emerson, Lake & Palmer's 1971 album Tarkus, was inadvertently included in the 2012 deluxe reissue of Tarkus as a bonus track titled "Unknown Ballad". This unlabeled recording was discovered in the ELP archives by reissue producer Steven Wilson, who erroneously believed it to be an unreleased ELP song from the Tarkus sessions (in fact, the song featured Lake playing Keith Emerson's piano and singing harmony vocals on the chorus). After the origin of the recording came to light, the reissue was withdrawn. In 2016, Lake produced another reissue of Tarkus with the Spontaneous Combustion song included, along with an explanation of the 2012 error.

In 2020, rock historian Brett Milano included the debut Spontaneous Combustion album in his list of "Classic Albums By Young Musicians: 25 Age-Defying Greats".

== Discography ==
- Spontaneous Combustion (1972)
- Triad (1972)
- Time (1975)
