= Bird Song (Lene Lovich song) =

1979 single by Lene Lovich

"Bird Song" is a 1979 song written by Lene Lovich and Les Chappell, released as a single by Lovich, from the album Flex. It charted at 39 in the UK.
