= Chris Bradford (musician) =

British musician and songwriter

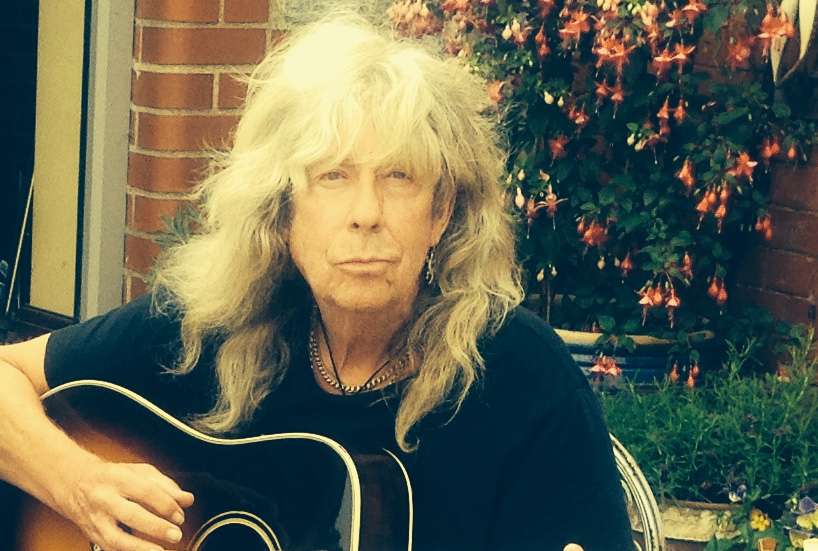
- Bradford in July 2014

Background information
- Born: Christopher Michael Bradford; 4 May 1950 (age 76); Liverpool, England
- Genres: Hard rock, folk rock
- Occupations: Musician, songwriter
- Instruments: Guitar, vocals
- Years active: 1965–present

Christopher Michael Bradford (born 4 May 1950) is a British musician and songwriter. He is best known for being the lead vocalist and songwriter in the British rock band The Heroes, and member of the singer songwriting trio, Bardot.

== Early years ==
Bradford and Mark Hankins formed the band Palomino in the early 1970s, playing the pub rock scene and university gigs supporting such acts as Osibisa and Vinegar Joe (with Elkie Brooks and Robert Palmer). The band also supported Neil Sedaka at the Albert Hall in 1972. This marked the first airing of Bradford's early songs. Hankins' next band, the country rock outfit Randy, recorded Bradford's song "Crazy Love" on their debut album Lady Luck.

== Bardot 1977–1978 ==
Bradford hooked up with Laurie Andrew (aka Laurie Forsey) and Ray McRiner to form Bardot in 1977. Each member a strong singer/songwriter, their sound, heavy on melody and complex harmonies was sometimes compared to Crosby, Stills & Nash.

The band were signed to RCA Records in 1977, and released three singles between 1977 and 1978, the debut "Witchfire" hitting number 14 in the Dutch charts. During 1977 Bardot supported Bonnie Tyler and her band in concert, and on 2 August performed "Eagle Road" and "Rockin in Rhythm" on The Elaine Simmons TV Show in Scotland. RCA released their album Rockin in Rhythm in 1978 – a collection of polished folk rock songs. 1978 also saw Bardot working at Ringo Starr's Startling Studios providing all the backing vocals for Graham Bonnet's album No Bad Habits. The album was produced by Pip Williams who collaborated extensively with Bardot and with Bradford on his later projects.

== The Heroes 1979–1981 ==
Formed in 1979, with Bradford and Mark Hankins on guitar and vocals, The Heroes line-up was completed by Pete Lennon (lead guitar), Dave Powell (drums) and ex-Randy band-member Brian (Wally) Wallis on bass guitar. Their musical style combined pop / rock ballads and boogie.

Although primarily a recording group, they undertook a tour of Germany playing the Olympianhalle in Munich, the Top Ten Club in Hamburg and a show in Berlin. In this show, the truck carrying the group's instruments did not stop and continued into Poland, forcing the group to use the equipment belonging to the band they were touring with, Dr. Feelgood.

The Heroes signed with Polydor Records in 1979, and recorded an album of ten songs, Border Raiders also produced by Pip Williams in 1980, plus a single "Some Kind of Women" b/w "10% Will Do".

== Sweet connection ==
Bradford has worked for many years with Andy Scott, guitarist and writer of Sweet who went on to have a successful solo career after glam rock. Some of Scott's solo successes came from his collaborations with Bradford: they co-wrote "Krugerrands" – a top ten hit in Australia and South Africa, "Invisible", "Let Her Dance" and many others. Bradford also worked with Sweet's lead singer Brian Connolly on his solo work.

During 1983, Bradford, Scott and producer Mike Vernon wrote a collection of songs together, intended for release by other artists. Some of the music written that summer was used in the Italian film Il Lupo di Mare.

== Covers ==
Bradford has written songs for many diverse artists such as Kit Hain, Kiki Dee, Dr. Feelgood, Lene Lovich and Greg Lake.

== Studio work ==
Bradford has provided backing vocals for many artists including Brian Connolly, Greg Lake, Dr. Feelgood, Graham Bonnet, Terry Sylvester of The Hollies, blues guitarist Ray Minhinnet, The Monroes, Breathe and Andy Scott.

== Discography ==
=== Solo ===
==== Albums ====
- 2019 – Christopher Days
- 2020 – Beachcomber
- 2022 – Winterface

=== With Bardot and The Heroes ===
==== Albums ====
- 1978 – Rockin in Rhythm – Bardot (Composer, Guitar, Vocals)
- 1980 – Border Raiders – The Heroes (Composer, Guitar, Guitar (Electric), Vocals)

==== Singles ====
- 1977 – "Witchfire" / "Hero's Reward" – Bardot
- 1978 – "Julie" / "Mountain Side" – Bardot (Netherlands)
- 1978 – "No-One Cries" / "All The Ladies" – Bardot
- 1980 – "Some Kind Of Women" / "10% Will Do" – The Heroes

=== With other artists ===
- 1978 – No Bad Habits album by Graham Bonnet – Vocals (Background, with Bardot)
- 1980 – "Take Away the Music", single by Brian Connolly – Vocals (Background)
- 1981 – "Sunnuntaiaamu" ("Julie") song on the album Armi by Armi Aavikko – composer
- 1982 – Perfect Timing album by Kiki Dee – Composer, Vocals (Background)
- 1983 – School For Spies album by Kit Hain – Composer
- 1983 – "Famous Last Words" (on Manoeuvres album) by Greg Lake – Composer (with Andy Scott), Vocals (Background)
- 1983 – "Krugerrands" single by Andy Scott – composer, arranger
- 1984 – "Let her Dance" single by Andy Scott – Composer, Vocals
- 1984 – "Invisible" single by Andy Scott – composer, arranger
- 1985 – Face Another Day album by The Monroes – Vocals (Background)
- 1987 – Classic album by Dr. Feelgood – Vocals (Background)
- 1987 – "Hands to Heaven" single (UK no 4, US No 2) by Breathe – Vocals (Background)
- 1987 – "In The Heat Of The Night" b/w "Invisible" single by Press The Flesh – composer
- 1989 – "Wonderland" by Lene Lovich – Composer
- 1990 – March album by Lene Lovich – Composer
- 1990 – Me And My Mouth!?❊ album by Robert Lloyd – Vocals (Background)
- 1992 – "Natural" (song on album A) by Andy Scott's Sweet – composer, arranger
- 1995 – "A Touch of Class" (on Looking Back Box Set) by Dr. Feelgood – Composer, Vocals (Background)
