= Dancing in the City =

Single by Marshall Hain

from the album Free Ride
- B-side: "Take My Number"
- Released: May 1978
- Genre: Pop
- Length: 3:47
- Label: Harvest
- Songwriters: Julian Marshall; Kit Hain
- Producer: Christopher Neil

Marshall Hain singles chronology
"Dancing in the City" (1978)	"Coming Home" (1978)

Music video
- "Dancing in the City" (TopPop, 1978) on YouTube

"Dancing in the City" is a song by the British pop rock duo Marshall Hain, which reached No.3 in the UK charts in 1978. On its first release it spent fifteen weeks in the UK charts. In South Africa, reached the No.1 position on 3 November 1978, and holding that position for three weeks on the Springbok Charts. A remixed version released in 1987 reached No.81 on the UK charts.

== Charts ==
=== Weekly charts ===
Chart (1978–1979)	Peak position
Australia (Kent Music Report)	3
Austria (Ö3 Austria Top 40)	6
Belgium (Ultratop 50 Flanders)	7
Netherlands (Dutch Top 40)	7
Netherlands (Single Top 100)	14
New Zealand (Recorded Music NZ)	15
Sweden (Sverigetopplistan)	7
Switzerland (Schweizer Hitparade)	4
UK Singles (Official Charts)	3
US Billboard Hot 100	43
US Adult Contemporary (Billboard)	33
West Germany (GfK)	1

=== Year-end charts ===
Chart (1978)	Position
Australia (Kent Music Report)	26
Belgium (Ultratop Flanders)	60
Netherlands (Dutch Top 40)	61
Switzerland (Schweizer Hitparade)	29
West Germany (Official German Charts)	29

=== "Dancin' in the City '87" ===
Chart (1987)	Peak position
UK Singles (Official Charts)	81

=== "Dancin' in the City '92" ===
Chart (1992)	Peak position
UK Club Chart (Music Week)	24
