= The Heroes (band) =

English rock band

The Heroes were an English rock band formed in 1979, with Chris Bradford and Mark Hankins on guitar and vocals. The line-up was completed by Pete Lennon (lead guitar), Dave Powell (drums) and ex-Randy band-member Brian (Wally) Wallis on bass guitar.

Although primarily a recording group, they performed a tour of Germany with Dr. Feelgood, playing the Olympianhalle in Munich and the Top Ten Club in Hamburg. Playing good time rock and roll, the five piece recorded an album of ten Bradford penned songs: Border Raiders in 1980, plus a single "Some Kind of Women" b/w "10% Will Do" all released on the Polydor label.

== Personnel ==
- Chris Bradford - guitar, lead vocals
- Mark Hankins - guitar, vocals
- Pete Lennon - lead guitar
- Dave Powell - drums
- Brian (Wally) Wallis - bass guitar
- Pip Williams - producer

== Discography ==
- 1980 - Border Raiders (album)
- 1980 - "Some Kind of Women" / "10% Will Do" (single)
