= Manoeuvres =

Studio album by Greg Lake
- Released: July 1983
- Genre: Progressive rock
- Length: 44:33
- Label: Chrysalis
- Producer: Greg Lake

Greg Lake chronology
Greg Lake (1981)	Manoeuvres (1983)	King Biscuit Flower Hour Presents Greg Lake in Concert (1995)

Singles from Manoeuvres
- 1. "Famous Last Words" Released: 1983 (Portugal only)

Professional ratings
Review scores
Source	Rating
AllMusic	2/5 stars
Kerrang!	4/5 stars

Manoeuvres is the second and final solo studio album by English musician Greg Lake. It was released in July 1983 by Chrysalis Records and featured his 1981 to 1983 lineup (with guitarist Gary Moore, longtime friend bassist Tris Margetts, drummer Ted McKenna (The Sensational Alex Harvey Band; Rory Gallagher), and session keyboardist Tommy Eyre).

Like his debut solo album, Greg Lake (1981), Manoeuvres was created in close collaboration with Northern Irish guitarist and singer-songwriter Gary Moore. It includes a song "Haunted" written with friend and bassist Tris Margetts and rock cartoonist-artist Tony Benyon.

The album features a pop-flavoured progressive rock sound resembling that of Asia, the group Lake would join briefly in the end of 1983. Manoeuvres received mainly negative reviews at the time and failed to match the sales of its predecessor.

In his autobiography Lake says that "there was no tour and virtually no promotion", and that he recognised that the public did not want guitar-oriented music from him. He parted company with Chrysalis. The album would be Lake's last studio album as a solo artist.

== Later work by Greg Lake ==
His "Songs of a Lifetime" tour in 2012 produced a 2013 live album of the same name, and his 2012 solo concert live in Piacenza, Italy (where he was awarded an honorary doctorate by the University of Piacenza) also produced a live album "Live In Piacenza" released in 2017.

His other work consisted of collaborations and concerts with artists including Ringo Starr & His All-Starr Band; The Who; Ian Anderson; The RD Crusaders and Roger Daltrey (benefiting the Teenage Cancer Trust); his solo projects supporting the National Center for Missing & Exploited Children, the Sara Anne Wood Rescue Center, the Society for the Prevention of Cruelty to Animals, and other organizations, and periodic reunions with Emerson, Lake & Palmer.

== Track listing ==
All tracks are written by Greg Lake, except where noted.

Side one
No.	Title	Writer(s)	Length
1.	"Manoeuvres"	Greg Lake, Gary Moore	4:06
2.	"Too Young to Love"		4:07
3.	"Paralysed"		3:59
4.	"A Woman Like You"	Moore	4:32
5.	"I Don't Want to Lose Your Love Tonight"	Lake, Moore	3:56

Side two
No.	Title	Writer(s)	Length
6.	"It's You, You've Gotta Believe"		7:11
7.	"Famous Last Words"	Chris Bradford, Andy Scott, David Most	3:06
8.	"Slave to Love"		3:23
9.	"Haunted"	Lake, Tristram Tris Margetts, Tony Benyon	4:54
10.	"I Don't Know Why I Still Love You"		5:16
Total length:			44:33

2015 Cherry Red Records remastered edition bonus track
No.	Title	Length
11.	"Hold Me"	4:12

== Personnel ==
- Greg Lake – vocals, guitars, production
- Gary Moore – guitars
- Tristram "Tris" Margetts – bass
- Tommy Eyre – keyboards
- Ted McKenna – drums

Technicial personnel

- Dan Priest – mixing and overdub engineering (at Magritte Studios)
- Andy Pearce – 2010 remastering
- Robin Harris – illustrations
- John Pasche – design
