= Bardot (English band) =

UK musical group

Bardot (/bɑːrˈdoʊ/ bar-DOH) were a trio of singer/songwriters whose sound was sometimes compared to Crosby, Stills & Nash and The Eagles. The band released Rockin in Rhythm in 1978 on the RCA label, a collection of folk rock songs with complex harmonies. Three singles were also released, the debut "Witchfire" hitting the Dutch Tipparade (the 'bubbling under' for the Dutch Top 40).

Ray McRiner on guitar and vocals, was also known for his compositions, arrangement, vocal and instrumental work with Sweet, and as touring guitarist for the band.

Laurie Andrew on guitar and vocals, was also a successful solo recording artist in his own right with the single "I'll Never Love Anyone Anymore", a Top of the Pops appearance, along with composition and vocal credits for work with Sir Cliff Richard, Boney M, Traks, Gianco, Keith Forsey (session musician for Harold Faltermeyer and Giorgio Moroder among others), and Lesley Duncan.

== Personnel ==
- Ray McRiner – composer, guitar, vocals
- Laurie Andrew – composer, vocals
- Chris Bradford – composer, vocals
- Pip Williams – producer

== Discography ==
=== Albums ===
- Rockin in Rhythm (1978)
- No Bad Habits by Graham Bonnet (1978) – backing vocals

=== Singles ===
- "Witchfire" / "Hero's Reward" 7" (1977)
- "Julie" / "Mountain Side" 7" (Netherlands, 1978)
- "No-One Cries" / "All the Ladies" 7" (1978)
