= King Biscuit Flower Hour Presents Greg Lake in Concert =

King Biscuit Flower Hour Presents Greg Lake In Concert

Live album by the Greg Lake Band
- Released: July 1995
- Recorded: November 5, 1981
- Venue: Hammersmith Odeon, London, England
- Genre: Hard rock Progressive rock
- Length: 56:56
- Label: King Biscuit Entertainment
- Producer: Greg Lake

The Greg Lake Band chronology
Manoeuvres (1983)	King Biscuit Flower Hour Presents Greg Lake In Concert (1995)	The Greg Lake Retrospective: From The Beginning (1996)

Professional ratings
Review scores
Source	Rating
AllMusic	3/5 stars

King Biscuit Flower Hour Presents Greg Lake In Concert is a live album of the Greg Lake Band recorded in concert November 5, 1981, at the Hammersmith Odeon in London, England, that was broadcast live on the King Biscuit Flower Hour radio program, first released on CD in 1995.

The Greg Lake Band were Greg Lake (guitar, lead vocals) featuring Gary Moore (lead guitar, vocals), Tommy Eyre (keyboards, vocals), Tris Margetts (bass, vocals), and Ted McKenna (drums, vocals).

The set list included songs from the band's first album Greg Lake and Greg's King Crimson composition "21st Century Schizoid Man" as well as a mix of ELP's "Fanfare For The Common Man" and "Karn Evil 9"; Greg's ELP song "Lucky Man", and Gary Moore's "Parisienne Walkways".

The recording has been released multiple times with various titles (including London '81), sometimes featuring songs recorded at other concerts during the band's 1981 tour of the UK, U.S. and Canada, and some releases include Greg's King Crimson song "In The Court Of The Crimson King" and other selections such as Greg's Emerson, Lake & Palmer song "C'est la Vie".

The recording was mastered at PolyGram Studios. The CD was mastered at Dolphin Studios.

== Track listing ==
No.	Title	Writer(s)	Length
1.	"Fanfare for the Common Man – Karn Evil 9"	Aaron Copland – Keith Emerson, Greg Lake, Peter Sinfield	6:11
2.	"Nuclear Attack"	Gary Moore	5:45
3.	"The Lie"	Tony Benyon, Tommy Eyre, Greg Lake	4:33
4.	"Retribution Drive"	Tony Benyon, Tommy Eyre, Greg Lake	5:41
5.	"Lucky Man"	Greg Lake	4:50
6.	"Parisienne Walkways"	Phil Lynott, Gary Moore	6:03
7.	"You've Really Got a Hold on Me"	Smokey Robinson	5:25
8.	"Love You Too Much"	Bob Dylan, Greg Lake, Helena Springs	5:03
9.	"21st Century Schizoid Man"	Robert Fripp, Ian McDonald, Greg Lake, Michael Giles, Peter Sinfield	9:06
10.	"The Court of the Crimson King"	Ian McDonald, Peter Sinfield	5:39

== Personnel ==
Greg Lake Band

- Greg Lake – lead vocals, guitar
- Gary Moore – lead guitar, vocals
- Tristram Margetts – bass
- Tommy Eyre – keyboards, vocals
- Ted McKenna – drums, percussion
