= Spirits Walking Out =

- US Mercury Records release cover

Studio album by Kit Hain
- Released: 1981
- Studio: Munich (Germany)
- Genres: Pop rock; synth-pop
- Label: Deram
- Producer: Mike Thorne

Kit Hain chronology
Spirits Walking Out (1981)	School for Spies (1983)

Singles from Spirits Walking Out
- 1. "Looking for You" Released: 1981; 2. "Uninvited Guests" Released: 1981; 3. "Danny" Released: 1981

Professional ratings
Review scores
Source	Rating
AllMusic	4/5 stars

Spirits Walking Out is the debut solo studio album by the English pop singer Kit Hain, released in 1981 by Deram Records. The track "Danny" became a minor success in the charts. The tracks "Looking for You" and "Parting Would be Painless" were both covered by Roger Daltrey of the Who and released on his fifth solo studio album Parting Should Be Painless (1984).

The LP was released in the US by Mercury Records under the title Looking for You, with a slightly different track listing.

== Track listing ==
All tracks written by Kit Hain.

Side 1

1. "Force Grown" – 3:35
2. "I'm the One Who's with You" – 3:37
3. "Uninvited Guests" – 3:22
4. "Aaron" – 4:09
5. "Awaking Again" – 4:18

Side 2

1. "Looking for You" – 2:58
2. "Danny" – 3:45
3. "Spirits Walking Out" – 3:55
4. "Parting Would Be Painless" – 3:27
5. "You Are the One" – 3:27

The US edition replaces the songs "You Are the One" and "Force Grown" for "Inner Ring" and "Survivors."

== Personnel ==
- Kit Hain – lead vocals, piano, synthesizer, guitar
- Brian Holloway – bass guitar
- Bob Jenkins – drums
- Martin Ditcham – percussion
- Mike Thorne – synthesizer
