= New Toy =

EP by Lene Lovich
- Released: 1981
- Recorded: 1980–81
- Genre: New wave
- Length: 21:17
- Label: Stiff
- Producer: Lene Lovich; Les Chappell

Lene Lovich chronology
Flex (1979)	New Toy (1981)	No Man's Land (1982)

Singles from New Toy
- 1. "New Toy" Released: February 1981

New Toy is the first extended play by English-American singer-songwriter Lene Lovich released in 1981 by Stiff Records. It was released outside the United Kingdom in three different versions, one featured six new songs, while the other two contained songs from her previous albums, Stateless (1978) and Flex (1979).

The main single "New Toy", in which she makes fun of the consumer society, was released in February 1981 and became successful in charts, peaking at number 19 on the Billboard Hot Dance Club Songs number 53 on the UK Singles Chart, and number 29 on the Australian Kent Music Report. It was written by Thomas Dolby, about his new Fairlight CMI synthesizer. He created the song specifically for Lovich after seeing her perform live. It was also used in Italy as the first ending theme for the anime series Attack No. 1 in 1981.

The songs "Special Star" and "Savages" later appeared on her third studio album, No Man's Land (1982) and all the songs from the EP appeared on the CD re-issue of the album.

== Reception ==
Professional ratings
Review scores
Source	Rating
AllMusic	3/5 stars

Barry Lederer reviewed the 12-inch single of "New Toy" for Billboard magazine, comparing Lovich's vocals to Debbie Harry on Blondie's "Rapture". He noted the "fully-orchestrated introduction" which he felt was "more disco than rock in flavor" and highlighted the "catchy tempo" maintained by piano and keyboard, resulting in a "pop feel". The B-side "Cats Away" was described as a "gutsy, riveting electronic instrumental".

== Track listing ==
=== Extended Play ===
5E 37452 (US and Canada 12") / 5ET 37425 (US and Canada Cassette) AL 37452 (Australia 12") / C 20011 (Australia Cassette)
No.	Title	Writer(s)	Length
1.	"New Toy"	Thomas Dolby	3:18
2.	"Savages"	Lene Lovich; Les Chappell	3:50
3.	"Special Star"	Lovich; Chappell	3:11
4.	"Never Never Land"	Jimme O'Neill	4:05
5.	"Cats Away"	Lovich; Chappell	3:41
6.	"Details"	Lovich; Chappell	3:12
Total length:			21:17

VIP-5908 (Japan 12")
No.	Title	Writer(s)	Length
1.	"New Toy"	Dolby	3:18
2.	"Lucky Number" (Disco Version)	Lovich; Chappell	4:32
3.	"Bird Song" (Edit)	Lovich; Chappell	4:01
4.	"Details"	Lovich; Chappell	3:12
5.	"Joan"	Lovich; Chappell	3:19
6.	"Cats Away"	Lovich; Chappell	3:41
Total length:			22:03

=== Single ===
United Kingdom 7-inch single – BUY 97 / Australia 7-inch single – K-8195

1. "New Toy" – 3:18
2. "Cats Away" (Single version) – 3:41

United Kingdom 12-inch single – BUYIT 97

1. "New Toy" (Extended version) – 4:38
2. "Cats Away" (Single version) – 3:41

Australia 12-inch single – X 13067

1. "New Toy" (Extended version) – 4:38
2. "Cats Away" (Single version) – 3:41
3. "Monkey Talk" (Live) – 3:15
4. "The Night" (Live) – 4:14
5. "Too Tender (To Touch)" (Live) – 4:13
6. "You Can't Kill Me" (Live) – 3:40

== Charts ==
Chart (1981)	Peak position
Australia (Kent Music Report)	29
Italian Singles (Musica e dischi)	15
UK (Official Charts Company)	53
US (Billboard Hot Dance Club Songs)	19

== Credits and personnel ==
- Lene Lovich - vocals, songwriter, producer
- Les Chappell - songwriter, producer
- Mike "The Woj" Wojnicki - Inspiration
