= Shadows and Dust =

Studio album by Lene Lovich
- Released: 13 September 2005
- Genre: New wave
- Label: The Stereo Society
- Producers: Mike Thorne, Lene Lovich, Les Chappell

Lene Lovich chronology
March (1989)	Shadows and Dust (2005)

Shadows and Dust is the fifth studio album by English-American new wave singer Lene Lovich. Released in 2005, it was her first album in 16 years, the preceding album being 1989's March. Like the previous album, this one was also recorded in Norfolk. The album was produced by Mike Thorne and released on his own label, The Stereo Society.

The record company made a mistake with the track listing: they intended to change the sequence of the tracks and updated the art work to reflect the new song order, but neglected to change the running order on the disc itself.

== Reception ==
Writing for AllMusic, critic Dave Thompson said the Shadows and Dust was "the album that Lovich should have made in 1980", stating that it would have been a much better follow-up to 1979's Flex than the albums that actually followed. Time Out New York said that the album "reveals Lovich to be as gleefully off-kilter as ever. The album is a brilliantly giddy crush of goofy goth and rubbery funk. Alt.Culture.Guide said that the album was "armed with sequencers, a deepened sense of theater and one or two block-rockin beats". The Harp review found the first few tracks "ponderous" but liked the later tracks, saying that the track "Insect Eater" "really scorches the rocket cottage with Lovich's repeated shrieks of "Earwigs in my bed at midnight!" underlined with luscious keyboard burbles". The reviewer for the Charleston Gazette said the album is "shocking in that Lovich seems not to have missed a beat. She sounds just as wonderfully strange as ever." The Venus Zine review said "Lovich has created an album with an updated sound and a darker edge", describing the music as "somewhat goth, vaguely Siouxsie-like".

== Track listing ==
All tracks composed by Lene Lovich and Les Chappell except where indicated

1. "Craze" (Lene Lovich, Les Chappell, Julian Standen, Heathcote Williams)
2. "Shape Shifter"
3. "Sanctuary"
4. "Remember"
5. "Gothica"
6. "Ghost Story"
7. "The Insect Eater"
8. "Little Rivers"
9. "The Wicked Witch" (Lene Lovich, Les Chappell, Achim Mennicken, Michael Bulgrin)
10. "Light"

== Personnel ==
- Lene Lovich - saxophone, vocals
- Les Chappell - multi-instruments
- Mike Thorne - bass, synthesizer
