= School for Spies =

Studio album by Kit Hain
- Released: 1983
- Studios: Mediasound, New York City
- Genre: Pop rock
- Label: Mercury
- Producer: Mike Thorne

Kit Hain chronology
Spirits Walking Out (1981)	School for Spies (1983)	Cry Freedom (1995)

Professional ratings
Review scores
Source	Rating
AllMusic	4/5 stars

School for Spies is the second studio album by the English pop singer Kit Hain. The track titled "Fallen Angel" was covered by Roger Daltrey and released on his 1985 solo album Under a Raging Moon.

== Track listings ==
All tracks written by Kit Hain

1. "Pulling Apart"
2. "School for Spies" (Kit Hain, Chris Bradford)
3. "Perfect Timing"
4. "I Need to Be with You"
5. "Bells of Old Paris" (Kit Hain, Chris Bradford)
6. "Fallen Angel"
7. "Cry Wolf"
8. "After the Darkness"
9. "Too Far Too Soon"
10. "Wild Ones Dance"

== Personnel ==
- Kit Hain – lead vocals, keyboards
- Chris Spedding – guitars
- Anthony Jackson – bass guitar
- Allan Schwartzberg – drums
- Mike Thorne – keyboards
- Julian Marshall – harpsichord
- John Gatchell – trumpet
- Dave Tofani – saxophone
- Lou Toby – accordion
- Diana Halprin – violin
- Robert Medici – marimba
