= Kit Hain =

English musician, songwriter and writer

- Born: Keturah Verity Hain; 15 December 1952 (age 73); Cobham, Surrey, England
- Genres: Pop rock; synth-pop
- Occupations: Singer; songwriter; musician; writer
- Instruments: Vocals; bass guitar; guitar; keyboards
- Years active: 1970s–present
- Labels: Harvest; Deram; Mercury
- Formerly of: Marshall Hain
- Website: kittusmusic.com

Keturah Verity Hain (born 15 December 1952) is an English singer, songwriter, musician and writer. She was a member of the short-lived pop rock duo Marshall Hain and had a solo career as a performer and songwriter.

== Early life and education ==
Hain was born in Cobham, Surrey on 15 December 1952. She graduated with an upper second-class degree in Psychology from Durham University in 1975.

== Musical career ==
Hain met Julian Marshall while they were pupils at Dartington Hall School, and together they formed the pop rock duo Marshall Hain when Hain finished university and relocated to London. Marshall played keyboards, while Hain performed lead vocals and bass guitar. Their 1978 single "Dancing in the City" reached No. 3 on the UK singles chart. However, the band broke up when Julian Marshall found the pressure too much.

Hain's first release after the duo break-up was "The Joke's on You", for Harvest Records. She then signed to Deram Records and subsequently Mercury Records for several singles and studio albums. Hain moved to the United States in 1985 and forged a successful career as a songwriter. Her portfolio includes "Fires of Eden" (Judy Collins, Cher), "Back to Avalon" (Heart), "Rip in Heaven" and "Crash and Burn" ('Til Tuesday), "Further from Fantasy" (Annie Haslam), "Remind My Heart" and "Every Time We Fall" (Lea Salonga).

Her songs have also been recorded by Roger Daltrey, Kiki Dee, Barbara Dickson, Fleetwood Mac, Kim Criswell, Conchita Wurst, Milow and Stan Van Samang.

== Writer ==
Under her married name Kit Grindstaff she writes novels for teens and pre-teens. Her debut, The Flame in the Mist (2013) is a dark fantasy, published by Delacorte Press and Random House Children's Books.

== Discography ==
- Spirits Walking Out (US title: Looking for You) (1981)
- School for Spies (1983)
- Cry Freedom (1995)
