= Les Chappell =

English footballer and manager

Personal information
- Date of birth: 6 February 1947 (age 79)
- Place of birth: Nottingham, England
- Position: Striker

Senior career*
Years	Team	Apps	(Gls)
1965–1968	Rotherham United	108	(37)
1968–1969	Blackburn Rovers	7	(0)
1969–1974	Reading	201	(78)
1974–1976	Doncaster Rovers	58	(10)
1976–1978	Swansea City	67	(5)

Managerial career
- 1984: Swansea City (caretaker)
- 1984: Swansea City (caretaker)
- * Club domestic league appearances and goals

Les Chappell (born 6 February 1947) is an English footballer who played as a striker.

Chappell began his career with Rotherham United in 1965 and was a part of the team for over three seasons, scoring regularly. Following the Millers' relegation, he joined Blackburn Rovers, before moving onto Reading in 1969.

He became a key player for Reading over the next five years before moving to Doncaster Rovers. Chappell finished his league football career with Swansea City, joining the coaching staff. He was caretaker manager from March to May 1984, following the dismissal of John Toshack, and again in December 1984, following the dismissal of Colin Appleton.
