= No Man's Land (Lene Lovich album) =

Studio album by Lene Lovich
- Released: 12 November 1982
- Recorded: 1980–82
- Studio: Konk Studios, London; Wessex Sound, London; Good Earth Studios, London; Sound Suite, Camden; Basing Street Studios, London; Genetic Studios, West Berkshire; AIR, London
- Genre: New wave
- Length: 34:28
- Label: Stiff
- Producer: Lene Lovich; Les Chappell

Lene Lovich chronology
Flex (1979)	No Man's Land (1982)	March (1989)

Singles from No Man's Land
- 1. "It's You, Only You (Mein Schmerz)" Released: October 1982; 2. "Blue Hotel" Released: March 1983

Professional ratings
Review scores
Source	Rating
AllMusic	2/5 stars

No Man's Land is the third studio album by Lene Lovich, released on 12 November 1982 by Stiff Records. It is her last album to be released on the Stiff Records label. The album is produced by Lovich and Les Chappell. It contains songs from her previously released extended play, New Toy. The album had been planned to be released in 1981, but was postponed following disagreements with the record company.

The lead single, "It's You, Only You (Mein Schmerz)", reached number 25 on the Billboard Hot Dance Club Songs and number 51 on the Mainstream Rock chart. It peaked at number 68 on the UK Singles Chart. "Blue Hotel" was released as the second single.

After its release, No Man's Land received mixed reviews from critics and was less commercially successful compared to her previous albums, Stateless (1978) and Flex (1979). It peaked at number 188 on the Billboard 200.

== Track listing ==
No Man's Land
No.	Title	Writer(s)	Length
1.	"It's You, Only You (Mein Schmerz)"	Ferdinand Bakker; Hugo Sinzheimer	3:42
2.	"Blue Hotel"	Lene Lovich; Les Chappell; Mauro Goldsand	3:43
3.	"Faces"	Lovich; Chappell	3:32
4.	"Walking Low"	Lovich; Chappell	3:16
5.	"Special Star"	Lovich; Chappell	4:31
6.	"Sister Video"	Jimme O'Neill	4:45
7.	"Maria"	Lovich; Chappell	3:02
8.	"Savages"	Lovich; Chappell	3:47
9.	"Rocky Road"	Lovich; Chappell	6:37
Total length:			36:55

North American cassette bonus track – AET 38399 / FET 38399
No.	Title	Writer(s)	Length
10.	"It's You, Only You (Mein Schmertz)" (Dub)	Bakker; Sinzheimer	5:45
Total length:			42:40

Line Records CD reissue (1991) – LICD 9.01074 O
No.	Title	Writer(s)	Notes	Length
9.	"Rocky Road" (Edit (Note: CD pressings of No Man's Land by Line Records and Stiff Records include an edited version of "Rocky Road". The full-length "Rocky Road" was released on the compilations The Stiff Years: Volume 2 (1990) and Toy Box: The Stiff Years 1978-1983 (2023).))	Lovich; Chappell		4:17
10.	"New Toy"	Thomas Dolby	From New Toy EP	3:19
11.	"Cats Away"	Lovich; Chappell	From New Toy EP	3:44
12.	"Details"	Lovich; Chappell	From New Toy EP	3:12
13.	"Blue Hotel" (Version)	Lovich; Chappell; Goldstand	A-side of "Blue Hotel" (Italian and German 7" releases)	3:08
14.	"Never Never Land"	Jimme O'Neill	From New Toy EP	4:07
Total length:				52:05

Stiff Records CD reissue (1993) – STIFFCD 22
No.	Title	Writer(s)	Notes	Length
9.	"Rocky Road" (Edit)	Lovich; Chappell		4:17
10.	"New Toy"	Thomas Dolby	From New Toy EP	3:19
11.	"Cats Away"	Lovich; Chappell	From New Toy EP	3:44
12.	"Details"	Lovich; Chappell	From New Toy EP	3:12
13.	"Blue Hotel" (Version)	Lovich; Chappell; Goldstand	A-side of "Blue Hotel" (Italian and German 7" releases)	3:08
14.	"Special Star" (Version)	Lovich; Chappell	From New Toy EP	3:11
15.	"Never Never Land"	Jimme O'Neill	From New Toy EP	4:07
Total length:				55:16

== Personnel ==
- Lene Lovich – vocals, saxophone, trumpet
- Les Chappell – guitar, synthesizer, vocals
- Jeff Smith – synthesizer
- Mark Heyward-Chaplin – bass
- Bogdan Wiczling – drums
- Justin Hildreth – drums
- Dean Klevatt – piano
- Nick Plytas – keyboards
- Thomas Dolby – synthesizer on "Rocky Road"
- Jimme O'Neill – rhythm synthesizer, vocals on "Sister Video"
- Alvin Clark, Bryan Evans, Damian Korner, Gordon Fordyce, Jon Walls, Martin Rushent, Peter Rackham, Steve Nye
- Recording engineer – Jon Walls
- Produced by Lene Lovich, Les Chappell
- Remixed by Bob Clearmountain with Lene Lovich, Les Chappell and Dick Wingate
