= Greg Lake (album) =

Studio album by Greg Lake
- Released: 25 September 1981
- Genre: Hard rock; progressive rock
- Length: 43:13
- Label: Chrysalis
- Producer: Greg Lake; Alex Grobb

Greg Lake chronology
In Concert (EL&P) (1979)	Greg Lake (1981)	Manoeuvres (1983)

Singles from Greg Lake
- 1. "Love You Too Much" Released: 2 October 1981 (UK); 2. "Let Me Love You Once" Released: November 1981 (US); 3. "Nuclear Attack" Released: 21 January 1982 (Japan); 4. "It Hurts" Released: 12 February 1982 (UK)

Greg Lake is the debut studio album by English rock singer and guitarist Greg Lake, released in the United Kingdom on 25 September 1981 by Chrysalis Records.

== Background ==
In contrast to the progressive rock of King Crimson and Emerson, Lake & Palmer, the groups which Lake had been member of, this album is characterized by a guitar-driven straightforward hard rock sound. The change in musical style is explained by his desire to perform as a guitarist rather than playing bass.

To record the album, Lake teamed up with a string of prominent musicians, including Gary Moore, Clarence Clemons, and Toto members Steve Lukather, David Hungate and Jeff Porcaro. Moore played a major role, and the album opened with a version of his song "Nuclear Attack". In 1993, when the album was finally released on CD (in Japan), it was re-titled Greg Lake & Gary Moore.

== Reception ==
Professional ratings
Review scores
Source	Rating
AllMusic	3/5 stars

Marc Loren's retrospective review on AllMusic described Greg Lake as a "powerful and enjoyable album" which contains "well written songs and some sizzling guitar work by Gary Moore", and praised Lake's production skills. Paul Stump, in his 1997 History of Progressive Rock, called the album "characterless" and straightforward to the point of being dull.

Greg Lake charted in the United Kingdom and the United States, reaching the same number 62 spot in both countries. Several songs were released as singles in different territories. "Let Me Love You Once Before You Go", a cover of the 1977 song written by Steve Dorff and Molly Ann Leikin for Dusty Springfield, was issued in the United States and peaked at number 48 on the Billboard Hot 100. "Nuclear Attack" was a minor radio hit and reached number 34 on the Mainstream Rock chart.

== Track listing ==
Side one
No.	Title	Writer(s)	Length
1.	"Nuclear Attack"	Gary Moore	4:32
2.	"Love You Too Much"	Bob Dylan, Helena Springs, Greg Lake	3:56
3.	"It Hurts"	Lake	4:30
4.	"Black and Blue"	Lake	3:59
5.	"Retribution Drive"	Lake, Tony Benyon, Tommy Eyre	5:05

Side two
No.	Title	Writer(s)	Length
6.	"Long Goodbye"	Eyre, Lake, Benyon	4:00
7.	"The Lie"	Lake, Eyre, Benyon	4:47
8.	"Someone"	Eyre, Lake, Benyon	4:12
9.	"Let Me Love You Once Before You Go"	Steve Dorff, Molly Ann Leikin	4:21
10.	"For Those Who Dare"	Lake, Benyon	3:51
Total length:			43:13

== Personnel ==
- Greg Lake – vocals, production (tracks 1, 2, and 4–10)
- Gary Moore – guitars
- Tristram Margetts – bass
- Tommy Eyre – keyboards
- Ted McKenna – drums

Additional personnel

- Steve Lukather – guitars
- Dean Parks – guitars
- Snuffy Walden – guitars
- David Hungate – bass
- Bill Cuomo – keyboards
- Greg Mathieson – keyboards
- Clarence Clemons – saxophone
- Willie Cochrane – pipes
- David Milner – pipes
- Michael Giles – drums
- Jode Leigh – drums
- Jeff Porcaro – drums

Production

- Alex Grobb – production (track 3)
- Haydn Bendall, Harold Blumberg, Paul Dobbe, Brian Robson, Ian Short, John Timperley, Nigel Walker – engineering
- Tony Benyon – cover concept
- John Pasche – art direction
- Rocky Morton – design

== Charts ==
Chart (1981)	Peak position
Australian Albums (Kent Music Report)	97
UK Albums (OCC)	62
US Billboard 200	62
