= March (Lene Lovich album) =

Studio album by Lene Lovich
- Released: October 1989
- Recorded: 1986–89
- Studio: H.O.M.E. Studios, Norfolk, England; RPM Studios, New York
- Genre: Synth-pop; new wave; dance-rock
- Length: 45:35
- Label: Pathfinder / RCA
- Producer: Les Chappell; Lene Lovich

Lene Lovich chronology
No Man's Land (1982)	March (1989)	Shadows and Dust (2005)

Singles from March
- 1. "Wonderland" Released: 1988; 2. "Make Believe" Released: April 1990

Professional ratings
Review scores
Source	Rating
AllMusic	2/5 stars

March is the fourth studio album by English-American singer-songwriter Lene Lovich, released in October 1989 by Pathfinder Records. It was Lovich's first full-length album of original material since No Man's Land (1982) and also the last before her 15-year hiatus and the release of Shadows and Dust (2005). The album is produced by Lovich and Les Chappell who also wrote all the songs, except for "Wonderland" (co-written by Andy Scott and Chris Bradford.) It was recorded in Norfolk, England.

The lead single "Wonderland" was released in 1988 and reached number 25 on the Billboard Hot Dance Club Songs. "Make Believe" was released in April 1990 as a promotional single accompanied by a music video.

March received mixed reviews from the music critics.

== Track listings ==
March (1989 vinyl)
No.	Title	Writer(s)	Length
1.	"Life"	Lene Lovich; Les Chappell	4:42
2.	"Wonderland"	Andy Scott; Chris Bradford; Lovich; Chappell	3:50
3.	"Hold On to Love"	Lovich; Chappell	5:23
4.	"Rage"	Lovich; Chappell	5:58
5.	"Natural Beauty"	Lovich; Chappell	5:00
6.	"Make Believe"	Lovich; Chappell	5:01
7.	"Nightshift"	Lovich; Chappell	3:55
8.	"Sharman"	Lovich; Chappell	4:28
Total length:			38:17

March (1989 CD)
No.	Title	Writer(s)	Length
1.	"Life"	Lovich; Chappell	4:42
2.	"Wonderland"	Scott; Bradford; Lovich; Chappell	3:50
3.	"Nightshift"	Lovich; Chappell	3:55
4.	"Hold On to Love"	Lovich; Chappell	5:23
5.	"Rage"	Lovich; Chappell	5:58
6.	"Natural Beauty"	Lovich; Chappell	5:00
7.	"Make Believe"	Lovich; Chappell	5:01
8.	"Shadow Walk"	Lovich; Chappell	3:03
9.	"Vertigo"	Lovich; Chappell	4:15
10.	"Sharman"	Lovich; Chappell	4:28
Total length:			45:35

March (1995 CD bonus track)
No.	Title	Writer(s)	Length
11.	"Wonderland" (New York Dance Mix)	Scott; Bradford; Lovich; Chappell	8:12
Total length:			53:47

== Personnel ==
Personnel

- Lene Lovich – vocals, saxophone, trumpet, violin
- Les Chappell – multi-instruments, vocals
- Mark Heyward-Chaplin – bass on "Nightshift", "Vertigo" and "Sharman"
- Gavin Harrison – percussion on "Vertigo"

Design

- Patrick Roques – art direction
- Josef Astor – photography

Production

- Douglas Lichterman – executive producer
- Tom Milmore – executive producer
- Mark Reynolds – assistant engineer
- Mark Gilbert – assistant engineer

Credits adapted from the album's liner notes.
