= Flex (album) =

Studio album by Lene Lovich
- Released: 18 January 1980
- Recorded: 1979
- Studios: Wisseloord Studios, Hilversum, Netherlands
- Genre: New wave
- Length: 37:38
- Label: Stiff
- Producers: Lene Lovich; Les Chappell; Roger Bechirian; Alan Winstanley

Lene Lovich chronology
Stateless (1978)	Flex (1980)	No Man's Land (1982)

Singles from Flex
- 1. "Bird Song" Released: 28 September 1979; 2. "Angels" Released: January 1980; 3. "What Will I Do Without You?" Released: March 1980; 4. "The Night" Released: April 1980

Professional ratings
Review scores
Source	Rating
AllMusic	3/5 stars
Record Mirror	3/5 stars
Smash Hits	6/10

Flex is the second studio album by English-American singer-songwriter Lene Lovich, released in January 1980 by Stiff Records. The album is produced by Lovich and Les Chappell with additional production by Roger Bechirian and Alan Winstanley. It was recorded at the Wisseloord Studios in Hilversum, Netherlands. She worked with Chappell and Judge Smith on writing the songs.

The sleeve depicts Lovich wearing a wedding dress and playing with hockey pucks on a string. It was taken inside a stainless steel fermentation tank at a Guinness brewery, after it had been emptied prior to cleaning. It caused controversy and few members of the Baptist church tried to get the album banned in the United States, saying it depicted an act of witchcraft.

Lovich described Flex as her more introverted album. After its release, it received relatively positive reviews praising album's enhanced production compared to her previous album Stateless' rough sound. It was also more successful in charts, peaking at number 94 on the Billboard 200 and number 19 on the UK Albums Chart. The lead single "Bird Song" peaked at number 39 on the UK Singles Chart. The following singles were "Angels" and "What Will I Do Without You?", of which the latter peaked at number 58.

The release of the album was followed by Lovich's first sold-out tour in the United States and a three-month tour within Europe, the highlight of which was a sold-out show in front of 10,000 fans in Belgrade.

== Background and recording ==
After the release of her successful debut album Stateless in 1978, Lovich embarked on the Be Stiff '78 tour along with four other artists from the recording label. In the middle of 1979, she had two top 20 hits, "Lucky Number" and "Say When", and was voted "Top Female Recording Artist of the Year" by Music Week. She went on to record her second more improved album and enhance the quality of productions by using modern technology and instruments to achieve a better sound than her previous record. She again collaborated with Les Chappell and also brought Judge Smith, who wrote two songs on the album. Flex was recorded at the Wisseloord Studios in Hilversum, Netherlands.

== Composition ==
"I'm quite happy for people to read in many different stories to my music. It always interests me when people come up and say, 'I know what that song is about' and they tell me a new story that I haven't ever heard of before. I feel very strongly in people exercising their own imaginations."

— Lene Lovich, about the meanings of her songs

Described as Lovich's more introverted album, Flex deals with subjects that include more of emotional and mental activity, and are often inspired by dream images. The opening track "Bird Song" was written by Lovich and Les Chappell. When Lovich woke up in the night from a dream, she recorded different sounds on a tape recorder. The recording later served as an inspiration for the song, where at the beginning she mimics the sounds of birds. "What Will I Do Without You?" is a song written especially for the album by Judge Smith. Another song written by him appears on the album, "You Can't Kill Me", which he had already written in 1972. It deals with reincarnation. "Angels" is a song dedicated to people who like to live dangerously. Lovich spoke on people who do dangerous jobs and that they serve as an inspiration to other people. She also said, working in the music industry can be sometimes mentally damaging, but is also a good recreation. "The Night" is a cover of The Four Seasons' song. Lovich picked up the record in a second hand shop out of curiosity, since she had been interested in the band's music and later decided to record it for the album.

In "Egghead", Lovich sings about people constantly learning a lot of facts, but not understanding life and practical things. In "Wonderful One", she expresses her feelings about music and how blessed she feels being able to create it. "Monkey Talk" was allegedly inspired by two books, one by Charles Darwin and Planet of the Apes by Pierre Boulle. It points out the transience of success. Using the image of Joan of Arc, "Joan" speaks about the necessity of self-confidence to trust your own ideas.

== Commercial performance ==
Flex debuted on the Billboard 200 chart at number 140 in the week dated March 8, 1980. It peaked at number 94 in its sixth week on the chart.

== Track listings ==
Flex (1980)
No.	Title	Writer(s)	Length
1.	"Bird Song"	Lene Lovich; Les Chappell	4:27
2.	"What Will I Do Without You?"	Judge Smith	3:35
3.	"Angels"	Lovich; Chappell	3:08
4.	"The Night"	Bob Gaudio; Al Ruzicka	4:31
5.	"You Can't Kill Me"	Smith	3:45
6.	"Egghead"	Lovich; Chappell	2:26
7.	"Wonderful One"	Lovich; Chappell	4:28
8.	"Monkey Talk"	Lovich; Chappell	3:20
9.	"Joan"	Lovich; Chappell	3:18
10.	"The Freeze"	Lovich; Chappell	4:40
Total length:			37:38

U.S. Rhino Records CD reissue bonus tracks (Flex...Plus) (1991) – R2 70521
No.	Title	Writer(s)	Notes	Length
11.	"New Toy"	Thomas Dolby	From New Toy EP	3:19
12.	"Savages"	Lovich; Chappell	From New Toy EP	3:52
13.	"Special Star"	Lovich; Chappell	From New Toy EP	3:11
14.	"Never Never Land"	Jimme O'Neill	From New Toy EP	4:07
15.	"Cats Away"	Lovich; Chappell	From New Toy EP	3:44
16.	"Details"	Lovich; Chappell	From New Toy EP	3:12
17.	"It's You, Only You (Mein Schmerz)"	Eric De Zwaan; Ferdinand Bakker; Hugo Sinzheimer; Jan Voster; Job Tarenskeen; Åke Danielson	From No Man's Land album	3:39
18.	"Blue Hotel"	Lovich; Chappell; Mauro Goldsand	From No Man's Land album	3:46
Total length:				66:28

U.S. Rhino Records cassette reissue bonus tracks (Flex...Plus) (1991) – R4 70521
No.	Title	Writer(s)	Notes	Length
11.	"New Toy"	Dolby	From New Toy EP	3:19
12.	"Never Never Land"	O'Neill	From New Toy EP	4:07
Total length:				45:04

EU Line Records CD reissue bonus tracks (1991) – LICD 9.01071 O
No.	Title	Writer(s)	Notes	Length
11.	"The Fly"	Lovich; Chappell	B-side of "Angels" (7" & 12")	2:58
12.	"One Lonely Heart"	Lovich; Chappell	B-side of "Say When" (12")	3:21
13.	"O Seasons, O Castles"	Lovich; Chappell	B-side of "Maria" (Australian 7") & "Blue Hotel" (German 7")	2:49
14.	"Blue"	Lovich; Chappell	B-side of "It's You, Only You (Mein Schmertz)" (7" & 12")	2:57
Total length:				49:43

EU Stiff Records CD reissue bonus tracks (1993) – STIFFCD 21
No.	Title	Writer(s)	Notes	Length
11.	"The Fly"	Lovich; Chappell	B-side of "Angels" (7" & 12")	2:58
12.	"One Lonely Heart"	Lovich; Chappell	B-side of "Say When" (7" & 12")	3:19
13.	"O Seasons, O Castles"	Lovich; Chappell	B-side of "Maria" (Australian 7") & "Blue Hotel" (German 7")	2:49
14.	"Blue"	Lovich; Chappell	B-side of "It's You, Only You (Mein Schmertz)" (7" & 12")	2:57
15.	"Trixi"	Lovich; Chappell	B-side of "Bird Song" (7" & 12")	2:30
Total length:				52:13

Japan Poplot CD reissue bonus tracks (2001) – MTCY 1003
No.	Title	Writer(s)	Notes	Length
11.	"New Toy"	Dolby	From New Toy EP	3:19
12.	"The Fall"	Smith	B-side of "Angels" (12")	3:38
13.	"Details"	Lovich; Chappell	From New Toy EP	3:12
14.	"The Fly"	Lovich; Chappell	B-side of "Angels" (7" & 12")	2:58
15.	"Trixi"	Lovich; Chappell	B-side of "Bird Song" (7" & 12")	2:30
Total length:				53:15

== Charts ==
Chart (1980)	Peak position
Australia (Kent Music Report)	81
Canada (CRIA)	17
Canada (RPM)	51
Germany (GfK Entertainment Charts)	39
Portugal (Musica & Som)	2
Sweden (Sverigetopplistan)	38
UK (Official Charts Company)	19
US Billboard 200	94

== Credits and personnel ==
Personnel

- Lene Lovich – vocals, saxophone, backing vocals
- Les Chappell – guitar, synthesizer, backing vocals
- Justin Hildreth – drums, backing vocals
- Mark Heyward-Chaplin – bass, backing vocals
- Dean Klevatt – keyboards, backing vocals
- Nick Plytas – keyboards
- Chris Judge Smith – additional vocals

Design

- C-More-Tone Studios – design
- Brian Griffin – photography

Production

- Roger Bechirian – producer, backing vocals
- Alan Winstanley – producer
- Peter Bord – engineer

Credits adapted from the album's liner notes.
