= Stateless (Lene Lovich album) =

Studio album by Lene Lovich
- Released: October 1978
- Recorded: 1978
- Studio: Pathway, London; Wessex, London
- Genre: New wave
- Length: 35:31
- Label: Stiff / Epic (US)
- Producer: The Stateless (Lene Lovich, Les Chappell)

Lene Lovich chronology
Stateless (1978)	Flex (1980)

Singles from Stateless
- 1. "I Think We're Alone Now" Released: July 1978; 2. "Lucky Number" Released: January 26, 1979; 3. "Say When" Released: May 11, 1979

Stateless is the debut studio album by English-American singer Lene Lovich. It was released in October 1978 by Stiff Records and produced by Lene Lovich and Les Chappell (credited as "The Stateless").

== Release ==
The UK version of the album was released in 1978 and in the United States in 1979.

The album was available in two different releases. The more common release had most of the songs remixed from the original versions and included the single version of "Lucky Number". On this version, the tracks were slightly shortened. While the original vocals were often straightforward, this release featured new vocals accentuating Lovich's quirky singing style.

The album cover varied between countries.

== Chart Performance ==
Stateless peaked at number 35 on the UK Albums Chart, while also managing to chart in Australia, the Netherlands and New Zealand.

The album reached the Top 20 of the Australian albums chart in the week dated May 29, 1979. It peaked at number 13 the following week.

The album debuted at number 169 on the Billboard 200 chart in the week ending August 4, 1979. It peaked at number 137 in its fourth week on the chart. The album spent a total of ten weeks on the chart.

== Reception ==
Professional ratings
Review scores
Source	Rating
AllMusic	4.5/5 stars
Christgau's Record Guide	A−

Upon its release, Stateless received positive reviews from music critics.

The Village Voice's Robert Christgau called Lovich "an original" and found that her "goofy energy doesn't distract her from her feelings or damage her sex appeal or conceal a mawkish underside."

Billboard magazine said that Lovich was an artist "whose time has come" and had successfully "fashioned a unique identity" that was "on the mark in spirit and execution". Lovich was described as "an Eastern European Patti Smith" and her music was compared to the work of The Cars and Talking Heads, as well as "Volga boat songs" and "rock'n'roll girl groups". Billboard highlighted the tracks "Lucky Number", "Home", "Telepathy", "I Think We're Alone Now" and "Tonight" as the best songs of the album.

== Track listings ==
The album was re-issued in the United Kingdom following the success of "Lucky Number" with six tracks remixed by Roger Bechirian. The US version saw a further three tracks remixed.

=== Original 1978 version ===
Stiff Records SEEZ 7
No.	Title	Writer(s)	Length
1.	"Lucky Number"	Lene Lovich; Les Chappell	3:13
2.	"Sleeping Beauty"	Lovich; Chappell	3:30
3.	"Home"	Lovich; Chappell	3:42
4.	"Too Tender (To Touch)"	Lovich; Chappell	4:20
5.	"Say When"	Jimme O'Neill	2:48
6.	"Tonight"	Nick Lowe	4:34
7.	"Writing on the Wall"	Lovich; Chappell	3:35
8.	"Telepathy"	O'Neill	2:48
9.	"Momentary Breakdown"	Lovich; Chappell	3:04
10.	"One in a 1,000,000"	Lovich; Chappell	2:51
11.	"I Think We're Alone Now"	Richie Cordell	2:47
Total length:			37:19

=== UK Remixed version (1979) ===
Stiff Records SEEZ 7
No.	Title	Writer(s)	Length
1.	"Lucky Number" (Remix)	Lovich; Chappell	2:47
2.	"Sleeping Beauty"	Lovich; Chappell	3:30
3.	"Home"	Lovich; Chappell	3:42
4.	"Too Tender (To Touch)"	Lovich; Chappell	4:20
5.	"Say When" (Remix)	O'Neill	2:50
6.	"Tonight" (Remix)	Lowe	4:32
7.	"Writing on the Wall" (Remix)	Lovich; Chappell	3:10
8.	"Telepathy" (Remix)	O'Neill	2:46
9.	"Momentary Breakdown" (Remix)	Lovich; Chappell	3:20
10.	"One in a 1,000,000"	Lovich; Chappell	2:51
11.	"I Think We're Alone Now"	Cordell	2:47
Total length:			36:41

EU Line Records CD reissue (1991) – LICD 9.01066 O
No.	Title	Writer(s)	Notes	Length
12.	"Be Stiff"	Devo	From Be Stiff Tour (Stiff Records ODD 2)	2:37
13.	"Big Bird"	Lovich; Chappell	B-side of "Say When" (12")	3:26
14.	"The Fall"	Judge Smith	B-side of "Angels" (12")	3:38
Total length:				46:22

EU Stiff Records CD reissue (1993) – STIFFCD20 / Japan Poplot CD reissue (2001) – MTCY-1002
No.	Title	Writer(s)	Notes	Length
15.	"I Think We're Alone Now" (Japanese version)	Cordell	A-side of "I Think We're Alone Now" (UK 7" Version 2)	2:44
Total length:				49:06

=== US version (1979) ===
Stiff-Epic JE 36102
No.	Title	Writer(s)	Length
1.	"Home" (Remix)	Lovich; Chappell	3:41
2.	"Sleeping Beauty" (Remix)	Lovich; Chappell	3:00
3.	"Lucky Number" (Remix)	Lovich; Chappell	2:47
4.	"Too Tender (To Touch)" (Remix)	Lovich; Chappell	4:08
5.	"Say When" (Remix)	Jimme O'Neill	2:50
6.	"Writing on the Wall" (Remix)	Lovich; Chappell	3:10
7.	"Telepathy" (Remix)	O'Neill	2:46
8.	"Momentary Breakdown" (Remix)	Lovich; Chappell	3:20
9.	"I Think We're Alone Now"	Richie Cordell	2:45
10.	"One in a 1,000,000"	Lovich; Chappell	2:52
11.	"Tonight" (Remix)	Nick Lowe	4:32
Total length:			35:58

U.S. Rhino Records CD reissue (Stateless...Plus) (1991) – R2 70520
No.	Title	Writer(s)	Notes	Length
12.	"Be Stiff"	Devo	From Be Stiff Tour (Stiff Records ODD 2)	2:40
13.	"One Lonely Heart"	Lovich; Chappell	B-side of "Say When" (7" & 12")	3:21
14.	"Big Bird"	Lovich; Chappell	B-side of "Say When" (12")	3:27
15.	"The Fall"	Judge Smith	B-side of "Angels" (12")	3:41
16.	"Blue"	Lovich; Chappell	B-side of "It's You, Only You (Mein Schmerz)" (7" & 12")	3:00
17.	"I Think We're Alone Now" (Japanese version)	Cordell	A-side of "I Think We're Alone Now" (UK 7" Version 2)	2:47
Total length:				45:27

== Personnel ==
- Lene Lovich – vocals, saxophone
- Les Chappell – guitar, EMS synthesizer, percussion, vocals
- Jeff Smith – synthesizer
- Nick Plytas – Hammond organ, piano
- Ron François – bass, percussion, vocals
- Bobby Irwin – drums, percussion, vocals
- Don Snow – piano on "Too Tender (To Touch)"

Technical

- Aldo Bocca, Jeremy Green, Pete Fox, Roger Bechirian – engineer
- Brian Griffin – photography

Credits adapted from the album's liner notes.

== Charts ==
Chart (1978–79)	Peak position
Australian Albums (Kent Music Report)	13
Dutch Albums (Album Top 100)	17
New Zealand Albums (RMNZ)	19
UK Albums (OCC)	35
US Billboard 200 (Billboard)	137
