= Lucky Number (song) =

1979 single by Lene Lovich

- 7-inch single cover (1979)

Single by Lene Lovich

from the album Stateless
- B-side: "Home"
- Released: 1979
- Recorded: 1978
- Genre: New wave
- Length: 2:47
- Label: Stiff
- Songwriters: Lene Lovich; Les Chappell
- Producer: Les Chappell

Lene Lovich singles chronology
"I Think We're Alone Now" (1978)	"Lucky Number" (1979)	"Say When" (1979)

Alternative cover
- 7-inch single cover (1982)

"Lucky Number" is a song by American-British recording artist Lene Lovich. Originally released as a B-side for Lovich's cover of "I Think We're Alone Now", the song was re-released in 1979 by Stiff Records as an A-side and became the lead single of her debut studio album Stateless (1978). The song was written by Lovich and Les Chappell, who produced the song.

"Lucky Number" received very positive reviews from music critics and was a commercial success, peaking at number two in Australia, number three in the Netherlands, New Zealand and the United Kingdom, and number five in Belgium. The single also charted well in Ireland and Austria. It became a defining song of the new wave genre.

"Lucky Number" was covered by German punk artist Nina Hagen. The German version "Wir leben immer... noch" ("We are alive... still") was released on the album Unbehagen (1979).

== Background and recording ==
After the break-up of the band the Diversions in December 1976, Lovich started searching for another band. She contacted a radio presenter Charlie Gillett and advertised herself as a sax player looking for a band. Gillett gave out her number but nobody called. Later, Lovich wrote him a letter providing more information about herself. This encouraged him to get her to record a demo of Tommy James and the Shondells' song "I Think We're Alone Now". He took the tape to Dave Robinson of Stiff Records, who liked it and decided to sign Lovich. He immediately proposed the song to be released as a single and wanted Lovich and Les Chappell to write and record a B-side.

In July 1978, Stiff released the first limited quantities of "I Think We're Alone Now" with an early version of "Lucky Number". Lovich and Chappell went on to record her first album Stateless, which was released in October of the same year. "Lucky Number" gained recognition and was later re-released as a lead single from the album.

== Composition ==
The song is composed in D major at 120 beats per minute. The chorus consists of four dissonant notes sung in rapid succession. According to Lovich, she "didn't know anything about writing a song, so [the producer] just threw together a vocal line that sounded like a synthesizer." The chorus, coupled with a guitar ostinato and rapid vocal shouts from backup singers, gave the song and Lovich a sound that would define her next several records and, according to Rovi, "the hundreds of bands that followed."

== Critical reception ==
Billboard magazine named "Lucky Number" as one of its recommended "Top Single Picks" for the week ending July 28, 1979. The single's B-side "Home", which was released as a single in its own right in the United States, was later named as another "Top Single Pick" for the week ending September 15, 1979.

== Chart Performance ==
In Australia the single reached the top 10 in the week dated May 22, 1979. It peaked at number 2 in the week dated June 11, 1979 behind "Lay Your Love on Me" by Racey. "Lucky Number" was named by Billboard magazine as one of a number of hit singles in Australia in 1979 whose success was strongly aided by a music video clip.

== Track listings and formats ==
- 7-inch single (UK)
1. "Lucky Number" – 2:47
2. "Home" – 3:45
- 12-inch single (UK)
1. "Lucky Number" – 2:47
2. "Home" – 3:45
3. "Lucky Number" (Version)
- 7-inch single (US)
1. "Lucky Number" (Slavic Dance Version) – 4:32
2. "Lucky Number" - 2:47
- 7-inch single (UK)
1. "Lucky Number"
2. "New Toy"

== Charts ==
=== Weekly charts ===
Chart (1979)	Peak position
Australia (Kent Music Report)	2
Austria (Ö3 Austria Top 40)	18
Belgium (Ultratop 50 Flanders)	5
Ireland (IRMA)	7
Netherlands (Dutch Top 40)	3
Netherlands (Single Top 100)	4
New Zealand (Recorded Music NZ)	3
UK Singles (Official Charts)	3

=== Year-end charts ===
Chart (1979)	Position
Australia (Kent Music Report)	21
Belgium (Ultratop)	39
Netherlands (Dutch Top 40)	60
Netherlands (Single Top 100)	44
New Zealand (RIANZ)	38
UK Singles (OCC)	29

== Certifications ==
Region	Certification	Certified units/sales
United Kingdom (BPI)	Silver	250,000^{^}
^{^} Shipments figures based on certification alone.
