= Lene Lovich =

American singer (born 1949)

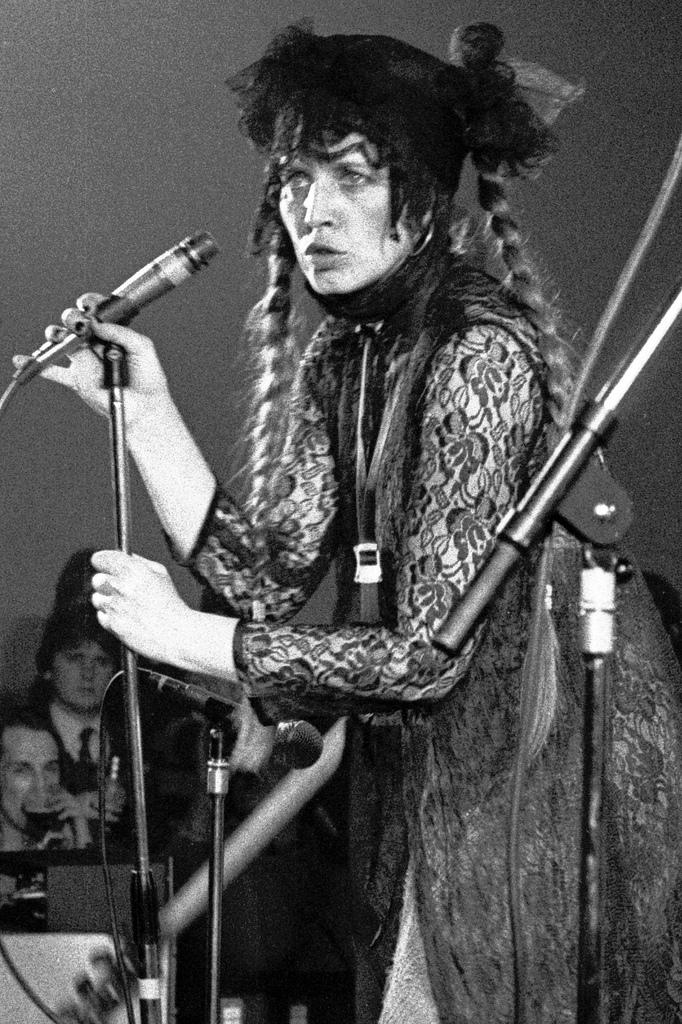
- Lovich in 1979

Background information
- Born: Lili-Marlene Premilovich; March 30, 1949 (age 77); Detroit, Michigan, U.S.
- Origin: London, England
- Genres: New wave; post-punk; space age pop
- Occupations: Singer; musician; songwriter
- Instruments: Vocals; saxophone
- Years active: 1975–1990; 2005–present
- Labels: Stiff (1978–82); Pathfinder / Justin Time (1989); Stereo Society (2005); Flex (2013–present)
- Website: lenelovich.net

Lili-Marlene Premilovich (born March 30, 1949), known professionally as Lene Lovich (/ˈleɪnə ˈlʌvɪtʃ/ LAY-nə LUV-itch), is an American-British singer. She first gained attention in 1979 with the release of her hit single "Lucky Number", which peaked at number 3 on the UK singles chart and made her a leading figure of the new wave music scene. She is also known for her eccentric hairstyle, clothing and quirky sense of humor while performing.

Born in Detroit, Michigan, Lovich moved to England at the age of 13, where she met guitarist and songwriter Les Chappell, who later became her long-time music collaborator and life partner. She developed an interest in art and theatre, enrolling at the Central School of Art and Design where she took saxophone lessons. In 1975, she joined the band the Diversions and shortly afterwards wrote the lyrics to Cerrone's single "Supernature". After the band broke up, Lovich started looking for another band to join and contacted the radio presenter Charlie Gillett, who got her to record a demo of Tommy James and the Shondells' song "I Think We're Alone Now" and played it to Dave Robinson of Stiff Records, who decided to sign Lovich. The song was released as a single and appeared on her debut studio album Stateless (1978), which produced the single "Lucky Number".

She released two more albums, Flex (1979) and No Man's Land (1982), on Stiff Records. In 1989, she independently released the album March, before her 15-year hiatus. She focused more on her family but returned in 2005 with the release of her album Shadows and Dust. In 2013, she established her own publishing label, Flex Music, and released a re-mastered version of all her previous albums in a limited edition box set.

== Life and career ==
=== 1949–1975: Early life and career beginnings ===
Lovich was born Lili-Marlene Premilovich in Detroit, Michigan, on March 30, 1949, to an English mother and American father of Serbian descent. After her father developed health problems, her mother took the 13-year-old Lovich and her three siblings to live in Hull, East Yorkshire, England. She met guitarist/songwriter Les Chappell when they were teenagers, and he became her longtime collaborator and life partner. In the autumn of 1968, they went to London to attend art school. It was there that Lovich first tied her hair into the plaits that later became a visual trademark, though at first she braided her hair to keep it out of the clay when studying sculpture.

Over the following decade, Lovich attended several art schools, busked around the London Underground and appeared in cabaret clubs as an "Oriental" dancer. She also travelled to Spain, where she visited Salvador Dalí at his home. She played acoustic rock music around London, sang in the mass choir of a show called Quintessence at the Royal Albert Hall, played a soldier in Arthur Brown's show, worked as a go-go dancer with the Radio One Roadshow, toured Italy with a West Indian soul band and played saxophone for Bob Flag's Balloon and Banana Band and for an all-girl cabaret trio called the Sensations. She recorded screams for horror films, wrote lyrics for French disco star Cerrone (including the sci-fi dance smash "Supernature", later recorded by Lovich) and worked with various fringe theatre groups. She was also one of thousands of audience members invited to sing along at the 1972 Lanchester Arts Festival at the Locarno Ballroom in Coventry when Chuck Berry recorded "My Ding-a-Ling" for Chess Records.

In 1975, Lovich joined the Diversions, a funk group that released three singles and an album on Polydor Records without success.

=== 1976–1985: Stateless, Flex, No Man's Land ===
In 1976, Lovich released a 7" three-track "maxi-single" in the UK under her own name, aimed at the Christmas market: "I Saw Mommy Kissing Santa Claus/The Christmas Song (Merry Christmas To You)/Happy Christmas" (Polydor 2058 812). In 1977, Lovich, along with recording engineer Alain Wisniak, provided lyrics for "Supernature" a song featuring music composed by French percussionist and disco music performer Cerrone. The song, with its surreal lyrics describing a world in which nature has risen to fight against desecration and destruction by humanity, is indicative of Lovich's interest in animal rights issues. In 1978, disc jockey and author Charlie Gillett presented her recording of "I Think We're Alone Now", a cover version of a song originally performed by Tommy James and the Shondells, to Stiff Records boss Dave Robinson. Robinson immediately suggested releasing it as a single on Stiff, for which Lovich and Chappell had to write and record a B-side at short notice. They came up with "Lucky Number", which was then released as an A-side and became a Top 3 hit in the UK Singles Chart.

Invited by Robinson to participate in the forthcoming Be Stiff Route 78 Tour in 1978, Lovich quickly recorded her first album for Stiff, Stateless, which contained "Lucky Number" and another Top 20 hit, "Say When". Lovich's musical style combined her own quirky inventions with contemporary punk rock and new wave styles. She then recorded the albums Flex and No-Man's-Land for Stiff over the next few years, as well as an EP titled New Toy, the title cut penned by touring band member Thomas Dolby. She also recorded vocals for "Picnic Boy" by the Residents.

Lovich co-wrote with Chappell and Chris Judge Smith and performed Mata Hari, a play/musical at the Lyric Hammersmith, London in October and November 1982. During this time she was having disputes with Stiff. The success of the show and pressure from Epic, her U.S. label, persuaded Stiff to release and promote No Man's Land.

=== 1986–1990: March ===
Following her departure from Stiff, Lovich released "Don't Kill the Animals," a single with Nina Hagen, with whom she had appeared in Cha Cha, a film that starred Herman Brood; together, the three created the film's soundtrack.

In May 1987, Lovich performed with a band for the first time in years at a small club in Austin Texas called The Cave Club (now called Elysium). She had been doing a series of events for PETA where she sang to prerecorded tapes. For this show, she was joined by the electronic duo Tanz Waffen (based out of Austin). Les Chappell, longtime partner, was not at this show. That sparked a renewed interest from Lovich in touring.

Starting in 1988, Lovich toured the US (and a little in Canada) with Tanz Waffen both opening the shows as well as being her backing band in conjunction with Les Chappell.

In 1989, Lovich recorded the album March on Pathfinder Records. It was only moderately successful and was not released until nearly a year after the album's single "Wonderland" had been issued and had become an American dance hit. She also toured the U.S. three times immediately before, during and shortly after the release of March, giving American fans their only glimpse of her for many years to come. Two of the three tours culminated with benefit concerts for People for the Ethical Treatment of Animals including one at the Washington Monument in 1988 and one in New York City in 1989. Both of those shows were hosted by The B-52s.

Lovich contributed to the opera The Fall of the House of Usher (1991) by Peter Hammill and Judge Smith, singing the part of Madeline Usher.

=== 2005–present ===
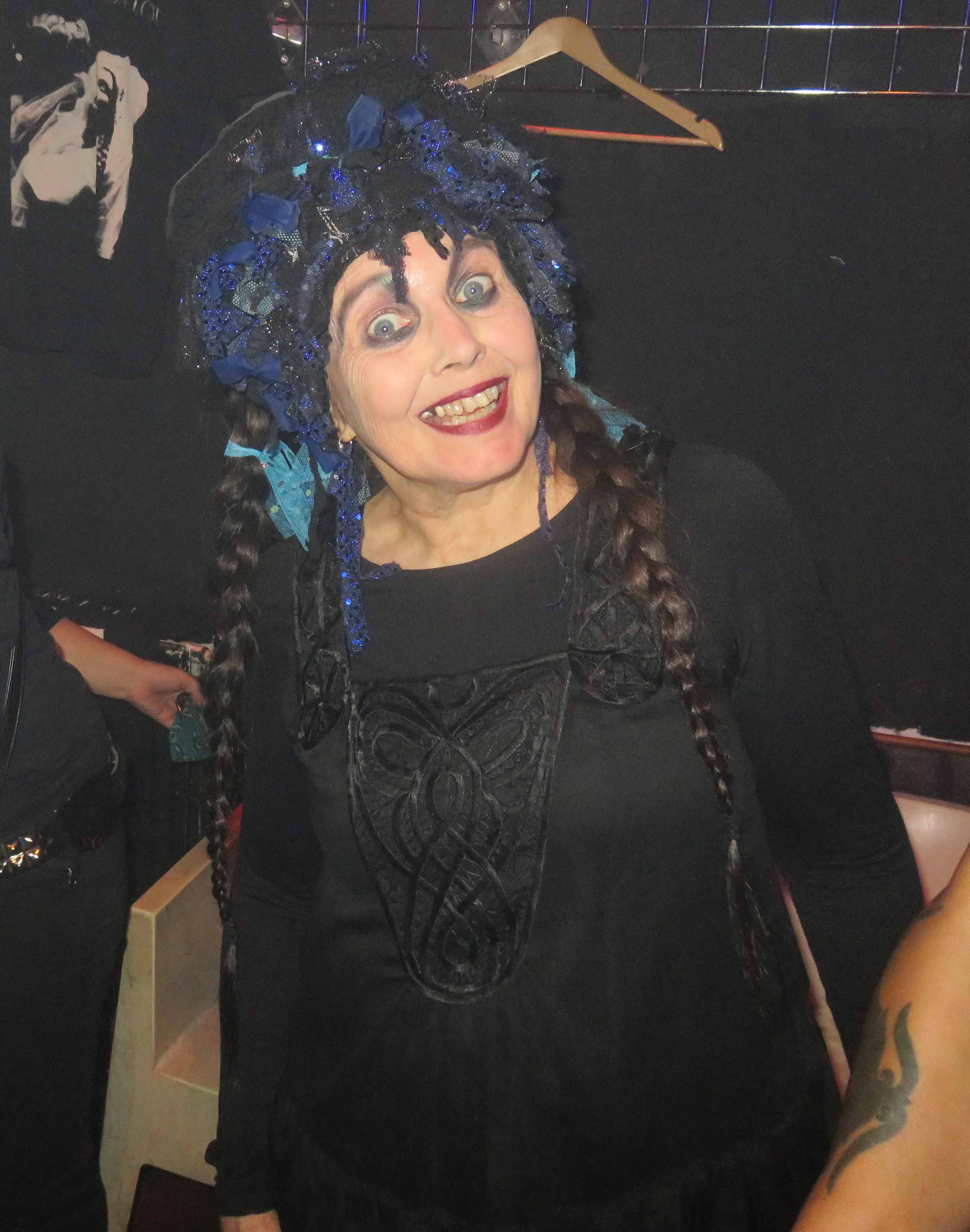
Lovich in 2017

In 2005, Lovich appeared on Hawkwind's Take Me to Your Leader CD and appeared occasionally on stage with them. Lovich's first album since March, entitled Shadows and Dust, received a limited release on the Stereo Society label on September 13, 2005. She played for the first time in many years with a full band at the Drop Dead Festival in 2006.

In 2006, Lovich made a guest appearance with the Dresden Dolls at The Roundhouse that is featured as an extra on the band's DVD Live at the Roundhouse.

In 2007, MVD Visual released the DVD Lene Lovich: Live from New York, featuring a 1981 performance at Studio 54. In late 2007, Lovich and Chappell produced a new recording of their hit "Lucky Number", which was performed by rock group Eastroad and was used by BBC Television for its coverage of the 2008 World Snooker Championship.

In 2011, Lovich sang the part of Eurydice in the song story Orfeas by Judge Smith. In 2013, she sang on the albums Zoot Suit by Judge Smith and Gridlock by Mr. Averell.

In 2012, Lovich began performing with a new band comprising Subterraneans frontman Jude Rawlins on guitar, bassist Lydia Fischer, keyboard player Kirsten Morrison and Morgan King on drums. This marked the first time that Les Chappell was not part of her band.

The Lene Lovich Band made its live debut at London's 12 Bar Club on October 29, 2012. In 2013, the band undertook its first high-profile tour, concluding with shows in London and Berlin, and with an appearance at the Rebellion Festival. Valkyrie replaced Fischer on bass in 2014 as the band undertook its first major European tour. The band performed at Rebellion again in 2017, before undertaking Lovich's largest tour in 27 years, opening for the Psychedelic Furs.

In September 2013, Lovich and Rawlins created the record label Flex Music, giving Lovich control of her back catalogue for the first time. Flex Music was launched with a limited-edition handmade CD box set entitled Others: Volume 1, which contained Lovich's first three albums and a bonus CD of rarities. In 2015, Flex reissued Lovich's 1982 album No Man's Land in digital format.

In November 2023, Cherry Red Records released a 4-CD box set, Toy Box, containing material Lovich recorded for Stiff Records between 1978 and 1983.

In 2025, Lene Lovich appeared in a number of solo shows in North America and opened for The B-52s and Devo on their North American "Cosmic De-Evolution" tour.

== Discography ==
- Stateless (1978)
- Flex (1980)
- No Man's Land (1982)
- March (1989)
- Shadows and Dust (2005)

== Filmography ==
Film and television
Year	Title	Role	Notes
1979	Cha-Cha		
1982	Rock (TV movie)	Lola	
1993	Queen of Fruit (TV short)		
