= For Your Consideration (film) =

2006 film by Christopher Guest

- Theatrical release poster
- Directed by: Christopher Guest
- Written by: Christopher Guest; Eugene Levy
- Produced by: Karen Murphy
- Starring: Bob Balaban; Jennifer Coolidge; Christopher Guest; John Michael Higgins; Eugene Levy; Jane Lynch; Michael McKean; Catherine O'Hara; Parker Posey; Harry Shearer; Fred Willard
- Cinematography: Roberto Schaefer
- Edited by: Robert Leighton
- Music by: C. J. Vanston
- Production companies: Castle Rock Entertainment; Shangri-La Entertainment
- Distributed by: Warner Independent Pictures
- Release date: November 17, 2006
- Running time: 86 minutes
- Country: United States
- Language: English
- Budget: $12 million
- Box office: $5.9 million

For Your Consideration is a 2006 American comedy film directed by Christopher Guest. It was co-written by Guest and Eugene Levy, and both also star in the film. The film's title is a phrase used in trade advertisements to promote films for honors such as the Academy Awards. The plot revolves around a group of three actors who learn that their performances in the fictional film they have not even completed yet, Home for Purim, a drama set in the mid-1940s American South, are supposedly generating a great deal of award-season buzz.

Many of the cast have appeared in Guest's previous films Waiting for Guffman, Best in Show, and A Mighty Wind, including Levy, Catherine O'Hara, Parker Posey, Harry Shearer, Michael McKean, Fred Willard, Larry Miller, Bob Balaban, Jennifer Coolidge, Jane Lynch, Ed Begley Jr., Michael Hitchcock, John Michael Higgins, and Jim Piddock. Ricky Gervais, the co-creator of the original British television series The Office, also appears, while Paul Dooley, John Krasinski, Richard Kind, Scott Adsit, Hart Bochner, Claire Forlani, and Sandra Oh make brief cameos. Though the dialogue is largely improvised by the actors as in Guest's earlier films, the format is a departure from the mockumentary style.

The film received its world premiere at the Toronto International Film Festival on September 10, 2006. It was produced by Warner Independent Pictures in association with Castle Rock Entertainment and Shangri-La Entertainment.

== Plot ==
The film follows the production of Home for Purim, a low-budget drama film about a Jewish family in the Southern United States in the 1940s. The cast consists of character actress Marilyn Hack as the family's dying matriarch; veteran actor turned kosher hot dog mascot Victor Allen Miller as her husband; ingénue Callie Webb as their lesbian daughter, whose return home with her girlfriend serves as the driving plot of Home for Purim; and Brian Chubb, who is dating Webb, as their son.

The film's director constantly incorporates bizarre camera shots and acting notes, while the producer, heiress to a diaper service, knows nothing about producing films. The two screenwriters are at odds with the director, as they struggle to align the film's period Southern setting with incongruous Jewish references and words.

When an unattributed rumor begins to circulate that Hack, Miller, and Webb are likely to receive Oscar nominations for the film, each begins obsessing about the award. Hack pretends not to care while secretly pining for the award, Miller demands a higher salary and pushes his agent for more dignified work, and Webb breaks up with Chubb. Later, the hosts of entertainment news program Hollywood Now visit the set and interview the cast.

The studio intervenes in the production of Home for Purim and, deeming the film to be "too Jewish," re-title it Home for Thanksgiving. Despite this, the Oscar buzz around the film intensifies, and the three prospective nominees begin to make press appearances to promote the film. Miller appears on a hip-hop teen show called Chillaxin' in youthful attire with capped teeth, a tan, and dyed blonde hair. Hack gets breast implants and extensive plastic surgery to the point where her face is comically ecstatic. Webb goes on a shock jock radio show, only to field questions exclusively about her nude scenes.

The Academy Award nominations are announced, and only Chubb (who sleeps through the morning of the announcement) is nominated. Miller returns to auditioning for commercials. Webb attempts to revive her failed one-woman show, No Penis Intended. Hack makes a drunken rant on Hollywood Now and becomes an acting teacher, having uncomfortably made peace with her mediocre career.

== Cast ==
- Catherine O'Hara as Marilyn Hack
- Ed Begley Jr. as Sandy Lane
- Eugene Levy as Morley Orfkin
- Harry Shearer as Victor Allan Miller
- Christopher Guest as Jay Berman
- John Michael Higgins as Corey Taft
- Jim Piddock as Simon Whitset
- Jennifer Coolidge as Whitney Taylor Brown
- Parker Posey as Callie Webb
- Rachael Harris as Debbie Gilchrist
- Christopher Moynihan as Brian Chubb
- Paul Dooley as Paper Badge Sgt.
- John Krasinski as Paper Badge Officer
- Don Lake as "Love It" critic Ben Lilly
- Michael Hitchcock as "Hate It" critic David van Zyverdan
- Sandra Oh as Marketing Person
- Richard Kind as Marketing Person
- Bob Balaban as Philip Koontz
- Michael McKean as Lane Iverson
- Ari Graynor as Young PA
- Scott Adsit as First AD
- Simon Helberg as Junior Agent
- Kevin Sussman as Commercial Director
- Fred Willard as Chuck
- Jane Lynch as Cindy
- Jordan Black as Whitney's Assistant
- Nina Conti as Weather Woman
- Mary McCormack as Pilgrim Woman
- Shawn Christian as Pilgrim Man
- Deborah Theaker as Liz Fenneman
- Ricky Gervais as Martin Gibb
- Larry Miller as Syd Finkleman
- Craig Bierko as Talk Show Host
- Loudon Wainwright as Nominee Ben Connelly
- Jessica St. Clair as Hula Balls Spokeswoman
- Casey Wilson as Young Actress
- Derek Waters as Young Actor

== Reception ==
=== Critical reception ===
Based on 163 reviews collected by the film review aggregator Rotten Tomatoes, 53% of critics gave For Your Consideration a positive review, with an average rating of 5.90/10. The critical consensus reads: "As the object of satire gets bigger the jokes become thinner, and Christopher Guest isn't as droll or insightful here than [sic] when he was lampooning smaller subjects." Metacritic, which uses a weighted average, assigned the film a score of 68 out of 100, based on 33 critics, indicating "generally favorable" reviews.

Leonard Maltin gave the film three stars, describing it as "uncanny in its dead-on parodies of TV and radio talk shows and other follies of show business”.

== Accolades ==
Catherine O'Hara won Best Supporting Actress awards from the National Board of Review, Kansas City Film Critics Circle, and New York Film Critics Online. She was also nominated for an Independent Spirit Award for Best Female Lead, and received several Supporting Actress nominations for a New York Film Critics Circle Award, Critics Choice Award, Gold Derby Award, Chlotrudis Award, and an AARP Movies for Grownups Award for Best Supporting Actress.

Additionally, the film's principal cast was honored with Best Ensemble performance nominations for both a Chlotrudis Award and a Gotham Award. Guest, as director, was nominated for the Grand Special Prize at the Deauville Film Festival. The film itself was nominated for a Critics Choice Award for Best Comedy Film. O'Hara's performance earned many good reviews, spurring for a short time rumors that, in an ironic twist, she could be nominated for an Academy Award. In the end, the film did not receive any Academy Award nominations.

== See also ==
- List of films featuring fictional films
- Oscar bait
