= Best in Show (film) =

2000 film by Christopher Guest

- Theatrical release poster
- Directed by: Christopher Guest
- Written by: Christopher Guest; Eugene Levy
- Produced by: Gordon Mark; Karen Murphy
- Starring: Jennifer Coolidge; Christopher Guest; John Michael Higgins; Michael Hitchcock; Eugene Levy; Jane Lynch; Michael McKean; Catherine O'Hara; Parker Posey
- Cinematography: Roberto Schaefer
- Edited by: Robert Leighton
- Music by: C. J. Vanston
- Production company: Castle Rock Entertainment
- Distributed by: Warner Bros. Pictures
- Release dates: September 8, 2000 (TIFF); September 29, 2000 (United States)
- Running time: 90 minutes
- Country: United States
- Language: English
- Budget: $10 million
- Box office: $20.8 million

Best in Show is a 2000 American mockumentary comedy film co-written by Christopher Guest and Eugene Levy and directed by Guest. The film follows five entrants in a prestigious dog show as they travel to and compete at the show, and stars Guest and Levy alongside Jennifer Coolidge, John Michael Higgins, Michael Hitchcock, Jane Lynch, Michael McKean, Catherine O'Hara, and Parker Posey. Much of the dialogue was improvised. Many of the comic actors were also involved in Guest's other films, including Waiting for Guffman, A Mighty Wind, For Your Consideration, and Mascots. The film's score was composed by C. J. Vanston.

Best in Show premiered at TIFF on September 8, 2000 before being released by Warner Bros. Pictures on September 29, 2000 in the United States. The film received positive reviews from critics and grossed $20.8 million against a $10 million budget.

== Plot ==
Five dogs and their owners, trainers, and handlers travel to Philadelphia to compete in the Mayflower Kennel Club Dog Show.

Gerry and Cookie Fleck are a middle-class couple from Florida who arrive at the Taft Hotel with their Norwich Terrier Winky. After having forgotten to pay their credit card bill and short of cash, they are forced to sleep in the hotel's storage room. While traveling to the show, they encounter several of Cookie's former lovers who try to seduce her again, to Gerry's chagrin.

Meg and Hamilton Swan, a stereotypical yuppie couple from a Chicago suburb, arrive with their weimaraner Beatrice. Their constant doting and neurotic behavior toward Beatrice—for example, taking her to a psychotherapist after she sees them having sex in a position they learned from the Kama Sutra—confuses and upsets her.

Harlan Pepper, the affable Southern owner of a fishing goods store and an aspiring ventriloquist, arrives with his bloodhound Hubert. The Pepper family has raised a variety of hounds for generations.

Sherri Ann Cabot is the socially inept, overly glamorous trophy wife of her elderly sugar daddy Leslie Ward Cabot. A former two-time winner of the show, she receives help with her Standard Poodle Rhapsody in White, also known as Butch, from her taskmaster trainer Christy Cummings. An extremely competitive butch lesbian, Christy rigorously trains Butch for the show and rejects Sherri Ann's offers of a beauty makeover. Leslie is oblivious to Christy and Sherri Ann's romantic involvement, as well as everything else happening around him.

Scott Donlan and Stefan Vanderhoof are a campy gay couple who take great pride in their Shih Tzu Miss Agnes and are confident that she will win the competition. They share a love of old movies and enjoy making fun of Christy Cummings but are friendly to the other competitors, especially the Flecks.

The dog show is hosted by dog expert Trevor Beckwith and oblivious "color" commentator Buck Laughlin, whose inane banter is lost on Beckwith. During the first round, Beatrice is disqualified when she becomes aggressive and Hamilton cannot control her, which the Swans chalk up to a dog toy of Beatrice's that they had lost prior to the show. The other four dogs advance to the final round. Just before the finals, Cookie dislocates her knee and insists that Gerry take over for her despite his literal two left feet (the result of a birth defect). Though Gerry is nervous, Winky takes Best in Show.

After the competition, Gerry and Cookie return home to Florida and enjoy brief fame. While in a studio recording novelty songs about terriers, they discover that the recording engineer is yet another of Cookie's ex-lovers, to Gerry's frustration. Christy and Sherri Ann, now openly in a relationship (Leslie's fate is unclear), publish American Bitch, a magazine for lesbian owners of purebred dogs. After spending weeks on a kibbutz, Harlan fulfills his dream of being a ventriloquist, entertaining sparse crowds with a honky tonk song-and-dance number. Stefan and Scott design a calendar featuring Shih Tzu dogs in costume appearing in scenes from classic films such as Casablanca and Gone with the Wind. Meg and Hamilton are visibly happier together after replacing Beatrice with a pug named Kipper, whom they claim enjoys watching them have sex.

== Cast ==
=== Actors ===
- Eugene Levy as Gerry Fleck
- Catherine O'Hara as Cookie Fleck
- John Michael Higgins as Scott Donlan
- Michael McKean as Stefan Vanderhoof
- Michael Hitchcock as Hamilton Swan
- Parker Posey as Meg Swan
- Jennifer Coolidge as Sherri Ann Cabot
- Jane Lynch as Christy Cummings
- Christopher Guest as Harlan Pepper
- Larry Miller as Max Berman
- Linda Kash as Fay Berman
- Jim Piddock as Trevor Beckwith
- Fred Willard as Buck Laughlin
- Ed Begley Jr. as Mark Schafer
- Lynda Boyd as Cabot Party Guest
- Teryl Rothery as Philly AM Host
- Tony Alcantar as Philly AM Chef
- Camille Sullivan as Philly AM Assistant
- Patrick Cranshaw as Leslie Ward Cabot
- Will Sasso as Dale the Fishin' Hole Guy
- Bob Balaban as Theodore W. Millbank III
- Don Lake as Graham Chissolm
- Jay Brazeau as Dr. Chuck Nelken
- Hiro Kanagawa as Pet Shop Owner
- Don S. Davis as Mayflower Best in Show Judge Everett Bainbridge
- Rachael Harris as Winky's Party Guest
- Deborah Theaker as Winky's Party Guest
- Lewis Arquette as Fern City Show Spectator
- Colin Cunningham as New York Butcher
- Fulvio Cecere as Airport Passerby
- Carmen Aguirre as Taft Hotel Maid
- Peter Kelamis as Bartender (scene deleted)
- Fred Keating as Jack (scene deleted)

=== Dogs ===
The starring dogs listed are denoted by their registered names. All have earned the title Ch., indicating they have qualified for a championship at conformation shows, with most qualifying for the Canadian Kennel Club Championship—hence the prefix Can. The kennel prefix of one or more breeders precedes each dog's registered name; e. g. in "Arokat Echobar Take Me Dancing", the first breeder is "Arokat" and the second is "Echobar" while the name is "Take Me Dancing". The registered name differs from the dog's call name, which is used to talk to the animal. For example, Arokat Echobar Take Me Dancing's call name is "Peach".

- Can Ch. Arokat Echobar Take Me Dancing - Beatrice the Weimaraner
- Can Ch. Urchin's Bryllo - Winky the Norwich Terrier
- Ch. Quiet Creek's Stand By Me - Hubert the Bloodhound
- Can Ch. Rapture's Classic - Miss Agnes the Shih Tzu
- Can Ch. Symarun's Red Hot Kisses - Tyrone the Shih Tzu
- Can Ch. Exxel's Dezi Duz It With Pizaz - Rhapsody in White (Butch) the Standard Poodle

== Production ==
Filming took place in Vancouver and Los Angeles. In a 2000 interview, Christopher Guest reflected, "Originally, we thought it would be easier to go to an actual dog show and film there, but nobody would let us do that." Eugene Levy adds that, "We actually had to stage our own dog show. And that's where the nightmare started. We literally had to put everything together from scratch, get somebody to organize the whole show, get the dogs in, find trainers and so forth."

The greater part of the film was improvised by the actors, with little to no planning. Sixty hours of footage were filmed, as was the case with Guest's previous mockumentary Waiting for Guffman. Levy said, "There is a much wider appeal for this movie than for Waiting for Guffman, which was a funny movie and a funny premise but not as accessible as this film, which is more mainstream. People just love dogs." Waiting for Guffman premiered on the festival circuit, and a few months later in early 1997, played to just roughly 50 theaters in the United States. It was distributed by Sony's arthouse division Sony Pictures Classics, while this film was distributed by the more commercial Warner Bros. Pictures, and played in 497 theaters.

== Reception ==
Best in Show received critical acclaim. The film has a 93% approval rating on Rotten Tomatoes, based on 118 reviews with an average rating of 7.5/10. The website's critical consensus reads, "A fine example of writer/director/star Christopher Guest's gift for improvisation comedy, Best in Show boasts an appealingly quirky premise and a brilliantly talented cast." The film also has a score of 78 out of 100 on Metacritic, based on 33 critics, indicating "generally favorable" reviews. It won American, British, and Canadian Comedy Awards. The film is number 38 on Bravo's "100 Funniest Movies". A 2022 Rolling Stone review of the best comedy films of the 21st century ranked this as first. In June 2025, the film ranked number 57 on The New York Times' list of "The 100 Best Movies of the 21st Century" and was one of the films voted for the "Readers' Choice" edition of the list, finishing at number 117. In July 2025, it ranked number 80 on Rolling Stone's list of "The 100 Best Movies of the 21st Century."

The film opened to a weekend gross of $413,436 to 13 theatres with an average of $31,802 per theater. After opening to a total of 497 theaters, the film ended its run with a domestic total of $18,715,392. The foreign gross of $2,074,164 brought its total gross revenue to $20,789,556.

== Legacy ==
Best in Show was the inspiration for the broadcast of the National Dog Show, which has aired each Thanksgiving on NBC since 2002.

To celebrate Halloween 2022, former Victorious castmates Ariana Grande and Elizabeth Gillies paid homage to Best in Show by recreating several scenes from the movie in which they each dressed up as multiple characters. After shooting in May, the results were then posted to Instagram on October 28 and drew praise from Jennifer Coolidge.

== See also ==
- Westminster Kennel Club Dog Show

== Works cited ==
- Greiving, Tim (September 29, 2020). "The Oral History of 'Best in Show'". The Ringer.
