= The Folksmen =

Fictional folk music trio

The Folksmen are a fictitious American folk music trio, conceived and performed by actors-comedians-musicians Christopher Guest, Michael McKean, and Harry Shearer. Originally created in 1984 for a Saturday Night Live sketch, the Folksmen have subsequently maintained an intermittent public presence for more than twenty-five years. The trio is best known for its depiction in the mockumentary film A Mighty Wind (2003), but has also made a number of meta-performances on stage and television, often in conjunction with the same creators' fictitious heavy metal band, Spinal Tap.

== Film, television and concert depictions ==
Guest, McKean and Shearer first appeared as the Folksmen on the November 3, 1984, episode of Saturday Night Live, the fourth episode of season 10. Guest and Shearer had both joined SNL as cast members that season (though Shearer was previously an SNL cast member for the 1979-1980 season), while McKean was hosting that episode. All three had previously worked together on comedy projects involving musical parody, including the Lenny and the Squigtones LP and a television pilot, The TV Show, which marked the first appearance of Spinal Tap. The SNL sketch, entitled "The Folksmen Reunion", had a similar satirical intent, targeting the renewed interest in American folk music following then-recent reunions of such artists as Peter, Paul & Mary (1978), The Weavers (1980), and The Kingston Trio (1981).

Introduced by Pamela Stephenson, the SNL sketch depicted the Folksmen as caricatures of semi-retired folk musicians: three conservatively dressed middle-aged men, spouting homilies and performing simplistic songs with cloying lyrics. In a 2009 interview, Shearer stated that the songs were intended to satirize "the fake folk music being written in office buildings in Manhattan's Upper West Side."

Guest, McKean and Shearer made a cameo appearance as the Folksmen in the 1992 film The Return of Spinal Tap, which documented the latter group's real-life reunion concert at Royal Albert Hall in London. When the trio subsequently toured as Spinal Tap during 2001, they would occasionally perform in the guise of the Folksmen as an ostensible "opening act"; not all of the audiences appreciated (or even understood) this in-joke, with one appearance in New York City reportedly being booed by a restless audience. Of this twist, Shearer once stated: "You can think you're in control of the amusing notion of the wrong act opening for a rock band—but when you actually find yourself being the wrong act, it doesn't feel any better." In a 2009 interview, Guest reflected further on the phenomenon:

One time, we had The Folksmen open for Spinal Tap because we always wanted to do a culmination of our entirely different personas. So there we were in caps playing folk music, opening for Spinal Tap, and the audience looked completely bewildered, like "What the fuck is going on here?" It was great. My son was at the show, and asked, "Mom, when are the old guys getting off and loud guys coming on?" That may have been a moment of weirdness for some people, but so what?

The line between fiction and reality had previously blurred when, in 1993, Guest, McKean and Shearer performed as The Folksmen at a genuine folk festival held at UCLA in Los Angeles, alongside such real-life folk artists as Arlo Guthrie, Joni Mitchell and Peter, Paul & Mary. According to Guest, the Folksmen went over "better than the other acts", while McKean recalled that "Paul Stookey of Peter, Paul & Mary looked at us and muttered, 'Too close, too close.'"

The Folksmen were incorporated into Christopher Guest's mockumentary A Mighty Wind (2003), which depicted a reunion concert of three fictitious folk music acts, following the death of their mutual manager, Irving Steinbloom. The film included interviews with the band members (which established much of their fictional backstory), reconstructed vintage footage and album covers, and various original songs performed in rehearsal as well as the purported concert, An Ode to Irving. To publicise the film, Guest, McKean and Shearer appeared as the Folksmen on a number of television programs, in which they performed songs and were interviewed in character. Between September and November 2003, the three fictitious folk groups from the film "reformed" to undertake a real-life concert tour of cities on the West Coast (Los Angeles, San Francisco, and Seattle) and the East Coast (Boston; Philadelphia; New York; and Washington, D.C.).

In April 2009, Guest, McKean and Shearer embarked upon the Unwigged & Unplugged tour to mark the 25th anniversary of the release of the film This is Spinal Tap. This time, they appeared as themselves, performing songs associated with Spinal Tap, the Folksmen and various other film and comedy projects from their long careers. After touring thirty cities in the United States, the trio performed a special "One Night Only World Tour" concert at London's Wembley Arena on June 30, 2009, in which they performed (this time in full costume) as both Spinal Tap and the Folksmen.

== Personnel ==
The fictional members of the Folksmen are:

- Alan Barrows (played by Christopher Guest) – vocals (tenor), guitar, banjo, mandolin
- Jerry Palter (played by Michael McKean) – vocals (baritone), guitar, mandolin
- Mark/Marta Shubb (played by Harry Shearer) – vocals (bass), double bass

During televised appearances, Barrows/Guest has also been seeing playing the autoharp (on "Barnyard Symphony", as performed on Saturday Night Live in 1984) and penny whistle (on "Corn Wine", in a deleted scene from A Mighty Wind). The studio recording of "Skeletons of Quinto", included on the film's soundtrack CD, included guest appearances from prominent musicians David Nichtern (nylon string guitar) and Marston Smith (cello).

== Fictional backstory ==
=== Origins and early fame ===
Characteristically, there is some dispute regarding the origins of the Folksmen. It was once claimed that the three members of the group originally met while they were freshmen at Ohio Wesleyan University in Delaware, Ohio. However, in a 2003 interview, Mark Shubb and Alan Barrows stated that the two had actually met in late 1961 when both were studying at the University of Vermont in Burlington, Vermont. Barrows recalled that "we were both interested in folk music and there was a big folk music scene, as there were at many colleges." They subsequently formed a musical duo known as The Twobadors. As recorded in an official band biography, later issued by Folktown Records, "In 1961, Vermont's own The Twobadors boarded a bus bound for New York City. Their first stop: Greenwich Village and The Folk Place. Inside, performing on the legendary stage was Jerry Palter". Palter, who was performing there as a guitarist and backing singer, sang baritone. As Barrows noted, "Mark was a bass singer and I was a tenor singer, so we had lead—no glue, no middle. We ended up getting together, and it just clicked." As their official bio put it, "Alan and Mark had found their mid-range, and the Folksmen were born".

The newly renamed trio soon attracted the attention of folk music impresario Irving Steinbloom (1920–2003), who became their manager and signed them to Folktown Records – as Palter once put it, "THE label to be on." In 1962, the group released the single "Old Joe's Place", which became a Top 70 hit and remains their best-known song. According to one source, the Folksmen remained together for 26 months (i.e. two and a half years), during which time they "played and sang their own brand of 'eclectified folk' music." During this time they released no fewer than five studio albums. In a 2003 interview, Barrow recalled: "We figured that it would be amusing, at least to us, to have one word album titles, and we'd lop off the g's." This, however, eventually came to a halt when, as Shubb noted in the same interview: "We violated our covenant with the audience with a record called Saying Something, which is two mistakes by my account – two words, and two g's. All of our goodwill and tradition and good luck went down the toilet." Compounding the problem, that album was released on a lesser subsidiary label, Folktone Records, which, as Palter notes, was "a decent label – they just didn't have the distribution." The album, elsewhere described as "their one and only experiment in electric", was not a success, and the trio disbanded soon afterward. Relegated to the status of a minor footnote in the annals of American folk music, the Folksmen would later be characterised as "the group who were too popular to be purist and too purist to be popular."

=== Reunions ===
Little is known of the activities of the band members after its demise around 1968. In the early 1970s, Alan Barrows began teaching a creative writing course at Swarthmore College near Philadelphia and also taught a yoga class. In 1984, folk music impresario Albert Lilienthal (best known as the man who established the Eighty-eight Cent Hoot at the Seaman's Institute) invited the Folksmen to re-form for a special one-off appearance on Saturday Night Live. At the time, it was noted that this was the first time that they had performed together in almost twenty years. Their appearance prompted a renewed interest in the group's work, and it was subsequently reported that "they are again becoming a popular late addition to folk festivals within a day's auto travel of their homes."

In 1992, the trio was scheduled to open for heavy metal band Spinal Tap during the latter's comeback concert at the Royal Albert Hall in London. However, there was some concern that the rowdy audience might threaten the safety of the performers, so they did not appear; instead, the Folksmen attempted to recoup their costs by busking, performing a version of "Kumbaya" inside South Kensington tube station. It was later reported on Spinal Tap's website that the Folksmen had signed a four-month lease on a 1994 Chrysler minivan in anticipation of Spinal Tap's proposed 1996 Third World Tour, and there were rumours that the Folksmen might put out a CD. However, neither the anticipated tour, nor the album, ever eventuated.

In June 1993, the Folksmen appeared at the Troubadors of Folk festival at UCLA in Los Angeles, where they performed on the same bill as Paul Stookey, Mary Chapin Carpenter, Roger McGuinn and others. (Stookey allegedly saw the Folksmen and muttered, "Too close, too close.") Eight years later, they returned to UCLA to make a guest appearance at a tribute concert, The Harry Smith Project, dedicated to the late folk music anthologist Harry Everett Smith.

In 2003, the Folksmen reunited far more prominently for another tribute concert, this time in honour of their former manager, Irving Steinbloom, who died that year. In the days leading up to the concert, the trio met for a reunion barbecue in upstate New York, during which they rehearsed several numbers from their back catalogue including "Blood on the Coal," "Corn Wine," "Loco Man," and "Skeletons of Quinto." At the concert itself, the group originally intended to open with "Never Did No Wanderin". Unbeknownst to them, The New Main Street Singers, another Steinbloom-managed group performing that night, end up performing the song. Reluctantly, The Folksmen instead performed only their hit, "Old Joe's Place," and the rarely heard "Barnyard Symphony."

Following the memorial concert, which was broadcast live on public television, bass player Mark Shubb came out as a Trans woman, and subsequently performed with the Folksmen in female attire. As she put it:

After that concert I realized I want to spend as much of the rest of my life as possible playing folk music with these gentlemen. And I want to spend all of it as a woman. I came to a realization that I was, and am, a blonde, female folk singer trapped in the body of a bald, male folk singer, and I had to let me out or I would die.

This change had the effect of making the Folksmen lineup identical (at least in terms of gender) to that of Peter, Paul and Mary.

== Discography ==
- A Mighty Wind [original motion picture soundtrack] (DMZ/Columbia/Sony Music Soundtrax 5126562000) 2003

== Concert appearances ==
- Troubadors of Folk festival at Drake Stadium, UCLA, Los Angeles (June 5 & 6, 1993)
- Spinal Tap concert at Grauman's Egyptian Theatre, Los Angeles (September 5, 2000) – opening act
- The Harry Smith Project tribute concert at Royce Hall, UCLA (April 2001) – guest appearance
- Spinal Tap's Back from the Dead tour (June 2001) – opening act for certain performances including Los Angeles (Greek Theatre, June 1), New York City (Carnegie Hall, June 4 and Beacon Theatre, June 23) and San Francisco (Warfield Theater, June 10)
- A Mighty Wind tour (fall 2003) – with Mitch & Mickey and the New Main Street Singers; tour included Philadelphia (Tower Theater, September 19), New York City (The Town Hall, September 20), Washington, D.C. (9:30 Club, September 21), Boston (Orpheum Theatre, September 22), Los Angeles (Wilshire Theatre, November 8), San Francisco (Warfield Theater, November 9), and Seattle (McCaw Hall, November 14).
- Spinal Tap's One-Night-Only World Tour concert at Wembley Arena, London (June 30, 2009) – opening act

== TV appearances ==
- Saturday Night Live (NBC; Nov 3, 1984) – performing "Old Joe's Place"; rehearsal excerpts of "Barnyard Symphony", "Old Ninety-Seven" and "Blood on the Coal"
- A Spinal Tap Reunion – The 25th Anniversary London Sell-Out (NBC special; Dec 31, 1992) - performing "Kumbaya"
- Late Show with David Letterman (CBS; Apr 8, 2003) – performing "Old Joe's Place"
- The View (ABC; Apr 10, 2003) – performing "Never Did No Wanderin"
- MadTV (Fox; Apr 26, 2003) – performing "Blood on the Coal"
- Late Night with Conan O'Brien (NBC; Sep 17, 2003) – performing "Start Me Up"

== Songs ==
Title	Writer/s	A Mighty Wind film	A Mighty Wind CD	Other TV or concert performance
"A Mighty Wind"	Levy/Guest/McKean	Ode to Irving concert	Yes	Unplugged and Unwigged
"Barnyard Symphony"	Guest/McKean/Shearer	Ode to Irving concert	-	SNL (excerpt only)
"Blood on the Coal"	Guest/McKean/Shearer	Rehearsal footage	Yes	SNL (excerpt only); MadTV; Unwigged & Unplugged
"Children of the Sun"	?	Vintage film clip (DVD extra)	-	
"Corn Wine"	Guest/McKean/Shearer	Rehearsal footage (DVD extra)	-	Unwigged & Unplugged
"Kumbaya"	Traditional	-	-	The Return of Spinal Tap
"Loco Man"	Shearer	Rehearsal footage	Yes	Unwigged & Unplugged
"Never Did No Wanderin"	McKean/Shearer	Rehearsal footage	Yes	The View; Unwigged & Unplugged
"Old Joe's Place"	Guest/McKean/Shearer	Ode to Irving; vintage film clip (DVD extra)	Yes	SNL; David Letterman; Unwigged & Unplugged
"Old Ninety-Seven"	?	-	-	SNL (excerpt only)
"Skeletons of Quinto"	Guest	Rehearsal footage	Yes	
"Start Me Up"	Jagger/Richards	-	Yes	Conan O'Brien; Unwigged & Unplugged

The following songs have been mentioned or alluded to in various Folksmen media appearances, but have never been performed:

- "The Frog Prince" - seen as a song title from their album Travelin' on their SNL appearance
- "Miss Purvis (The Girl From The West)" - seen as a song title from their album Travelin' on their SNL appearance
- "Pretty Polly" - seen as a song title from their album Travelin' on their SNL appearance
- "Valencia" - mentioned on their SNL appearance as a "Spanish Civil War song" the group had performed

== See also ==
- Recurring Saturday Night Live characters and sketches
