= Parker Posey =

American actress (born 1968)

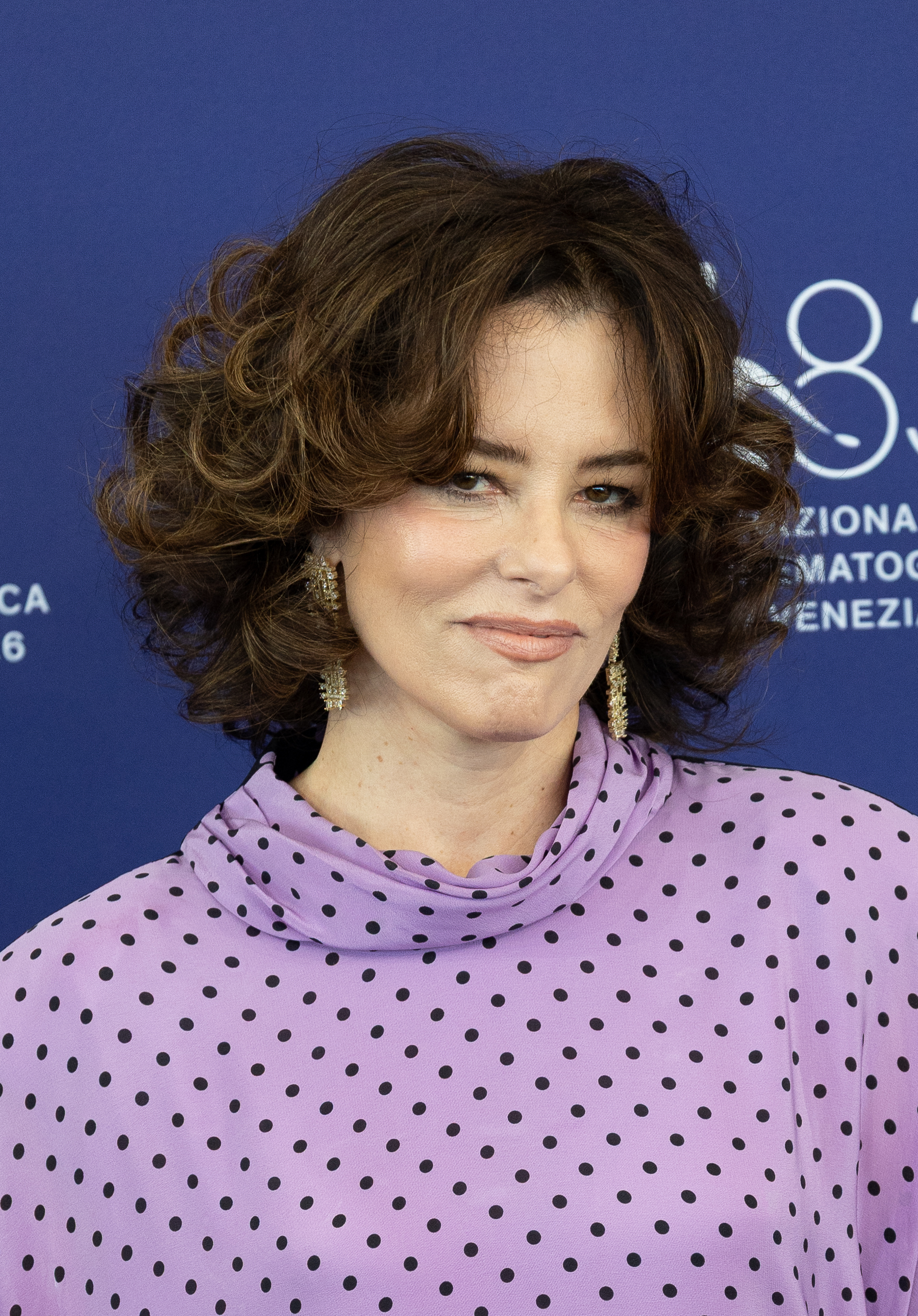
- Posey in 2026
- Born: Parker Christian Posey; November 8, 1968 (age 57); Baltimore, Maryland, U.S.
- Education: State University of New York at Purchase
- Occupation: Actress
- Years active: 1991–present

Parker Christian Posey (born November 8, 1968) is an American actress. Known for playing eccentric characters in independent films, she was named "Queen of the Indies" by Time in 1997 for her work in films such as Dazed and Confused (1993), Party Girl, Kicking and Screaming (both 1995), The Daytrippers (1996), The House of Yes, and Clockwatchers (both 1997).

Further independent film credits include Hal Hartley's trilogy of films, Henry Fool (1998), Fay Grim (2006), and Ned Rifle (2014), Irrational Man (2015), and Columbus (2017). For her performances in Personal Velocity (2002) and Broken English (2007) she received two Independent Spirit Award nominations. You've Got Mail (1998), Scream 3 (2000), Josie and the Pussycats (2001), Blade: Trinity (2004), Superman Returns (2006), Beau Is Afraid (2023), and Wild Horse Nine (2026) are among her studio and blockbuster credits. She has worked with Christopher Guest in his mockumentary films Waiting for Guffman (1996), Best in Show (2000), A Mighty Wind (2003), For Your Consideration (2006), and Mascots (2016).

On television, Posey has starred in the Netflix science fiction series Lost in Space (2018–2021), the HBO Max miniseries The Staircase (2022), and the third season of the HBO anthology series The White Lotus (2025), the latter earning her Primetime Emmy, Golden Globe, and Actor Award nominations. Her book, You're on an Airplane: A Self-Mythologizing Memoir, was published in 2018.

== Early life ==
Posey was born November 8, 1968, in Baltimore, Maryland, to Lynda (née Patton), a chef, and Chris Posey, owner of a car dealership. She was named after model Suzy Parker, and has a twin brother, Christopher. After Posey's birth, her family lived in Monroe, Louisiana, for 11 years. They later moved to Laurel, Mississippi, where her mother worked as a chef and culinary instructor for the Viking Range Corporation in Greenwood and her father operated a car dealership. She was raised Catholic.

Born "into turbulence," Posey described her family as "fabulous Southern characters," saying, "I'm a character actor because I come from a family of characters." As a child, she showcased an inclination for performing, and attended Strong River Camp and Farm in Pinola, Mississippi. She also studied ballet and traveled to the University of North Carolina School of the Arts for training during their summer programs. At 12, she auditioned to attend the school's competitive ballet department but was not accepted. Her father encouraged her to act instead.

== Career ==
=== 1990s ===
Posey attended the State University of New York at Purchase, where she studied drama. While Posey was studying, a talent agent saw her in a play and took her on as a client, sending her out on auditions for independent films and off-off-Broadway plays. Less than three weeks before graduation, she dropped out of school after landing her first break in television with the eight-episode role of Tess Shelby on the daytime soap opera As the World Turns.

Posey's first film appearance were all in 1993: Steve Barron's comedy Coneheads, Steven Starr's romance film Joey Breaker, and Richard Linklater's coming-of-age comedy Dazed and Confused. Her role in Dazed and Confused has been described as probably her most important early performance in reaching a wide audience. In 1994, Posey appeared in Hal Hartley's short film Opera No. 1 and was featured in his crime comedy Amateur. Those parts marked the beginning of a recurrent collaboration between the director and the actress. That year, she appeared in Nora Ephron's black comedy Mixed Nuts, Nigel Dick's thriller Final Combination, and Rory Kelly's dramedy Sleep with Me.

Posey's role as a free-spirited young woman living in New York City in Daisy von Scherler Mayer's Party Girl (1995) proved to be her breakthrough. Budgeted at $150,000, the film was shot in 19 days. It was an arthouse success and the first feature film to premiere on the Internet. Film critic Roger Ebert called it a "showcase leading role for Parker Posey […] who obviously has the stuff, and generates wacky charm." In 1995, Posey played a recovering alcoholic who idolizes Janis Joplin in Peter Cohn's drama Drunks, one half of an estranged couple in Hartley's Flirt, the leading lady's "eternal love slave" in Gregg Araki's The Doom Generation, a serial killer in Todd Verow's Frisk, and a college student in Noah Baumbach's directorial debut Kicking and Screaming.

Posey took on the role of a perky Dairy Queen employee in Christopher Guest's mockumentary Waiting for Guffman (1996), about a community theatre group. Starting with this film, she became a member of a loose repertory group that has appeared in several of Guest's films, in which the actors improvise much of the dialogue and receive the same fee and the same portion of profits. In 1996, Posey played a young woman living in a small town in Richard Linklater's SubUrbia, gallery owner Mary Boone in Julian Schnabel's Basquiat, and an apathetic sister in Greg Mottola's The Daytrippers. Janet Maslin of The New York Times commented that "the main action of The Daytrippers is bright, real and even poignant enough to make this journey worth the ride," and felt that Posey played her character as "the apotheosis of blase cool."

Posey starred alongside Lisa Kudrow, Toni Collette and Alanna Ubach in Clockwatchers (1997), which depicted the lives of four friends working in an office. Dustin Putman of TheFilmFile called it a "jewel of a film" and praised the performances of the cast, describing Posey as "winning and humorous". She received positive reviews for her role as a delusional woman in love with her own brother in The House of Yes (1997). Writing for Entertainment Weekly, Owen Gleiberman asserted that "The House of Yes is knowingly overripe, a kitsch melodrama that dares to make incest sexy," and noted that "Parker Posey may never have a role that suits her as perfectly." For her performance, she was awarded a Special Recognition for Acting Award at Sundance.

Posey was nicknamed "Queen of the Indies" by Time in 1997. She has often considered the title somewhat of a hindrance, and during a 2012 interview with IndieWire, recalled:

I'm trying to work in studio movies, but they won't hire me. I get feedback from my agent saying, "She's too much of an indie queen." And then on the other side, my name doesn't get the financing to do a movie over $1 million. And I'm called "the indie queen". So it's really a challenging path because I know so much about the indie side of the business. Because I grew up in it [...] But it's different times. And this stuff gets projected onto me. People are like, "You're here [at the Sundance film festival] every year, you do so many indie movies." And I'm like, "No, I did Broken English five years ago."

In 1998, Posey appeared as the unemployed sister of a socially inept garbageman in Hartley's Henry Fool, a gold-digging widow in Alastair Reid's What Rats Won't Do, and the title role in Brian Skeet's The Misadventures of Margaret. In her first major studio film credit, Nora Ephron's romantic comedy You've Got Mail (1998), she portrayed an abrasive publisher, alongside Tom Hanks and Meg Ryan. The film received positive reviews and was a commercial success, grossing over $250 million worldwide. She appeared in Robert Dornhelm's The Venice Project (1999) as part of an ensemble cast led by Dennis Hopper and Lauren Bacall.

=== 2000s ===
In Christopher Guest's Best in Show (2000), which revolved around the dog show circuit, Posey starred as a stereotypical yuppie and the owner of a Weimaraner. The film has a 93% approval rating on Rotten Tomatoes, with the website's critical consensus reading, "Best in Show boasts an appealingly quirky premise and a brilliantly talented cast." In Wes Craven's horror sequel Scream 3 (2000), she played an ill-fated actress. Her performance earned her positive reviews and a MTV Movie Award nomination. Scream 3 made $161.8 million globally. She appeared as a villainous record label CEO in Harry Elfont and Deborah Kaplan's musical comedy Josie and the Pussycats (2001) which, despite mixed reviews and lackluster box office returns, later gained a cult following.

In 2001, Posey made her Broadway debut, playing one half a of struggling Manhattan couple, in Elaine May's Taller Than a Dwarf, which was directed by Alan Arkin and ran at the Longacre Theatre. From 2000 to 2001, she provided her voice for episodes of Futurama and The Simpsons, and guest-starred in Will & Grace. She received a Golden Globe Award nomination for Best Supporting Actress – Series, Miniseries or Television Film for playing an ambitious rival in the CBS television film Hell on Heels: The Battle of Mary Kay.

Posey played a "terrified bride" in Roger Kumble's romantic comedy The Sweetest Thing (2002). Roger Ebert was critical of the film but called her "invaluable". She starred with Kyra Sedgwick and Fairuza Balk in Rebecca Miller's drama Personal Velocity: Three Portraits (2002), about three women who escape from their afflicted lives. For her performance, she was nominated for Best Female Lead at the 18th Independent Spirit Awards and was the runner-up for Best Supporting Actress from the New York Film Critics Circle. In 2003, Posey starred as an assistant district attorney in Thom Fitzgerald's drama The Event, and as a former juvenile delinquent and folk band member in Guest's A Mighty Wind, for which she sang and learned to play the mandolin. As a member of the A Mighty Wind cast, she won the Best Cast award from the Florida Film Critics Circle.

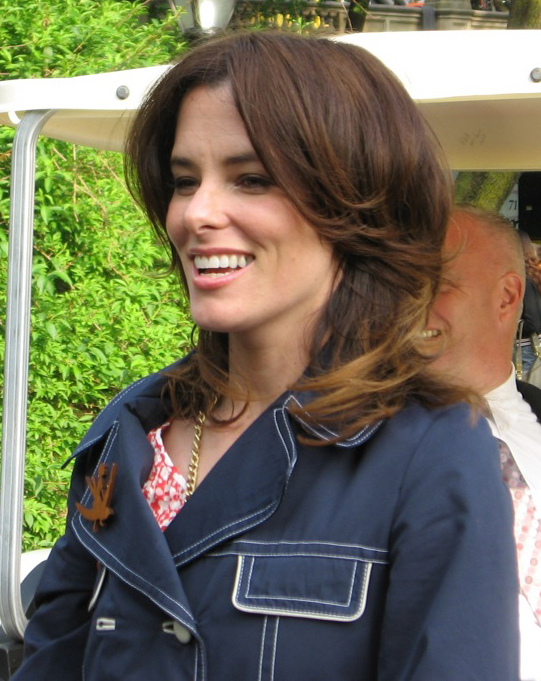
Posey in May 2007

Posey's two screen outings in 2004 —Laws of Attraction and Blade: Trinity— received wide theatrical releases. The courtroom-based romantic comedy Laws of Attraction featured her as a divorcing designer, opposite Pierce Brosnan and Julianne Moore. The film was panned by critics and flopped at the box office. In Blade: Trinity, she played a vampire leader, alongside Wesley Snipes, Ryan Reynolds, and Jessica Biel. Blade made $132 million worldwide despite a negative critical reception. In 2005, she portrayed an "unfunny stand-up comic" and the close friend of a gay man in Craig Chester's comedy Adam & Steve, and acted off-Broadway in David Rabe's Hurlyburly. Chester likened her to Bette Davis, saying, "She's very passionate about her work. She's obsessed with the art of acting. She's disciplined, opinionated, and has high standards."

In 2006, Posey appeared in Superman Returns as Kitty Kowalski, Lex Luthor's ditzy sidekick, a character based on Eve Teschmacher from the 1978 film Superman. She was the only actress considered for the role. Budgeted at over $200 million, Superman Returns was Posey's biggest studio film, and with a worldwide gross of $391.1 million, it proved to be her highest-grossing film to date. Posey was nominated for Best Supporting Actress at the 33rd Saturn Awards. Hartley's Fay Grim (2006) starred Posey as her Henry Fool character as she attempts to unravel an increasingly violent mystery in Europe. Although she had a smaller role in the first film, the director was impressed with her acting and had always intended for the sequel to focus on her character. That year, she starred as a sexually frustrated wife in Billy Kent's comedy The Oh in Ohio and an ingénue in Guest's For Your Consideration. The latter film's cast was honored with Best Ensemble nominations from the Chlotrudis Awards and the Gotham Awards.

Posey starred as a single career woman in Zoe Cassavetes's romantic dramedy Broken English (2007), which screened at the Sundance Film Festival and the 29th Moscow International Film Festival. The film was nominated at the 23rd Independent Spirit Awards for Best First Screenplay and Posey was nominated for Best Female Lead. She signed on for her first regular role on television in The Return of Jezebel James, as a successful children's book editor who, unable to have children herself, asks her estranged younger sister (Lauren Ambrose) to carry her baby. The series was originally given a 13-episode order, but it was cut to seven episodes in anticipation of a pending scriptwriters' strike. It premiered on the Fox television network in 2008 as a mid-season replacement, but was officially canceled after the third episode aired due to low ratings.

In David Moreau and Xavier Palud's The Eye (2008), a remake of the Hong Kong horror film, Posey played the sister of a violinist (Jessica Alba) who receives an eye transplant that allows her to see into the supernatural world. Though not well received by critics, The Eye grossed $58 million worldwide. She starred with Amy Poehler and Rachel Dratch in Ryan Shiraki's Spring Breakdown (2009), a comedy about three long-time friends vacationing together at a popular travel destination for college co-eds. Ray Greene of Boxoffice magazine, after seeing the film at Sundance, gave the film no stars, saying: "The annual Sundance "What the f---" moment has arrived in the form of Spring Breakdown, a very bad genre exercise starring some very good comedic actresses." In Mitchell Lichtenstein's dramedy Happy Tears (2009), Posey portrayed a daughter helping her father with age-related issues. David Fear of Time Out managed to give a film at least one star, writing that "not even the reliable Posey can salvage this slag heap".

=== 2010s ===
Artie Mandelberg's crime film Inside Out (2011), in which Posey starred as the wife of an ex-con, did not connect with critics nor audiences. However, her next film, Michael Walker's comedy Price Check (2012), earned her favorable notices. Justin Lowe of The Hollywood Reporter asserted that Posey "brings a certain gonzo enthusiasm to the office setting, pulling off the role with expert comic timing." From 2011 to 2012, Posey guest-starred in Parks and Recreation, The Big C, The Good Wife, Louie, and New Girl. She received positive reviews for her four-episode stint as Louis C.K.'s love interest in Louie. Lindsay Bahr of Entertainment Weekly said that Posey "used her arsenal of talent and the material written and directed by C.K. to bring Liz to life". Andy Greenwald of GrantLand felt that she was "funny, engaging, and breathless" and went on to call Posey "one of the most gifted actors alive".

In 2012, Posey portrayed Mary Welsh Hemingway, with Nicole Kidman and Clive Owen, in the HBO film Hemingway & Gellhorn, which depicted the relationship between journalist couple Ernest Hemingway and Martha Gellhorn. That year, she originated the role of Pony Jones in Will Eno's The Realistic Joneses, which ran at the Yale Repertory Theater, and was honored with the Excellence in Acting Award at the Provincetown International Film Festival.

In 2013, Posey appeared as the mother of a teenage genius and outcast in Billy Kent's Hair Brained, a mayor in Andrew Meieran's Highland Park, and a hospital volunteer in Zack Bernbaum's And Now a Word from Our Sponsor. The following year, she reunited with Nicole Kidman in Olivier Dahan's biographical film Grace of Monaco, playing the titular character's lady-in-waiting. Opening out of competition at the Cannes Film Festival, the film received largely negative reviews. She appeared in Hartley's Ned Rifle, the third and final film in his Henry Fool trilogy, again reprising her role of Fay Grim. Hartley launched a fundraising campaign through Kickstarter to produce the film, netting a total of $384,000. Posey, along with several other cast members as well as some crew members, appeared in several videos promoting the campaign. The film premiered at the 2014 Toronto International Film Festival and the 65th Berlin International Film Festival.

In Woody Allen's mystery drama Irrational Man (2015), Posey portrayed an unsatisfied chemistry professor, opposite Joaquin Phoenix and Emma Stone. She described her casting as a "relief", explaining that "the independent film way of working is something that was in my bones. It's like being a part of a punk band but no one's singing punk rock anymore. Only a few bands are able to play, and Woody Allen is one of them. That's why I cried." The film was released to mixed reviews at Cannes. David Rooney of The Hollywood Reporter wrote that Posey "plays on her eccentricities as an actor while still keeping them firmly in check, finding both desperation and amusing acerbity" in her role. That year, she had a recurring arc as an eccentric aunt in Granite Flats and guest-starred as Mary Phelps Jacob in Drunk History.

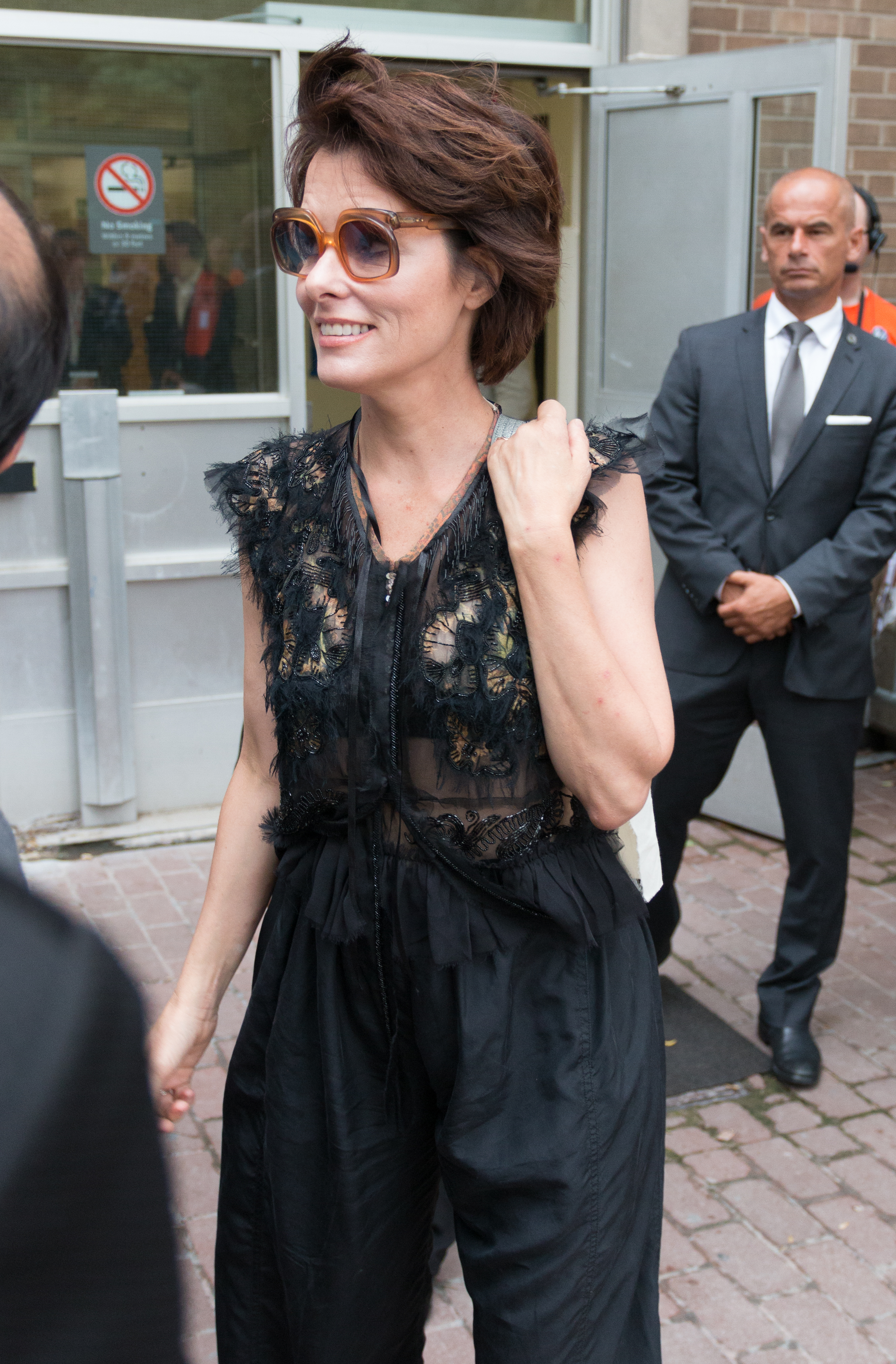
Posey at the premiere of Mascots at the 2016 Toronto International Film Festival

Posey collaborated with Allen again in Café Society (2016), in which she played a "witty and engaging" modeling-agency owner and high-society fixture, alongside Steve Carell, Jesse Eisenberg, and Blake Lively. Critically and commercially, the film fared better than Irrational Man. In 2016, she starred as one half of a couple facing a dream-home-building strife in Jonathan Parker's comedy The Architect, and as an aging dance artist in Guest's Mascots. Her performance in the latter was positively singled out by some critics. Her next film role was that of a renowned scholar's longtime assistant in Kogonada's directorial debut Columbus (2017). She was described as "vibrant" and "excellent" by Geoff Berkshire of Variety and Peter Bradshaw of The Guardian, respectively. She played the "unstable" assistant of a "volatile" filmmaker in James Oakley's caper film The Con Is On (2018), co-starring Uma Thurman, Crispin Glover, and Alice Eve.

Posey's first book, You're on an Airplane: A Self-Mythologizing Memoir (2018), was published by Blue Rider Press. Centered on the idea that the reader is sitting next to Posey on an airplane, the book mixes personal anecdotes from her career, random observations, stories about her life, and homemade photo collages. The book received critical acclaim. According to Elle magazine, it is "a humour-packed, irreverent, eccentric book packed with personal stories, whimsical how-tos and recipes, as well as collages made by her." Esquire wrote: "Posey is a natural storyteller; performing, in any way really, is mostly about sharing stories. And she's gathered some good ones for her memoir, which also perfectly encapsulates the delightful weirdo you assume she is just by watching her play different people on screen."

From 2018 to 2021, Posey appeared as Dr. Smith, a petty criminal, in Lost in Space, the Netflix remake of the 1965 television series. David Griffin of IGN called it "an excellent sci-fi adventure with a slight villain problem", criticizing Posey's role as an unsophisticated and one-dimensional character who lacks redeeming qualities. In contrast, Jen Chaney of Vulture characterized her performance as providing "understated, sly comedic touches", and Beth Elderkin of Gizmodo agreed: "Her performance definitely includes the character's trademark levity and humor." She was nominated for a Saturn Award for Best Supporting Actress in Streaming Presentation. In 2019, she starred as a carpenter's object of affections in Hernán Jiménez's romantic comedy Elsewhere, and headlined the eight-episode audio fiction podcast Hunted, wherein she plays a U.S. Deputy Marshal tracking four escaped convicts from a federal maximum-security correctional facility.

=== 2020s ===
In 2022, Posey portrayed prosecutor Freda Black in the HBO Max miniseries The Staircase. For her role, she studied videos of Black to learn her mannerisms, and spent a significant amount of time speaking to the people who knew her best. She described the part as both a "homecoming" and a "distinct honor", as Black is one of the only real-life people she has portrayed in her work. That year, she guest-starred in Tales of the Walking Dead, an anthology series based on the AMC series The Walking Dead, and the following year, she acted as the ingénue Irene in an extended off-Broadway run of Thomas Bradshaw's adaptation of The Seagull/Woodstock, NY, at the Pershing Square Signature Center.

In Ari Aster's surrealist tragicomedy Beau is Afraid (2023), Posey appeared as the first love of a mild-mannered but paranoia-ridden man, alongside her Irrational Man co-star Joaquin Phoenix. Despite her limited screen time, David Rooney highlighted her "fabulous performance", noting that it was "fearlessly in line with Aster's nightmarish vision". She played the daughter of the titular character in Josh Margolin's Thelma (2024), alongside June Squibb. For her two-episode arc as a spy in Mr. & Mrs. Smith (2024), Posey received a Primetime Emmy Award nomination for Outstanding Guest Actress in a Drama Series.

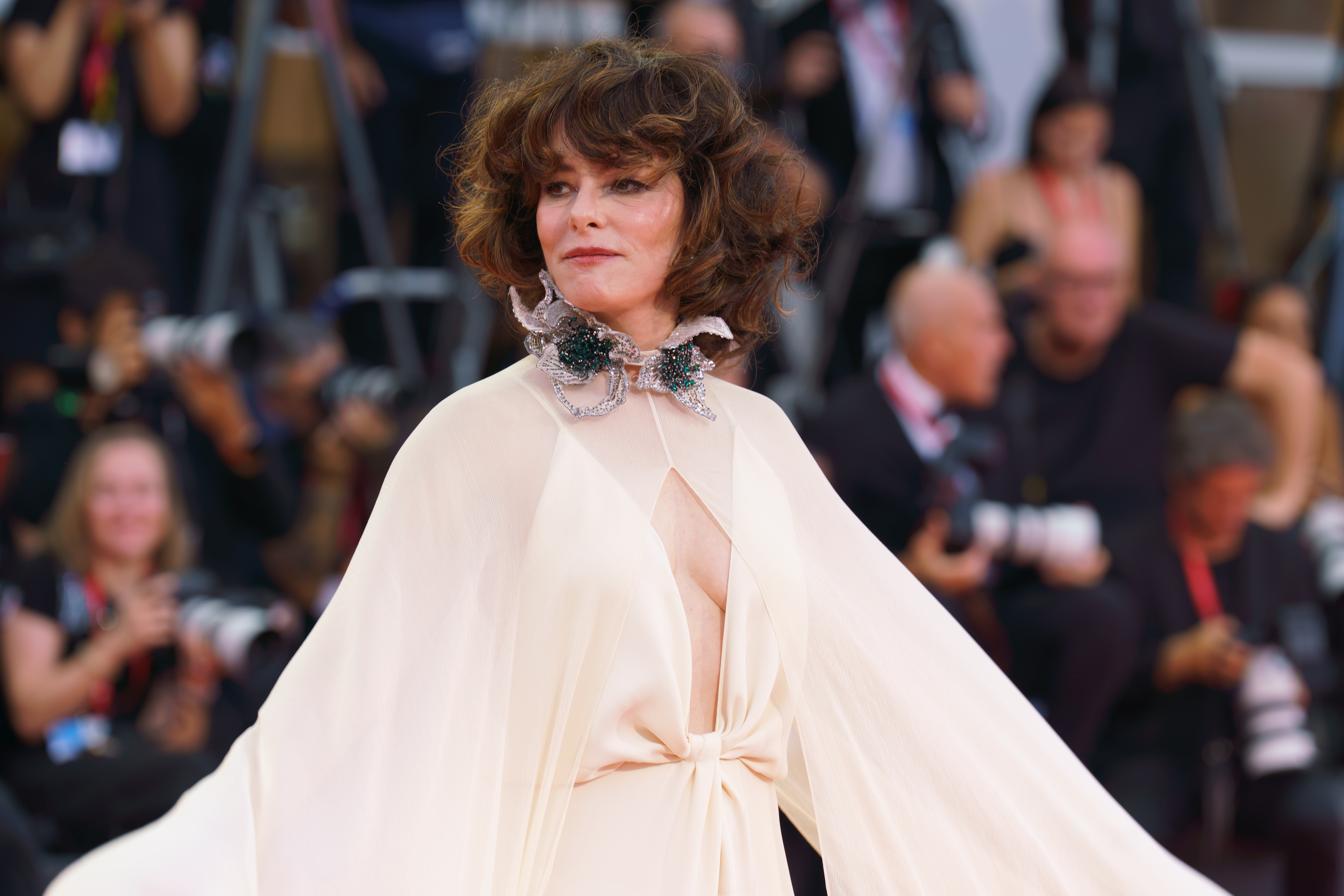
Posey at the 83rd Venice International Film Festival

In 2025, Posey portrayed a wealthy matriarch as part of the main cast of the third season of the HBO anthology series The White Lotus. She spent six months in Thailand, where shooting took place, beginning in February 2024. The series was acclaimed by critics, who largely praised her Southern accent. She starred as an eccentric neighbour in the comedy horror film The Parenting (2025). She is featured in the Hyundai Palisade "All That And More" advertising campaign which debuted on 4 September 2025. Posey stars in Cutwater Spirits' "The Longest Island" Summer 2026 advertising campaign.

== Personal life ==
Posey dated actor Stuart Townsend from 1999 to 2001 after meeting on the set of The Venice Project (1999). She was in a relationship with rock singer Ryan Adams from 2003 to 2005, and provided vocals on several of Adams' records from his album Rock n Roll. From the late 2000s to the early 2010s, she dated visual artist Scott Lenhardt.

Posey has lived in both Greenwich Village and the East Village in New York City. She has taken up pottery and sewing as hobbies, practices Ashtanga yoga, and is a follower of Ayurvedic medicine, which she discovered while filming The Eye (2008) in Albuquerque, New Mexico.

== Filmography ==
=== Film ===
Year	Title	Role	Notes
1993	Coneheads	Stephanie	
1993	Joey Breaker	Irene Kildare	
1993	Description of a Struggle	Wanda	
1993	Dazed and Confused	Darla Marks	
1994	Mixed Nuts	Rollerblader	
1994	Amateur	Girl Squatter	
1994	Final Combination	Denise	
1994	Sleep with Me	Athena	
1995	Party Girl	Mary	
1995	Drunks	Debbie	
1995	Flirt	Emily	
1995	The Doom Generation	Brandi	
1995	Kicking and Screaming	Miami	
1996	Frisk	Fergie	
1996	subUrbia	Erica	
1996	Basquiat	Mary Boone	
1997	The House of Yes	"Jackie-O" Pascal	
1997	The Daytrippers	Jo Malone	
1997	Waiting for Guffman	Libby Mae Brown	
1997	Clockwatchers	Margaret J. Burrell	
1998	Henry Fool	Fay Grim	
1998	What Rats Won't Do	Mirella Burton	
1998	You've Got Mail	Patricia Eden	
1998	The Misadventures of Margaret	Margaret Nathan	
1999	Dinner at Fred's	Celia	
1999	The Venice Project	Myra	
2000	Scream 3	Jennifer Jolie (aka Judy Jurgenstern)	
2000	Best in Show	Meg Swan	
2001	The Anniversary Party	Judy Adams	
2001	Josie and the Pussycats	Fiona	
2002	The Sweetest Thing	Judy Webb	
2002	Personal Velocity	Greta	
2003	A Mighty Wind	Sissy Knox	
2003	The Event	Nick	
2004	Blade: Trinity	Danica Talos	
2004	Laws of Attraction	Serena Jamison	
2005	Adam & Steve	Rhonda	
2006	For Your Consideration	Callie Webb	
2006	Fay Grim	Fay Grim	
2006	The Oh in Ohio	Priscilla Chase	
2006	Superman Returns	Kitty Kowalski	
2007	Broken English	Nora Wilder	
2008	The Eye	Helen Wells	
2009	Spring Breakdown	Becky St. Germaine	Direct-to-DVD
2009	Happy Tears	Jayne	
2011	Inside Out	Claire Small	
2011	The Love Guide	Angelica Lovecraft	
2011	Still Screaming: The Ultimate Scary Movie Retrospective	Herself	Documentary film
2012	Price Check	Susan Felders	
2013	Highland Park	Shirley Paine	
2013	Hair Brained	Shelia Pettifog	
2013	And Now a Word from Our Sponsor	Karen Hillridge	
2014	Grace of Monaco	Madge Tivey-Faucon	
2014	Ned Rifle	Fay Grim	
2015	Irrational Man	Rita Richards	
2016	Café Society	Rad	
2016	The Architect	Drew	
2016	Mascots	Cindi Babineaux	
2017	Columbus	Eleanor	
2018	The Con Is On	Gina	
2019	Elsewhere	Marie	
2023	Beau Is Afraid	Elaine Bray	
2024	Thelma	Gail	
2025	The Parenting	Brenda	
2026	Wild Horse Nine	Marge	

Key
†	Denotes films that have not yet been released

=== Television ===
Year	Film	Role	Notes
1991	First Love, Fatal Love		Television film
1992	As the World Turns	Tess Shelby	8 episodes
1993	Tales of the City	Connie Bradshaw	4 episodes
1993	Tracey Ullman Takes on New York	Libby	TV special
1998	More Tales of the City	Connie Bradshaw	Episode: "1.1"
2000	Futurama	Umbriel	Voice; episode: "The Deep South"
2000	The Simpsons	Becky	Voice; episode: "It's a Mad, Mad, Mad, Mad Marge"
2001	Further Tales of the City	Connie Bradshaw	3 episodes
2001	Will & Grace	Dorleen	2 episodes
2002	Hell on Heels: The Battle of Mary Kay	Jinger Heath	Television film
2004	Frankenstein	Detective Carson O'Conner	Television film
2006	Boston Legal	Marlene Stanger	4 episodes
2008	The Return of Jezebel James	Sarah Tompkins	7 episodes
2009	Bored to Death	Michelle Whiting	Episode: "The Case of the Stolen Skateboard"
2011	Parks and Recreation	Lindsay Carlisle Shay	Episode: "Eagleton"
2011	The Big C	Poppy Kowalski	3 episodes
2011–2012	The Good Wife	Vanessa Gold	3 episodes
2012	Hemingway & Gellhorn	Mary Welsh Hemingway	Television film
2012	Louie	Liz	4 episodes
2012	New Girl	Casey	Episode: "Re-Launch"
2014	Inside Amy Schumer	Parker Posey	Episode: "Allergic to Nuts"
2015	Portlandia	Herself	Episode: "Fashion"
2015	Granite Flats	Alice White	8 episodes
2015	Drunk History	Mary Phelps Jacob	Episode: "Inventors"
2016	Skylanders Academy	Dreamcatcher	Voice; episode: "Dream Girls"
2016	Bream Gives Me Hiccups	Deborah Katzman	Pilot
2016	Search Party	"Brick"	3 episodes
2018–2021	Lost in Space	Dr. Smith / June Harris	28 episodes
2018	Robot Chicken	Lenny Busker / Angela / Sphinx	Voice; episode: "Gimme That Chocolate Milk"
2020	High Fidelity	Noreen Parker	Episode: "Uptown"
2022	The Staircase	Freda Black	6 episodes
2022	Tales of the Walking Dead	Blair Crawford	Episode: "Blair / Gina"
2024	Mr. & Mrs. Smith	Second Other Jane	2 episodes
2024	Moon Girl and Devil Dinosaur	Kat Swan	Voice; episode: "Dog Day Mid-Afternoon"
2025	The White Lotus	Victoria Ratliff	Main role, season 3
2026	The Mob	Host	

Key
†	Denotes series that have not yet been released

=== Stage ===
Year	Play	Role	Theatre
1995	Four Dogs and a Bone	Brenda	Geffen Playhouse, Los Angeles
2000	Taller Than a Dwarf	Selma Miller	Longacre Theatre, Broadway
2003	Fifth of July	Gwen Landis	Peter Norton Space, Off-Broadway
2005	Hurlyburly	Darlene	Acorn Theatre/37 Arts Theatre, Off-Broadway
2012	The Realistic Joneses	Pony Jones	Yale Repertory Theatre, New Haven, Connecticut
2023	The Seagull / Woodstock, NY	Irene	Pershing Square Signature Center, Off-Broadway

== Awards and nominations ==
Year	Award	Category	Work	Result
1997	Sundance Film Festival	Special Jury Recognition	The House of Yes	Won
1997	Satellite Awards	Best Actress – Motion Picture Musical or Comedy	The House of Yes	Nominated
2000	MTV Movie & TV Awards	Best Comedic Performance	Scream 3	Nominated
2002	Golden Globe Awards	Best Supporting Actress – Series, Miniseries or Television Film	Hell on Heels: The Battle of Mary Kay	Nominated
2002	Independent Spirit Awards	Best Lead Female	Personal Velocity	Nominated
2002	New York Film Critics Circle Awards	Best Supporting Actress	Personal Velocity	Runner-up
2003	Florida Film Critics Circle Awards	Best Cast	A Mighty Wind	Won
2003	Phoenix Film Critics Society Awards	Best Cast	A Mighty Wind	Nominated
2006	Gotham Awards	Best Ensemble Cast	For Your Consideration	Nominated
2006	Saturn Awards	Best Supporting Actress	Superman Returns	Nominated
2007	Independent Spirit Awards	Best Lead Female	Broken English	Nominated
2008	Fright Meter Awards	Best Supporting Actress	The Eye	Nominated
2019	Saturn Awards	Best Supporting Actress in Streaming Presentation	Lost in Space	Nominated
2024	Primetime Emmy Awards	Outstanding Guest Actress in a Drama Series	Mr. & Mrs. Smith	Nominated
2025	Primetime Emmy Awards	Outstanding Supporting Actress in a Drama Series	The White Lotus	Nominated
2026	Golden Globe Awards	Best Supporting Actress – Series, Miniseries or Television Film	The White Lotus	Nominated
2026	Actor Awards	Outstanding Performance by a Female Actor in a Drama Series	The White Lotus	Nominated
2026	Actor Awards	Outstanding Performance by an Ensemble in a Drama Series	The White Lotus	Nominated
