= Karen Murphy (producer) =

American film producer

Karen Murphy is an American film producer. She frequently collaborates with writer/director Christopher Guest.

== Films ==
She was a producer in all films unless otherwise noted.

=== Film ===
| Year | Film | Credit |
|---|---|---|
| 1984 | This Is Spinal Tap | |
| 1986 | True Stories | Co-producer |
| 1989 | Drugstore Cowboy | |
| 1992 | The Cutting Edge | |
| 1993 | Twenty Bucks | |
| 1995 | Magic in the Water | Executive producer |
| 1996 | Waiting for Guffman | |
| 2000 | Best in Show | |
| 2003 | A Mighty Wind | |
| 2006 | For Your Consideration | |
| 2016 | Mascots | |

=== Television ===
| Year | Title | Credit | Notes |
|---|---|---|---|
| 1976 | TVTV Looks at the Academy Awards | Production | Television special |
| 1999 | D.O.A. | | Television film |
| 2012 | Playhouse Presents | Executive producer | |
| 2013 | Family Tree | Executive producer | Documentary |
