= Mascots (2016 film) =

American mockumentary comedy film

- Film poster
- Directed by: Christopher Guest
- Written by: Christopher Guest; Jim Piddock
- Produced by: Karen Murphy
- Starring: Jane Lynch; Parker Posey; Christopher Guest; Fred Willard; Ed Begley Jr.; Christopher Moynihan; Don Lake; Zach Woods; Chris O'Dowd; Bob Balaban; Jennifer Coolidge; Michael Hitchcock; John Michael Higgins; Jim Piddock; Maria Blasucci
- Cinematography: Kris Kachikis
- Edited by: Andrew Dickler
- Music by: Jeffrey C.J. Vanston
- Production company: Ra Ra Productions
- Distributed by: Netflix
- Release dates: September 10, 2016 (TIFF); October 13, 2016
- Running time: 89 minutes
- Country: United States
- Language: English

Mascots is a 2016 mockumentary comedy film directed by Christopher Guest, who co-wrote the screenplay with Jim Piddock. The film features an ensemble cast consisting of Jane Lynch, Parker Posey, Fred Willard, Ed Begley Jr., Christopher Moynihan, Don Lake, Zach Woods, Chris O'Dowd, Michael Hitchcock, Bob Balaban, and Jennifer Coolidge.

Guest has a small role as Corky St. Clair, a character he first played in Waiting for Guffman. Posey, Willard, Lake, Balaban, and Hitchcock also appeared in Guffman, but play different roles in this film.

Mascots premiered at the Toronto International Film Festival on September 10, 2016, before being released on Netflix on October 13, 2016.

== Plot ==
Several sports mascots compete for the World Mascot Association championship's Gold Fluffy Award.

== Cast ==
- Jane Lynch as Gabby Monkhouse
- Parker Posey as Cindi Babineaux
- Christopher Guest as Corky St. Clair
- Wayne Wilderson as Dr. Harper James
- Fred Willard as Greg Gammons, Jr.
- Ed Begley Jr. as A.J. Blumquist
- Christopher Moynihan as Phil Mayhew
- Don Lake as Buddy Campbell
- Brad Williams as Ron 'The Worm' Trippman
- Zach Woods as Mike Murray
- Chris O'Dowd as Tommy 'Zook' Zucarello
- Susan Yeagley as Laci Babineaux
- Tom Bennett as Owen Golly, Jr.
- Kerry Godliman as Sarah Golly
- Bob Balaban as Sol Lumpkin
- Jennifer Coolidge as Jolene Lumpkin
- Michael Hitchcock as Langston Aubrey
- Maria Blasucci as Jessica Mundt
- John Michael Higgins as Upton French
- Jim Piddock as Owen Golly Sr.
- Kathreen Khavari as Las Palmas Desk Clerk, Bosphorus Cooper
- Oscar Nunez as Cesar Hidalgo
- Sarah Baker as Mindy Murray
- Harry Shearer as Competition Announcer
- Crafty St. James as Dino, Gabby's Fan

== Production ==
Netflix announced on August 11, 2015 that it would be released on the streaming service in 2016. It was reported on August 26, 2015 that previous Guest collaborators Jane Lynch, Parker Posey, John Michael Higgins, Jennifer Coolidge, Bob Balaban, and Chris O'Dowd were in negotiations to join the film. It screened in the Special Presentations section at the 2016 Toronto International Film Festival.

== Reception ==
On review aggregator Rotten Tomatoes, the film has an approval rating of 48% based on reviews from 48 critics, with an average rating of 5.70/10. On Metacritic, the film has a score of 57 out of 100 based on 16 critics, indicating "mixed or average reviews."

Devan Coggan of Entertainment Weekly wrote: "If you're a Guest devotee, you’ll be in the stands cheering; otherwise, Mascots feels like a bit of a retread." Stephen Dalton of The Hollywood Reporter wrote: "The gentle tone and disjointed sketch-show structure here will appeal to long-standing fans, but Mascots wins no prizes for innovation or progression. The jokes are uneven, the caricatures often overly broad and the plot almost nonexistent."
