= Roberto Schaefer =

American cinematographer

- Born: White Plains, New York, U.S.
- Years active: 1983–present

Roberto Schaefer, ASC, AIC is an American cinematographer.

== Filmography ==
=== Feature film ===
Year	Title	Director
1989	The End of the Night	Davide Ferrario
1991	Le mosche in Testa	Maria Daria Menozzi; Gabriella Morandi
1995	Loungers	Marc Forster; Sebastian Roché
1996	Waiting for Guffman	Christopher Guest
2000	Everything Put Together	Marc Forster
2000	Best in Show	Christopher Guest
2001	Monster's Ball	Marc Forster
2004	Finding Neverland	Marc Forster
2005	Stay	Marc Forster
2005	At Last	Tom Anton
2006	For Your Consideration	Christopher Guest
2006	Stranger than Fiction	Marc Forster
2007	The Kite Runner	Marc Forster
2008	Quantum of Solace	Marc Forster
2009	Leaves of Grass	Tim Blake Nelson
2011	Machine Gun Preacher	Marc Forster
2012	The Paperboy	Lee Daniels
2013	The Host	Andrew Niccol
2015	Miles Ahead (Note: Also credited as producer)	Don Cheadle
2016	Term Life	Peter Billingsley
2017	Geostorm	Dean Devlin
2018	What They Had	Elizabeth Chomko
2019	The Red Sea Diving Resort	Gideon Raff
2019	Rattlesnake	Zak Hilditch
2021	Creation Stories	Nick Moran
2024	The Fabulous Four	Jocelyn Moorhouse
2025	Forelock	Caleb Alexander Smith

=== Television ===
Year	Title	Director	Notes
1992	Red Shoe Diaries	Peter Care; Ted Kotcheff	Episodes "Bounty Hunter" and "Weekend Pass"
2002	Robbery Homicide Division	Stephen Gyllenhaal	Episode "A Life of Its Own"
2013	Family Tree	Christopher Guest	8 episodes
2022	The Peripheral	Alrick Riley	4 episodes

TV movies

Year	Title	Director	Notes
1984	Finalmente Morta	Elisabetta Valgiusti	
1994	Roadracers	Robert Rodriguez	Part of the Rebel Highway series
1994	Cool and the Crazy	Ralph Bakshi	Part of the Rebel Highway series
1999	D.O.A.	Christopher Guest	
2007	The Thick of It	Christopher Guest	
2011	Hallelujah	Michael Apted	
2019	Less Than Zero	Craig Wright	

== Awards and nominations ==
Year	Award	Category	Title	Result	Ref.
1994	CableACE Award	Direction of Photography	Roadracers	Nominated	
2004	BAFTA Awards	Best Cinematography	Finding Neverland	Nominated	
2007	St. Louis Film Critics Association	Best Cinematography	The Kite Runner	Nominated	
2013	Camerimage	Cinematographer/Director Duo (Shared with Marc Forster)		Won	
