= Michael Hitchcock =

American actor and producer

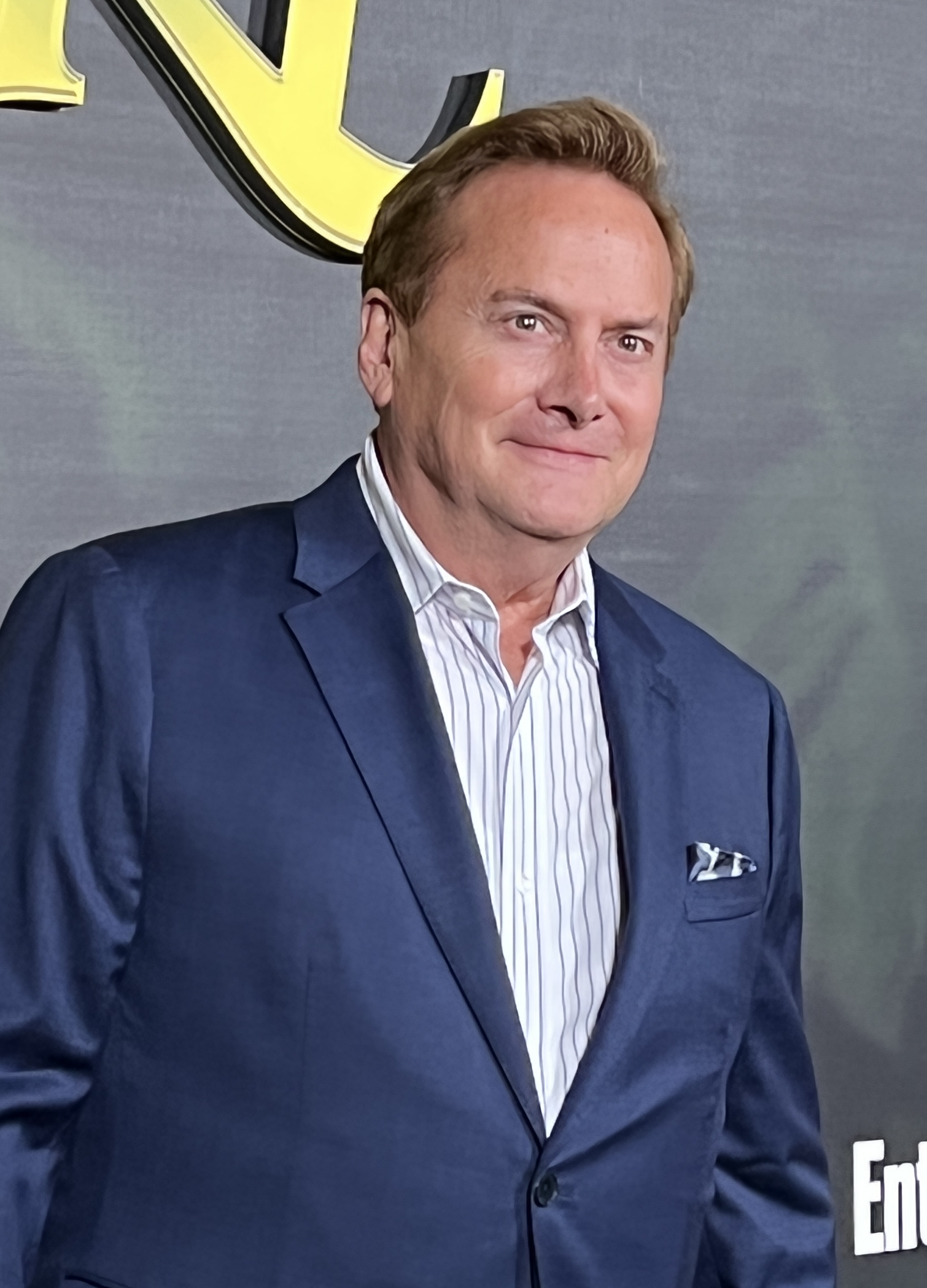
- Hitchcock in 2023
- Education: Northwestern University (BS); University of California, Los Angeles (MFA)
- Occupations: Actor; comedian; screenwriter; television producer
- Years active: 1992–present

Michael Hitchcock is an American actor, comedian, screenwriter, and television producer.

== Early life ==
Hitchcock received his Bachelor of Science degree from Northwestern University and a Master of Fine Arts degree from the University of California, Los Angeles. He is a graduate of Lyons Township High School in LaGrange, Illinois.

== Career ==
Hitchcock is an alumnus of the Groundlings, a Los Angeles–based improvisational and sketch comedy theater troupe. Although he retired from the theatre's Main Stage Company in the mid-1990s, Hitchcock still comes back regularly to perform in the Groundlings' all-improv shows Cookin' with Gas and The Crazy Uncle Joe Show.

In 1999, Hitchcock became a writer for the FOX late-night comedy series MADtv, and became one of the series' producers in 2001. He also played the role of Simeon Dyson, an obnoxious, drug-abusing game show announcer on the recurring MADtv sketch, "The Lillian Verner Game Show." During his tenure, the MADtv writing team was nominated for three Writers Guild of America Awards in the Comedy/Variety category (in 2003, 2004, and 2005).

Hitchcock's other writing credits include the comedy films House Arrest (1996), and The Ultimate Christmas Present (2000) as well as the critically acclaimed drama Where the Day Takes You (1992), which marked the film acting debut of Will Smith and also featured Dermot Mulroney, Lara Flynn Boyle, Sean Astin, Balthazar Getty, and Christian Slater. Where the Day Takes You was nominated for the "Critics Award" at the Deauville Film Festival, and Mulroney won "Best Actor" at the Seattle International Film Festival.

As an actor, Hitchcock has appeared in several of Christopher Guest's critically acclaimed movies, including Waiting for Guffman (1996), Best in Show (2000), A Mighty Wind (2003), For Your Consideration (2006), and Mascots (2016). Hitchcock and his co-actors from A Mighty Wind were awarded "Best Ensemble Cast" by Florida Film Critics Circle and were nominated for "Best Ensemble Acting" by the Phoenix Film Critics Society. In June 2025, The New York Times named Best in Show as one of the "Best 100 Movies of the 21st Century."

Hitchcock served as a writer and co-executive producer on seasons 5 and 6 of the FOX television series Glee. Hitchcock served as a writer and supervising producer on season 4, and became a writer and consulting producer for season 3 of the show after previously appearing in a guest role in season 1 as rival glee club director Dalton Rumba. Hitchcock reprised this role in the season 4 episode "Makeover", season 5 episode "Love Love Love" and season 6 episode "The Hurt Locker, Part Two". In addition, Hitchcock directed the season 6 episode "Child Star".

Hitchcock was a writer and executive producer on seasons 3 and 4 of the CW television series Crazy Ex-Girlfriend. He also served as a writer and co-executive producer on seasons 1 and 2. In addition, he has played the role of water conspiracy theorist Bert.

Hitchcock currently recurs on Sterlin Harjo's series The Lowdown as Ray, an antique dealer in Tulsa, Oklahoma, who helps Ethan Hawke's character Lee Raybon expose perceived local corruption. He also recurs on Nobody Wants This as Henry, a newly out of the closet father to the characters of Kristen Bell and Justine Lupe.

== Filmography ==
Key
†	Denotes works that have not yet been released

=== Film ===
Year	Title	Role	Notes
1988	Sleepaway Camp II: Unhappy Campers	Counselor	Uncredited; also writer (as Felix Gordon)
1993	The Making of '...And God Spoke'	Bob A.D.	
1996	House Arrest	Cop	
1996	Waiting for Guffman	Steve Stark	
1996	Shooting Lily	Mark	
1999	Can't Stop Dancing	Eddie	
1999	Dill Scallion	Rusty Bob	
1999	Thick as Thieves	Maloney	
1999	Happy, Texas	Steven	
2000	Best in Show	Hamilton Swan	
2001	Heartbreakers	Dr. Arnold Davis	
2002	Life Without Dick	Religious Guy	
2002	Bug	Craig Johnston	
2002	The Badge	Luna	
2003	Sol Goode	Job Placement Officer	
2003	A Mighty Wind	Lawrence E. Turpin	
2003	Soul Mates	Doctor 1	Short
2005	Pretty Persuasion	Headmaster Charles Meyer	
2005	Greener Mountains	Randall	
2005	Serenity	Dr. Mathias	
2006	Danny Roane: First Time Director	John Imbagliado	
2006	For Your Consideration	"Hate It" critic David van Zyverdan	
2006	Let's Go to Prison	Wine Taster	
2007	Smiley Face	Laundry Room Man	
2007	Wild Hogs	Kent	
2007	The Captain	Tad	Short
2008	Other Plans	Douglas	Short
2008	Just Add Water	Mark Tuckby	
2008	Private Valentine: Blonde & Dangerous	Nigel Crew	
2009	Poolside	Mr. Vanguard	Short
2010	Tight		Short produced by Funny or Die
2010	Operation: Endgame	Neil	
2010	Pete Smalls Is Dead	Sly	
2011	For Christ's Sake	Tom	
2011	Bridesmaids	Don Cholodecki	
2011	Super 8	Deputy Rosko	
2015	Addicted to Fresno	David	
2015	Your Hands	Charlie	Short
2016	Mascots	Langston Aubrey	
2020	Magic Camp	Kornelius Kessler	
2021	Barb and Star Go to Vista Del Mar	Gary	
2022	The Dinner Party	Joe	Short
2023	Your Place or Mine	Alex	
2023	Puppy Love	Dr. Hert	
2023	EXmas	Dennis Stoop	
2024	Jackpot!	Sleazy Ron Wexler	
2024	Reunion	Mr. Theodore Buckley	
2025	The Long-Reigning King of Rollercastle Skateland	Stuart	Short
2026	I Want Your Sex	Bruce	

=== Television ===
Year	Title	Role	Notes
1998–1999	Unhappily Ever After	Coach McNiff	Season 5, Episodes 3, 8, 21
1999	NYPD Blue	Eric Horstead	Season 6 Episode 12 "What's Up, Chuck?"
2000–2001	Grosse Pointe	Richard Towers	Recurring (7 episodes)
2001–2007	Mad TV	Various	12 episodes; also writer and producer
2003	On the Spot	The Professor	5 episodes
2004	Arrested Development	Ira Gilligan	Season 1, Episode 19 "Best Man for the Gob"
2004	Pilot Season	Karen's Roommate	TV miniseries
2004	Las Vegas	Gerhardt	Season 2, Episode 3 "Blood Is Thicker"
2005	Desperate Housewives	Mr. Doyle	Season 2, Episode 4 "My Heart Belongs to Daddy"
2005	The Bernie Mac Show	Father Roger	Season 5, Episode 10 "Some Church Bull"
2006	The Danny Comden Project	Mike	TV movie
2006	Tom Goes to the Mayor	Durango Bolo Salesman (voice)	Season 2, Episode 4 "White Collarless"
2006	Lovespring International	Randall Hitchings	Episode 10 "Homeless Rockstar"
2007	Entourage	Paul Schneider	Season 3, Episode 18 "The Resurrection"
2007	Case Closed	Ernie	TV movie
2007–2009	Head Case	Myron's Patients/Arthur Graham	2 episodes
2008	Pushing Daisies	Father Eduardo Dedonde	Season 2, Episode 3 "Bad Habits"
2008	Young Person's Guide to History	General George Washington	Produced by Adult Swim
2009	Big Red	Doug George	TV movie
2009–2010	The Suite Life on Deck	Mr. Blanket	3 episodes
2009–2011	Men of a Certain Age	Dave	Recurring
2009–2015	Glee	Dalton Rumba	5 episodes; also writer and co-executive producer
2010	Party Down	Bolus Lugozshe	Season 2; episodes "Party Down Company Picnic" and "Constance Carmell Wedding"
2010	The League	Ed	Season 2, Episode 8 "The Tie"
2010–2011	United States of Tara	Ted Mayo	Recurring, seasons 2–3
2011	Curb Your Enthusiasm	Vance	Season 8 Episode 5 "Vow of Silence"
2011	Up All Night	Mr. Bob	Season 1 Episode 5 "Mr. Bob's Toddler Kaleidoscope"
2011	Easy to Assemble	M.C.	Season 3
2012	The New Normal	Gary	Recurring
2015	Hot Girl Walks By	Keith Wayne	Episode 6 "Zombie Apocalypse"
2015–2019	Crazy Ex-Girlfriend	Bert Buttenweiser	11 episodes; also writer and executive producer
2016	Idiotsitter	Dan	Season 2, Episode 6 "Mother's Day"
2017	People of Earth	Leonard Bechdal	Season 2, Episode 8 "Alien Experiencer Expo"
2017	Veep	Greg Morehouse	Season 6, Episode 7 "Blurb"
2017	Nobodies	Howard	Season 1, Episode 4 "Call My Agent"
2018	Teachers	Lonny	Season 3, Episode 4 "Leggo My Preggo"
2018	Trial & Error	Jesse Ray Beaumont	Recurring, season 2
2018	Fortune Rookie	Badger	Web series, Episode 7 "Hot Basics"
2020	Space Force	Jerome Lalosz	Season 1, Episode 4 "Lunar Habitat"
2020	The Goldbergs	Lon MacDowell	Season 7, Episode 19 "Island Time"
2020–2021	Bless the Harts	Mr. Bigsby (voice)	Season 2, Episodes 8 and 19
2020–2021	Black Monday	Pastor Newell	Recurring, seasons 2–3
2021	Diary of a Future President	Thomas	Season 2, Episode 9 "First Gentleman"
2022	The Woman in the House Across the Street from the Girl in the Window	Paul M. Riordan	2 episodes
2022	The Resort	Ted	2 episodes
2022	A League of Their Own	Tom	Episode 1 "Batter Up"
2023	Family Guy	(voice)	Season 22, Episode 8 "Breaking Sad"
2024	Nobody Wants This	Henry	4 episodes
2024	Palm Royale	Chester	Episode: "Maxine Saves the Whale"
2024	It's Florida, Man	Bail Bondsman Tim	Episode: "Mugshot"
2025	The Paper	Mr. K	Episode: "TTT vs the Blogger"
2025–26	The Lowdown	Ray Moseley	Season 1: 4 episodes; Season 2
