= Waiting for Guffman =

1996 mockumentary comedy film by Christopher Guest

- Theatrical release poster
- Directed by: Christopher Guest
- Written by: Christopher Guest; Eugene Levy
- Produced by: Karen Murphy
- Starring: Lewis Arquette; Bob Balaban; Christopher Guest; Matt Keeslar; Eugene Levy; Catherine O'Hara; Parker Posey; Fred Willard
- Cinematography: Roberto Schaefer
- Edited by: Andy Blumenthal
- Music by: Christopher Guest; Michael McKean; Harry Shearer
- Production company: Castle Rock Entertainment
- Distributed by: Sony Pictures Classics
- Release dates: August 21, 1996 (Boston Film Festival); January 31, 1997 (Wide)
- Running time: 84 minutes
- Country: United States
- Language: English
- Budget: $4 million
- Box office: $2.9 million (US)

Waiting for Guffman is a 1996 American mockumentary comedy film written by Christopher Guest and Eugene Levy, and directed by Guest. The film's ensemble cast includes Guest, Levy, Catherine O'Hara, Fred Willard, Bob Balaban, and Parker Posey.

While alluding to Samuel Beckett's play Waiting for Godot, the story follows a local community production of a stage musical, with original songs written by Guest, Michael McKean, and Harry Shearer. As with other Guest mockumentary films, most of the dialogue was improvised.

Waiting for Guffman premiered at the Boston Film Festival on August 21, 1996 before receiving a wide release by Sony Pictures Classics on January 31, 1997. The film received positive reviews from critics and was a box office bomb, grossing $2.9 million against a $4 million budget.

== Plot ==
In the small city of Blaine, Missouri, a few residents prepare to put on a community theater production led by eccentric director Corky St. Clair. The show, a musical chronicling the town's history titled Red, White and Blaine, is to be performed as part of the town's 150th-anniversary celebration.

Cast in the leads are Ron and Sheila Albertson, married travel agents who are also regular amateur performers; Libby Mae Brown, a perky Dairy Queen employee; Clifford Wooley, a "long time Blaineian" and retired taxidermist, who is Red, White and Blaine's narrator; Johnny Savage, a handsome and oblivious mechanic, whom Corky goes out of his way to get into the play; and Dr. Allan Pearl, a tragically square dentist determined to discover his inner entertainer. High-school teacher Lloyd Miller is the show's increasingly frustrated musical director.

Corky has used connections from his "off-off-off-off-Broadway" past to invite Mort Guffman, a Broadway producer, to critique Red, White and Blaine. Corky leads the cast to believe that a positive review from Guffman could mean their show might go all the way to Broadway.

The program itself is designed to musically retell the history of Blaine, whose founding father was a buffoon incapable of distinguishing the geography of middle Missouri from the Pacific coastline. The viewer also learns why the town obtusely refers to itself as "the stool capital of the United States." The music is a series of poorly performed songs such as "Nothing Ever Happens on Mars", a reference to the town's supposed visit by an unidentified flying object, and "Stool Boom".

Central to the film are Corky's stereotypically gay mannerisms. He supposedly has a wife called Bonnie, whom no one in Blaine has ever met or seen. He uses her to explain his habit of shopping for women's clothing and shoes.

When Johnny is forced by his suspicious father to quit the show, Corky takes over his roles, which were clearly intended for a young, masculine actor, playing a lusty young frontiersman, a heartbroken soldier, and a little boy wearing a beanie and shorts. Corky never sheds his dainty demeanor, bowl haircut, lisp, or earring in spite of his historical roles, and his face is pasted with an overkill of stage rouge and eyeliner.

Corky is also faced with creating his magic on a shoestring budget, at one point quitting the show after storming out of a meeting with the city council, which turns down his request for $100,000 to finance the production, but the distraught cast and persuasive city fathers convince Corky to return. At the show's performance, Guffman's seat is seen to be empty, much to the dismay of the cast. Corky reassures them that Broadway producers always arrive a bit late for the show, and sure enough, a man soon takes Guffman's reserved seat. The show is well received by the audience, whereupon Corky invites the assumed Guffman backstage to talk to the actors.

The man is actually Roy Loomis, who has come to Blaine to witness the birth of his niece's baby, but he did enjoy the show. Corky then reads a telegram stating that Guffman's plane was grounded by snowstorms in New York City, meaning that, like the "Godot" being spoofed, the real Guffman never arrives.

An epilogue shows the fates of the cast: Libby Mae is now living in Sipes, Alabama, where she moved after her father was paroled, and working at the Dairy Queen. Allan and the Albertsons have pursued their dreams of being entertainers, Ron and Sheila traveling to Los Angeles, California, to work as extras, and Allan now performing for elderly Jews in Miami, Florida retirement communities. Corky has returned to New York City, where he has opened a Hollywood-themed novelty shop, which includes such items as Brat Pack bobblehead dolls, My Dinner with Andre action figures, and The Remains of the Day lunch boxes.

== Cast ==
- Christopher Guest as Corky St. Clair
- Eugene Levy as Dr. Allan Pearl
- Fred Willard as Ron Albertson
- Catherine O'Hara as Sheila Albertson
- Parker Posey as Libby Mae Brown
- Lewis Arquette as Clifford Wooley
- Bob Balaban as Lloyd Miller
- Matt Keeslar as Johnny Savage
- Brian Doyle-Murray as "Red" Savage
- Michael Hitchcock as Steve Stark
- Larry Miller as Mayor Glenn Welsch
- Don Lake as Phil Burgess
- Scott Williamson as Tucker Livingson
- Deborah Theaker as Gwen Fabin-Blunt
- David Cross as UFO Expert
- Linda Kash as Mrs. Pearl
- Paul Benedict as Roy Loomis (credited as "Not Guffman")
- Paul Dooley as UFO Abductee
- Bob Odenkirk as an auditionee

== Production ==
The movie was shot in Lockhart, Texas, a town located 30 miles south of Austin. Christopher Guest wanted to put a "Stool capital of the world" sign up over the town, but he was not granted permission to do so. Additional shooting took place in Los Angeles, including the scenes set in Corky St. Clair's apartment.

As in the other mockumentary films created by Guest, the majority of the dialogue is improvised. Matt Keeslar was the only cast member with no history of doing improvisational acting. Guest compares the process to jazz music: "You know the basic melody and the key changes, but it's how you get from one change to the next that matters, and you don't know in advance how you're going to do it. I'm completely blank before the camera rolls. I have absolutely no idea what I'm going to say." Guest shoots 10-minute-long scenes and allows improvisations to unfold organically. He ends up with almost 60 hours of film, and takes over a year to edit it down to about 90 minutes. A two-hour workprint version of Waiting for Guffman has circulated among fans, which includes some of the original footage that was edited out.

== Release and reception ==
After being shown at the Toronto and Boston film festivals in late 1996, it received a US theatrical release, playing in roughly 50 theaters beginning on January 31, 1997. The only other country it received a theatrical release in was Australia, during September 1997. It had earlier been shown at the Melbourne International Film Festival on August 4, 1997. The film's theatrical distribution was handled by Sony Pictures Classics, an independent film division of Sony Pictures Entertainment. However, the film's rights have remained with Warner Bros., as it was produced by their subdivision Castle Rock Entertainment. Another Parker Posey film from this period titled Suburbia had the same rights circumstances as Waiting for Guffman, as it was produced and owned by Warner Bros. but distributed to theaters in February 1997 by Sony Pictures Classics. Starting with 2000's Best In Show, Christopher Guest's subsequent mockumentaries were handled entirely by Warner, with no involvement from Sony Pictures Classics.

To promote the film, Guest made appearances on Late Night with Conan O'Brien and the NBC talk show Later during February 1997.

As of 2026, Waiting for Guffman has a 91% approval rating on Rotten Tomatoes based on 114 reviews. The site's critical consensus reads, "This riotously deadpan mockumentary about aspiring community theater performers never stoops to ridicule oft-ridiculous characters." The film also received a score of 71 out of 100 on Metacritic, based on 19 critics, indicating "generally favorable reviews".

Owen Gleiberman of Entertainment Weekly gave the film a grade A and called it "A madcap gem." Peter Travers of Rolling Stone called it "Priceless". It got two thumbs up on the February 1, 1997, episode of Siskel and Ebert. In his review for the Chicago Sun-Times, Roger Ebert gave the film three out of four stars and wrote: "Attention is paid not simply to funny characters and punch lines, but to small nudges at human nature." Maitland McDonagh of TV Guide called the film "Frequently funny -- sometimes very funny indeed."

During opening weekend, the film made $37,990. The film earned $2.9 million at the US domestic box office, against a production budget of $4 million.

== Accolades and legacy ==
In December 2022, Variety listed Waiting for Guffman as one of "The 100 Best Movies of All Time", saying it was "a comedy as touching as it is hilarious" and "one for the ages" that became "the ultimate cult film for a newly liberated generation".

Shortly after its release, in January 1998, SFGate listed it as one of the best films of the previous year, according to ratings by 40 major critics, including those of The New York Times, the San Francisco Chronicle, and the Los Angeles Times. The Lone Star Film & Television Awards awarded Waiting for Guffman Best Film and Best Director.

American Film Institute recognition:

- AFI's 100 Years... 100 Laughs – Nominated

Independent Spirit Awards recognition:

- Best Feature - Karen Murphy (nominated)
- Best Male Lead - Christopher Guest (nominated)
- Best Screenplay - Christopher Guest, Eugene Levy (nominated)

Actress Jane Lynch has stated her admiration of Waiting for Guffman is what made her want to work with Guest on Best in Show.

== Home media ==
In the US, it was released on VHS by Warner Bros. in August 1997, and then on DVD in August 2001. In 2017, it was re-released on Blu-ray.
