= Michael McKean =

American actor (born 1947)

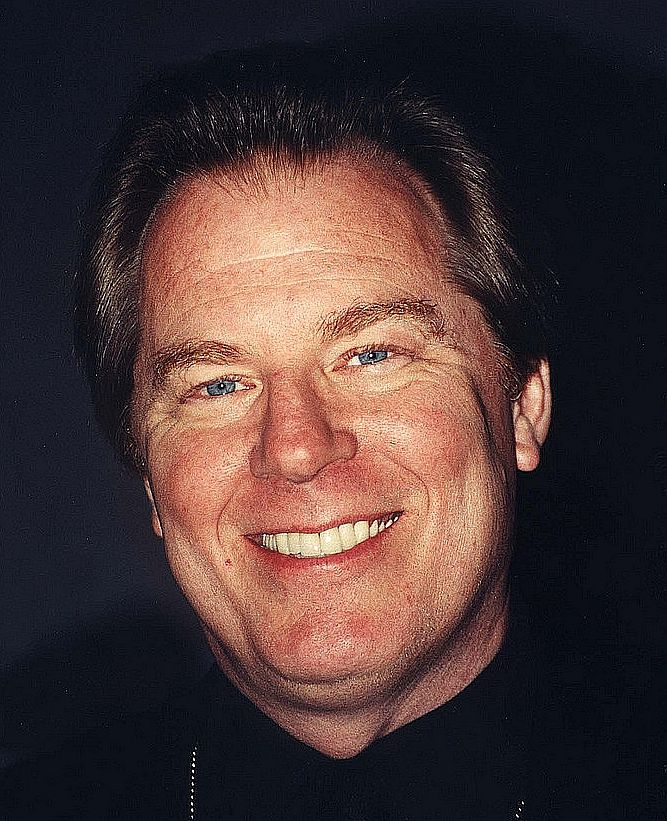
- McKean in 1999
- Born: Michael John McKean; October 17, 1947 (age 79); New York City, U.S.
- Education: Carnegie Mellon University (BFA); New York University (MFA)
- Occupations: Actor; comedian; screenwriter; director; composer; musician
- Years active: 1967–present
- Spouses: Susan Russell (m. 1970; div. 1993); Annette O'Toole (m. 1999)
- Children: 2
- Website: michaelmckean.com

Michael John McKean (/məˈkiːən/ mə-KEE-ən; born October 17, 1947) is an American actor, comedian, screenwriter, composer, and musician. Born in New York City, McKean started his career as Lenny Kosnowski in the ABC sitcom Laverne & Shirley from 1976 to 1983. He was briefly a cast member on the NBC sketch comedy series Saturday Night Live for its 19th and 20th seasons from 1994 to 1995, and played Gibby Fiske in HBO series Dream On (1990–96). He has acted in films such as Used Cars (1980), Clue (1985), and The Big Picture (1989), the last of which he also co-wrote.

McKean is also known for having collaborated with Christopher Guest acting in his films such as This Is Spinal Tap (1984), Best in Show (2000), A Mighty Wind (2003), and For Your Consideration (2006). He co-wrote the song "A Mighty Wind" (for A Mighty Wind), for which he won a Grammy Award. Along with his wife, Annette O’Toole, McKean also co-wrote "A Kiss at the End of the Rainbow" from the same film, which was nominated for an Academy Award. He was nominated for a Primetime Emmy Award in 2019 for his role as Chuck McGill on the AMC series Better Call Saul (2015–18; 2022). Since 2020, he has voiced Lou Pickles in Nickelodeon's Rugrats franchise. He has acted in shows such as Curb Your Enthusiasm, Veep, Grace and Frankie, Breeders, and The Diplomat.

On stage, McKean made his Broadway debut as Edna Turnblad in the musical Hairspray (2004). He took on dual roles portraying J. Edgar Hoover and Robert Byrd in the political epic play All the Way (2014). He has acted in Broadway plays such as the Tracy Letts play Superior Donuts (2009), the Gore Vidal revival The Best Man (2012), and the Lillian Hellman revival The Little Foxes (2017). McKean is the twenty-third highest-earning game show contestant of all time, having accumulated $1,115,400 during his appearances on Celebrity Jeopardy!.

== Early life ==
Michael John McKean was born October 17, 1947, in New York City at Manhattan Women's Hospital. He is the son of Gilbert S. McKean, one of the founders of Decca Records, and Ruth Stewart McKean, a librarian, and was raised in Sea Cliff, New York, on Long Island. He graduated from North Shore High School in 1965. In early 1967, he was briefly a member of the New York City "baroque pop" band the Left Banke and played on the "Ivy, Ivy" single (B-side: "And Suddenly").

== Career ==
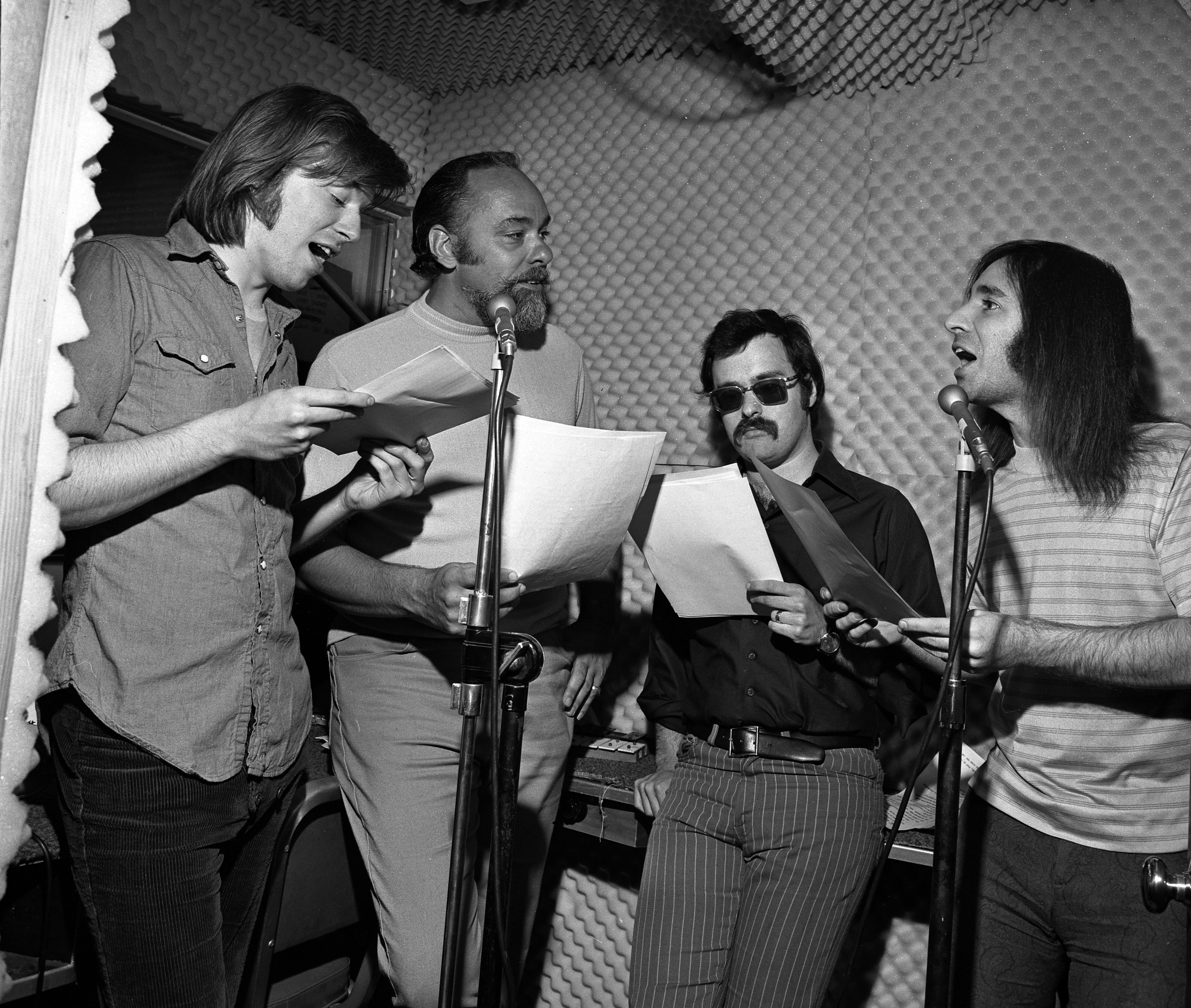
McKean (furthest left) as a member of The Credibility Gap with Richard Beebe, David L. Lander, and Harry Shearer, 1970

McKean began his career (as well as the characters of Lenny and Squiggy) in Pittsburgh while a student at Carnegie Mellon; David Lander was a fellow student at CMU. Their partnership grew after graduation as part of the comedy group The Credibility Gap with Harry Shearer in Los Angeles, but McKean's breakthrough came in 1976 when he and Lander joined the cast of Laverne & Shirley portraying Lenny and Squiggy. McKean directed one episode, and the characters became something of a phenomenon, even releasing an album as Lenny and the Squigtones in 1979, which featured a young Christopher Guest on guitar (credited as Nigel Tufnel, the name Guest also used that year in his first appearance as part of the spoof rock band Spinal Tap). "Foreign Legion of Love" was a big hit for the Squigtones, with frequent play on the Dr. Demento Show. McKean also played his character in an episode of Happy Days. After leaving Laverne & Shirley in 1982, McKean appeared in the film spoof Young Doctors in Love, then two years later as David St. Hubbins in the comedy This Is Spinal Tap with both Guest and Shearer.

McKean quickly became a recognizable name in film and television, with appearances in movies such as Used Cars (1980), Clue (1985), D.A.R.Y.L. (1985), Planes, Trains and Automobiles (1987), Earth Girls Are Easy (1988), and taking a lead role in Short Circuit 2 (1988). He appeared opposite Kiefer Sutherland and Dennis Hopper in Flashback (1990). The same year, McKean was part of an ensemble cast in the television series Grand, which aired for a short time. In 1991, McKean co-wrote (with Christopher Guest) the second episode and later directed the final episode of the mock documentary series Morton & Hayes, created by Phil Mishkin and Rob Reiner. McKean appeared in a number of film roles, including the film adaptation of Memoirs of an Invisible Man (1992), Coneheads (1993), Airheads (1994), and Radioland Murders (1994).

After he appeared on Saturday Night Live as a musical guest and later as a guest host, McKean joined the cast from 1994 to 1995. At age 46, he was the oldest person ever to join the SNL cast at the time (later surpassed by Leslie Jones, who joined in 2014 at age 47), one of a handful of SNL cast members who weren't already hired to work behind the scenes (like SNL's numerous writers-turned-cast members) to appear on the show before becoming a cast member and the only one to be a musical guest and a host before becoming a cast member. During this time, he also released a video follow-up to Spinal Tap, played the villainous Mr. Dittmeyer in The Brady Bunch Movie, and played the boss Gibby in the series Dream On. After leaving Saturday Night Live, McKean spent a lot of time doing children's fare, voicing various TV shows and films. In 1997, he performed the lead voice role in the video game Zork Grand Inquisitor as Dalboz of Gurth and appeared in the 1999 films Teaching Mrs. Tingle and Mystery, Alaska.

McKean's television guest appearances include The Simpsons; Star Trek: Voyager; Boy Meets World; Murder, She Wrote; Murphy Brown; Lois and Clark: The New Adventures of Superman; Friends; and Caroline in the City. McKean had a recurring role on the HBO sketch comedy series, Tracey Takes On..., which he also directed. In 1998, he guest starred in a two-part episode of The X-Files titled "Dreamland," in which his character Morris Fletcher switched bodies with Fox Mulder. The character was a success, reappearing in 1999's "Three of a Kind," an episode which focused on the recurring characters of The Lone Gunmen. The character appeared on the short-lived spin-off series in 2001, and then returned to The X-Files in its final season for an episode called "Jump the Shark."

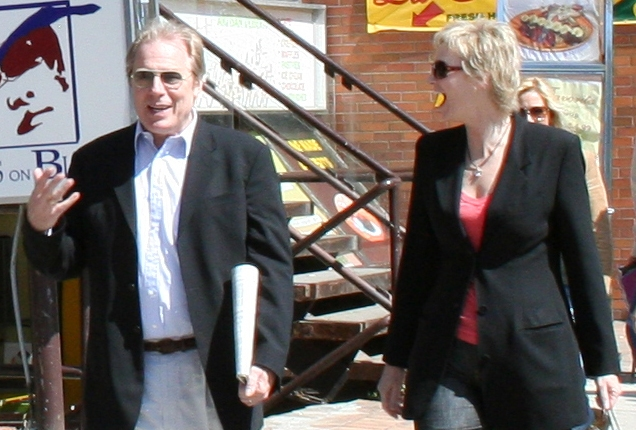
McKean and Jane Lynch at the 2006 Toronto International Film Festival

McKean reunited with Christopher Guest in Best in Show (2000) and appeared in Little Nicky (2000), The Guru (2002), And Starring Pancho Villa as Himself (2003), and A Mighty Wind (2003), in which The Folksmen are played by the actors who played as Spinal Tap. McKean had a regular role as the brassy, heavily made-up bandleader Adrian Van Voorhees in Martin Short's series Primetime Glick. He also had guest roles on such shows as Law & Order, Family Guy, SpongeBob SquarePants, and Harvey Birdman, Attorney at Law. He did voiceover work as Henry's cousin Louie on Oswald, which coincidentally featured the voice of David Lander as Henry. He lent his voice to an episode of Kevin Smith's Clerks: The Animated Series that never aired but was included on the VHS and DVD versions of the series.

In 2003, he guest-starred on Smallville, the Superman prequel in which his wife Annette O'Toole starred as Martha Kent. McKean played Perry White, who ultimately becomes Clark Kent's boss. He previously associated with the Superman universe in 1994 on the Lois & Clark: The New Adventures of Superman first-season episode "Vatman," in which he played Dr. Fabian Leek, a cloning expert who creates a Superman clone that belonged to corporate mogul Lex Luthor (John Shea). Also, during his short stint on Saturday Night Live, McKean played Perry White in a Superman spoof. McKean appeared in the Christopher Guest comedy A Mighty Wind (2003), also co-writing several songs for the film, including the title track (with Guest and Eugene Levy), which won the Grammy for Best Song Written for a Motion Picture, Television or Other Visual Media and A Kiss at the End of the Rainbow, which was nominated for the Academy Award for Best Song.

McKean performed in the Broadway production of Hairspray in 2004. He co-starred as Hines in a revival of The Pajama Game with Harry Connick, Jr. at the American Airlines Theatre in the first half of 2006. Also in 2006, McKean reunited with most of the cast of A Mighty Wind to film the comedy For Your Consideration and appeared in the play Love Song on the stage in London. His musical interests led him to a starring role in the 2008 comedy air-drumming film Adventures of Power, in which he was reunited with Jane Lynch, his co-star from For Your Consideration, in a story intended to honor the leaders and fighters of the 99% movement.

McKean acted in the pilot episode of a remake of the British series The Thick of It as the chief of staff. The pilot was directed by Guest. McKean starred in the 40th anniversary Broadway revival of Harold Pinter's The Homecoming, co-starring Ian McShane, Raul Esparza, Eve Best, and James Frain. The show opened on in 2007. In 2009, he starred in the Chicago-based Steppenwolf Theatre Company's production of Superior Donuts by playwright Tracy Letts.

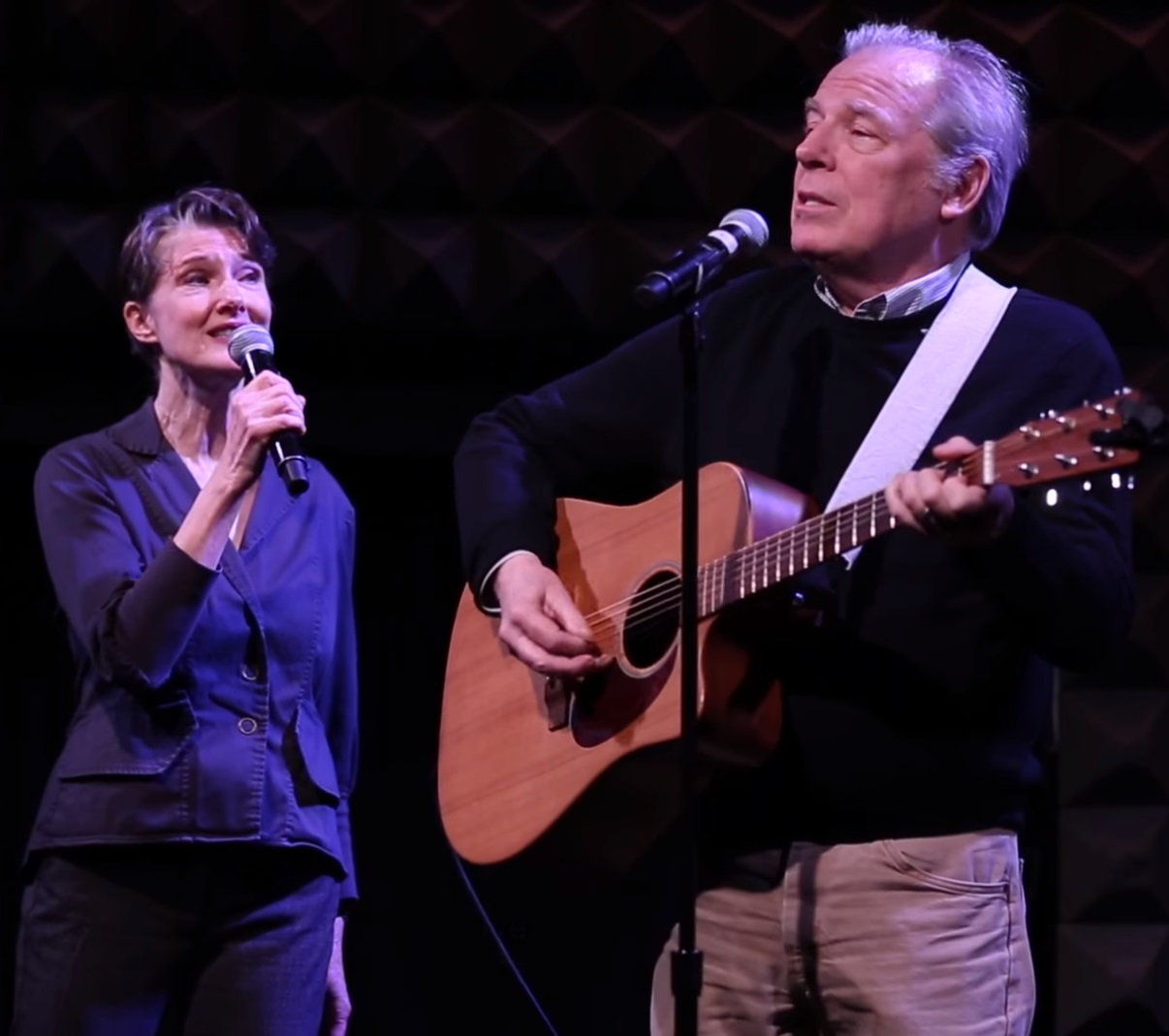
Singer-songwriter spouses Annette O'Toole and Michael McKean perform their song "Kiss at the End of the Rainbow" on Employee of the Month in 2016.

In 2010, McKean returned in an episode of Smallville alongside his wife and won a Celebrity Jeopardy! tournament defeating Jane Curtin and Cheech Marin. The earnings were donated to the International Myeloma Foundation in honor of McKean's friend Lee Grayson, who died of myeloma in 2004. In Summer 2010, McKean took over the role of the Stage Manager in Thornton Wilder's Our Town at the Barrow Street Playhouse in New York's Greenwich Village. In 2011, McKean appeared on an episode of Sesame Street as a rock star looking for "rocks" to be in an all ROCK-band.

In 2012, McKean began performing on Broadway in Gore Vidal's The Best Man. During the show's run, he was hit by a car in New York City, suffering a broken leg. He appeared in the HBO comedy series Family Tree in 2013. In 2014, McKean played J. Edgar Hoover in Broadway previews of Robert Schenkkan's Lyndon B. Johnson bio-play All the Way, starring Emmy winner Bryan Cranston as Lyndon B. Johnson.

In 2015, McKean began appearing as a regular cast member in the first three seasons of Breaking Bad spin-off Better Call Saul in the role of the main character's older brother Chuck McGill – a new character created for the series – also having guest appearances in the show's fourth and sixth seasons. The same year, McKean began hosting the Cooking Channel television series Food: Fact or Fiction? This show takes a look at food urban legends and features him both as host and narrator to some segments within each episode.

In 2018, McKean played Doug Forcett in the NBC sitcom The Good Place, a former stoner from Calgary, Alberta, Canada, who had a mushroom-induced hallucination in the 1970s and correctly guessed 92% of the afterlife. While Doug Forcett is mentioned multiple times in the show, McKean only portrayed him in one episode. McKean played Sgt. Shadwell in the 2019 television mini-series adaptation of the novel Good Omens. Following the death of Cindy Williams in January 2023, McKean is the last surviving original cast member of Laverne & Shirley.

In 2021, McKean authored a short story set in Scotland called Vodka and Spirits: A Short Scottish Ghost Story.

== Personal life ==
In 1970, McKean married Susan Russell in Westminster, California. They had two sons, Colin (1976–2012) and Fletcher (born 1985), before divorcing in 1993. Colin also became an actor, but died in 2012 from an accidental heroin overdose at the age of 36. McKean married actress and singer Annette O'Toole on March 20, 1999, becoming stepfather to her two daughters Nell and Anna.

== Characters on SNL ==
=== Recurring characters ===
- Anthony, the weatherman from Good Morning, Brooklyn

=== Celebrity impersonations ===
- Bill Clinton (after Phil Hartman left at the end of season 19)
- Jimmy Carter
- Robert Evans
- John Tesh
- Robert Shapiro
- Spalding Gray
- Tom Skerritt
- Vincent Price
- Richard Gephardt
- Jeffrey Dahmer
- Howard Stern
- Donald E. Belfi
- Adam West
- Elvis Costello
- George F. Will
- Gary Busey
- Patrick Stewart

== Acting credits ==
=== Film ===
Year	Title	Role	Notes
1977	Cracking Up	Dr. Edward O'Mazuraski	Also co-writer (as a member of The Credibility Gap)
1979	1941	Willy	
1980	Used Cars	Eddie Winslow	
1982	Young Doctors in Love	Dr. Simon August	
1984	This Is Spinal Tap	David St. Hubbins	Also co-writer
1985	D.A.R.Y.L.	Andy Richardson	
1985	Clue	Mr. Green	
1986	Jumpin' Jack Flash	Leslie	Uncredited
1987	Double Agent	Jason Starr/Warren Starbinder	
1987	Light of Day	Bu Montgomery	
1987	Planes, Trains and Automobiles	State Trooper	
1988	Portrait of a White Marriage	Rev. Prufrock	
1988	Short Circuit 2	Fred Ritter	
1988	Earth Girls Are Easy	Woody	
1989	Hider in the House	Phil Dreyer	
1989	The Big Picture	Emmett Summer	Also co-writer
1990	Flashback	Hal	
1990	Book of Love	Adult Jack Twiller	
1991	True Identity	Harvey Cooper	
1992	Memoirs of an Invisible Man	George Talbot	
1992	Man Trouble	Eddy Revere	
1993	Coneheads	Gorman Seedling	
1994	Airheads	Milo Jackson	
1994	Radioland Murders	Rick Rochester	
1995	The Brady Bunch Movie	Mr. Larry Dittmeyer	
1995	Across the Moon	Frank	
1996	Edie & Pen	Rick	
1996	The Pompatus of Love	Sitcom Star	
1996	Jack	Paulie	
1997	No Strings Attached	Elliot Lewis	
1997	Casper: A Spirited Beginning	Bill Case	Direct-to-video
1997	That Darn Cat	Peter Randall	
1997	Nothing to Lose	Phillip "P.B." Barrow	
1997	Still Breathing	New Mark	
1998	The Man Who Counted	Reverend Hooper	Short film
1998	Spinal Tap: The Final Tour	David St. Hubbins	Short film
1998	The Pass	Willie L.	
1998	Small Soldiers	Insaniac, Freakenstein	Voice
1998	Archibald the Rainbow Painter	J.P. Bigelow	
1998	With Friends Like These...	Dr. Maxwell Hersh	
1998	Sugar: The Fall of the West	Head of Sex Clinic	
1999	Masters of Horror and Suspense	Will Masters	
1999	Kill the Man	Mr. Livingston	
1999	True Crime	Reverend Shillerman	
1999	Teaching Mrs. Tingle	Principal Potter	
1999	Mystery, Alaska	Mr. Walsh	
2000	Best in Show	Stefan Vanderhoof	
2000	Beautiful	Lance DeSalvo	
2000	Little Nicky	Chief of Police	
2001	My First Mister	Bob Benson	
2001	Never Again	Alex The Transvestite	
2001	Dr. Dolittle 2	Bird 1	Voice
2002	Slap Her... She's French	Monsieur Duke	
2002	The Hunchback of Notre Dame II	Sarousch	Voice, direct-to-video
2002	Teddy Bears' Picnic	Porterfield "Porty" Pendleton	
2002	The Guru	Dwain	
2002	Auto Focus	Video Executive	
2002	100 Mile Rule	Howard	
2003	Gigantic (A Tale of Two Johns)	Himself	
2003	A Mighty Wind	Jerry Palter	
2005	The Producers	Prison Trustee	
2006	Relative Strangers	Ken Hyman	
2006	For Your Consideration	Lane Iverson	
2007	Joshua	Chester Jenkins	
2007	The Grand	Steve Lavisch	
2008	Adventures of Power	Harlan	
2009	Whatever Works	Joe	
2010	Pure Country 2: The Gift	Peter	
2012	The Words	Nelson Wylie	
2012	Batman: The Dark Knight Returns	Dr. Bartholomew Wolper	Voice, direct-to-video
2013	10 Rules for Sleeping Around	Jeffrey Fields	
2014	Sesame Street: Learning Rocks	Virgil Von Vivaldi	Direct-to-video
2015	The Meddler	Mark	
2020	Pink Skies Ahead	Richard	
2021	Playing God	Frank	
2021	My Little Pony: A New Generation	Argyle Starshine	Voice
2022	Jerry & Marge Go Large	Howard	
2022	Weird: The Al Yankovic Story	Sleazy MC	
2025	Spinal Tap II: The End Continues	David St. Hubbins	Also co-writer
2026	In Memoriam	Walter	
TBA	The Cackling of the Dodos †	TBA	Filming

=== Television ===
Year	Title	Role	Notes
1976–83	Laverne & Shirley	Leonard "Lenny" Kosnowski	149 episodes
1979	Happy Days	Leonard "Lenny" Kosnowski	Episode: "Fonzie's Funeral: Part 2"
1980	Goodtime Girls	Joey	Episode: "Internal Injury"
1984	Saturday Night Live	Himself / David St. Hubbins / Jerry Palter	2 episodes
1985	George Burns Comedy Week	Joey	Episode: "The Borrowing"
1986	Classified Love	Pete Newly	Television film
1986	Tall Tales & Legends	Mac Macintosh / Mr. Wallace	2 episodes
1987	Double Agent	Jason Starr / Warren Starbinder	Television film
1987	Daniel and the Towers	Wexler Hatch	Television film
1990	Grand	Tom Smithson	13 episodes
1990	Empty Nest	Dennis Adams	Episode: "Mad About the Boy"
1990	Murder, She Wrote	Ross McKay	Episode: "The Return of Preston Giles"
1990	The AFI Presents: TV or Not TV?	Principal Ford	Television special; segment: "Peak A Boo"
1991	Morton & Hayes	Dr. Mummenschvantz	Episode: "The Bride of Mummula"
1991	Murder in High Places	Pettibone	Television film
1991–96	Dream On	Gibby Fiske	25 episodes
1992–94	Dinosaurs	Various voices	12 episodes
1992, 1999	The Simpsons	David St. Hubbins, Jerry Rude	Voice, 2 episodes
1993–94, 1998	Animaniacs	Spink, Jake, Neivel Nosenest	3 episodes
1993	Family Album	Mr. Gordon	Episode: "Winter, Spring, Summer or Fall All You Gotta Do Is Call..."
1994	Getting By	Dirk Clearfield	Episode: "Sell It Like It Is"
1994	Lois & Clark: The New Adventures of Superman	Dr. Fabian Leek	Episode: "Vatman"
1994	Duckman	Bob Hiney	Voice, episode: "A Civil War"
1994–95	Saturday Night Live	Various Roles	25 episodes
1995	The Nanny	Prof. Noel Babcock PhD	Episode: "Franny and the Professor"
1995	Friends	Leon Rastatter	Episode: "The One with the List"
1996	The Sunshine Boys	Scott Grogan	Television film
1996	Star Trek: Voyager	The Clown	Episode: "The Thaw"
1996	Secret Service Guy	Frank McClellan	7 episodes
1996	Caroline in the City	Father Damian	Episode: "Caroline and the Wedding"
1996–98	Jungle Cubs	Cecil	Voice, 20 episodes
1996–98	Pinky and the Brain	Toll Collector / Ponytail; Schneiderlander / Mel Anoma	Voice, 4 episodes
1996–99	Tracey Takes On...	Barrington "Barry" LeTissier	6 episodes; directed 5 episodes
1997	Road Rovers	Dr. Jeffrey Otitus	Voice, episode: "Reigning Cats and Dogs"
1997	Johnny Bravo	Various voices	3 episodes
1997	The Weird Al Show	Miner	Episode: "Mining Accident"
1997	Space Ghost Coast to Coast	Himself	Episode: "BooBooKitty"
1997–98	101 Dalmatians: The Series	Jasper Badun	Voice, 27 episodes
1998	The Closer	Arthur Willhaven	2 episodes
1998	LateLine	Dick Obermeyer	Episode: "Pearce's New Buddy"
1998	Murphy Brown	Dennis Page	Episode: "Second Time Around"
1998	The Angry Beavers	L.G. Algae, Raccoon	Voice, episode: "Pond Scum"
1998	Final Justice	Merle Hammond	Television film
1998	The New Batman Adventures	1950s Joker	Voice, episode: "Legends of the Dark Knight"
1998	Mr. Show with Bob and David	Professor Peens	Episode: "Life Is Precious and God and the Bible"
1998	Recess	Mr. Bream	Voice, episode: "Yes, Mikey, Santa Does Shave"
1998–99	Maggie Winters	Lewis Stickley	2 episodes
1998–2002	The X-Files	Morris Fletcher	4 episodes
1999	Providence	Sherman Smith	Episode: "Blind Faith"
1999	Boy Meets World	Jedediah Lawrence	Episode: "State of the Unions"
1999	Pinky, Elmyra & the Brain	Grocer	Voice, episode: "The Mask of Braino"
1999–2003	Hey Arnold!	Johnny Stitches, Pinkerton, Earthflower	Voice, 2 episodes
2000	Batman Beyond	Ian Peek	Voice, episode: "Sneak Peek"
2000–01	The Huntress	Lt. Praeger / Ralph Thorson	Voice, 3 episodes
2000–01	Clerks: The Animated Series	Various voices	2 episodes
2000, 2002	Family Guy	Various voices	2 episodes
2000, 2008	Law & Order	Elias Grace / Bill Nolan	2 episodes
2001	Strip Mall	Psycho-Vivor Host	2 episodes
2001	The Lone Gunmen	Morris Fletcher	Episode: "All About Yves"
2001–02	Oswald	Maestro Bingo / Louie	Voice, 5 episodes
2001–03	Primetime Glick	Adrien Van Voorhees	30 episodes
2002	Teamo Supremo	Mean Thumb / Lo-Fi	Voice, 2 episodes
2002	As Told by Ginger	Bobby Lightfoot	Voice, episode: "Family Therapy"
2002	Justice League	Sportsman	Voice, episode: "Legends"
2002	The Zeta Project	Dr. Marcus Edmunds	Voice, episode: "The Hologram Man"
2002–05	Harvey Birdman, Attorney at Law	Evelyn Spyro Throckmorton	Voice, 4 episodes
2003	And Starring Pancho Villa as Himself	William Christy Cabanne	Television film
2003, 2010–11	Smallville	Perry White	3 episodes
2005	Alias	Dr. Atticus Liddell	2 episodes
2005	Hopeless Pictures	Mel Wax	Voice, 9 episodes
2005	Boston Legal	Dwight Biddle	Episode: "Truly, Madly, Deeply"
2006	Catscratch	Groink	Voice, episode: "Love Jackal"
2006	Help Me Help You	Dr. Howard "J." Hubbins	Episode: "Pink Feud"
2006	The Year Without a Santa Claus	Snow Miser	Television film
2007	The Grim Adventures of Billy & Mandy	Kalgoron	Voice, episode: "Wrath of the Spider Queen"
2007, 2011	Curb Your Enthusiasm	Matt Tessler	2 episodes
2008	The Unit	Dr. Donald Metz	2 episodes
2010	Glory Daze	Stu	Episode: "Why Shant This Be Love?"
2010	Sesame Street	Virgil Von Vivaldi	Episode: "Rock, Rock Band"
2011	Off the Map	Ed Greenman	Episode: "Saved by the Great White Hope"
2011	Castle	Victor Baron	Episode: "Pretty Dead"
2011	Childrens Hospital	Death	Episode: "Munch by Proxy"
2011	Glenn Martin, DDS	Eye-Hawk / Sarge	Voice, episode: "Heist"
2011	Homeland	Judge Jeffrey Turner	Episode: "Grace"
2012–13	Happy Endings	Big Dave	2 episodes
2012	Thundercats	Vultaire	Voice, 2 episodes
2012	Law & Order: Special Victims Unit	Fred Sandow	Episode: "Father's Shadow"
2012, 2016	SpongeBob SquarePants	Captain Frosty Mug, Lonnie the Shark	Voice, 2 episodes
2013	Family Tree	Keith Chadwick	4 episodes
2013	American Dad!	Emperor Zing	Voice, episode: "Lost in Space"
2014	The 7D	Uncle Humidor	Voice, 2 episodes
2015–18; 2022	Better Call Saul	Chuck McGill	28 episodes
2015–19	Food: Fact or Fiction?	Himself (host)	65 episodes
2015	Comedy Bang! Bang!	Zeus	Episode: "Stephen Merchant Wears a Checkered Shirt and Rolled Up Jeans"
2015–16	Drunk History	Carl Laemmle / Arthur Jell	2 episodes
2016–18	Goldie & Bear	Mr. Locks	Voice, 6 episodes
2017	Last Week Tonight with John Oliver	Warren G. Harding counselor	Segment: "Harding"
2018	The Good Place	Doug Forcett	Episode: "Don't Let the Good Life Pass You By"
2018	The Magic School Bus Rides Again	Jake Tennelli	Episode: "Ghost Farm"
2019	Veep	Governor Ballentine	Episode: "Oslo"
2019	Good Omens	Witchfinder Sgt. Shadwell	5 episodes
2019	Delilah	Tom Childs Sr.	Pilot
2020–22	Grace and Frankie	Jack Ayres	6 episodes
2020	Breeders	Michael	5 episodes
2020	At Home with Amy Sedaris	Guy Lombardi	Episode: "New Year's"
2020	Helpsters	Roy	Episode: "Billy Bug/Cody Rides a Bike"
2021–26	Rugrats	Lou Pickles	Voice, main role
2022	Billions	Melville Revere	Episode: "Cannonade"
2023–24	The Diplomat	President William Rayburn	5 episodes
2023	Dead Ringers	Marion	Episode: "Five"
2026	Life, Larry and the Pursuit of Unhappiness	Joseph Welch	Episode: "McCarthy"

=== Theater ===
Year	Title	Role	Venue
2004	Hairspray	Edna Turnblad	Neil Simon Theatre
2004–05	A Second Hand Memory	Phil Wellman	Linda Gross Theater
2006	The Pajama Game	Hines	American Airlines Theatre
2006	Love Song	Harry	Ambassadors Theatre
2007	South Pacific	Luther Billis	Hollywood Bowl
2007–08	The Homecoming	Sam	Cort Theatre
2009	Our Town	Stage Manager	Barrow Street Theatre
2009–10	Superior Donuts	Arthur Przybyszewski	Music Box Theatre
2011	King Lear	Earl of Gloucester	The Public Theater
2012	The Best Man	Dick Jensen	Gerald Schoenfeld Theatre
2014	All the Way	J. Edgar Hoover	American Repertory Theatre
2017	The Little Foxes	Ben Hubbard	Samuel J. Friedman Theatre
2018	The True	Erastus Corning II	Alice Griffin Jewel Box Theatre
2025	Glengarry Glen Ross	George Aaronow	Palace Theatre
2026	Are You Now or Have You Ever Been	Chairman	New York City Center Stage I

== Awards and nominations ==
Year	Award	Category	Work	Result
2004	Academy Award	Best Original Song	"A Kiss at the End of the Rainbow", from A Mighty Wind	Nominated
2004	Broadcast Film Critics Association Award	Best Original Song	"A Kiss at the End of the Rainbow", from A Mighty Wind	Won
2004	Satellite Award	Best Original Song	"A Kiss at the End of the Rainbow", from A Mighty Wind	Nominated
2004	Grammy Award	Best Song Written for Visual Media	"A Mighty Wind", from A Mighty Wind	Won
2004	Los Angeles Film Critics Association Award	Best Music	A Mighty Wind	Nominated
2004	Florida Film Critics Association Award	Best Ensemble Cast	A Mighty Wind	Won
2004	Phoenix Film Critics Society Award	Best Ensemble Acting	A Mighty Wind	Nominated
2004	Seattle Film Critics Award	Best Music	A Mighty Wind	Won
2006	Gotham Award	Best Ensemble Performance	For Your Consideration	Nominated
2016	Critics' Choice Television Award	Best Supporting Actor in a Drama Series	Better Call Saul	Nominated
2017	Critics' Choice Television Award	Best Supporting Actor in a Drama Series	Better Call Saul	Nominated
2018	Satellite Awards	Best Supporting Actor – Series, Miniseries or Television Film	Better Call Saul	Won
2018	Saturn Awards	Best Supporting Actor on Television	Better Call Saul	Won
2019	Primetime Emmy Award	Outstanding Guest Actor in a Drama Series	Better Call Saul	Nominated
