= A Mighty Wind =

2003 film by Christopher Guest

- Theatrical release poster
- Directed by: Christopher Guest
- Written by: Christopher Guest; Eugene Levy
- Produced by: Karen Murphy
- Starring: Bob Balaban; Christopher Guest; John Michael Higgins; Eugene Levy; Jane Lynch; Michael McKean; Catherine O'Hara; Parker Posey; Harry Shearer; Fred Willard
- Cinematography: Arlene Nelson
- Edited by: Robert Leighton
- Music by: Christopher Guest
- Production company: Castle Rock Entertainment
- Distributed by: Warner Bros. Pictures
- Release date: April 16, 2003
- Running time: 92 minutes
- Country: United States
- Language: English
- Budget: $6 million
- Box office: $18.7 million

A Mighty Wind is a 2003 American mockumentary comedy film about a folk music reunion concert in which three folk bands reunite for a television performance for the first time in decades. Co-written (with Eugene Levy), directed, and composed by Christopher Guest, the film is widely acknowledged to reference folk music producer Harold Leventhal as the inspiration for the character of Irving Steinbloom and more broadly parodies the American folk music revival of the early 1960s and its personalities. The film stars Guest and Levy alongside many of their frequent collaborators, including Bob Balaban, John Michael Higgins, Jane Lynch, Michael McKean, Catherine O'Hara, Parker Posey, Ed Begley Jr., Jennifer Coolidge, Harry Shearer, and Fred Willard.

A Mighty Wind was released by Warner Bros. Pictures on April 16, 2003. The film received critical acclaim while grossing $18.7 million against a $6 million budget.

== Plot ==
After folk music producer Irving Steinbloom dies, his children Jonathan, Naomi, and Elliott organize a memorial concert, hoping to feature his three most famous acts: The Folksmen, The New Main Street Singers, and Mitch & Mickey.

The Folksmen trio—Mark Shubb, Alan Barrows, and Jerry Palter—were once the most popular of the acts but have not appeared together in decades. They had several minor hits, including their most famous song "Old Joe's Place." Despite not playing or seeing each other for years, their reunion is very positive and full of good memories, so they diligently begin rehearsing for the concert. Although some tension arises over whether to include "Skeletons of Quinto", a somber song about the Spanish Civil War, in their otherwise upbeat set list, they enjoy working together again.

The New Main Street Singers are the second generation of the original Main Street Singers, formed by George Menschell, the only living member of the original group, who sings and holds a guitar he cannot play. Performers include former adult film star Laurie Bohner and her husband, life-long Main Street Singers fan Terry, now founders of Witches in Nature's Colors (WINC), a coven of modern-day witches that worships the power of color, and former juvenile delinquent Sissy Knox, whose father Fred was one of the original Main Street Singers. Their manager, Mike LaFontaine, most famously appeared as Li'l Eddie Dees' in a short-lived and mostly forgotten 1970 sitcom, Wha' Happened?. The group is known for their complex harmonies, forming what Menschell terms a "neuftet".

Mitch Cohen and Mickey Crabbe appeared as Mitch & Mickey, a former couple that released seven albums and ended performances of their most famous song, "A Kiss at the End of the Rainbow," by kissing each other. After a dramatic break-up years before the events of the film, Mickey seemingly moved on and has married a medical supply salesman named Leonard, but Mitch broke down emotionally and has never fully recovered. As the pair reunite and rehearse, romantic tension and personal regrets repeatedly imperil their participation in the concert in spite of connecting again musically.

The three groups, all of whom have sunk to various levels of musical irrelevance since their respective heyday, agree to the reunion performance, to be held at The Town Hall in New York and televised live on the Public Broadcasting Network (PBN). The acts rehearse and participate in interviews discussing their activities over the previous years and their feelings about performing again.

The show itself proceeds with two hitches: the intended opening song for The Folksmen's set, "Never Did No Wanderin'", is played first by the New Main Street Singers (the Folksmen sing it in a rugged, emotional manner consistent with the spirit of the song, while the New Main Street Singers perform it in their usual peppy, carefree manner), and Mitch temporarily disappears minutes before he and Mickey are to perform, forcing the Folksmen to extend their set. It is eventually revealed that Mitch had gone to buy a rose for Mickey, which she gratefully accepts as they go on stage. They perform "A Kiss at the End of the Rainbow", and after a suspenseful pause, conclude with the much-anticipated kiss. In the finale, all three acts sing "A Mighty Wind" together.

Six months after the concert, many of the performers detail subsequent events via interviews. Mickey is performing "The Sure-Flo Song" (about a medical device used for bladder control) at Leonard's trade show booth, while Mitch is writing poetry again, claiming to be in a "prolific phase". Mickey claims that Mitch overreacted to their onstage kiss, while Mitch insists that he no longer has feelings for Mickey, but had worried that Mickey's feelings for him might have returned. LaFontaine is trying to drum up interest for "Supreme Folk", a sitcom in which the New Main Street Singers star as characters who are Supreme Court judges by day and folk singers sharing a house by night. The Folksmen have reunited, with Shubb, now a transgender woman named Marta, sporting a revamped wardrobe and continuing to sing in a deep bass voice, followed now by a girlish giggle.

== Cast ==
- Catherine O'Hara as Mickey Crabbe
- Eugene Levy as Mitch Cohen
- Harry Shearer as Mark/Marta Shubb
- Michael McKean as Jerry Palter
- Christopher Guest as Alan Barrows
- Jane Lynch as Laurie Bohner
- John Michael Higgins as Terry Bohner
- Parker Posey as Sissy Knox
- Fred Willard as Mike LaFontaine
- Bob Balaban as Jonathan Steinbloom
- Jennifer Coolidge as Amber Cole
- Christopher Moynihan as Sean Halloran
- Jim Piddock as Leonard Crabbe
- Don Lake as Elliott Steinbloom
- Deborah Theaker as Naomi Steinbloom
- Ed Begley Jr. as Lars Olfen
- Michael Hitchcock as Lawrence E. Turpin
- Larry Miller as Wally Fenton
- Mark Nonisa as Mike Maryama
- Patrick Sauber as Jerald Smithers
- Rachael Harris as Steinbloom's Assistant
- Paul Dooley as George Menschell
- Jim Moret as Newscaster
- Laura Harris as Girl Klapper
- Stuart Luce as Irving Steinbloom
- Mary Gross as Ma Klapper
- Marty Belafsky as Ramblin' Sandy Pitnik
- Paul Benedict as Martin Berg
- Wendel Meldrum as Witch #1
- Diane Delano as Witch #2
- Bill Cobbs as Blues Musician

== Production ==
=== Origins ===
Guest, McKean and Shearer first appeared as The Folksmen in a season 10 episode of Saturday Night Live that aired on November 3, 1984, when Guest and Shearer were both repertory cast members of the show and McKean was that week's host. Earlier that year, Guest, McKean and Shearer had appeared as the title group in the mockumentary This Is Spinal Tap, a parody of aging heavy metal bands. McKean later stated, "I came and hosted a show, and in lieu of another 'Tap' piece, we did these guys."

The Folksmen later appeared in Spinal Tap's 1992 TV special, The Return of Spinal Tap, and the original concept for A Mighty Wind was to give The Folksmen their own narrative vehicle.

=== Development ===
"A Kiss at the End of the Rainbow", which was composed for the film by McKean and wife Annette O'Toole, was nominated for an Academy Award for Best Original Song.

In the commentary for the DVD release, Guest and Levy noted that, in a scene cut from the finished movie, it is explained that Menschell cannot actually play the guitar. However, just before a performance of the original Main Street Singers, he stained his shirt front and covered it up by holding a guitar for the performance, something he continued to do for all subsequent performances.

== Soundtrack ==
A Mighty Wind: The Album

Soundtrack album by various artists
- Released: April 8, 2003
- Recorded: 2002
- Venues: The Orpheum Theater, The Treehouse, The Village
- Genres: Folk; Pop/Rock; Stage & Screen; Soundtrack
- Length: 45:06
- Label: Columbia/DMZ/Sony Music Soundtrax

The official soundtrack, titled A Mighty Wind: The Album, was released on April 8, 2003, shortly before the film's premiere. It peaked at number 20 on the Billboard Top Soundtracks chart.

No.	Title	Writer(s)	Artist	Length
1.	"Old Joe's Place"	Christopher Guest/Michael McKean/Harry Shearer	The Folksmen	2:10
2.	"Just That Kinda Day"	Christopher Guest/Michael McKean	The New Main Street Singers	2:32
3.	"When You're Next to Me"	Eugene Levy	Mitch & Mickey	2:59
4.	"Never Did No Wanderin'"	Michael McKean/Harry Shearer	The Folksmen	3:04
5.	"Fare Away"	Michael McKean/C.J. Vanston	The New Main Street Singers	2:40
6.	"One More Time"	Eugene Levy/Catherine O'Hara	Mitch & Mickey	3:38
7.	"Loco Man"	Harry Shearer	The Folksmen	1:57
8.	"The Good Book Song"	Michael McKean/Rainer Ptacek/Harry Shearer	The New Main Street Singers	2:13
9.	"Skeletons of Quinto"	Christopher Guest	The Folksmen	3:28
10.	"Never Did No Wanderin'"	Michael McKean/Harry Shearer	The New Main Street Singers	2:46
11.	"The Ballad of Bobby and June"	Eugene Levy	Mitch & Mickey	4:08
12.	"Blood on the Coal"	Christopher Guest/Michael McKean/Harry Shearer	The Folksmen	3:07
13.	"Main Street Rag"	Arranged by John Michael Higgins	The New Main Street Singers	0:58
14.	"Start Me Up"	Mick Jagger/Keith Richards	The Folksmen	2:26
15.	"Potato's in the Paddy Wagon"	Michael McKean	The New Main Street Singers	2:11
16.	"A Kiss at the End of the Rainbow"	Michael McKean/Annette O'Toole	Mitch & Mickey	2:32
17.	"A Mighty Wind"	Christopher Guest/Eugene Levy/Michael McKean	The Folksmen/Mitch & Mickey/The New Main Street Singers	2:17
Total length:				45:06

Credits adapted from the album's liner notes and AllMusic.

"Start Me Up" is not performed in the film, although The Folksmen appeared on several talk shows in 2003 and performed the song in order to promote A Mighty Wind.

=== Promotional tour ===
Following the release of the film, the cast performed a show in character at the Getty Center in Los Angeles. This was followed by a seven-city U.S. tour in the fall of 2003 to promote the release of the film on DVD. The tour dates were: Philadelphia (Tower Theater, September 19), New York City (The Town Hall, September 20), Washington, D.C. (9:30 Club, September 21), Boston (Orpheum Theatre, September 22), Los Angeles (Wilshire Theatre, November 8), San Francisco (Warfield Theatre, November 9) and Seattle (McCaw Hall, November 14), with an additional performance in Vancouver, BC.

== Reception ==
=== Critical response ===
The film received mostly positive reviews. On Rotten Tomatoes, the film has an approval rating of 87% based on reviews from 175 critics, and an average rating of 7.35/10, with the sites consensus, "Though not as uproariously funny as Guest's previous movies, A Mighty Wind is also more heartfelt." On Metacritic the film has a score of 81% based on reviews from 40 critics, indicating "universal acclaim".

San Francisco Chronicle's Mick LaSalle stated that it "gently caricatures the folk music scene with dozens of delicate brush strokes, creating a picture that's increasingly, gloriously funny – as in entire lines of dialogue are lost because the audience's laughing so hard." The review also displayed a drawing of the newspaper's character of The Little Man giving a standing ovation (the Chronicle's equivalent of a five-star rating). Roger Ebert stated that "though there were many times when I laughed", "the edge is missing from Guest's usual style" perhaps because he "is too fond of the characters". Ebert gave the film two-and-a-half stars out of four.

The film was a critic's pick in The New York Times. A.O. Scott described Mickey and Mitch's music as "so twee and noodle-headed as to make Richard and Mimi Fariña sound like the Ramones never existed." He described their depiction as "something almost shockingly poignant" and concluded, "Ms. O'Hara has the sublime wit to play Mickey completely straight."

=== Awards ===
McKean and O'Toole were nominated for the Academy Award for Best Original Song, for the song "A Kiss at the End of the Rainbow," which was performed at the 76th Academy Awards by Levy and O'Hara (in character). "A Mighty Wind" won the Best Song Written for a Motion Picture, Television or Other Visual Media award for Guest, Levy, and McKean at the 46th Grammy Awards.

=== Box office ===
The film had a moderate intake for its opening day in April 2003, grossing $307,931 in total. It went on to gross $2,112,140 in 133 theatres for an average of $15,880 per theatre. With a domestic total of $17,781,006 and an international total of $969,240, the film brought in a total of $18,750,246 during its theatrical run.
