= Spinal Tap =

Spinal Tap may refer to:

- Spinal tap (medical procedure), any procedure where a needle is inserted into the spinal canal
- Spinal Tap (band), a parody English heavy metal band portrayed by three American comedians
  - This Is Spinal Tap, 1984 mockumentary film satirizing the band on tour
  - This Is Spinal Tap (soundtrack), 1984 album
  - Spinal Tap II: The End Continues, 2025 mockumentary film sequel
