= This Is Spinal Tap (soundtrack) =

Soundtrack album by Spinal Tap
- Released: March 2, 1984
- Genres: Heavy metal; hard rock; comedy rock
- Length: 35:36
- Label: Polydor
- Producers: Christopher Guest; Michael McKean; Harry Shearer

Spinal Tap chronology
This Is Spinal Tap (1984)	Break Like the Wind (1992)

Professional ratings
Review scores
Source	Rating
AllMusic	4.5/5 stars
Robert Christgau	B+
Record Mirror	4/5 stars
Select	3/5 medals

This Is Spinal Tap (or simply Spinal Tap) is the soundtrack to the film This Is Spinal Tap, released in 1984. The cover art is identical to that of the fictional album Smell the Glove featured in the film. The 2000 re-release includes lyrics and bonus tracks.

== Track listing ==
All tracks are written by Christopher Guest, Harry Shearer, Michael McKean, and Rob Reiner.

Side 1
No.	Title	Original Album (Fake)	Length
1.	"Hell Hole"	Smell the Glove	3:07
2.	"Tonight I'm Gonna Rock You Tonight"	Intravenus de Milo	2:38
3.	"Heavy Duty"	Bent for the Rent	4:28
4.	"Rock and Roll Creation"	The Gospel According to Spinal Tap: Rock N’ Roll Creation	4:08
5.	"America"	previously unreleased	3:31
6.	"Cups and Cakes" (arranged by Harlan Collins)	stand alone single	1:33

Side 2
No.	Title	Original album (Fake)	Length
1.	"Big Bottom"	Brainhammer	3:33
2.	"Sex Farm"	Shark Sandwich	3:21
3.	"Stonehenge"	The Sun Never Sweats	4:35
4.	"Gimme Some Money"	stand alone single	2:26
5.	"(Listen To The) Flower People"	Spinal Tap Sings: Listen to the Flower People & Other Favorites	2:36

The bonus tracks consist of both sides of the 1984 single "Christmas with the Devil".
Neither of these tracks are the re-recorded version from 1992's Break Like The Wind.

2000 CD bonus tracks
No.	Title	Length
12.	"Christmas with the Devil"	4:24
13.	"Christmas with the Devil" (Scratch Mix)	4:42

== Other appearances ==
"Gimme Some Money" was featured in the 1991 comedy film Don't Tell Mom the Babysitter's Dead.

The song "Tonight I'm Gonna Rock You Tonight" is featured in the video game Guitar Hero II. When played as the encore song in the career mode, the in-game band's drummer spontaneously combusts upon the song's completion, a direct reference to This Is Spinal Tap. Its riff is borrowed in the song "Athlete Cured" from the 1988 album by The Fall, The Frenz Experiment.

Seattle grunge band Soundgarden covered the song "Big Bottom" several times at their early live shows, documented on their live video Louder Than Live as well as on the Netherlands release of their 1992 "Rusty Cage" single.

San Francisco queercore band Pansy Division recorded a same-sex edit of "Big Bottom" in 1993. The track was included in their 1995 compilation album Pile Up.

"Stonehenge" is featured in the 2006 Supernatural episode "Simon Said".

In early 2007, American Express Small Business Services used "Gimme Some Money" (with vocals) as background music in a television ad.

At the Live Earth concert during the summer of 2007, Spinal Tap performed "Big Bottom" at Wembley Stadium with members of many of the other acts from the festival, including members of Beastie Boys, Metallica, Foo Fighters, and many others, all playing bass guitars. Their set also included "Stonehenge" and "Warmer Than Hell".

Spinal Tap performed "Big Bottom" on The Jimmy Kimmel Show on September 9, 2025, joined by two additional bass players, Tal Wilkenfeld and Thundercat.

== Personnel ==
=== Spinal Tap ===
- David St. Hubbins (Michael McKean) – vocals, rhythm guitar; bass guitar (track 7)
- Nigel Tufnel (Christopher Guest) – vocals, lead guitar; bass guitar (track 7), mandolin (track 9)
- Derek Smalls (Harry Shearer) – vocals, bass guitar
- Viv Savage (David Kaff) – vocals, keyboards
- Mick Shrimpton (Ric Parnell) – drums, percussion

=== Additional personnel ===
- Harlan Collins – synthesizers
- John Sinclair – keyboards

== Production ==
- Produced by Christopher Guest, Michael McKean and Harry Shearer
- Recorded, engineered and mixed by Patrick McDonald
- Editing: Kenneth Karman
