= The Otto Show =

- The Simpsons episode
- Promotional poster featuring Homer with David St. Hubbins, Derek Smalls, and Nigel Tufnel.
- Episode no.: Season 3 Episode 22
- Directed by: Wes Archer
- Written by: Jeff Martin
- Production code: 8F21
- Original air date: April 23, 1992

Guest appearances
- Christopher Guest as Nigel Tufnel; Michael McKean as David St. Hubbins

Episode features
- Chalkboard gag: "I will not spin the turtle"
- Couch gag: Santa's Little Helper growls at the family as they enter, forcing them to retreat slowly.
- Commentary: Matt Groening; James L. Brooks; Al Jean; Mike Reiss; Dan Castellaneta; Jeff Martin; Wes Archer

Episode chronology
← Previous "Black Widower"	Next → "Bart's Friend Falls in Love"
- The Simpsons season 3

"The Otto Show" is the twenty-second episode of the third season of the American animated television series The Simpsons. It first aired on Fox in the United States on April 23, 1992. In the episode, Bart wants to become a rock star after attending a Spın̈al Tap concert, so Homer and Marge buy him a guitar. He shows the guitar to the school bus driver Otto, who plays it and makes the children late for school. While racing to Springfield Elementary, Otto crashes the school bus and is suspended until he earns a driver's license. Unable to pay his rent, Otto moves in with the Simpsons.

The episode was written by Jeff Martin and directed by Wes Archer. It was the first episode of the show to feature Otto Mann in a prominent role. "The Otto Show" features an appearance from Spın̈al Tap, a parody band that first appeared in the mockumentary This Is Spinal Tap (1984). The episode guest stars Michael McKean as David St. Hubbins and Christopher Guest as Nigel Tufnel. Harry Shearer, who is a regular Simpsons cast member, reprises his This Is Spinal Tap role, Derek Smalls.

In its original airing on the Fox Network, the episode had an 11.5 Nielsen rating and finished the week ranked 41st. The episode received positive reviews and Spın̈al Tap was ranked as the 18th best guest appearance on the show by IGN.

== Plot ==
Bart and Milhouse attend a Spın̈al Tap concert, which is a complete disaster - puddles of water cover the stage (the venue is an ice hockey arena), the drummer is nearly crushed by a giant half-inflated balloon of Satan, and Nigel Tufnel (Christopher Guest) is temporarily blinded by lasers. The band walks off the set 20 minutes into the concert out of frustration, and a riot breaks out, with it being violent enough that SWAT is called in to quell it. Bart is unharmed, but Homer forgets Milhouse at the venue, where he is partially buried under a pile of folding chairs.

Following the concert, Bart decides he wants to become a rock guitarist. Homer and Marge buy him an electric guitar, but he becomes discouraged when he is not good at playing it right away. Bart bemoans his lack of progress on the morning school bus to Otto, who wows the children by playing the guitar expertly. Otto plays several songs on the guitar, which causes the children to be late for school. Otto attempts to make up for the lost time by speeding along the route; his reckless driving runs Spın̈al Tap's tour bus off the road, making it fall off a cliff and explode, and he subsequently crashes the school bus.

In the aftermath, Otto reveals he has no driver's license and is suspended without pay. In his absence, Principal Skinner drives the school bus, but finds himself easily succumbing to road rage and unable to get to school at all. Otto subsequently attempts to obtain his license but fails the test, overseen by Patty, and is evicted from his apartment because he cannot pay his rent. When Bart discovers Otto living in a dumpster, he pleads with Homer and Marge to let Otto stay in their garage, but Otto soon makes a nuisance of himself and Homer demands that he leave.

Marge and Bart encourage Otto to give the driving test one last try. A despondent Otto is reluctant until Bart reveals that Homer called him a "sponge". Enraged at Homer, Otto marches up to Patty at the DMV and tells her he is determined to retake his driving test and prove Homer wrong. The two bond over their shared dislike of Homer while Otto retakes his test, which she lets him pass, despite again doing poorly. With his new probationary driver's license, Otto regains his job and Skinner watches on in admiration.

== Production ==
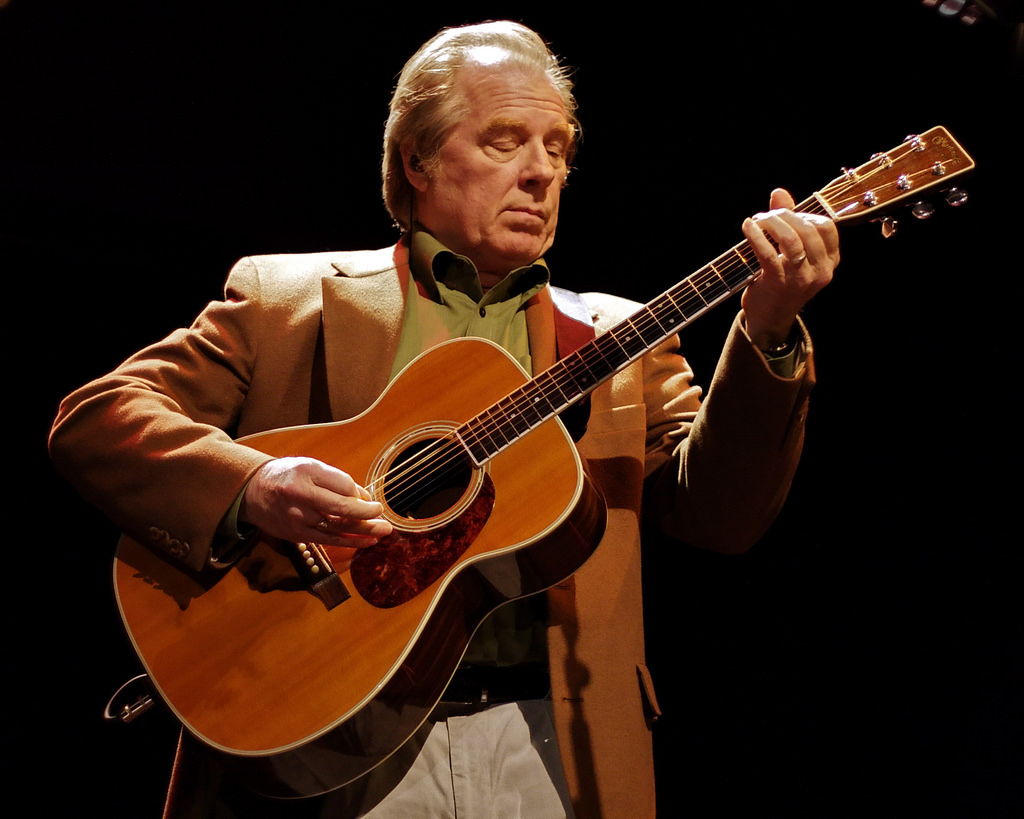
Michael McKean, who guest starred as David St. Hubbins of Spın̈al Tap.

"The Otto Show" was written by Jeff Martin and directed by Wes Archer. The episode's title is a pun on auto show. The episode was the first to feature bus driver Otto Mann in a prominent role. Otto's full name is revealed for the first time. Writers Jay Kogen and Wallace Wolodarsky had originally wanted to name him Otto Mechanic, but the animators gave him the last name Mann.

"The Otto Show" features an appearance from the characters of Spın̈al Tap, a parody band that first appeared in the mockumentary This Is Spinal Tap (1984). The episode guest stars Michael McKean as David St. Hubbins and Christopher Guest as Nigel Tufnel. Harry Shearer, a regular Simpsons cast member, co-starred in This Is Spinal Tap and reprises his role as bassist Derek Smalls. The episode follows the approach of the film by presenting Spın̈al Tap as if they were a real band. According to executive producer Al Jean, the executives at Fox were unhappy about having the band guest star, partially because it cost a lot of money to purchase rights to play their songs. Mike Reiss said that Fox felt that the show could have gotten a "real group" for that amount of money. The animators gave many of the members of the crowd at the Tap concert long bangs, so they would not have to animate many pairs of eyes. In the final scene to feature the band, their tour bus bursts into flames after being knocked off the road. According to the writers, the scene was not in the original script and was added because they felt the band's final scene was not interesting enough. In a 2016 interview Shearer said this was the only time Spın̈al Tap had worked to a script, all other movie, television and live appearances being improvised. In a 2001 interview with the San Francisco Chronicle, Harry Shearer, speaking in character as Derek Smalls, suggested that within the fictional universe of Spın̈al Tap, the bands appearance on The Simpsons represented the band making a cameo on the cartoon, rather than the events of the cartoon having actually occurred.

Marge says she hopes "the Spın̈al Taps don't play too loud." Homer says that his hearing has not been affected by heavy metal concerts and Marge replies, but her response is not heard clearly due to Homer's tinnitus. On the DVD commentary, the writers said that Marge's line was "pretty funny" and had taken a long time to write. In 2023, a fan used sound editing software to discover that Marge told Homer "Make sure they don't pick up any of the band's attitudes towards women, liquor, religion, politics...really anything."

== Cultural references ==
When Homer puts on an old jacket he finds a can of Billy Beer in one of the pockets. While waiting in the car during the Spinal Tap concert (as well as the ensuing riot), Homer sings along to the song "Spanish Flea" by Herb Alpert and the Tijuana Brass. The writers had a difficult time getting the rights to the song, but a writer who is related to a member of the band was able to get the rights at the last minute. Homer also hums along to "Summer Samba" during a prior segment in the car. Homer makes a comment on their situation with Otto, saying "This is not Happy Days and he is not The Fonz!" Otto then walks in and says to Homer, "Heeeeeyy, Mr. S." Otto plays "Free Bird" by Lynyrd Skynyrd on the school bus. Otto's statement that he would prefer to be sleeping in a Dumpster brand trash container over a "Trash Co. Waste Disposal Unit" alludes to the word's status as a generic trademark for a brand of large trash containers.

== Reception ==
In its original airing on the Fox Network, the episode had an 11.5 Nielsen rating and was viewed in approximately 10.59 million homes. It finished the week of April 20–26, 1992 ranked 41st, down from the season's average rank of 35th. The Simpsons was the fourth highest rated show on Fox that week after Married... with Children, Beverly Hills, 90210 and In Living Color.

The episode, like the whole of the third season, received mostly positive reviews from critics. The authors of the book I Can't Believe It's a Bigger and Better Updated Unofficial Simpsons Guide, Gary Russell and Gareth Roberts, wrote, "A nice episode for Otto and some great moments for Skinner as he tries to drive the bus, but especially memorable for Homer's moment of forgetfulness after the concert. Michael McKean, Christopher Guest and Harry Shearer reprise their roles from This Is Spinal Tap perfectly." MovieFreak.com's Dennis Landmann named "The Otto Show" as one of the stand-out episodes from the third season.

Nate Meyers of Digitally Obsessed praised the episode, giving it a rating of five out of five donuts and writing "The writing is at full throttle here, cramming tons of jokes into the episode's 20-minute runtime with stunning success." DVD Movie Guide's Colin Jacobson wrote that it was "another solid episode. Actually, it regresses somewhat from the high quality of its predecessors. The Spinal Tap material feels somewhat tacky – it was a tie-in with their then-current attempt to sell a new album – and Otto's not a strong character. I don’t think the series ever made him the lead again, and he works best in small doses. 'Otto' remains very good, but it doesn’t compete with the year’s best shows."

The guest appearance of Spın̈al Tap was especially noticed. Bryce Wilson, in his review of the third season for Cinema Blend, wrote "Simpson’s [sic] voice actor Harry Shearer...reunites Spinal Tap just for 'The Otto Show', an episode full of the trademark Tap banter and stage disasters that rival even the mighty 18 inch Stonehenge." IGN named Spinal Tap as the '18th best guest stars' in the show's history for this episode. Andrew Martin of Prefix Mag named Spın̈al Tap his favorite musical guests on The Simpsons out of a list of ten.
