= Longbox =

CD packaging format

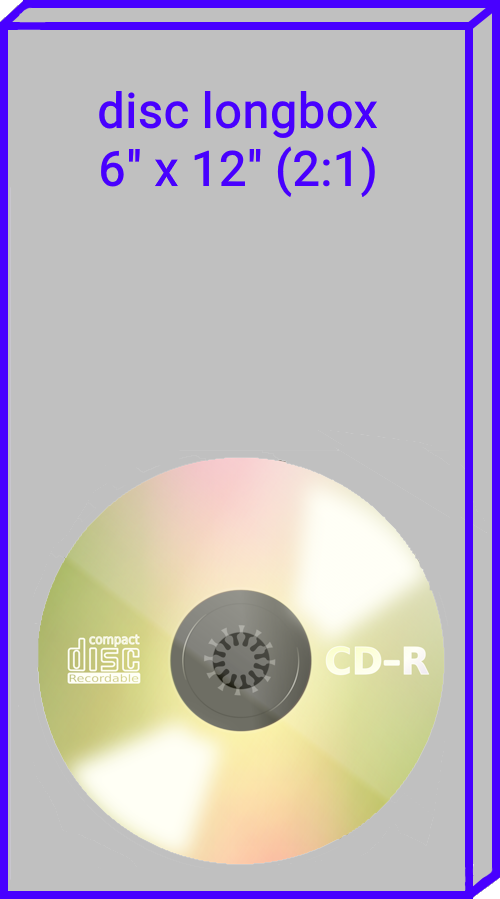
Diagram of a longbox packaging example (with a compact disc as a scaling reference).

A longbox is a form of exterior paperboard packaging for musical compact discs in widespread use in the 1980s and early 1990s in North America.

== Background ==
When compact discs first began to appear in the retail stores, the longbox packaging served a transitional purpose, allowing shops to file new compact discs in the same bins originally used for vinyl records. Longboxes were 12 inches (30 cm) tall (the same length as the standard 33⅓ LP), and capable of containing two separate discs when necessary. Most longboxes were full color, with details about the compact disc on the back, and artwork that was frequently taken from the original square album cover art, reworked for the new shape and size. There were generic white longboxes with windows that would display the compact disc cover, as well as clear plastic versions that were an inexpensive substitute for a printed longbox.

Placing the jewelcase within a cardboard enclosure made for a larger and more cumbersome package that would be more difficult to shoplift from retailers.

Longboxes began to fade from popularity as the CDs themselves became more colorful, elaborate, and customized (labels initially printed CDs with standardized, oftentimes black-on-silver labels simply listing basic information about a release and its contents). Longboxes were also considered environmentally wasteful and were expensive to produce. In North America, the drive to eliminate longboxes took hold in Canada first.

== Legacy ==
Environmental concerns of unnecessary cardboard waste from artists and consumers alike created controversy over continued use of longboxes. For instance, David Byrne included a sticker over the packaging of his album Uh-Oh reading "THIS IS GARBAGE", referring to the excessive material use of the packaging and encouraged customers to complain to retailers, while musicians such as Raffi and Peter Gabriel simply refused to have their material packaged with a longbox. In 1990, the Earth Communications Office, a coalition formed within the US entertainment industry focused on the environment, launched a movement called “Ban the Box” in an effort to eliminate longboxes. The satirical band Spinal Tap's 1992 studio album Break Like the Wind was sold in an "extra-long box" (an 18 inches (46 cm) longbox).

On the other hand, some recording executives tried to have the packaging serve a useful purpose beyond marketing such as when in 1991 Warner Music executive Jeff Gold approached the band R.E.M. about a political initiative. The band agreed to have the longbox to their album Out of Time carry printing where customers were encouraged to sign their name on the longbox as part of a petition in support of the Motor Voter Bill to ease voter registration. As a result, the participating activist group Rock the Vote received 10,000 signed longboxes and presented them to the US Congress in support of the bill, which was voted into law, although Presidential approval had to wait until the Bill Clinton administration.

Some merchants resisted this disapproval of the packaging, as longboxes theoretically made it harder for shoplifters to hide the items as well as avoiding friction with retailers. Several proposals for new types of packaging that served the display-size of the longbox and theft-prevention goals were developed. A common replacement consisted of locking plastic frames (security keepers) containing anti-theft detection strips, designed to roughly meet the same dimensions as the longbox to fit into the same racks in a record store, and removed by the cashier upon purchase. Eventually, as LP-sized sales racks were phased out, these frames were reduced to a size only slightly larger than the disc boxes themselves.

Longbox packaging was phased out officially as of April 1, 1993, due to the controversy. At the same time, major retail stores were no longer selling vinyl records and had converted their displays to accommodate shrink-wrapped jewel cases, meeting the rising consumer demand for CDs while eliminating the need for longboxes. A further inducement came when Jeff Gold convinced Warner Music's distributors that they could save $25 million by eliminating the expense of using that packaging form and placate retailers by passing on half the savings to them to help ease the conversion to the proper display fixtures.

Aside from the occasional box-set or vanity CD packaging, longbox packaging is largely obsolete. However, longboxes are still occasionally used by warehouse clubs such as Costco for both CD and DVD packaging, though the boxes are typically generic and not produced by the media distributors.

Most original longboxes were discarded upon purchase, and they have since become desirable amongst music collectors. A compact disc is worth more if it is accompanied by its original longbox.

== See also ==
- Optical disc packaging
