= Harry Shearer =

American actor (born 1943)

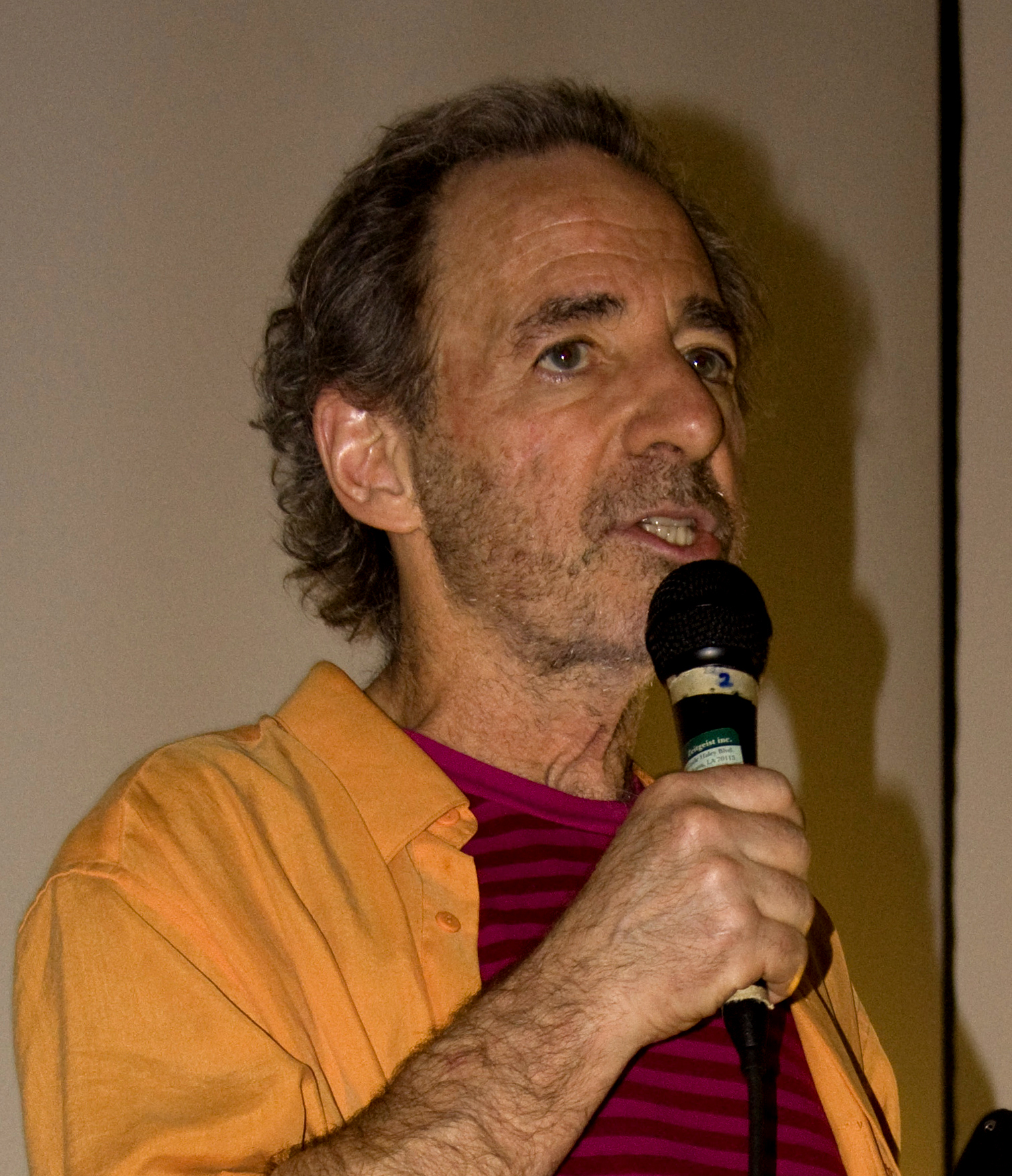
- Shearer in 2009
- Born: Harry Julius Shearer; December 23, 1943 (age 82); Los Angeles, California, U.S.
- Education: University of California, Los Angeles (BA)
- Occupations: Actor; comedian; musician; radio host; writer; producer
- Years active: 1951–present
- Spouses: Penny Nichols (m. 1974; div. 1977); Judith Owen (m. 1993)
- Website: harryshearer.com

Harry Julius Shearer (born December 23, 1943) is an American actor, comedian, musician, radio host, writer, and producer. Born in Los Angeles, California, Shearer began his career as a child actor. From 1969 to 1976, Shearer was a member of The Credibility Gap, a radio comedy group. Following the breakup of the group, Shearer co-wrote the film Real Life (1979) with Albert Brooks and worked as a writer on Martin Mull's television series Fernwood 2 Night.

Shearer was a cast member on Saturday Night Live (SNL) between 1979 and 1980, and 1984 and 1985. Shearer co-created, co-wrote and co-starred in the film This Is Spinal Tap (1984), a hit satirical rockumentary. In 1989, he joined the cast of the animated sitcom The Simpsons, providing voices for characters including Mr. Burns, Waylon Smithers, Ned Flanders, Reverend Lovejoy, Lenny Leonard, Kang, Principal Skinner, Kent Brockman, Otto Mann, Scratchy, and formerly Dr. Hibbert. Shearer has appeared in films including The Truman Show (1998) and A Mighty Wind (2003), and has directed two, Teddy Bears' Picnic (2002) and The Big Uneasy (2010). Since 1983, Shearer has been the host of the public radio comedy/music program Le Show, incorporating satire, music, and sketch comedy. He has written three books.

Shearer has won a Primetime Emmy Award and has received several other Emmy and Grammy Award nominations. He has been married to singer-songwriter Judith Owen since 1993. He became an artist in residence at Loyola University, New Orleans in 2013.

== Early life and career ==
Shearer was born December 23, 1943, in Los Angeles, California, the son of Dora, a bookkeeper, and Mack Shearer, a trained opera singer who ran a gas station. His parents were Jewish immigrants from Poland and Austria respectively. His parents escaped Nazi-occupied Europe and met in Havana, Cuba. As a child, Shearer and his family often listened to radio programs such as Bob and Ray and the weekly show for the Jewish Theological Seminary of America. His father died when he was 12 and he had his bar mitzvah the following year. Shearer grew up in the neighborhood of West Adams. Starting when Shearer was four years old, he had a piano teacher whose daughter worked as a child actress. The piano teacher later decided to make a career change and become a children's agent, since she knew people in the business through her daughter's work. The teacher asked Shearer's parents for permission to take him to an audition. Several months later, she called Shearer's parents and told them that she had gotten Shearer an audition for the radio show The Jack Benny Program. Shearer received the role when he was seven years old. He described Jack Benny as "very warm and approachable. ... He was a guy who dug the idea of other people on the show getting laughs, which sort of spoiled me for other people in comedy." Shearer has stated that one person who took him "under his wing" and was his mentor during his early days in show business was voice actor Mel Blanc, who voiced many animated characters, including Bugs Bunny, Daffy Duck and Barney Rubble; Blanc was a regular on The Jack Benny Show. He also befriended Blanc's son Noel. Shearer made his film debut in the film Abbott and Costello Go to Mars (1953), in which he had a small part, and appeared in The Robe (also 1953). Throughout his childhood and teenage years, he worked in television, film, and radio.

In 1957, Shearer played the precursor to the Eddie Haskell character in the pilot episode of the television series Leave It to Beaver. After the filming, Shearer's parents said they did not want him to be a regular in a series. Instead they wanted him to just do occasional work so that he could have a normal childhood. Shearer and his parents made the decision not to accept the role in the series if it was picked up by a television network.

In the summer of 1960, Shearer volunteered as a driver for the Democratic National Convention during the 1960 United States presidential election where he was regularly assigned trips to Disneyland.

Shearer graduated from Los Angeles High School and attended UCLA as a political science major in the early 1960s. He decided to quit show business to become a "serious person". However, he says this lasted approximately a month, and he joined the staff of the Daily Bruin, UCLA's school newspaper, during his first year. He was editor of the college humor magazine (Satyr), including the June 1964 parody Preyboy. He also worked as a newscaster at KRLA, a top 40 radio station in Pasadena, during this period. According to Shearer, after graduating, he had "a very serious agenda going on, and it was 'Stay Out of the Draft'." He attended graduate school at Harvard University for one year and worked at the state legislature in Sacramento. From 1967 to 1968, he was a high school teacher, teaching English and social studies. He left teaching following "disagreements with the administration".

From 1969 to 1976, Shearer was a member of The Credibility Gap, a radio comedy group that included David Lander, Richard Beebe, and Michael McKean. The group consisted of "a bunch of newsmen" at KRLA 1110, "the number two station" in Los Angeles. They wanted to do more than just straight news, so they hired comedians who were talented vocalists. Shearer heard about the group from a friend, so he brought over a tape to the station and nervously gave it to the receptionist. He found out he was hired that same day. The group's radio show was canceled in 1970 by KRLA and in 1971 by KPPC-FM, so they started performing in various clubs and concert venues. While at KRLA, Shearer also interviewed Creedence Clearwater Revival for the Pop Chronicles music documentary.

In 1973, Shearer appeared as Jim Houseafire on How Time Flys, an album by The Firesign Theatre's David Ossman. The Credibility Gap broke up in 1976 when Lander and McKean left to perform in the sitcom Laverne & Shirley. Shearer started working with Albert Brooks, producing one of Brooks' albums and co-writing the film Real Life (1979). Shearer also started writing for Martin Mull's television series Fernwood 2 Night. In the mid-1970s, he started working with Rob Reiner on a pilot for ABC. The show, which starred Christopher Guest, Tom Leopold and McKean, was not picked up.

== Career ==
=== Saturday Night Live ===
==== Initial run under Lorne Michaels ====
In August 1979, Shearer was hired as a writer and cast member on Saturday Night Live, one of the first additions to the show's original 1975 cast. Recommended by Al Franken to Saturday Night Live creator Lorne Michaels, the acquisition of Shearer was seen as an unofficial replacement for John Belushi and Dan Aykroyd, who were both leaving the show.

Shearer describes his experience on the show as a "living hell" and "not a real pleasant place to work." He did not get along well with the other writers and cast members and states that he was not included with the cast in the opening montage (although he was added to the montage for later episodes of the 1979–80 season) and that Michaels had told the rest of the cast that he was "just a writer".

Michaels left Saturday Night Live at the end of the fifth season, taking the entire cast with him. Shearer told new executive producer Jean Doumanian that he was "not a fan of Lorne's" and offered to stay with the show if he was given the chance to overhaul the program and bring in experienced comedians, like Christopher Guest. However, Doumanian turned him down, so he decided to leave with the rest of the cast.

==== Return in 1984 under Dick Ebersol ====
When I left, Dick [Ebersol] issued a press release, saying "creative differences." And the first person who called me for a comment on it read me that and I blurted out, "Yeah, I was creative and they were different."

— Harry Shearer

In 1984, while promoting the film This Is Spinal Tap, Shearer, Christopher Guest and Michael McKean performed on Saturday Night Live. All three members were offered the chance to join the show in the 1984–1985 season. Shearer accepted because he was treated well by the producers and he thought the backstage environment had improved but later stated that he "didn't realize that guests are treated better than the regulars." Guest also accepted the offer while McKean rejected it, although he would join the cast in 1994.

Dick Ebersol, who replaced Lorne Michaels as the show's producer, said that Shearer was "a gifted performer but a pain in the butt. He's just so demanding on the preciseness of things and he's very, very hard on the working people. He's just a nightmare-to-deal-with person." In January 1985, Shearer left the show for good, partially because he felt he was not being used enough. Martin Short said Shearer "wanted to be creative and Dick [Ebersol] wanted something else. ... I think he felt his voice wasn't getting represented on the show. When he wouldn't get that chance, it made him very upset."

=== Spinal Tap ===
Shearer co-created, co-wrote and co-starred in Rob Reiner's film This Is Spinal Tap (1984). Shearer, Reiner, Michael McKean and Christopher Guest received a deal to write a first draft of a screenplay for a company called Marble Arch. They decided that the film could not be written and instead filmed a 20-minute demo of what they wanted to do. It was eventually greenlighted by Norman Lear and Jerry Perenchio at Embassy Pictures. The film satirizes the wild personal behavior and musical pretensions of hard rock and heavy metal bands, as well as the hagiographic tendencies of rockumentaries of the time. The three core members of the band Spinal Tap—David St. Hubbins, Derek Smalls and Nigel Tufnel—were portrayed by McKean, Shearer and Guest respectively. The three actors play their musical instruments and speak with mock English accents throughout the film. There was no script, although there was a written breakdown of most of the scenes, so it was mostly improvised except for the songs. It was filmed in 25 days.

Shearer said in an interview that "The animating impulse was to do rock 'n' roll right. The four of us had been around rock 'n' roll and we were just amazed by how relentlessly the movies got it wrong. Because we were funny people it was going to be a funny film, but we wanted to get it right." When they tried to sell it to various Hollywood studios, they were told that the film would not work. The group kept saying, "No, this is a story that's pretty familiar to people. We're not introducing them to anything they don't really know," so Shearer thought it would at least have some resonance with the public. The film was only a modest success upon its initial release but found greater success, and developed a cult following, after its video release. In 2000, the film was ranked 29th on the American Film Institute's list of the top 100 comedy movies in American cinema and it was selected for preservation in the United States National Film Registry by the Library of Congress as being "culturally, historically, or aesthetically significant".

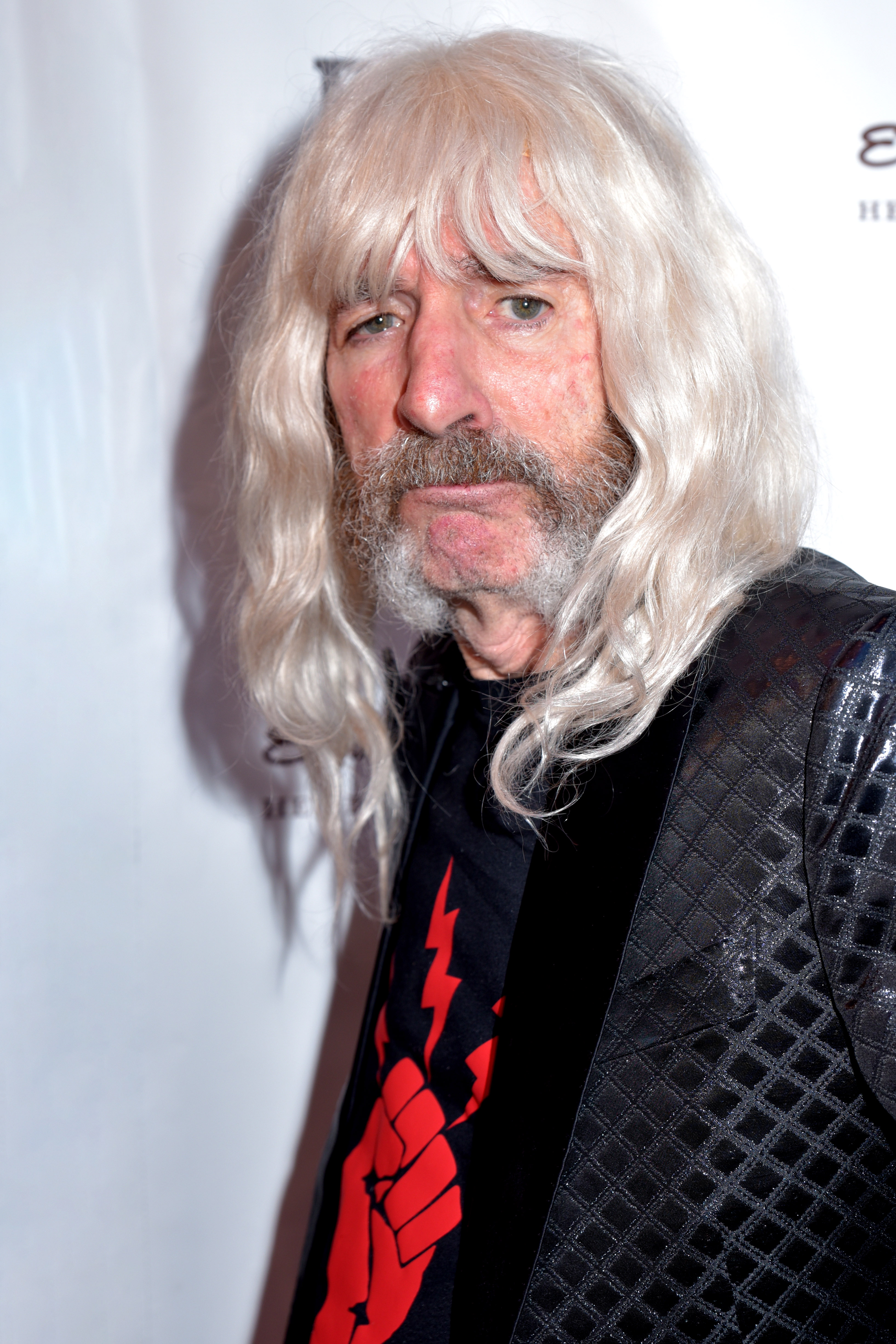
Shearer as "Derek Smalls" (2019)

Shearer, Guest and McKean have since worked on several projects as their Spinal Tap characters. They released three albums: This Is Spinal Tap (1984), Break Like the Wind (1992) and Back from the Dead (2009). In 1992, Spinal Tap appeared in an episode of The Simpsons called "The Otto Show". The band has played several concerts, including at Live Earth in London on July 7, 2007. In anticipation of the show, Rob Reiner directed a short film entitled Spinal Tap. In 2009, the band released Back from the Dead to commemorate the 25th anniversary of the release of the film. The album features re-recorded versions of songs featured in This Is Spinal Tap and its soundtrack, and five new songs. The band performed a one-date "world tour" at London's Wembley Arena on June 30, 2009. The Folksmen, a mock band featured in the film A Mighty Wind that is also made up of characters played by Shearer, McKean and Guest, was the opening act for the show.

=== The Simpsons ===
Shearer is known for his work as a voice actor on The Simpsons. Matt Groening, the creator of the show, was a fan of Shearer's work, while Shearer was a fan of a column Groening used to write. When approached by Groening to be in the series, Shearer was initially reluctant because he thought the recording sessions would be too much trouble. He felt that voice acting was "not a lot of fun" as, traditionally, voice actors record their parts separately. He was told that the actors would record their lines together, and after three phone calls for executive producer James L. Brooks, Shearer was convinced to join the cast of The Simpsons. Shearer's first impression of The Simpsons was that it was funny. He thought it was a "pretty cool" way to work but found it peculiar that his fellow cast members were adamant about not being known to the public as the people behind the voices.

Shearer provides voices for Principal Skinner, Kent Brockman, Mr. Burns, Waylon Smithers, Ned Flanders, Reverend Lovejoy, formerly Dr. Hibbert until 2021, Lenny Leonard, Otto Mann, Rainier Wolfcastle, Scratchy, Kang, Dr. Marvin Monroe, and Judge Snyder, among others. He has described all of his regular characters' voices as "easy to slip into. ... I wouldn't do them if they weren't easy." Shearer modeled Mr. Burns's voice on the two actors Lionel Barrymore and Ronald Reagan. Shearer says that Burns is the most difficult character for him to voice because it is rough on his vocal cords and he often needs to drink tea and honey to soothe his voice. He describes Burns as his favorite character, saying he "like[s] Mr. Burns because he is pure evil. A lot of evil people make the mistake of diluting it. Never adulterate your evil." Shearer is also the voice of Burns' assistant Smithers, and is able to perform dialogue between the two characters in one take. In the episode "Bart's Inner Child", Shearer said "wow" in the voice of Otto, which was then used when Otto was seen jumping on a trampoline. Ned Flanders had been meant to be just a neighbor that Homer Simpson was jealous of, but because Shearer used "such a sweet voice" for him, Flanders was broadened to become a Christian and a sweet guy that someone would prefer to live next to over Homer. Dr. Marvin Monroe's voice was based on psychiatrist David Viscott. Monroe has been largely retired since the seventh season barring a few cameo appearances because voicing the character strained Shearer's throat.

In 2004, Shearer criticized what he perceived as the show's declining quality: "I rate the last three seasons as among the worst, so season four looks very good to me now." Shearer has also been vocal about "The Principal and the Pauper" (season nine, episode two, 1997), one of the most controversial episodes of The Simpsons. Many fans and critics reacted negatively to the revelation that Principal Seymour Skinner, a recurring character since the first season, was an impostor. The episode has been criticized by both Shearer and Groening. In a 2001 interview, Shearer recalled that after reading the script, he told the writers, "That's so wrong. You're taking something that an audience has built eight years or nine years of investment in and just tossed it in the trash can for no good reason, for a story we've done before with other characters. It's so arbitrary and gratuitous, and it's disrespectful to the audience." In a December 2006 interview, Shearer added, "Now, [the writers] refuse to talk about it. They realize it was a horrible mistake. They never mention it. It's like they're punishing [the audience] for paying attention."

Due to scheduling and availability conflicts, Shearer decided not to participate in The Simpsons Ride, which opened in 2008, so none of his characters have vocal parts and many do not appear in the ride at all. In a 2010 interview on The Howard Stern Show, Shearer alluded that the reason he was not part of the ride was because he would not be getting paid for it. Similarly, Shearer was unable to appear in the Family Guy crossover episode "The Simpsons Guy" due to further scheduling conflicts. Therefore, his characters are again mute. When asked about how he felt about the crossover, Shearer replied, "Matter and anti-matter."

Until 1998, Shearer was paid $30,000 per episode. During a pay dispute in 1998, Fox threatened to replace the six main voice actors with new actors, going as far as preparing for casting of new voices. The dispute, however, was resolved and Shearer received $125,000 per episode until 2004, when the voice actors demanded that they be paid $360,000 an episode. The dispute was resolved a month later, and Shearer's pay rose to $250,000 per episode. After salary re-negotiations in 2008, the voice actors received $400,000 per episode. Three years later, with Fox threatening to cancel the series unless production costs were cut, Shearer and the other cast members accepted a 30% pay cut, down to just over $300,000 per episode. On May 14, 2015, Shearer announced he was leaving the show. After the other voice actors signed a contract for the same pay, Shearer refused, stating it was not enough. Al Jean made a statement from the producers saying "the show must go on," but did not elaborate on what might happen to the characters Shearer voiced. On July 7, 2015, Shearer agreed to continue with the show, on the same terms as the other voice actors.

=== Le Show and radio work ===
Because I don't do stand-up, radio has always been my equivalent, a place to stay in connection with the public and force myself to write every week and come up with new characters. Plus it's a medium that – having grown up with it and putting myself to sleep with a radio under my pillow [as a kid] – I love. No matter what picture you want to create in the listener's mind, a few minutes of work gets it done.

— Harry Shearer

Since 1983, Shearer has been the host of the public radio comedy/music program Le Show. The program is a sequence of themed satirical news commentary segments, interspersed with music and sketch comedy, that takes aim at the "mega morons of the mighty media". It is carried on many National Public Radio and other public and community radio stations throughout the United States. Since the merger of the Sirius and XM satellite radio services the program became unavailable on the service of the merged company, SiriusXM. The show has also been made available as a podcast on iTunes and by WWNO. On the weekly program Shearer alternates between DJing, reading and commenting on the news of the day after the manner of Mort Sahl, and performing original (mostly political) comedy sketches and songs. In 2008, Shearer released a music CD called Songs of the Bushmen, consisting of his satirical numbers about former President George W. Bush on Le Show. Shearer says he criticizes both Republicans and Democrats equally, and also says that "the iron law of doing comedy about politics is you make fun of whoever is running the place" and that "everyone else is just running around talking. They are the ones who are actually doing something, changing people's lives for better or for worse. Other people the media calls 'satirists' don't work that way."

Since encountering satellite news feeds when he worked on Saturday Night Live, Shearer has been fascinated with the contents of the video that does not air. Shearer refers to these clips as found objects. "I thought, wow, there is just an unending supply of this material, and it's wonderful and fascinating and funny and sometimes haunting – but it's always good," said Shearer. He collects this material and uses it on Le Show and on his website. In 2008, he assembled video clips of newsmakers from this collection into an art installation titled "The Silent Echo Chamber" which was exhibited at The Aldrich Contemporary Art Museum in Ridgefield, Connecticut. The exhibit was also displayed in 2009 at Institut Valencià d'Art Modern (IVAM) in Valencia, Spain and in 2010 at the New Orleans Contemporary Arts Center.

In 2006 Shearer appeared with Brian Hayes in four episodes of the BBC Radio 4 sitcom Not Today, Thank You, playing Nostrils, a man so ugly he cannot stand to be in his own presence. He was originally scheduled to appear in all six episodes but had to withdraw from recording two due to a problem with his work permit. On June 19, 2008, it was announced that Shearer would receive a star on the Hollywood Walk of Fame in the radio category.

=== Further career ===
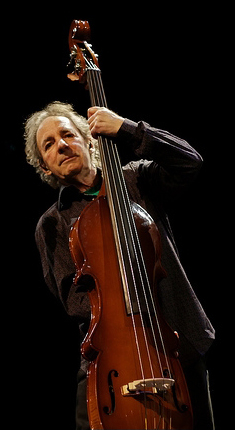
Shearer performing in April 2009

Shearer's first feature film as director, Teddy Bears' Picnic, which he also wrote, was released in 2002. The plot is based on Bohemian Grove, which hosts a three-week encampment of some of the most powerful men in the world. The film was not well received by critics. It garnered a 0% approval rating on Rotten Tomatoes, with all 19 reviews being determined as negative and received a rating of 32 out of 100 (signifying "generally negative reviews") on Metacritic from 10 reviews. In 2003, he co-wrote J. Edgar! The Musical with Tom Leopold, which spoofed J. Edgar Hoover's relationship with Clyde Tolson. It premiered at the U.S. Comedy Arts Festival in Aspen, Colorado and starred Kelsey Grammer and John Goodman.

Shearer, Guest and McKean starred in the folk music mockumentary A Mighty Wind (2003), portraying a band called The Folksmen. The film was written by Guest and Eugene Levy, and directed by Guest. Shearer had a major role in the Guest-directed parody of Oscar politicking For Your Consideration released in 2006. He played Victor Allan Miller, a veteran actor who is convinced that he is going to be nominated for an Academy Award. He also appeared as a news anchor in Godzilla (1998) with fellow The Simpsons cast members Hank Azaria and Nancy Cartwright. His other film appearances include The Right Stuff (1983), The Fisher King (1991), The Truman Show (1998), Small Soldiers (also 1998), and EDtv (1999). He also directed and appeared in the television program Portrait of a White Marriage (1988), a sequel to The History of White People in America.

Shearer has also worked as a columnist for the Los Angeles Times Magazine, but decided that it "became such a waste of time to bother with it." His columns have also been published in Slate and Newsweek. Since May 2005 he has been a contributing blogger at The Huffington Post. Shearer has written three books. Man Bites Town, published in 1993, is a collection of columns that he wrote for The Los Angeles Times between 1989 and 1992. Published in 1999, It's the Stupidity, Stupid analyzed the hatred some people had for then-President Bill Clinton. Shearer believes that Clinton became disliked because he had an affair with "the least powerful, least credentialed woman cleared into his official compound." His most recent book is Not Enough Indians, his first novel. Published in 2006, it is a comic novel about Native Americans and gambling. Without the "pleasures of collaboration" and "spontaneity and improvisation which characterize his other projects", Not Enough Indians was a "struggle" for Shearer to write. He said that "the only fun thing about it was having written it. It was lonely, I had no deal for it and it took six years to do. It was a profoundly disturbing act of self-discipline."

Shearer has released five solo comedy albums: It Must Have Been Something I Said (1994), Dropping Anchors (2006), Songs Pointed and Pointless (2007), Songs of the Bushmen (2008) and Greed and Fear (2010). His most recent CD, Greed and Fear is mainly about Wall Street economic issues, rather than politics like his previous albums. Shearer decided to make the album when he"started getting amused by the language of the economic meltdown – when 'toxic assets' suddenly became 'troubled assets,' going from something poisoning the system to just a bunch of delinquent youth with dirty faces that needed not removal from the system but just ... understanding." In May 2006, Shearer received an honorary doctorate from Goucher College.

=== The Big Uneasy ===
Shearer is the director of The Big Uneasy (2010), a documentary film about the impacts of Hurricane Katrina on New Orleans. Narrated by actor John Goodman, the film describes levee failures and catastrophic flooding in the New Orleans metropolitan area, and includes extended interviews with former LSU professor Ivor Van Heerden, Robert Bea, an engineering professor at the University of California at Berkeley, and Maria Garzino, an engineer and contract specialist for the Los Angeles district of the U.S. Army Corps of Engineers. The film is critical of the U.S. Army Corps of Engineers and its management of flood protection projects in Southern Louisiana. Shearer draws on numerous technical experts to maintain that Hurricane Katrina's "... tragic floods creating widespread damage were caused by manmade errors in engineering and judgment." On review aggregator Rotten Tomatoes, the film has an approval rating of 71% based on 24 reviews, with an average rating of 6.85/10. The website's critical consensus reads, "The Big Uneasy offers an admittedly uneven – yet still worthy and well-intentioned – look at a horrific disaster's aftermath."

== Personal life ==
Shearer married folk singer Penelope Nichols in 1974. They divorced in 1977. He has been married to Welsh singer-songwriter Judith Owen since 1993. In 2005, the couple launched their own record label called Courgette Records. Shearer primarily resides in the French Quarter of New Orleans, Louisiana, but has homes in Santa Monica, California and Notting Hill, London. He first went to New Orleans in 1988 and has attended every New Orleans Jazz & Heritage Festival since.

Shearer often speaks and writes about the failure of the Federal levee system which flooded New Orleans during Hurricane Katrina, blasting the coverage of it in the mainstream media and criticizing the role of the United States Army Corps of Engineers. Prior to the DVD release of his film The Big Uneasy, Shearer would hold screenings of the film at different venues and take questions from audience members.

== Filmography ==
=== Film ===
Year	Film	Role	Notes
1953	Abbott and Costello Go to Mars	Boy	
1953	The Robe	David	
1977	Star Wars	Dex Tiree, Edmos Khurgee, Hija	Voice; uncredited
1977	Prime Time a.k.a. American Raspberry	Trucker's friend	
1977	Cracking Up	Various characters	Credited as part of "The Credibility Gap"
1979	Real Life	Pete	Also co-writer
1979	The Fish That Saved Pittsburgh	Murray Sports	
1980	Loose Shoes	Narrator	Voice
1980	One Trick Pony	Bernie Wepner	
1983	The Right Stuff	NASA Recruiter	
1984	This Is Spinal Tap	Derek Smalls	Also co-writer, composer and musician
1987	Flicks	Narrator	Voice
1988	Plain Clothes	Simon Feck	
1988	My Stepmother Is an Alien	Carl Sagan	Voice
1990	Marilyn Hotchkiss' Ballroom Dancing and Charm School	Announcer	Voice, short film
1991	Blood and Concrete	Sammy Rhodes	
1991	Oscar	Guido Finucci	
1991	Pure Luck	Monosoff	
1991	The Fisher King	Ben Starr	
1992	A League of Their Own	Newsreel Announcer	Voice
1993	Wayne's World 2	Handsome Dan	
1994	I'll Do Anything	Audience Research Captain	
1994	Little Giants	Announcer	
1994	Speechless	Chuck	
1997	My Best Friend's Wedding	Jonathan P.F. Rice	
1997	Waiting for Guffman	N/A	Composer
1998	Godzilla	Charles Caiman	
1998	Almost Heroes	Narrator	Voice
1998	The Truman Show	Mike Michaelson	
1998	Small Soldiers	Punch-It	Voice
1999	EDtv	Moderator	
1999	Encounter in the Third Dimension	Narrator	Voice
1999	Dick	G. Gordon Liddy	
2000	Catching Up with Marty DiBergi	Derek Smalls	Short film
2000	Edwurd Fudwupper Fibbed Big	General	Voice
2001	Haiku Tunnel	Orientation leader	
2001	Out There	Dr. Gerard	
2001	Haunted Castle	Mr. D; Mephisto	Voice
2002	Teddy Bears' Picnic	Joey Lavin	Also writer, director and executive producer
2003	A Mighty Wind	Mark Shubb	
2005	Marilyn Hotchkiss' Ballroom Dancing and Charm School	Promo announcer	Voice
2005	Chicken Little	Don Bowowser	Voice
2006	For Your Consideration	Victor Allan Miller	
2007	A Couple of White Chicks at the Hairdresser	Marc Gavin	
2007	The Simpsons Movie	Various Characters	Voice
2010	The Big Uneasy	Narrator	Voice; also director and producer
2011	Flood Streets	Dr. Keeley	Also executive producer
2015	Love & Taxes	Sean Boykin/Agent	
2016	Mascots	Competition Announcer	Voice
2017	XTC: This Is Pop	Himself	Documentary
2017	Father Figures	Gene Baxter	
2019	Easy Does It	"Breezy" Bob Mckee	Voice
2023	The Session Man	Himself	
2025	Spinal Tap II: The End Continues	Derek Smalls	Also co-writer

=== Television ===
Year	Series	Role	Notes
1953, 1955	The Jack Benny Program	Young Jack Benny	2 episodes
1955	The Donald O'Connor Show	Himself	Episode 1.7
1955	It's a Great Life	Terry	Episode: "The Paper Drive"
1955	Death Valley Days	Unnamed character	Episode: "The Valencia Cake"
1956	Private Secretary	Chuckie Wills, shoeshine boy	Episode: "The Little Caesar of Bleecker Street"
1957	General Electric Theater	Timmy	Episode: "Cab Driver"
1957	Studio 57	Frankie Bennett	Episode: "It's a Small World" (Pilot for the eventual series Leave It to Beaver, though never aired as part of that series.)
1957	Alfred Hitchcock Presents	Street Kid	Episode: "The Night the World Ended"
1976	Serpico	Hippy	TV film/Pilot: "The Deadly Game"
1976–82	Laverne & Shirley	Various characters	Appeared in six episodes; also co-wrote episode "Hi, Neighbor"
1977	Fernwood 2 Night		Writer
1978	America 2-Night		Writer
1979	Stockard Channing in Just Friends	Saul	Episode: "The Ziegenfuss Force"
1979	The T.V. Show	Various characters	Pilot; also writer, producer and composer
1979–80, 1984–85	Saturday Night Live	Various characters	Appeared in 32 episodes; also co-wrote 39 episodes
1980	Animalympics	Keen Hacksaw/Mayor of Animal Olympic Island/Burnt Woody/Mark Spritz	Voice, TV film
1981	Likely Stories, Vol. 1	Various characters	TV film; also co-wrote
1982	Million Dollar Infield	Jack Savage	TV film
1985	The History of White People in America	Rabbi	TV film; also director
1986	Viva Shaf Vegas	Rabbi	TV film; also director, writer and executive producer
1986	The History of White People in America: Volume II	Rabbi	TV film; also director
1986	Spitting Image: Down And Out In The White House	Additional voice	Pilot/TV special
1986	ALF	Larry / President	Voice, episode: "Pennsylvania 6-5000"
1987	Spitting Image: The 1987 Movie Awards	Additional voice	TV special
1987	Spitting Image: The Ronnie and Nancy Show	Additional voice	TV special
1987	Down and Out with Donald Duck	Additional voices	TV special
1988	Portrait of a White Marriage	Unnamed character	TV film; also director
1988	Miami Vice	FBI Agent Timothy Anderson	Episode: "The Cows of October"
1988	Merrill Markoe's Guide to Glamorous Living	Unnamed character	TV special
1989–1990	Not Necessarily the News	Various Characters	2 episodes
1989–present	The Simpsons	Ned Flanders, Mr. Burns, Dr. Hibbert (1990–2021), Waylon Smithers, Principal Skinner, Reverend Lovejoy, Various characters	Voice
1990	The Golden Girls	George H. W. Bush	Voice, episode: "The President's Coming! The President's Coming! Part 2"
1990	Hometown Boy Makes Good	Unnamed character	Voice, TV film
1990	Murphy Brown	Chris Bishop	Episode: "The 390th Broadcast"
1991	Sunday Best	Various characters	
1993	Dream On	Steve	Episode: "Home Sweet Homeboy"
1993	L.A. Law	Gordon Huyck	Episode: "Safe Sex"
1993	Animaniacs	Ned Flat	Voice, episode: "Fair Game"
1994	Ellen	Ted	Episode: "The Trainer"
1995	Friends	Dr. Baldharar	Episode: "The One with the Fake Monica"
1995	Sliders	Day Tripper	Voice, episode: "Pilot"; uncredited
1995	Frontline	Larry Hages	Episode: "Changing the Face of Current Affairs"
1995	The Show Formerly Known as the Martin Short Show	Mr. Blackwell	TV special
1996	State of the Union: Undressed	Newt Gingrich	TV special
1996	Chicago Hope	Nowhere man	Episode: "A Time to Kill"
1997	Tracey Takes On...	Ronald Littleman	Episode: "Race Relations"
1997	ER	John Smythe	Episode: "Calling Dr. Hathaway"
1997	The Visitor	Louis Faraday	Episode: "Fear of Flying"
1998	George & Leo	Unnamed character	Episode: "The Poker Game"
1998	Dr. Katz, Professional Therapist	Himself	Voice, episode: "Feng Shui"
1999	Seven Days	Walter Landis	Episode: "EBE's"
1999	Just Shoot Me!	Larry Fenwick	Episode: "A Divorce to Remember"
1999–2001	Jack & Jill	Dr. Wilfred Madison	4 episodes
2000–01	Dawson's Creek	Principal Peskin	2 episodes
2001	That's Life	Dean	Episode: "Oh, Baby!"
2002	The Agency	The President	Episode: "The Gauntlet"
2003	Mad TV	Mark Shubb	Episode #8.21
2004	Jakers! The Adventures of Piggley Winks	Unnamed sheep	Episode: "No Girls Allowed"
2006	After Hours with Daniel	Himself	
2008	The Graham Norton Show	Himself	Series 4, episode 1
2012	Nixon's the One	Richard Nixon	TV special
2012	Have I Got News for You	Himself	Series 44, episode 5
2014	Outnumbered	Mr Johnson	Episode: "Communication Skills"
2016	Would I Lie to You?	Himself	Series 10, episode 3
2016	The Mr. Peabody & Sherman Show	Jazzman / Ghost #2	Voice, 2 episodes
2018	The Last Leg	Himself	Series 14, episode 2
2019	Paul Shaffer Plus One	Derek Smalls	Episode: "Harry Shearer as Derek Smalls of Spinal Tap"
2020	The Salon	Marc Gavin/Marc	4 episodes

=== Video games ===
Year	Game	Role
1992	The Simpsons: Bart's Nightmare	Smilin' Joe Fission
1996	The Simpsons Cartoon Studio	Various characters
1997	Virtual Springfield	Various characters
2001	The Simpsons Wrestling	Various characters
2001	The Simpsons: Road Rage	Various characters
2002	The Simpsons Skateboarding	Various characters
2003	The Simpsons: Hit & Run	Various characters
2005	Chicken Little	Don Bowowser
2007	The Simpsons Game	Various characters
2012	The Simpsons: Tapped Out	Various characters
2026	Monopoly Go!	Mr. Burns, Waylon Smithers

=== Web ===
Year	Film	Role	Notes
2011	Kevin Pollak's Chat Show	Himself/Guest	Episode: "125"
2021–present	Deutsche Eisenbahnmärchen	Hans, Jürgen Heisler	Voices

=== Music videos ===
Year	Song	Role	Artist	Notes	Ref.
1990	"Do the Bartman"	Seymour Skinner	Nancy Cartwright		
1998	"Come with Me"	Charles Caiman	Puff Daddy featuring Jimmy Page	Archive footage	

== Discography ==
Album	Release	Label
It Must Have Been Something I Said	1994	Rhino
Dropping Anchors	2006	Courgette
Songs Pointed and Pointless	2007	Courgette
Songs of the Bushmen	2008	Courgette
Greed and Fear	2010	Courgette
Can't Take A Hint	2012	Courgette
Smalls Change	2018	Twanky Records/BMG
The Many Moods Of Donald Trump	2020	Twanky

== Bibliography ==
- Shearer, Harry (1993). Man Bites Town. St Martins Press. ISBN 0-312-08842-6.
- Shearer, Harry (1999). It's the Stupidity, Stupid: Why (Some) People Hate Clinton and Why the Rest of Us Have to Watch. Ballantine Books/Library of Contemporary Thought. ISBN 0-345-43401-3.
- Shearer, Harry (2006). Not Enough Indians. Justin, Charles and Company. ISBN 1-932112-46-4.

== Awards ==
Shearer was the last of the six regular voice actors from The Simpsons to win the Primetime Emmy Award for Outstanding Character Voice-Over Performance. His win came for the season 25 episode "Four Regrettings and a Funeral".

Year	Award	Category	Series/album	Result	Ref.
1978	Primetime Emmy Award	Outstanding Writing in a Comedy-Variety or Music Series	America 2Night	Nominated	
1980	Primetime Emmy Award	Outstanding Writing in a Variety or Music Program	Saturday Night Live	Nominated	
2008	Grammy Award	Best Comedy Album	Songs Pointed and Pointless	Nominated	
2009	Grammy Award	Best Comedy Album	Songs of the Bushmen	Nominated	
2009	Primetime Emmy Award	Outstanding Voice-Over Performance	The Simpsons: "The Burns and the Bees"	Nominated	
2010	Grammy Award	Best Comedy Album	Back from the Dead (with Spinal Tap)	Nominated	
2014	Primetime Emmy Award	Outstanding Character Voice-Over Performance	The Simpsons: "Four Regrettings and a Funeral"	Won	

== Bibliography ==
- Groening, Matt (1997). Richmond, Ray; Coffman, Antonia (eds.). The Simpsons: A Complete Guide to Our Favorite Family (1st ed.). New York: HarperPerennial. ISBN 978-0-06-095252-5. LCCN 98141857. OCLC 37796735. OL 433519M..
- Shales, Tom; Miller, James Andrew (2002). Live from New York: An Uncensored History of Saturday Night Live (1st ed.). Little, Brown and Company. ISBN 0-316-78146-0.
