= Break Like the Wind =

Studio album by Spinal Tap
- Released: March 17, 1992
- Genres: Heavy metal; comedy rock
- Length: 49:54
- Labels: MCA; Geffen
- Producers: Spinal Tap; T-Bone Burnett; Dave Jerden; Danny Kortchmar; Steve Lukather

Spinal Tap chronology
This Is Spinal Tap (1984)	Break Like the Wind (1992)	Back from the Dead (2009)

Professional ratings
Review scores
Source	Rating
AllMusic	2/5 stars
Rolling Stone	3/5 stars

Break Like the Wind is the second album by the comedy heavy metal band Spinal Tap. The songs include a range of genres, from the glam metal anthem "Bitch School" down to the skiffle satire of "All the Way Home". The title, and the album's title track, is a double entendre that combines and confuses the idiom of moving "like the wind" (meaning to move at great speed) with "break wind", a euphemism for flatulence.

Originally, the CD was packaged in an 18-inch "extra-long box", as a satire against the controversial packaging policy of longboxes which was increasingly criticized as unnecessary and wasteful. The album notes are by Steely Dan's Walter Becker, who spends the entire page highlighting the Crosley Phase Linear Ionic Induction Voice Processor System and ignoring the band and music entirely.

== Backstory ==
In the film This Is Spinal Tap, David St. Hubbins (portrayed by Michael McKean) and Nigel Tufnel (portrayed by Christopher Guest) claim "All the Way Home" is the first song they wrote together, and that six years after it was written, David and Nigel recorded the song in December 1961. The film recounts the two being in different bands, David in the 'Creatures' and Nigel with the 'Lovely Lads'. Similarly, "The Sun Never Sweats" is implied to be the title track from their fictitious album of the same name, whose cover is shown on the packaging of the album This Is Spinal Tap. "Clam Caravan" is apparently a "misspelling" of "Calm Caravan".

== Track listing ==
All tracks by David St. Hubbins, Nigel Tufnel and Derek Smalls except where noted.

No.	Title	Writer(s)	Length
1.	"Bitch School"		2:50
2.	"The Majesty of Rock"		3:55
3.	"Diva Fever"		3:06
4.	"Just Begin Again" (duet with Cher)		4:52
5.	"Cash on Delivery"		3:03
6.	"The Sun Never Sweats"		4:23
7.	"Rainy Day Sun"		3:42
8.	"Break Like the Wind" ( (Note: "Break Like the Wind" samples the classical guitar piece Concierto de Aranjuez by Rodrigo.))		4:35
9.	"Stinkin' Up the Great Outdoors"		2:50
10.	"Springtime"		4:02
11.	"Clam Caravan"		3:37
12.	"Christmas with the Devil"		4:33
13.	"Now Leaving on Track 13" (hidden track (Note: "Now Leaving on Track 13" is unlisted on the album packaging.))		2:08
14.	"All the Way Home"	St. Hubbins; Tufnel	2:07

== Personnel ==
Spinal Tap

- David St. Hubbins (Michael McKean) – lead vocals and guitar
- Nigel Tufnel (Christopher Guest) – lead guitar and vocals, lead vocals on "Springtime" and "Clam Caravan"
- Derek Smalls (Harry Shearer) – bass guitar and vocals, lead vocals on "Cash on Delivery"
- Ric Shrimpton (R.J. Parnell) – drums and percussion
- C. J. Vanston – keyboards

Additional personnel

- Jeff Beck – guitar on "Break Like the Wind"
- Cher – co-lead vocals on "Just Begin Again"
- Walter Becker – liner notes
- Steve Lukather – guitar on "Just Begin Again" and "Break Like the Wind", piano on "Clam Caravan"
- Joe Satriani – guitar on "Break Like the Wind"
- Slash – guitar on "Break Like the Wind"
- Timothy B. Schmit – background vocals on "Christmas with the Devil" and "Cash On Delivery"
- Tommy Funderburk – background vocals on "Christmas with the Devil" and "Cash On Delivery"
- Waddy Wachtel – slide guitar on "Stinkin' Up the Great Outdoors"
- Dweezil Zappa – guitar solo on "Diva Fever"
- Eric "Stumpy Joe" Childs – drums on "Rainy Day Sun"
- Nicky Hopkins – keyboards on "Rainy Day Sun"
- Luis Conte – percussion on "Clam Caravan"
- David Bianco – Mix Engineer
- Danny Alonso – Mix Assistant
- John Kosh Art director and Cover Designer

Mixed at Can Am Studios

== Charts ==
Chart performance for Break Like the Wind
Chart (1992)	Peak position
Australian Albums (ARIA)	67
Canada Top Albums/CDs (RPM)	44
UK Albums (Official Charts)	51
US Billboard 200	61

== See also ==
- Spinal Tap discography
