= Spinal Tap II: The End Continues =

2025 film by Rob Reiner

- Theatrical release poster
- Directed by: Rob Reiner
- Written by: Christopher Guest; Michael McKean; Harry Shearer; Rob Reiner
- Based on: Characters by: Christopher Guest; Michael McKean; Harry Shearer; Rob Reiner
- Produced by: Rob Reiner; Michele Singer Reiner; Matthew George
- Starring: Christopher Guest; Michael McKean; Harry Shearer; Rob Reiner
- Cinematography: Lincoln Else
- Edited by: Bob Joyce
- Production company: Castle Rock Entertainment
- Distributed by: Bleecker Street (United States); Stage 6 Films (international; through Sony Pictures Releasing International)
- Release date: September 12, 2025
- Running time: 83 minutes
- Country: United States
- Language: English
- Budget: $22.6 million
- Box office: $3.2 million

Spinal Tap II: The End Continues is a 2025 American mockumentary comedy film produced and directed by Rob Reiner, from a script he wrote with Christopher Guest, Michael McKean and Harry Shearer. The sequel to This Is Spinal Tap (1984), it stars Guest, McKean, Shearer, and Reiner, and follows the members of the fictional heavy metal band Spinal Tap as they reunited for a final show.

Spinal Tap II was released on September 12, 2025, by Bleecker Street in the United States and internationally by Stage 6 Films through Sony Pictures Releasing International. It grossed $3.2 million on a $22.6 million budget. On September 30, the film debuted on digital streaming by means of premium video on demand (PVOD). As of December 15, 2025, Forbes Magazine reported that the film was number five for the top ten list for most streamed films on HBO Max. It was Reiner's final film before he and his wife were killed on December 14, 2025.

== Plot ==
Around forty years after the first film, director Marty DiBergi creates a documentary of the reunion/final show of legendary rock band Spın̈al Tap, including original members Nigel Tufnel, David St. Hubbins, and Derek Smalls. He visits Hope Faith, the daughter of Spın̈al Tap's original manager Ian Faith, and finds that she inherited a contract requiring Tap to perform one more concert. Marty reunites with Nigel, former Tap lead guitarist, who runs a cheese-and-guitar shop in the north of England with his girlfriend Moira and plays guitar in a local folk band. Marty then approaches former Tap guitarist and lead singer David, who now produces music for true-crime podcasts and on-hold phone music. His wife Jeanine has become a nun. Marty finally visits former Tap bassist Derek, who curates a glue museum and who has composed a symphonic work called "Hell Toupee". (Note: This song was recorded on his 2018 (real-world) album Smalls Change: Meditations Upon Ageing. The clip of the song featured in the film was recorded at a 2019 live concert Smalls gave in Los Angeles.) Although tension exists between Nigel and David, the trio agree to perform once more, though they will need a drummer, as all their previous drummers mysteriously died. They discuss how, although the band has not performed for 15 years, interest in their music has increased after a video of Garth Brooks and Trisha Yearwood performing Tap's "Big Bottom" went viral.

Finding a sleazy promoter, Simon Howler, who does not understand music, the band goes to New Orleans to rehearse. Their concert will fill an arena slot vacated by Stormy Daniels. Questlove, Chad Smith, and Lars Ulrich turn down requests to be Tap's drummer and auditions go badly, but eventually a spirited young rocker woman, Didi Crockett, is chosen. Keyboardist CJ "Caucasian Jerry" Vanston also comes on board. Former manager Bobbi Flekman reveals that the band stressed her so much that she became a Buddhist. Their PR man, Artie Fufkin, now sells tube men to car dealerships.

The band, now living in a "ghost house" tourist attraction, must endure being served a whole-alligator supper while tourists with "ghost meters" wander through. It is revealed that the Rock and Roll Hall of Fame rejected Tap's membership with a letter saying, "Fuck off, sincerely yours". Hope and Simon propose that Tap establish their own hall of fame, the design for which resembles an IHOP site, featuring themselves. Nigel shows Marty a cavity in his guitar for storing cheese and a grater. As the band reflects on ageing and death, Derek composes a song, "Rockin' in the Urn". Rehearsals are fraught as Nigel and David fail to connect musically. Paul McCartney drops by and offers advice, telling Marty that "Big Bottom" is "almost literature". Elton John also visits, though Simon mocks him, and he sings Tap's "Flower People" and agrees to sing "Stonehenge".

The stage manager makes a huge model of a woman's buttocks for "Big Bottom" which emits flatulent sounds and annoys the band. Didi requests that her drum platform be moved closer to the musicians. Derek makes an unsuccessful pass at Didi, who calls her girlfriend into the room. Simon tries to make Tap exercise with a personal trainer, as he wants them to dance like a K-pop boy band. Earlier, he had proposed that at least one of them could die on stage to produce a financially-valuable tribute opportunity. Simon abandons Tap, claiming he must visit his birth mother. David accuses Nigel of adultery with Jeanine, which Nigel denies.

David, frustrated, takes a walk in New Orleans and sees a bluesman singing a song which reminds him of good old days with Nigel. He tells Nigel he forgives him, although Nigel still pleads his innocence. When the concert begins the crowd cheers Tap's performance of their old hits. As "Stonehenge" begins, with Elton John at the piano, a huge stone monument descends from the ceiling and teeters precariously on the edge of Didi's relocated drum platform. Two dwarves in druid robes accidentally knock it down and it crushes the piano, Elton and the other musicians. Elton screams, "Fuck Spinal Tap!" They recover in a hospital room. Later, Derek tells Marty that he was the one who had an affair with Jeanine. As Marty congratulates Didi on being the only surviving Tap drummer, she chokes on her meal and Marty gives her the Heimlich maneuver.

== Cast ==
- Christopher Guest as Nigel Tufnel, former lead guitarist for Spinal Tap, who now runs a cheese and guitar shop in Berwick-upon-Tweed. He plays electric guitar in a local folk band using penny whistles and mandolins.
- Michael McKean as David St. Hubbins, former lead singer for Spinal Tap, who now lives in Morro Bay, California, composing music for a true crime podcast, The Trouble with Murder and on-hold phone music.
- Harry Shearer as Derek Smalls, former bass player for Spinal Tap, who now lives in London and is curator of the New Museum of Glue. He performs with a philharmonic orchestra and has composed a symphony titled Hell Toupee.
- Rob Reiner as Marty DiBergi, a documentarian who has been unable to get Hollywood work since making the first film, and now teaches at the Ed Wood School of Cinematic Arts.
- Valerie Franco as Didi Crockett, the new drummer
- CJ Vanston as Caucasian Jeff, the new keyboard player
- Kerry Godliman as Hope Faith, the daughter of Spinal Tap's original manager Ian Faith, played by Tony Hendra who died in 2021.
- June Chadwick as Jeanine Pettibone, David's ex-wife
- Fran Drescher as Bobbi Flekman
- Griffin Matthews as Peter La Pierre
- Paul Shaffer as Artie Fufkin
- Chris Addison as Simon Howler, a concert promoter.
- Kathreen Khavari as Yasmine Farangi
- Nina Conti as Moira, Nigel Tufnel's current partner
- Brad Williams as Daniel the Druid
- Wee Man as Damien the Druid
- Don Lake as Tour Guide
- John Michael Higgins as Bob Kitness
- Henry Diltz as himself, photographer for the band
- Jack Black as Supreme Hype Lord Saxaboom, stage announcer

Musicians Paul McCartney, Elton John (along with his husband, David Furnish), Garth Brooks, Trisha Yearwood, Questlove, Chad Smith, Lars Ulrich, and Little Freddie King appear as themselves.

== Production ==
=== Background ===
Following the 1984 release of This Is Spinal Tap, its creators, Harry Shearer, Christopher Guest, Michael McKean, and Rob Reiner, were embroiled in a protracted legal struggle over the film's rights and profits. In 2016, Shearer filed a lawsuit against Vivendi and its StudioCanal division, alleging "Hollywood accounting", mismanagement of trademarks and grossly inadequate earnings. He stated that he had received only $81 from merchandising and $98 from music sales over decades. The suit initially sought as much as $400 million in damages and reclaiming rights under the Copyright Act. In addition, the group sued Universal Music Group over soundtrack royalties, also citing grossly insufficient compensation. A settlement was reached in 2019.

By late 2020, after four years of litigation, it was determined that from January 1, 2021 all rights, including characters, trademarks, and licensing, would be handled by a newly formed entity, Authorized Spinal Tap LLC, wholly owned by the four creators, to restore their control over the original film and its associated intellectual property.

=== Development ===
It was announced in May 2022 that a sequel to This Is Spinal Tap was in development, with Reiner, Guest, McKean, and Shearer reprising their roles and Reiner returning as director. Reiner had deliberately avoided making sequels, but the unexpected cultural resurgence of Kate Bush through Stranger Things, combined with continuing fan interest and the cast's frustration over receiving little or no profit from the original film, caused a rethink. The death of Tony Hendra in 2021, who played Spinal Tap's original manager Ian Faith, inspired a storyline about his character having willed a contract to his daughter Hope Faith which required one last concert from the band, forcing them to reunite after 15 years of not playing together. In November 2023, Reiner announced that the musicians Paul McCartney, Elton John and Garth Brooks were set to make cameo appearances as themselves.

Filming began in New Orleans in March 2024, on a budget of $22.6 million (before tax incentives), with Questlove and Trisha Yearwood included among the cameo appearances. Fran Drescher was announced at the end of March to be reprising her role as Bobbi Flekman, with John Michael Higgins and Chris Addison among the new additions. Paul Shaffer, who played the inept promo man Artie Fufkin in the original film, was also announced as being in the cast. Like the original film, the production was only loosely scripted and largely improvised by the actors in two to three takes of each scene. Scenes were filmed with a dual digital camera setup, allowing scenes to be captured spontaneously.

Live concert footage was filmed at Stonehenge, Wiltshire, in August 2025 which was not used in the film. This footage was originally intended to be released in cinemas as the film concert Spinal Tap at Stonehenge: The Final Finale in 2026, but the project was delayed indefinitely after Reiner and his wife Michele Singer Reiner were killed in December 2025.

== Release ==
In July 2024, Reiner estimated that the film would be released in mid-2025 through Warner Bros. Pictures as a potential theatrical distributor. In March 2025, Bleecker Street announced their acquisition of U.S. rights to Spinal Tap II, now subtitled The End Continues, as well as its predecessor, with a teaser revealing a theatrical release date of September 12, 2025. In April 2025, Sony Pictures Worldwide Acquisitions, which already held international free television and Advertising Video on Demand (AVoD) syndication rights to the original, acquired all international rights to both films. The film was originally set for release in March 2024 but was delayed by the 2023 Hollywood strikes.

Spinal Tap released a fourth album, The End Continues, produced by Interscope Records, containing both new and re-recorded Spinal Tap songs featuring Elton John, Paul McCartney, Garth Brooks and Trisha Yearwood. A behind-the-scenes book about the making of the original film and sequel, A Fine Line Between Stupid and Clever: The Story of Spinal Tap, written by Reiner, Guest, McKean, and Shearer, was released on September 9.

To promote the film, an IMAX preview event, On, Off, and Around: The Record Live Event, was held on September 10 at the TCL Chinese Theatre in Los Angeles and live streamed to other IMAX theatres across the country. The event featured a live Q&A session with the cast in character.

== Reception ==
=== Critical reception ===
On the review aggregator website Rotten Tomatoes, 66% of 140 critics' reviews are positive, with an average rating of 6.2/10. The website's consensus reads: "Getting the band back together for an encore, Spinal Tap II's dry sense of humor doesn't reach the heights of the original's comedic brilliance but still hits the right nostalgia chords while wisely acting its own age." Metacritic, which uses a weighted average, assigned the film a score of 57 out of 100, based on 40 critics, indicating "mixed or average" reviews. Audiences polled by CinemaScore gave the film an average grade of "A-" on an A+ to F scale, up from the "B" earned by its predecessor.

=== Box office ===
As of September 25, 2025, Spinal Tap II: The End Continues had grossed at least $3 million at the domestic market and around $1 million internationally, making $4 million worldwide. During its first weekend, the film grossed $1.6 million at the box office. On September 30, the film debuted on digital streaming by means of premium video on demand (PVOD). The film has also been released in the digital streaming platforms of subscription video on demand (SVOD). As of December 15, 2025, Forbes reported that the film was number five in the top ten list for most streamed films on HBO Max. The revenue from the streaming services has not been reported as of yet.
