= This Is Spinal Tap =

1984 mockumentary comedy film directed by Rob Reiner

- Theatrical release poster
- Directed by: Rob Reiner
- Written by: Christopher Guest; Michael McKean; Harry Shearer; Rob Reiner
- Produced by: Karen Murphy
- Starring: Christopher Guest; Michael McKean; Harry Shearer; Rob Reiner; June Chadwick; Tony Hendra; Bruno Kirby
- Cinematography: Peter Smokler
- Edited by: Robert Leighton; Kent Beyda; Kim Secrist
- Music by: Christopher Guest; Michael McKean; Harry Shearer; Rob Reiner
- Production company: Spinal Tap Productions
- Distributed by: Embassy Pictures
- Release date: March 2, 1984
- Running time: 82 minutes
- Country: United States
- Language: English
- Budget: $2 million
- Box office: $6.1 million

This Is Spinal Tap (Note: Stylized onscreen as This Is Spın̈al Tap: A Rockumentary by Martin Di Bergi, with both a dotless letter i as well as a heavy metal umlaut over the letter n.) is a 1984 American mockumentary comedy film directed by Rob Reiner in his feature directorial debut. Christopher Guest, Michael McKean, and Harry Shearer play members of the parody heavy metal band Spinal Tap, while Reiner plays Martin "Marty" Di Bergi, a documentary filmmaker following the band on tour.

The film satirizes the behavior and musical pretensions of rock bands and hagiographic rock documentaries such as Led Zeppelin's The Song Remains the Same (1976) and the Band's The Last Waltz (1978) (as Eric Idle and Neil Innes had done for the Beatles with the Rutles). Reiner, Guest, McKean, and Shearer are credited with writing the screenplay, though most of the dialogue was improvised and dozens of hours were filmed.

This Is Spinal Tap was released by Embassy Pictures on March 2, 1984, to critical acclaim, but found only modest commercial success in theaters. Its later VHS release brought greater success and a cult following. Credited with launching the mockumentary genre, it is also notable as the origin of the idiom "up to eleven". Deemed "culturally, historically, or aesthetically significant" by the Library of Congress, it was selected for preservation in the National Film Registry in 2002. Reiner, Guest, McKean, and Shearer reprised their roles for the 2025 sequel Spinal Tap II: The End Continues; it would be Reiner's final film before he and his wife were killed on December 14, 2025.

== Plot ==
Filmmaker Martin "Marty" Di Bergi is filming a documentary about English rock band Spinal Tap's 1982 United States concert tour to promote their new album Smell the Glove. The band comprises childhood friends David St. Hubbins and Nigel Tufnel on vocals and guitar, along with bassist Derek Smalls, keyboardist Viv Savage, and drummer Mick Shrimpton.

The documentary shows Spinal Tap's early days as the skiffle group The Originals (formerly the New Originals after having discovered another band named The Originals, but having changed back when the original Originals had become The Regulars). Later, as the Thamesmen, the group had released the hit song "Gimme Some Money". They changed their name to Spinal Tap and had another hit with their flower power anthem "Listen to the Flower People"; they subsequently began performing heavy metal. The band's drummers have all followed a pattern of dying under strange circumstances: John "Stumpy" Pepys died in a "bizarre gardening accident" that the police had said was better left unsolved, Eric "Stumpy Joe" Childs died by choking on someone else's vomit, and Peter "James" Bond had exploded on stage.

Nigel shows Marty his extensive guitar collection. It includes a Fender Bass VI that is so valuable it cannot even be viewed, as well as a custom-made amplifier with volume knobs that can be turned up to the level of 11; Nigel claims that this makes it "one louder" than most other amplifiers, since their volume levels can only be turned up to 10.

Nigel's amplifier dials that have 11 as their highest volume setting. This scene is the origin of the phrase up to eleven.

Several of Spinal Tap's shows are canceled due to a lack of ticket sales, and when major retailers refuse to sell the Smell the Glove album because of its proposed sexist cover art, tensions between the band and their manager Ian Faith rise to a boiling point. David's girlfriend Jeanine, a yoga and astrology guru, joins the group on tour and she participates in band meetings. Nigel and Ian dislike Jeanine's ideas for Spinal Tap's costumes and stage presentation. Without consulting the band, the band's record label releases Smell the Glove with a plain black album cover. Despite Ian's assertion that it could have an appeal similar to that of the Beatles' White Album, Smell the Glove fails to sell.

Nigel suggests staging a lavish Druid-themed stage show and he asks Ian to order a replica Stonehenge trilithon. However, Nigel mislabels its dimensions, and the resulting prop is only 18 inches (46 cm) high rather than 18 feet (5.5 m), making the group a laughingstock. The group blames Ian, and when David suggests that Jeanine should co-manage the group, Ian quits the band. The tour continues, rescheduled for much smaller venues, and Jeanine and David increasingly marginalize Nigel.

At a show at a United States Air Force base, an equipment malfunction upsets Nigel and he quits mid-performance. The group's next gig is in an amphitheater at an amusement park, where the band is billed beneath a puppet show; the band finds that without Nigel they have a severely limited repertoire. Derek leads the band in an improvisational "Jazz Odyssey" experiment, and it is poorly received.

On the last day of the tour, David and Derek consider ending Spinal Tap and exploring other projects, such as a musical about Jack the Ripper with the title Saucy Jack. Before they go on stage, Nigel arrives and tells them that Spinal Tap's song "Sex Farm" has become a major hit in Japan and that Ian wants to arrange a tour there. David bitterly refuses; later, however, as Nigel watches the band's performance from backstage, David relents and invites Nigel onstage; this delights the crowd but it infuriates Jeanine. Mick subsequently explodes on stage. Ian is rehired as the group's manager, and Spinal Tap—now with Joe "Mama" Besser as their drummer—performs a series of sold-out shows in Japan.

== Cast ==
- Michael McKean as David St. Hubbins
- Christopher Guest as Nigel Tufnel
- Harry Shearer as Derek Smalls
- Rob Reiner as Martin "Marty" Di Bergi
- Tony Hendra as Ian Faith
- R. J. Parnell as Mick Shrimpton
- David Kaff as Viv Savage
- June Chadwick as Jeanine Pettibone
- Bruno Kirby as Limo Driver Tommy Pischedda
- Ed Begley Jr. as John "Stumpy" Pepys
- Danny Kortchmar as Ronnie Pudding
- Fran Drescher as Bobbi Flekman
- Patrick Macnee as Sir Denis Eton-Hogg
- Julie Payne as The Mime Waitress
- Dana Carvey as The Mime Waiter
- Sandy Helberg as Angelo DiMentibelio
- Zane Buzby as Rolling Stone Reporter
- Billy Crystal as Morty the Mime
- Paul Benedict as Tucker "Smitty" Brown
- Howard Hesseman as Terry Ladd (Duke Fame's Manager)
- Paul Shortino as Duke Fame
- Lara Cody as Duke Fame's groupie
- Andrew J. Lederer as Student Promoter
- Russ Kunkel as Doomed Drummer Peter "James" Bond
- Victory Tischler-Blue as Cindy
- Joyce Hyser as Belinda
- Gloria Gifford as The Airport Security Officer With The Security Wand
- Paul Shaffer as The Incompetent Promoter Artie Fufkin (Polymer Records)
- Archie Hahn as The Room Service Guy
- Charles Levin as Disc 'n' Dat Manager
- Anjelica Huston as Polly Deutsch
- Donald Kendrick as a background vocalist
- Fred Willard as Air Force Lieutenant Bob Hookstratten
- Wonderful Smith as The Janitor
- Robert Bauer as Moke, Spinal Tap's Roadie
- Fred Asparagus as Joe "Mama" Besser

== Production ==
=== Background ===
Michael McKean and Christopher Guest met while in college in New York City in the late 1960s, and they played music together. They worked with Harry Shearer and Rob Reiner on a TV pilot in 1978 for a sketch comedy show called The TV Show, which featured a parody rock band called Spinal Tap. During production of that sketch (while being burned with oil from an on-stage effect) McKean and Guest began to improvise, inventing characters that became David St. Hubbins and Nigel Tufnel.

Guest had previously played guitar under the name "Nigel Tufnel" on Michael McKean and David Lander's album Lenny and the Squigtones.

=== Development ===
The entire film was shot in and around Los Angeles over a period of about five weeks on handheld 16mm cameras beginning on November 8, 1982. The band's visit to Elvis Presley's grave was filmed in a park in Altadena, with a mock-up of the grave site. The band sings "Heartbreak Hotel" because that was the only Elvis song for which producer Karen Murphy could obtain the rights.

Rob Reiner procured $60,000 from Marble Arch Productions to write a screenplay with McKean, Guest and Shearer, based on the Spinal Tap characters. They realized after a few days of writing that no script could capture the kind of movie they wanted to make, so they decided instead to shoot a short demo of the proposed film. They shopped the demo around to various studios but had no takers, until television writer-producer Norman Lear decided to back the project, providing them with a budget of $2 million.

Virtually all dialogue in the film is improvised. Actors were given outlines indicating where scenes would begin and end and character information necessary to avoid contradictions, but everything else came from the actors. First takes were used in the final cut as often as possible in order to capture the actors' natural reactions. Reiner wanted to list the entire cast as writers on the film to acknowledge their contributions, but the Writers Guild of America objected, and so only he, Guest, McKean, and Shearer received writing credit.

Veteran documentary cameraman Peter Smokler worked as cinematographer on the film. Smokler had great instincts for camera placement on set, according to Reiner, and is responsible for the film's handheld cinéma vérité style, although the cinematographer did not understand what was supposed to be funny about the movie. The film was shot like a documentary, without a script or traditional shooting schedule. So much footage was filmed (over 100 hours) that it took three editors to complete the film.

Inspirations for the film included the documentaries Dont Look Back (1967), which follows Bob Dylan's 1965 tour of England, and Martin Scorsese's The Last Waltz (1978), which was about a 1976 concert by The Band billed as the group's farewell. The scene where Spinal Tap becomes lost backstage was inspired by a video of Tom Petty at a venue in Germany, walking through a series of doors trying to find the stage, but ending up on an indoor tennis court. Rob Reiner also went to see the English heavy metal band Judas Priest in concert as part of his preparation for the film. He later said, "It physically hurt my chest. The reverberation in the hall was so strong that I couldn't stay there any longer." According to Harry Shearer in the film's Criterion Collection DVD commentary, keyboard player John Sinclair had just returned from touring with Uriah Heep when principal photography was about to begin, and told them how the band had been booked to play at an Air Force base. They subsequently used the story in the film.

In post-production, Christopher Guest was very concerned with the verisimilitude of the finger positions on the band's instruments during the concert scenes, and even re-shot some footage after the movie was edited to ensure their hands appeared in sync with the music.

The character of Jeanine, David's disruptive girlfriend, was added during the production to provide a storyline to the material—in part to mollify studio executives who worried the movie would be plotless. Actress Victoria Tennant was briefly considered for the role, but June Chadwick won the part, thanks to her chemistry with the cast and her improvisational skills.

Robert Bauer played the same character, Moke, in another Reiner movie, The Sure Thing (1985).

== Reception and legacy ==
=== Contemporaneous reviews ===
At the time of its release, Roger Ebert of the Chicago Sun-Times gave the film four out of four stars and wrote "This Is Spinal Tap is one of the funniest, most intelligent, most original films of the year. The satire has a deft, wicked touch. Spinal Tap is not that much worse than, not that much different from, some successful rock bands." Ebert later placed the film on his ten best list of 1984 and would later include it in his Great Movies list in 2001 where he called it "one of the funniest movies ever made". Gene Siskel of the Chicago Tribune also awarded it four out of four stars: "It is so well done, in fact, that unless you are clued in beforehand, it might take you a while to realize that the rock group under dissection in This Is Spinal Tap does not really exist." Janet Maslin of The New York Times praised it as "a witty, mischievous satire" and "obviously a labor of love."

Critics praised the film not only for its satire of the lifestyles of rock stars but also for its take on the non-fiction film genre. David Ansen of Newsweek called the film "a satire of the documentary form itself, complete with perfectly faded clips from old TV shows of the band in its mod and flower-child incarnations".

Even with cameos from Anjelica Huston, Billy Crystal and Patrick Macnee, Spinal Tap still managed to trick many of its moviegoers into believing the band existed. Reiner observed that "when Spinal Tap initially came out, everybody thought it was a real band... the reason it did go over everybody's head was that it was very close to home".

Audiences polled by CinemaScore gave the film an average grade of "B" on an A+ to F scale.

=== Retrospective assessment ===
This Is Spinal Tap is widely regarded as one of the best films of 1984. The film holds a 98% approval rating on the review aggregation website Rotten Tomatoes based on 177 reviews. The site's critical consensus reads, "Smartly directed, brilliantly acted, and packed with endlessly quotable moments, This Is Spinal Tap is an all-time comedy classic." Metacritic, which uses a weighted average, assigned the film a score of 92 out of 100, based on 30 critics, indicating "universal acclaim".

In 2002, This Is Spinal Tap was deemed "culturally, historically, or aesthetically significant" by the Library of Congress and was selected for preservation in the United States National Film Registry.

In 2000, the American Film Institute placed the film at number 29 in its 100 Years...100 Laughs list. In 2008, Empire magazine ranked This Is Spinal Tap number 48 on its list of The 500 Greatest Movies of All Time. The New York Times placed the film on their list of The Best 1,000 Movies Ever Made. In January 2010, Total Film placed This Is Spinal Tap on its list of The 100 Greatest Movies of All Time. When Entertainment Weekly compiled their list of The 100 Greatest Movies of All Time, the publication included the film as "just too beloved to ignore". In 2011, Time Out London named it the best comedy film of all time. In November 2015, the film was ranked the 11th funniest screenplay by the Writers Guild of America in its list of 101 Funniest Screenplays. Stephen Sondheim, Rowan Atkinson, Dan Stevens, Michael Apted, Chris Parnell, John Bradley and Sacha Gervasi listed it among their favorite films of all time.

=== Reactions from musicians ===
Cover for Shark Sandwich, one of the band's fictional albums

The film resonated with many musicians. Jimmy Page, Robert Plant, Jerry Cantrell, Dee Snider and Ozzy Osbourne all reported that, like Spinal Tap, they had become lost in confusing arena backstage hallways trying to make their way to the stage. When Dokken's George Lynch saw the film he is said to have exclaimed, "That's us! How'd they make a movie about us?" Glenn Danzig had a similar reaction when comparing Spinal Tap to his former band the Misfits saying, "When I first saw Spinal Tap, I was like, 'Hey, this is my old band.'"

Lars Ulrich told a press conference crowd that the 1992 Guns N' Roses/Metallica Stadium Tour seemed "so Spinal Tap". This tour was in support of Metallica's own "black album". Shortly after the tour started, Metallica's James Hetfield suffered third-degree burns on his arms after he stood too close to a pyrotechnic device. Earlier in that tour, backstage at The Freddie Mercury Tribute Concert, Metallica met with Spinal Tap and discussed how their "black album" was a homage to Spinal Tap's Smell the Glove. This was captured on the Metallica DVD A Year and a Half in the Life of Metallica.

In a 1992 interview, Nirvana explained declining an offer to be part of the film Singles. Kurt Cobain goes on to say, "There's never really been a good documentary on rock and roll bands." Dave Grohl then cuts in saying, "Except for Spinal Tap, [that] was the only rock movie worth watching," which Cobain agreed with, as well as mentioning Dont Look Back, by D.A. Pennebaker.

According to a 1997 interview in Spin magazine with Aerosmith rhythm guitarist Brad Whitford, "The first time Steven [Tyler] saw it he didn't see any humor in it." When the film was released, Aerosmith's then-latest album, Rock in a Hard Place, depicted Stonehenge prominently on the cover.

U2 guitarist The Edge said in the documentary It Might Get Loud that when he first saw Spinal Tap, "I didn't laugh: I wept," because it summed up what a brainless swamp big-label rock music had become.

In a 2023 interview Chris Frantz of Talking Heads said "we watched Spinal Tap and I thought, ohh, I can never take myself seriously again."

=== Use of Spinal Tap as a descriptive term ===
It became a common insult for a pretentious band to be told they were funnier than Spinal Tap. As George Lynch put it, the more seriously a band took themselves, the more they resembled Spinal Tap. After seeing a 1986 performance by metal band Venom, singer Henry Rollins compared them to Spinal Tap. In their respective Behind the Music episodes, Quiet Riot's Rudy Sarzo and Ratt's Robbin Crosby compared their own bands to Spinal Tap to some extent. For example, as a parallel to the "Shit Sandwich" incident, Quiet Riot's fourth album Condition Critical was given the two-word review of "Prognosis: Terminal" by J. D. Considine in Musician magazine. His review of the short-lived band GTR's eponymous debut LP in the same magazine was "SHT". R.E.M.'s Mike Mills described the band's early tours as "very Spinal Tap", citing, among other things, they had played at a United States Air Force base. Conversely, Taipei Times journalist Julien Oeuillet praised the wholesome attitude of Taiwanese rock band Elephant Gym by describing a documentary about them as "feel[ing] like the opposite of Spinal Tap".

Judas Priest, the heavy metal band that Rob Reiner saw in preparation for the film, has had many drummers in its career (eight in total), which the website Ultimate Classic Rock described as "positively Spinal Tap-worthy". Marillion guitarist Steve Rothery later described the run of five drummers in a year between his band's first two albums as "like Spinal Tap". In the Pearl Jam documentary Pearl Jam Twenty, the members jokingly refer to the fact that while the core lineup of the group has remained unchanged (singer Eddie Vedder, guitarists Mike McCready and Stone Gossard, and bassist Jeff Ament), the band has had five drummers. They describe this as "very Spinal Tap of us". In the documentary, a mock silent film called The Drummer Story is shown explaining what happened to their previous drummers. In it, one of them is almost eaten by a sea monster, only to be rescued by Vedder, playing a lifeguard.

The Canadian heavy metal band Anvil, whose drummer is named Robb Reiner, have been called "the real Spinal Tap" based on the misadventures depicted in their documentary Anvil! The Story of Anvil.

== Lawsuit ==
On October 17, 2016, Harry Shearer filed a $125 million fraud and breach of contract lawsuit against both StudioCanal, which owns the film's rights, and Vivendi, which owns the studio. Shearer claimed that he and the other co-stars of the film received only $179 for sales of merchandise and music over the prior three decades. Shearer's lawsuit was specifically directed at StudioCanal by ordering the studio to terminate the copyright to This Is Spinal Tap. In February 2017, Shearer's co-stars Christopher Guest and Michael McKean, as well as the film's director Rob Reiner, joined the lawsuit against StudioCanal and Vivendi, seeking $400 million in damages. In the same month, Vivendi made an attempt to move the court to dismiss the case. In September 2017, a judge dismissed Shearer, Reiner and McKean from the case. In October 2017, Spinal Tap revised their case by adding Universal Music Group (UMG, another division of Vivendi, whose Polydor label released the film's soundtrack) as a defendant, as well as the right to reclaim their copyrights to the film, its songs and characters.

In August 2018, another judge ruled that Guest, Reiner, McKean and Shearer could pursue the fraud claim against Vivendi.

The case related to sales of the soundtrack was settled out of court by November 2019, with UMG retaining the distribution rights but with the music rights eventually returning to Shearer, Guest, and McKean in the future. A settlement between Vivendi, StudioCanal, and the cast on the merchandising aspect was reached in September 2020 with final details to be resolved in the following months.

== Home media ==
This Is Spinal Tap was first released on VHS in 1984 by Embassy Home Entertainment, and in 1994 as part of the Criterion Collection on LaserDisc under the title This Is Spinal Tap: Special Edition. It has also been released twice on DVD.

The first DVD release was a 1998 Criterion edition in letterbox format which used supplemental material from the 1994 Criterion LaserDisc release. It is the only double sided DVD in their catalogue, and it is now out of print. It included an audio commentary track with Christopher Guest, Michael McKean and Harry Shearer; a second audio commentary track with Rob Reiner, Karen Murphy, Robert Leighton and Kent Beyda; 79 minutes of deleted scenes; Spinal Tap: The Final Tour, the original twenty-minute short they shot to pitch the film; two trailers that feature Rob Reiner showing a film about cheese rolling (because "Spinal Tap" itself was still in the editing room); a TV promo, Heavy Metal Memories; and a music video for "Hell Hole". Sales of this edition were discontinued after only two years and the DVD has become a valuable collector's item. Much of this material had appeared on a 1994 CD-ROM by The Voyager Company that included the entire film in QuickTime format.

In 2000, MGM Home Entertainment released a special edition with more or less the same extras from the Criterion edition, plus a new audio commentary track with Guest, McKean and Shearer performing in character throughout, commenting on the film entirely in their fictional alter-egos, and often disapproving of how the film presents them; 70 minutes of deleted scenes (some of which were not on the Criterion DVD); a new short, Catching Up with Marty Di Bergi (where it is revealed that the members of Spinal Tap were very disappointed in Di Bergi for making a "hatchet job" of their film); the Heavy Metal Memories promo and six additional TV promos; music videos for "Gimme Some Money", "Listen to the Flower People" and "Big Bottom"; and segments of Spinal Tap appearing on The Joe Franklin Show. The special features were produced by Automat Pictures. However, this version of the film was missing the subtitles that appear throughout the film (for example, introducing band members, other personnel, and location names) and did not include the commentaries from the Criterion edition. The MGM DVD is missing the subtitles burned into the film; they have been replaced with player generated subtitles.

Sometime in the 2000s, a workprint version of the film was uploaded online. This version is 270 minutes long. It includes many scenes never released in any home media release.

A 25th anniversary Blu-ray was released on July 28, 2009. It includes all bonus features from the MGM DVD, plus an interview with Nigel about Stonehenge, as well as the performance of "Stonehenge" from the band's Live Earth performance. It does not include the commentaries from the Criterion Collection DVD, even though MGM had stated that they would be included in the earliest press release for the Blu-ray version (most likely due to legal issues) and does not feature a "create your own avatars" element teased in publicity. However, this version does restore the subtitles that introduce band members/locales/events/etc. that were missing from MGM's DVD. The alternative, Region B, UK edition of this version additionally features a new hour-long documentary featuring famous fans, the "Bitch School" promo, the EPK for the "Back from the Dead" album, an interview with the late Reg Presley discussing the influence of the Troggs tapes on the film, and the first hour (ending with an abrupt edit) of The Return of Spinal Tap. It does however lose the Di Bergi short and the Joe Franklin clip.

The Criterion Collection, under exclusive license from MGM, released the film on Ultra HD Blu-ray and a remastered Blu-ray on September 15, 2025, based on a 4K restoration of the film. This is the first release of the film since Criterion's DVD release to include the two crew commentary tracks; these never appeared on any non-Criterion release of the movie.

Concurrent with the announcement of Spinal Tap II, the sequel's distributor Bleecker Street would acquire all domestic distribution rights for the first film from Castle Rock Entertainment and CAA Media Finance in March 2025, with the company hosting all distribution going forward, including home media. Sony Pictures Worldwide Acquisitions picked up all media rights for rest of world including Canada for the 41st anniversary re-release of the film. This acquisition gave Sony to handle the rights to the film since they own television distribution rights of many Embassy titles.

== Appearances in other media ==
Harry Shearer went on to become one of the main voice actors on The Simpsons, providing voices for characters including Principal Skinner, Mr. Burns, Waylon Smithers, and Ned Flanders. The members of Spinal Tap reprised their roles in "The Otto Show", first playing on a concert attended by Bart and Milhouse which escalates into a riot after the band's early exit, then having their tour bus run off the road by Otto in the school bus.

The Internet Movie Database normally allows users to rate films only up to ten stars, but specifically for Spinal Tap, the site allows users to rate the film eleven stars, referring to the "Up to eleven" scene. On IGN, This Is Spinal Tap was the only DVD—and seemingly the only thing reviewed on IGN—to get 11 out of 10. This scene was also used in some news reports on the death of James Charles "Jim" Marshall, founder of the famous amplifier company whose equipment is featured in the scene. Richard D. Titus, UX&D Controller for the BBC, adopted a Spinal Tap-inspired suggestion from a colleague that the BBC iPlayer should have a volume control that goes to eleven. The term has entered the vernacular, as with an autistic's description of sensory overload vis-à-vis a neurotypical's routine filtering.

Fran Drescher reprised the role of Bobbi Flekman in the fifth season episode "The Bobbi Flekman Story" of the sitcom The Nanny, in which she starred. In the episode, Flekman is now a record label producer for The Brian Setzer Orchestra, and an ex-business partner of character Maxwell Sheffield (Charles Shaughnessy). Drescher's regular character Fran Fine believes Flekman is attempting to seduce Sheffield and impersonates her to stop it.

J. K. Rowling cited Spinal Tap's series of drummers as an inspiration for the Harry Potter series, in which something bad happens to every teacher of "Defence Against The Dark Arts" at Hogwarts, causing them all to leave the position without ever completing a full school year.

A biographical comic book was released in 2018, That Was Spinal Tap, telling both the fictional story of the band and the real-life tale of the actors and others who created the characters and music. It was scripted by Rock 'N' Roll Comics co-creator Jay Allen Sanford.

== Sequels ==
=== The Return of Spinal Tap ===
A sequel, The Return of Spinal Tap, was broadcast and released on video in 1992 to promote Break Like the Wind. It consists mostly of footage from an actual Spinal Tap concert at the Royal Albert Hall. In it, the "Stonehenge" joke from the original movie is referenced, as the new, large prop is too big to get into the venue. The piece also includes interview footage with band members, who discuss their lives between the time of filming This Is Spinal Tap and The Return of Spinal Tap. The band had broken up and gone their separate ways, before reuniting for the Albert Hall gig. David was living in California with Janine, where they operated a new age boutique (one of their customers being Graham Nash), and David also volunteered for the parks department. Derek had joined the Christian rock band Lambsblood for a few years but was now working with his father's telephone sanitizing business in England. Nigel also lived in England and tinkered as an inventor; his then-current project (as yet unperfected) was a folding wine glass. McKean, Shearer, and Guest were also briefly seen playing their 1960s folk-spoof band The Folksmen in this sequel.

=== Spinal Tap II: The End Continues ===
In May 2022, director Rob Reiner announced that he was working on a sequel to the film, which would include him returning to play DiBergi, and McKean, Shearer, and Guest as the members of Spinal Tap. Cameos included Elton John, Paul McCartney, Garth Brooks, Questlove and Trisha Yearwood.

The film is Castle Rock Entertainment's first film following its revival in 2021. Filming started in February 2024, with Bleecker Street acquiring distribution rights in March 2025 and setting a September theatrical release for the film. Bleecker Street, having also acquired the original film's distribution rights, would also immediately set a "41st Anniversary" theatrical re-release for that July as a promotional campaign for the sequel.

== Related works ==
- "Christmas with the Devil", 1984 follow-up single.
- Inside Spinal Tap (1985), a rare companion book by Peter Occhiogrosso. In 1992 this was revised and expanded exclusively for the UK market.
- Both Michael McKean and Harry Shearer appeared in character as David St. Hubbins and Derek Smalls (and were credited under those character names) as part of the all-star charity group Hear 'n Aid. The group issued the single "Stars" in early 1986 which charted in the UK, hitting #26. St. Hubbins and Smalls were two of the dozens of well-known heavy metal artists who participated and were credited on the record, and can be seen in the video.
- Break Like the Wind (1992), Spinal Tap album.
- "The Otto Show", a 1992 episode of The Simpsons which features Spinal Tap.
- This Is Spinal Tap: The Official Companion (ISBN 0-7475-4218-X) was published in 2000. It featured a "Tapistory", full transcript of the film (including outtakes), a discography, lyrics and an A–Z of the band. This book largely recycles material from the Peter Occhiogrosso book and Criterion DVD commentaries.
- Back from the Dead, 2009 album and DVD.
- Unplugged and Unwigged, 2009 live DVD of Guest, McKean, and Shearer performing songs from their various works.
- Smalls Change (Meditations on Ageing), 2018 solo album by Shearer as Derek Smalls. One track is co-written by "David St. Hubbins".

== See also ==
- The Rutles, parody of the Beatles (1978)
- Bad News, fictional heavy metal band (1983–1988)
- The Big Picture (1989)
- CB4 (1993)
- Fear of a Black Hat (1994)
- Waiting for Guffman (1996)
- A Mighty Wind (2003)
- Best in Show (2000)
- Get Ready to Be Boyzvoiced (2000)
- For Your Consideration (2006)
- Walk Hard: The Dewey Cox Story (2007)
- Popstar: Never Stop Never Stopping (2016)
