= Spinal Tap (band) =

Parody heavy metal band

- Derek Smalls (Harry Shearer), Nigel Tufnel (Christopher Guest) and David St. Hubbins (Michael McKean)

Background information
- Also known as: The Originals, the New Originals, the Thamesmen
- Origin: Fictional: England; Actual: United States
- Genres: Comedy rock; heavy metal; hard rock; glam metal
- Years active: Fictional: 1964–1984; 1991–1992; 2001; 2007; 2009; 2025; Actual: 1979–1984; 1991–1992; 2001; 2007; 2009; 2019; 2025–present
- Labels: Fictional: Polymer; Megaphone; Actual: Polydor; MCA; Interscope
- Members: David St. Hubbins (Michael McKean); Nigel Tufnel (Christopher Guest); Derek Smalls (Harry Shearer)

Spinal Tap (stylized as Spın̈al Tap) are a parody English heavy metal band created by the American comedians and musicians Michael McKean, Christopher Guest and Harry Shearer. McKean plays the singer and rhythm guitarist David St. Hubbins, Guest plays the lead guitarist Nigel Tufnel, and Shearer plays the bassist Derek Smalls. They are characterized as "one of England's loudest bands".

Spinal Tap first appeared on the 1979 ABC television sketch comedy pilot The T.V. Show, starring Rob Reiner. The sketch, actually a mock promotional video for the song "Rock and Roll Nightmare", was written by Reiner and the band, and included the songwriter-performer Loudon Wainwright III on keyboards. The band starred in the 1984 mockumentary film This Is Spinal Tap and its 2025 sequel Spinal Tap II: The End Continues. They have released four albums: This Is Spinal Tap (1984), the soundtrack of the original film; Break Like the Wind (1992); Back from the Dead (2009); and The End Continues (2025), the soundtrack of the sequel film.

The actors have performed in character at concerts and released music under the Spinal Tap name. They toured in the United States in April and May 2009 and performed as Spinal Tap in a "One Night Only World Tour" on June 30, 2009, at Wembley Arena in London, three days after playing the Glastonbury Festival.

The trio also portray the fictional American folk music revival band the Folksmen; some Spinal Tap concert appearances have featured Guest, McKean and Shearer opening for Spinal Tap as the Folksmen.

== History ==
=== Fictional history ===
Fans of Spinal Tap have assembled details about the band based on fictional film, albums, concerts and related promotional material, including a discography and a list of the band's former members. Within the context of the band's fictional history, Spinal Tap began as a beat group called the Thamesmen in 1964 and released one single, "Gimmie Some Money" with "Cups and Cakes" on the B-side, in 1965. They changed their name to Spinal Tap in 1966 and became a psychedelic pop band, before reinventing themselves as a heavy metal band in the early 1970s, the style for which they are best known. Over the years the band has also performed progressive rock, jazz fusion, funk and reggae. They have also been classified as hard rock, glam metal and rock and roll.

Spinal Tap's fictional history documents a succession of drummers, all of whom are said to have died in strange circumstances: one in a "bizarre gardening accident"; another who "choked on vomit", but possibly not his own vomit; and two from "spontaneous human combustion" onstage. Additionally, it is claimed that police described the "bizarre gardening accident" as a mystery "best left unsolved".

=== Real history ===
McKean and Shearer had previously been members of the Credibility Gap, a comedy troupe that did both spoken word and musical comedy, and had released a mini rock opera and at least one musical 7-inch single.

In 1979, Guest and McKean were members of Lenny and the Squigtones, a band that was fronted by characters from the hit television series Laverne & Shirley. Guest, on guitar and clarinet, was credited as "Nigel Tufnel", the name he would eventually use as a member of Spinal Tap. He also used this name when the band appeared on American Bandstand.

Spinal Tap themselves first appeared in a video that aired as part of a 1979 sketch comedy special called The T.V. Show, a project spearheaded by Rob Reiner. The video is for the song "Rock 'N' Roll Nightmare" in a sequence that is a spoof of The Midnight Special. Michael McKean (as David St. Hubbins), Christopher Guest (as Nigel Tufnel), Harry Shearer (as Derek Smalls), Loudon Wainwright III, and Russ Kunkel appear in the video. The segment is introduced by Reiner in character as Wolfman Jack.

The appearance on The T.V. Show eventually led to the creation of a film, Spinal Tap: The Final Tour, tracing a disastrous tour undertaken by the aging British metal band Spinal Tap. Reiner appears as filmmaker Marty DiBergi, while Guest, McKean and Shearer returned as their characters, having further developed their Spinal Tap personas, whose names appear on-screen for the first time. Also added to the group were David Kaff (as keyboard player Viv Savage) and R.J. Parnell (as drummer Mick Shrimpton). Parnell had previously been in the band Atomic Rooster, while Kaff had been a member of Rare Bird. The quintet played their own instruments throughout the film.

The band played three live performances in October 1982 in preparation for making This Is Spinal Tap, at Gazzarri's (as the support act for Iron Butterfly) and The Central in West Hollywood, and the Golden Bear in Huntington Beach.

The band Spinal Tap became a going concern, with the group (in character) playing gigs and appearing on a 1984 episode of Saturday Night Live to promote the film. The character of Mick Shrimpton having died in the film, Parnell played his twin brother drummer Ric Shrimpton for these and later appearances. Kaff dropped out shortly after the Saturday Night Live appearance.

In 1984, the band (Guest, McKean, Shearer and Parnell) issued the single "Christmas with the Devil".

In 1985, McKean and Shearer (in character and credited as David St. Hubbins and Derek Smalls) participated in the all-star charity recording "Stars" by Hear 'n Aid. They both sing on the record, and are seen in character in the behind-the-scenes "Making of" video.

==== Reunion and recent history ====
The group reformed on January 18, 1991, for a performance at the Disneyland Hotel that included new material. This featured on the 1992 release, Break Like the Wind, an album produced in part by T Bone Burnett.

Several publicity stunts were staged surrounding the new album. An advertisement was placed in Music Connection, HITS and The Hollywood Reporter saying "DRUMMER DIED, need new one. Must have no immediate family. Auditions October 31 at LA Coliseum with David St. Hubbins, Nigel Tufnel, Derek Smalls."

The "auditions" for a new drummer were held at the Los Angeles Memorial Coliseum on October 31, 1991. They were attended by a few hundred real aspirants, and by Stephen Perkins of Jane's Addiction, Gina Schock of the Go-Go's, Debbi Peterson of the Bangles, Micky Dolenz of the Monkees, and Mick Fleetwood of Fleetwood Mac, who auditioned in a fireproof suit. Parnell was retained as "Ric Shrimpton" and remained the band's drummer. Kaff did not return, and consequently the "reunited" band consisted of Guest, McKean, Shearer and Parnell (all in character) and new keyboardist C. J. Vanston (under his own name). A promotional concert tour followed, which included an appearance at The Freddie Mercury Tribute Concert, where they performed "The Majesty of Rock", a song they dedicated to Mercury.

The band also released the single "Bitch School," which became a genuine chart single in the UK, as did follow-up single "The Majesty of Rock".

The band also appeared on The Simpsons in the episode "The Otto Show", which aired in the United States on April 23, 1992. The episode was written by Jeff Martin and directed by Wes Archer. Harry Shearer, who is a regular Simpsons cast member, reprised his role as Derek Smalls. In a 2001 interview with the San Francisco Chronicle, Harry Shearer, speaking in character as Derek Smalls, suggested that within the fictional universe of Spın̈al Tap, the bands appearance on The Simpsons represented the band making a cameo on the cartoon, rather than the events of the cartoon having actually occurred.

On July 1, 1992, Spinal Tap crossed five time zones for three performances in St. John's, Newfoundland; Barrie, Ontario; and Vancouver, British Columbia, for MuchMusic and Molson's Great Canadian Party. For each performance of "Stonehenge", the miniature monument prop was delivered on stage in a courier envelope.

Parnell dropped out of the group in the 1990s, leaving Spinal Tap to use session-drummers.

In 2000, the band launched a web site named "Tapster", where their song "Back from the Dead" was made available for download. Tapster was a parody of Napster, a peer-to-peer file sharing network.

In 2001, the band "reunited" for the nine-city "Back from the Dead Tour" that began on June 1, 2001, at the Greek Theater in Los Angeles. The tour included a show at Carnegie Hall in New York City and ended in Montreal in mid-July at the Just for Laughs festival. The opening act for some of these shows were the Folksmen, the folk trio seen in the film A Mighty Wind, and also performed by Guest, McKean, and Shearer.

In 2007, Tap reunited again, this time to help combat global warming. "They're not that environmentally conscious, but they've heard of global warming," said Marty DeBergi (portrayed by Reiner). "Nigel thought it was just because he was wearing too much clothing – that if he just took his jacket off it would be cooler." This reunion also included the release of a new song called "Warmer Than Hell". The band played on the London leg of the SOS/Live Earth concert series, and Rob Reiner has directed a short film (entitled Spinal Tap) which was released on the Live Earth website on April 27. The film reveals that Nigel Tufnel is now working as a farmhand looking after miniature horses. He plans to race them. David St. Hubbins is currently working as a hip-hop producer, and Derek Smalls is in rehab for being addicted to the Internet.

A new album, Back from the Dead, was released on June 16, 2009. The album consists mostly of re-recordings of songs from the original film's soundtrack, along with some new, previously unrecorded numbers. The album was nominated for Best Comedy Album and Best Recording Package at the 52nd Annual Grammy Awards.

On April 6, 2009, the band announced a one-date "world tour," performing at London's Wembley Arena on June 30, 2009. Support on this night came from the Folksmen. The band unexpectedly also self-confirmed for Glastonbury Festival 2009 during an online interview on May 8, 2009, in the Philadelphia Daily News following a "Unwigged and Unplugged" show in the city.

In 2018, Shearer released an album in the persona of Spinal Tap bassist Derek Smalls. The single "It Don't Get Old" was, as per the credits, co-written by David St. Hubbins. On 27 April 2019, the band reunited at the 2019 Tribeca Film Festival for the 35th anniversary of the film. In May 2022, it was announced that the principal cast and director of the original movie were reuniting for Spinal Tap II: The End Continues, a sequel planned for release by Castle Rock Entertainment on September 11, 2025. Filming began in New Orleans in March 2024. Kaff died in July 2025.

A third and final Spinal Tap film, titled Spinal Tap at Stonehenge: The Final Finale, was planned to be released in 2026. The film was set to use concert footage which was shot at Stonehenge in August 2025, with Bleecker Street acquiring the rights to release the planned concert film in the United States in October 2025. However, as a result of the murder of director Rob Reiner and his wife Michelle in December 2025, plans to release the film have been put on pause.

=== Other appearances ===
The band appeared as the musical guests on an episode of Saturday Night Live (SNL) in the spring of 1984. Barry Bostwick was the host. At this time, producer Dick Ebersol approached Shearer, Guest and McKean to join the cast. Shearer and Guest accepted (McKean would not join until ten years later, by which time original producer Lorne Michaels was back at the show's helm). Shearer's stint on SNL the following season—his second, the first having been the 1979–80 season—was to be short-lived, following creative disputes with the show's management.

In 1985, at the invitation of Ronnie James Dio, Michael McKean and Harry Shearer took part in the heavy metal benefit project Hear 'n Aid, to raise money for famine victims in Ethiopia. McKean and Shearer attended the event in character as David St. Hubbins and Derek Smalls, appearing in the behind-the-scenes videos and interacting in character with many real-life metal stars, many of whom were huge fans of Spinal Tap. "David St. Hubbins" and "Derek Smalls" are part of the vocal chorus heard on the record (and seen in the video), and are credited under those names on the Hear 'n Aid single's front cover (alongside many real-life heavy metal stars). The ad hoc supergroup's single "Stars" rose to No. 26 on the UK charts in May 1986.

As part of the promotion surrounding Break Like the Wind, Spinal Tap was portrayed in "The Otto Show" episode of the animated series The Simpsons, for which Shearer is a principal voice actor. The Simpsons follows the approach of the original film by presenting the group as if they were a real group. During the disastrous performance, a massive devil balloon on the stage does not inflate properly, and Nigel is temporarily blinded by lasers. Later in the episode, their tour bus is accidentally pushed off a cliff due to Otto's reckless driving. In a 2016 interview Shearer said this was the only time Spinal Tap had worked to a script, all other movie, television and live appearances being improvised.

On July 1, 1992, as part of MuchMusic's Canada Day "Great Canadian Party" festival, Spinal Tap completed an unprecedented tour of Canada in less than 24 hours. Jetting across five time-zones, the band played St. John's, Newfoundland, Barrie, Ontario, and Vancouver, British Columbia. That evening, during a performance of "Stonehenge", Tap received their signature, triptych set-piece via Canada Post in a small, bubble-wrap envelope that Derek Smalls signed for onstage. Bemused, Smalls tore open the packaging, and revealed to the cheering crowd the prop which looked to be half the size of the original 18 inch Stonehenge rock from the film.

In 1993, Nigel Tufnel appeared in the rockumentary Joe Satriani: The Satch Tapes.

In 1994, The Return of Spinal Tap was released on video; most of this is live material from a 1992 performance at the Royal Albert Hall where the Stonehenge set was shown to the audience on video as being too big to fit through the stage doors, but it also includes some interviews and follow-up on the band members.

In 2000, while promoting Tapster.com, Spinal Tap appeared and performed on the short-lived series VH1 The List (with Mick Fleetwood on drums) and appeared on the Late Show.

On January 19, 2001, Spinal Tap played a "one night only" tour at the Hilton ballroom in Anaheim, CA. This was during the annual NAMM Show, and sponsored by Shure. Free earplugs were provided, "Stonehenge" was performed (with small dancers), and tour T-shirts were available the next day at Shure's tradeshow booth. The shirt showed several concert dates, but they were all marked cancelled - except the Jan 19 date.

In 2006, Nigel Tufnel appeared in a Volkswagen TV commercial highlighting their offer of a free, exclusive First Act guitar with the purchase of qualifying automobiles. The guitar features knobs and inlays with the Volkswagen logo and pre-amps that allow it to be played through the car's stereo system. Also in 2006, the song "Gimme Some Money" was used in a TV commercial for Open from American Express, "Tonight I'm Gonna Rock You Tonight" appeared in Harmonix's video game Guitar Hero II and "Christmas with the Devil" appeared in BBC One promo spots for the network's Christmas program.

In 2007, while accepting an award from the BBC Two program The Culture Show, Christopher Guest broke into Nigel Tufnel, and considered what his wife and kids would make of the Mark Kermode-shaped award.

On July 7, 2007, Spinal Tap played at Wembley Stadium in London along with many major bands and groups as part of Live Earth, a climate change awareness concert. Their set included a new song written for the occasion, "Warmer Than Hell". During their final number, the song "Big Bottom", St. Hubbins and Tufnel both picked up basses. Spinal Tap was also joined by "every bass player in the known universe", including Nate Mendel (of the Foo Fighters); Robert Trujillo, Kirk Hammett, and James Hetfield (Metallica); Gordon Moakes (Bloc Party); and Adam Yauch (MCA of the Beastie Boys). They were also joined on back-up vocals by Annette O'Toole, Michael McKean's wife.

In May 2008, Nigel Tufnel appeared in the National Geographic show Stonehenge Decoded, expounding his nonsensical theories about Stonehenge and who was responsible for building it. His claims to have invented "decoder" experiments capable of unveiling the true purpose of the monument are, as yet, unproven.

McKean, Guest and Shearer have made several appearances as their alter egos the Folksmen, including the television shows Saturday Night Live and Mad TV and the film The Return of Spinal Tap.

On March 2, 2009, Guest, McKean and Shearer held a press conference at the House of Blues in Los Angeles to announce their forthcoming album of new and old Spinal Tap songs, plus a 2009 "Unwigged & Unplugged" tour to celebrate the 25th anniversary of the film, This Is Spinal Tap. According to an L.A. Weekly report, when MTV News' Kurt Loder asked the trio if they had plans beyond an album and tour, Shearer answered, "We're gonna bomb Iran." The tour also features songs from the Folksmen and others from throughout the trio's career.

On April 1, 2009, Guest, McKean, and Shearer played on The Tonight Show with Jay Leno as the musical guest.

On June 15, 2009, Spinal Tap performed on The Tonight Show with Conan O'Brien as the musical guest.

On June 27, 2009, Spinal Tap performed on the main stage at the Glastonbury Festival with Jarvis Cocker guesting on bass during "Big Bottom", and also inviting Jamie Cullum on stage to play keyboards. One of the unexpected highlights for Tap fans was a rendition of the newly written overture from the mythical Jack the Ripper musical Saucy Jack. Also on the bill were Kasabian, Crosby, Stills & Nash, and Bruce Springsteen.

On June 30, 2009, Spinal Tap performed at Wembley Arena with the Folksmen as support. A variety of special guests featured including Keith Emerson (joined them on organ/keyboards – which he later destroyed during the show) and Justin Hawkins from the Darkness.

On July 27, 2009, the band performed on Late Night with Jimmy Fallon as the musical guest, announcing their retirement and shortly thereafter their comeback. The next day, July 28, they were the musical guest on The Daily Show.

On August 25, 2009, Spinal Tap released a seven-minute short film titled Stonehenge: 'Tis a Magical Place celebrating their 25th anniversary. The video is distributed through INgrooves and is available only on iTunes. The short film depicts the founding members of Spinal Tap making a pilgrimage to Stonehenge for the first time.

On October 18, 2022, Spinal Tap star Michael McKean shared a deleted scene from the movie on his Twitter account and added: "Wow, thanks. Unseen by me, anyway, Lo these many years."

== Band members ==
=== Current members ===
- David St. Hubbins (portrayed by Michael McKean) – lead vocals, rhythm and lead guitar, acoustic guitar, bass guitar, harmonica (1964–present)
- Nigel Tufnel (portrayed by Christopher Guest) – lead and rhythm guitar, backing & lead vocals, bass guitar, piano, violin, violin bow, mandolin (1964–present)
- Derek Smalls (portrayed by Harry Shearer) – bass guitar, backing & lead vocals (1967–present)
- "Caucasian" Jeffery Vanston (portrayed by C. J. Vanston) – keyboards, backing vocals (1989–present)
- Didi Crockett (portrayed by Valerie Franco) – drums, percussion (2025–present)

=== Former members ===
This list contains both fictional former members of Spinal Tap and celebrities that have played with the band.

==== Guitar, backing vocals ====
- "Ricky from San Francisco" (1982) (played by singer Louie Merlino of Beggars & Thieves)
- Rhyan Gordon (1992) also played baseball bat

==== Keyboards, backing vocals ====
- Jan van der Kvelk (1965)
- Tony Brixton (1965–1966)
- Nick Wax (1965–1966)
- Dicky Laine (1965–1966)
- Denny Upham (1966–1968)
- Ross MacLochness (1974–1975)
- Viv Savage (David Kaff) (1975–1986) also played keyboard bass. Savage was allegedly killed when he went to visit the grave of former drummer Mick Shrimpton, whose grave exploded due to methane gas build-up.
- Favour Martin (1979)
- John Sinclair (1982)
- Jon Carin (Amnesty International performance in 1991)
- Jamie Cullum (Glastonbury 2009)
- Keith Emerson (Wembley Arena, June 30, 2009)

==== Bass guitar, backing vocals ====
- Cody Wheaton (1964)
- Ronnie Pudding (1964–1967) (Portrayed by Danny Kortchmar)
- Danny Jarman (1967)
- David Gilmour (Amnesty International performance in 1991)
- Tim Renwick (Amnesty International performance in 1991)
- Pino Palladino (Amnesty International performance in 1991)
- Nate Mendel, Malcolm Moore, James Hetfield, Kirk Hammett, Robert Trujillo, Gordon Moakes, Adam Yauch (Live Earth 2007)
- Jarvis Cocker (Glastonbury 2009)

==== Drums, percussion ====
- Actual

- Ric Parnell (This Is Spinal Tap, 1984 album; Break Like the Wind, 1992 album; died 2022)
- Gary Wallis (Amnesty International performance in 1991) (Wallis pretended to explode at the end of the performance)
- Jody Linscott (Amnesty International performance in 1991)
- Mick Fleetwood (2000)
- Gregg Bissonette (2008–2009)
- Todd Sucherman (2009)
- Chad Smith (2019)

- Fictional and deceased

- John "Stumpy" Pepys (1964–1966) (Portrayed by Ed Begley Jr. in the video "Gimme Some Money"). Died in a bizarre gardening accident of which the authorities said, "best leave it unsolved."
- Eric "Stumpy Joe" Childs (1966–1967). Choked on vomit of unknown origin, perhaps but not necessarily his own; the details are uncertain because "you can't really dust for vomit." The name is a homage to "Curly Joe" DeRita of the Three Stooges.
- Peter "James" Bond (1967–1970) (portrayed by Russ Kunkel, who was mistakenly credited as portraying Stumpy Joe). Spontaneously combusted on stage during the Blues-Jazz Festival on the Isle of Lucy, leaving behind what has been described alternately as a "globule" or a "stain" on his seat.
- Liam "Girly" Robinson (1970–1972). Died in his living room while reading Irene Iddesleigh by Amanda McKittrick Ros.
- Jade Brown (1972). Overdosed on sulfur dust.
- Dominic Jones (1972). Quit while touring L.A. and was immediately hit by a bus.
- Shane Walker (1972–1973). Quit while touring L.A. and was also hit by a bus almost immediately.
- Matthew Davies (1973). Maggot infection.
- Tony Sam Roberts (1973–1976). Died while trying to stop a ceiling fan with his head.
- Ross C. Smith (1976). Died laughing thinking about Monty Python's "The Funniest Joke in the World" sketch.
- Keith Williams LXXVIII (1976–1979). Wedgied himself to death.
- Robin Wilson (1979–1981). Mauled by a grizzly bear, even though there are no grizzly bears in England.
- Mick Shrimpton (1981–1982) (portrayed by R. J. "Ric" Parnell). Exploded onstage.
- Joe "Mama" Besser (1982) (portrayed by Fred Asparagus). Claimed he "couldn't take this 4/4 shit"; according to an MTV interview with Spinal Tap in November 1991, he disappeared along with the equipment during their Japanese tour. He is either dead or playing jazz. The name is a reference to that of Joe Besser, who similarly had a short-lived stint as a member of the Three Stooges; it is also a play on the insult phrase "Yo mama".
- Richard "Ric" Shrimpton (1984–1996). Allegedly sold his dialysis machine for drugs; presumed dead.
- Sammy "Stumpy" Bateman (1996–2001). Died trying to jump over a tank full of sharks while on a tricycle in a freak show.
- Scott "Skippy" Scuffleton (2000–2007). Sneezed himself into oblivion.
- Chris "Poppa" Cadeau (2007–2008). Eaten by his pet python Cleopatra.

==== Tambourine ====
- Dan Taman (1967)
- Lucinda Berniece Flynn (1965–1966)
- Jeanine Pettibone (1982). After she left, Jeanine opened her own Irish clothing store named Potato Republic.
- Stewart Ikin (1982). Backing tambourine; left the band to join Creme Brulee.
- Oliver Ridout (Amnesty International performance in 1991).
- Billy Murgatroyd (1996). Murgatroyd is the only tambourine player of the band to be killed, overdosing on coffee creamer.

==== Harmonica, backing vocals ====
- Little Danny Schindler (1965–1966)

==== Horns ====
- Keelan Hegarty (1965–1966)
- Geoff Clovington (1965–1966)
- Dan Taman (1967). Died while falling off a train as it was entering King's Cross station, his body was never recovered.

==== Backing vocals ====
- Lhasa Apso (1965–1966)
- Julie Scrubbs-Martin (1965–1966)
- Jimmy Adams (1965–1966)
- Xof Lorac (1982–1983)
- Andy Sutcliffe (1987). Died beating himself to death with his own shoes.

==== Cowbell, vibraslap ====
- Hildred Earle Wright (1965–1966)

==== Claves ====
Abbie Catharine Deforrest Drummond Garner (1965–1966).

=== Session members ===
- Dweezil Zappa – guitar on "Diva Fever"
- Cher – vocals on "Just Begin Again"
- Slash – guitar on "Break Like the Wind"
- Steve Lukather – guitar on "Break Like the Wind"
- Joe Satriani – guitar on "Break Like the Wind"
- Jeff Beck – guitar on "Break Like the Wind"
- Timothy B. Schmit – backing vocals on "Christmas with the Devil", "Cash on Delivery"
- Steve Vai – guitar on "Short and Sweet"
- John Mayer – guitar on "Short and Sweet"
- Phil Collen – guitar on "Short and Sweet"

== Discography ==
=== Actual discography ===
==== Studio albums ====
List of albums, with selected chart positions
Title	Details	Peak chart positions			
Title	Details	US	AUS	CAN	UK
This Is Spinal Tap	Released: March 2, 1984; Label: Polydor	121	—	—	—
Break Like the Wind	Released: March 17, 1992; Label: MCA, Geffen	61	67	44	51
Back from the Dead	Released: June 16, 2009; Label: Spuzzle, Polymer	52	76	—	—
The End Continues	Released: September 11, 2025; Label: Interscope	—	—	—	—

==== Singles ====
List of singles, with selected chart positions
Title	Year	Peak chart positions		Album
Title	Year	AUS	UK	Album
"Christmas with the Devil" / "Christmas with the Devil" (Scratch Mix) (Non-album track)	1984	—	—	Break Like the Wind
"Hell Hole" / "Big Bottom"	1984	—	—	This Is Spinal Tap
"Bitch School" / "Springtime"	1992	97	35	Break Like the Wind
"The Majesty of Rock" / "Stinkin' Up the Great Outdoors"	1992	—	61	Break Like the Wind
"Back from the Dead"	2000	—	—	Back from the Dead
"Warmer Than Hell"	2007	—	—	Back from the Dead
"Saucy Jack" (free MP3 download from official website)	2009	—	—	Non-album single
"Sex Farm" (2009)	2009	—	—	Back from the Dead
"Must Crush Barbie" (Derek Smalls solo release)	2023	—	—	Non-album single
"Stonehenge" (with Elton John)	2025	—	—	The End Continues

==== Guest appearances ====
List of guest appearances
Title	Year	Artist	Album
"We Three Kings"	2015	Various artists	Lost Christmas 2: Holiday Rarities

==== Music videos ====
"Hell Hole" (1984)

"Bitch School" (1992)

"The Majesty of Rock" (1992)

"Stonehenge" (with Elton John) (2025)

"Stonehenge" (with Elton John) (Lyric video) (2025)

"(Listen to The) Flower People" (with Elton John) (Lyric video) (2025)

"Cups and Cakes" (with Paul McCartney) (Lyric video) (2025)

"The Devil's Just Not Getting Old" (Lyric video) (2025)

"Nigel's Poem" (Lyric video) (2025)

"Brighton Rock" (Lyric video) (2025)

"Blood to Let" (Lyric video) (2025)

"Rockin' in the Urn" (Lyric video) (2025)

"Angels" (Lyric video) (2025)

"Judge and Jury" (Lyric video) (2025)

"I Kissed a Girl" (Lyric video) (2025)

=== Fictional discography ===
==== Studio albums ====
- Spinal Tap Sings "(Listen to the) Flower People" and Other Favourites (1967)
  - Just called Spinal Tap in the U.K.
- We Are All Flower People (1968)
  - The Incredible Flight of Icarus P. Anybody (1968): Rerelease of We Are All Flower People without the title track.
- Brainhammer (1970)
- Nerve Damage (1971)
- Blood to Let (1972)
- Intravenus de Milo (1974)
- The Sun Never Sweats (1975)
- Bent for the Rent (1976)
- Tap Dancing (1976)
- Rock 'n' Roll Creation (referred to as The Gospel According to Spinal Tap in the film) (1977)
- Shark Sandwich (1980)
- Smell the Glove (also known as The Black Album) (1982)
- Glamge (1997)
- www.spinaltap.album (2000)
- Faucet Back (2008)
- Tapped Out (2014)

==== Soundtrack albums ====
- The Efil Life of Pat Lanips (2005, soundtrack to the video game of the same name)

==== Live albums ====
- Silent but Deadly (1969)
- Jap Habit (1975)

==== Compilations ====
- Heavy Metal Memories (1983)

==== Singles ====
- "Gimme Some Money" / "Cups and Cakes" (1965)
- "(Listen to The) Flower People" / "Rainy Day Sun" (1967, from Spinal Tap Sings "(Listen to the) Flower People" and Other Favourites)
- "Breakfast of Evil" (1969, live from Silent but Deadly)
- "Silent but Deadly" (1969, live from Silent but Deadly)
- "Big Bottom" (1970, from Brainhammer)
- "Swallow My Love" (1970, from Brainhammer)
- "Nerve Damage" (1971)
- "Blood to Let" (1972, from Blood to Let)
- "Tonight I'm Gonna Rock You Tonight" (1974, from Intravenus de Milo)
- "Stonehenge" (1975, promo-only single, from The Sun Never Sweats)
- "Heavy Duty" (1976, from Bent for the Rent)
- "Bent for the Rent" (1976, from Bent for the Rent)
- "Tap Dancing" (1976)
- "Rock 'n' Roll Creation" (1977, from Rock 'n' Roll Creation)
- "Nice 'n' Stinky" (1977, live from Jap Habit)
- "Sex Farm" (1980, from Shark Sandwich)
- "No Place Like Nowhere" (1980, from Shark Sandwich)
- "Hell Hole" (1982, from Smell the Glove)

==== Bootlegs ====
- Audible Death (1969)
- Got Thamesmen on Tap (unknown date)
- Live at Budokan (1975)
- Openfaced Mako (1980)

==== Unreleased/unfinished material ====
- Here's More Tap (1970)
- Flak Packet (1974)
- Lusty Lorry (1976)

=== Actual solo discography ===
==== Derek Smalls ====
Title	Details
Smalls Change: Meditations Upon Ageing	Released on April 13, 2020, by BMG

=== Fictional solo discography ===
==== David St. Hubbins ====
- In Search of a Brown Note (1985) (unfinished album of jazz collaborations)

==== Nigel Tufnel ====
- Nigel Tufnel's Clam Caravan (1979) (Title is a misprint, 'twas meant to be called "Calm Caravan")
- Nigel Tufnel's Trilogy in D-minor (1988) (Never released), including song with the working title "Lick My Love Pump"
- Pyramid Blue (2008)

==== Derek Smalls ====
- It's a Smalls World (1978)
- It's a Dub World (1979) (bootleg)
- Suspensus Equus (1994) (Never released, recorded in Latin)

==== Ronnie Pudding ====
- Doesn't Anybody Here Speak English? (1969)
- I Am More Music (1977) (Recorded by his band, "Pudding People" for the Megaphone label)

==== Ross MacLochness ====
- Fingers (1987)

==== David St. Hubbins & Nigel Tufnel ====
1961 - "All the Way Home" (Unreleased demo. Would later appear on the Break Like the Wind album.)

==== David St. Hubbins & Derek Smalls ====
- Saucy Jack (1996) (Never released), a musical stage soundtrack based on the life of Jack the Ripper
  - The title song from the musical was rerecorded by the band and released in 2009 as a free MP3 download from the official Spinal Tap website.

== See also ==
- Bad News, a similar British band starting in 1983
