= Derek Smalls =

Fictional musician

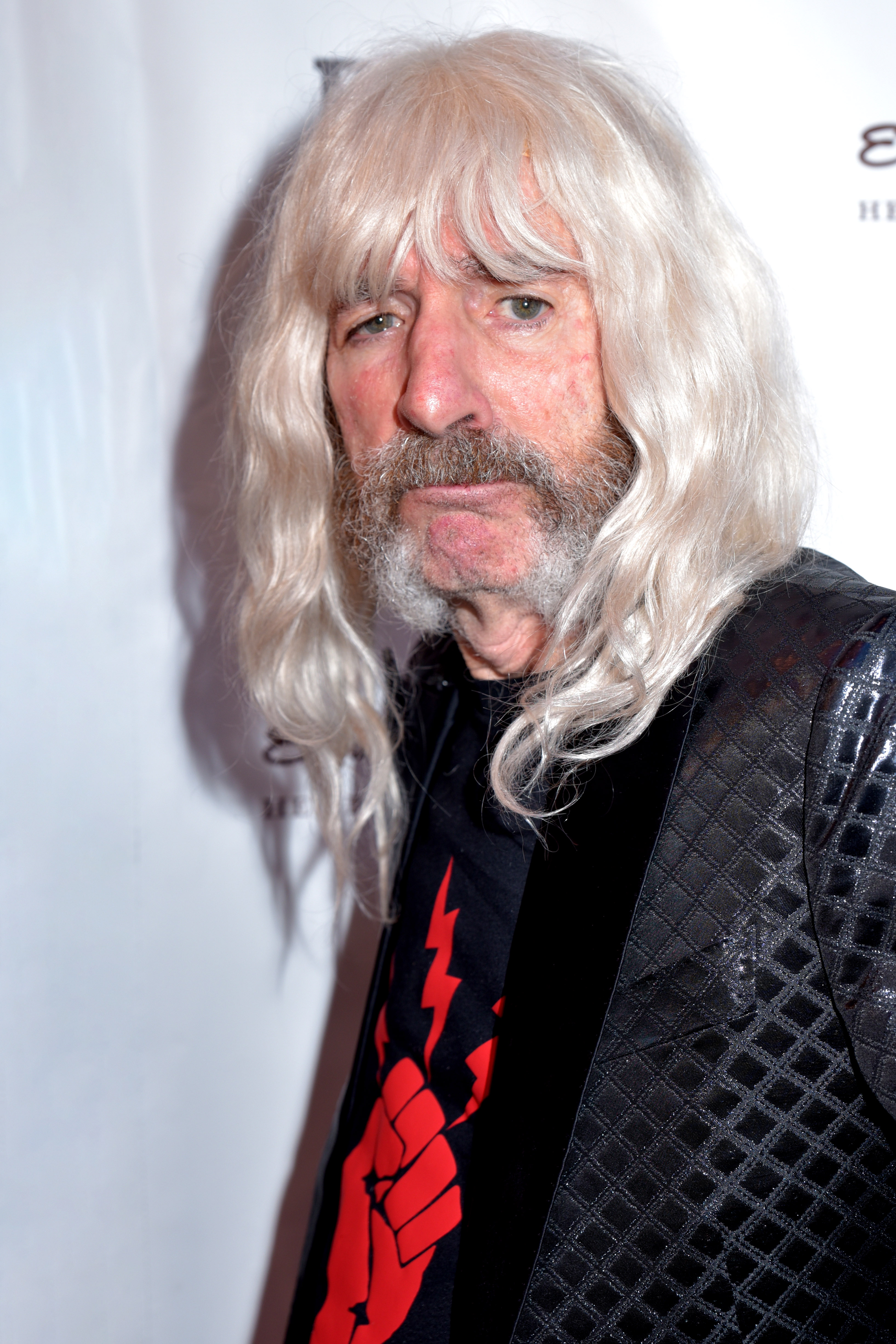
Harry Shearer as "Derek Smalls" (2019)

Derek Albion Smalls is a fictional character played by Harry Shearer in the spoof rockumentary This Is Spinal Tap and subsequent productions. He is the bassist for mock British heavy metal group Spinal Tap, playing alongside guitarists Nigel Tufnel (Christopher Guest) and David St. Hubbins (Michael McKean), as well as with a plethora of drummers and keyboardists.

== Fictional biography ==
Derek grew up in Nilford-on-Null in the West Midlands, England, where his father, Donald "Duff" Smalls, ran a telephone sanitisation business, "Sani-Fone". He joined Spinal Tap in 1967 after the departure of bassist Ronnie Pudding.

Derek has described bandmates David St. Hubbins and Nigel Tufnel as "distinct types of visionaries ... like fire and ice", saying that he considered his role in the band to be "in the middle of that, kind of like lukewarm water". A pipe-smoker, he has been known to enhance his appearance by placing a foil-wrapped courgette in his trousers, which resulted in an embarrassing incident passing through a metal detector at Chicago's O'Hare International Airport during 1982's "Tap Into America" tour.

Smalls played killer #1 in Marco Zamboni's Roma '79, and is the star of a series of comical Belgian television commercials for the snack food Floop. He is also a prize-winning gardener, having developed and patented a totally black rose, the 'Death by Midnight'. He released a solo album, It's a Smalls World, in the mid 1970s, and also played in the Christian rock band Lambsblood in the late 1980s before rejoining Spinal Tap for their reunion tour in 1992. During this period, he also worked briefly for his father's business. After the band broke up in 1992, Derek became employed as a "floater" in an elementary school, with such duties as a crossing guard and straightening library books. According to the 2007 short film Spinal Tap, it is revealed that Derek checked into rehab to be treated for an addiction to the internet.

A (real-life) solo album, Smalls Change (Meditations Upon Ageing), was announced in early 2018, including collaborations from many prominent rock musicians. Lead single "It Don't Get Old" (with writing credits given to Derek Smalls and David St. Hubbins) was issued in a picture sleeve for Record Store Day in 2018; however, inside the sleeve there was an erratum notice explaining that due to an 'error', the actual vinyl single had "mistakenly" not been included (but that the single could be digitally downloaded from a special site).

Smalls has expressed a desire to collaborate with Mozart. He said: "I think we'd have a lot to share. I know chords he's never used."

== Sources for character ==
The character appears in part to be a satire of Lemmy from Motörhead, who wore a similar mutton chop beard. However, his onstage mannerisms resemble those of fellow bass player Steve Dawson from the band Saxon, with whom Shearer went on the road before filming This Is Spinal Tap. "Harry Shearer came on tour with us in '82", confirmed singer Biff Byford. "The guy he based his character on was our old bass player Steve Dawson – the moustache, the pointing to the audience."

In the film, Smalls can be seen wearing both a Shrewsbury Town football shirt and a West Ham baseball cap.

Jethro Tull singer Ian Anderson has claimed that the name was derived from "Derek Small", which appears in the liner notes of the band's albums Thick as a Brick and A Passion Play. Asked by Anderson about the origin of the name, Shearer responded "I don't know—it just came out of my head." Anderson recalls then asking, "I don't suppose, Harry, you happen to have a copy of Thick as a Brick in your record collection at home?" to which he concluded (from Shearer's reaction): "And he knew I'd got him then."
