= Nigel Tufnel =

Fictional character

- Spinal Tap character
- Tufnel, as portrayed by Christopher Guest in This Is Spinal Tap (1984)
- Portrayed by: Christopher Guest

Nigel Tufnel is a fictional character in the 1984 mockumentary film This Is Spinal Tap and the 2025 film Spinal Tap 2: The End Continues. In the films, he is the lead guitarist of the rock band Spinal Tap. He is played by actor Christopher Guest.

== Character biography ==
Nigel Tufnel was born in Squatney, East London on 5 February 1948. He was given his first guitar, a Sunburst "Rhythm King", by his father at age six. His life changed when he met David St. Hubbins (Michael McKean) who lived next door. They began jamming together in a toolshed in David's garden, influenced by (fictional) early blues artists like Honkin' Bubba Fulton, Little Sassy Francis and particularly Big Little Daddy Coleman, a deaf guitar player, and wrote their first song, "All the Way Home". Before long they had formed their first band, The Thamesmen.

Tufnel had his television debut playing with Lenny and the Squigtones on American Bandstand and being interviewed by Dick Clark

Tufnel's hobbies include collecting guitars; particularly noteworthy is his Sea Foam Green six-string Fender Bass VI with the price tag still attached, which he has kept in mint condition by not allowing it to be played, touched, pointed at, looked at, or talked about. He also has a Gibson Les Paul 1959 model, whose acoustic properties and carved flame-maple top he praises. He also plays mandolin and piano, and does backing vocals. In the film he is writing a classical piece which he feels combines the musical characteristics of both Mozart and Bach (a "Mach piece") in D minor, which he claims is the "saddest of all keys". The piece is provisionally titled "Lick My Love Pump".

Tufnel has a great love for Gumby, carrying figurines of Gumby and Pokey in his shirt pocket and wearing Gumby shirts frequently. He is also a self-proclaimed "fish nut", liking cod and canned tuna because they have "no bones". Tufnel sits on the editorial board of his preferred in-flight periodical, Car and Driver. His favorite cookies are Oreos, but without the filling. A rider in his contract requires a large plate of Oreo halves, without frosting. Onstage he wears glam rock-inspired makeup and usually plays a Gibson Les Paul. He is almost always seen chewing gum.

Tufnel has stated that if he was not in the music industry he would like to either enter the field of haberdashery or become a surgeon.

== 2011 Nigel Tufnel Day ==
Tufnel is especially noted for his amplifier, which has numbering going "up to eleven", which he believes makes it louder than amplifiers that only go up to ten ("It's one louder"). When he is asked why the ten setting is not simply set to be louder, Nigel pauses, clearly confused, before responding, "These go to eleven."

In the run-up to 2011, Spinal Tap fans created a movement to make 11/11/11 "Nigel Tufnel Day." The movement was organised by The Nigel Tufnel Day Appreciation Society and Quilting Bee in Favour of Declaring & Observing 11 November 2011 as Nigel Tufnel Day (in Recognition of Its Maximum Elevenness). The theme of Nigel Tufnel Day was to take whatever you are doing on that day and "turn it up to 11".

== Fictional discography ==
=== Studio albums ===
- Nigel Tufnel's Clam Caravan (1979) (Title is a misprint, 'twas meant to be called "Calm Caravan")
- Nigel Tufnel's Trilogy in D-minor (1988) (Never released), including song with the working title "Lick My Love Pump"
- Pyramid Blue (2008)

=== Singles ===
- 1961 - "All the Way Home" (with David St. Hubbins) (Unreleased demo. Would later appear on the Break Like the Wind album.)

== Soloing techniques ==
- Using a violin (as opposed to a violin bow, as made famous by Jimmy Page) to play his guitar
- Playing a second guitar with his foot
- Classical music inspired solos
- Playing another guitar from a distance using horseshoes (as in The Return of Spinal Tap)
