= Marek Kanievska =

British film director (born 9 March 1948)

- Born: 9 March 1948 (age 78); London, England
- Other name: Marek Kaniewski
- Occupation: Film director
- Years active: 1976–present

Marek Kanievska (born 9 March 1948) is a British film director. His films have won awards at the Cannes Film Festival and the Florence Film Festival. His 2004 film A Different Loyalty was entered into the 26th Moscow International Film Festival.

== Career ==
Kanievska began his television directing career in Australia in the early 1970s with Crawford Productions, producing episodes of the drama series Matlock Police (1971–1976), which details the lives of policemen working in a fictional country town in Victoria.

Returning to London, Kanievska spent the latter half of the 1970s building up a range of credits including live television and entertainment programmes like Our Show (1977–1978) and the drama serial Rooms (1974).

During this period he also helmed episodes of the ITV detective drama Hazell (1978–1979); a parody of early film-noir, Shoestring (1979–1980); another detective drama for the BBC, Thomas & Sarah (1979), a spin-off from the BAFTA Award winning series Upstairs, Downstairs; A Light that Shines (1979) for BBC 2 Play of the Week; and various instalments of ITV Playhouse (1967–1983), a comedy drama series featuring contributions from playwrights such as Dennis Potter, Rhys Adrian, and Alan Sharp.

In the early 1980s Kanievska directed several episodes of Muck and Brass (1982) starring Mel Smith as an opportunistic property developer in the Midlands. Dealing with issues of greed, corruption, and power politics in council chambers, the series had a hard-edged realism and gritty humour that was greeted with acclaim on its original transmission.

== Early features ==
Following a short film called The First Day (1980), a docu-drama starring Miranda Richardson, Kanievska's career as a feature director began in earnest with Another Country (1984), a British romantic historical drama written by Julian Mitchell and adapted from his play of the same title.

The film is loosely based on the life of the spy and double agent Guy Burgess and explores his homosexuality and exposure to Marxism while examining the hypocrisy and snobbery of the English public school system. Starring Rupert Everett and Colin Firth, the film was entered into the 1984 Cannes Film Festival where it won the award for Best Artistic Contribution. It was also nominated for three BAFTA Awards in 1984: Editing (Gerry Hambling), Most Outstanding Newcomer to Film (Rupert Everett), and Adapted Screenplay (Julian Mitchell).

Encountering Kanievska for the first time on set, Everett recalls "Marek was an eccentric Pole, only ten years older than most of the actors and quite unlike the normal British director of those times. He was not class-obsessed and did not put himself on a pedestal."

Of his visual aesthetic Everett recalls, "He was addicted to complicated tracking shots where the camera is put on a kind of railway and moves around during the action, like a silent voyeur … Marek directed it beautifully. Another Country was the best-made film of my career."

Kanievska followed this with Less than Zero (1987) an American drama very loosely based on Bret Easton Ellis' novel of the same name. The film stars Andrew McCarthy as Clay, a college freshman returning home for Christmas to spend time with his ex-girlfriend Blair (Jami Gertz) and his friend Julian (Robert Downey, Jr.), who is struggling with drug addiction. The film presents a look at the culture of wealthy, decadent youth in 1980s Los Angeles.

Ellis, initially hostile to the film over liberties taken with the source material was interviewed in 2006 saying that he has "really warmed up to it now." Still maintaining the movie bears little resemblance to his novel, he goes on to say, "… it's a beautiful looking film … I don't know any other movies that caught that period in LA so well."

Less than Zero was voted as the 22nd best film set in Los Angeles in the last 25 years by a group of Los Angeles Times writers and editors.

== Commercials ==
During the 1980s and 1990s Kanievska also helmed a variety of high-profile television and cinema commercials as a director with Ridley Scott Associates (RSA), a film and commercial production company founded by Ridley Scott and Tony Scott. Work during this period included campaigns for a broad roster of clients including Shell, Mercedes, Chrysler, Renault, Deutsche Bank, Kronenbourg 1664, Pernod, Miller, and Guinness.

His work with RSA earned him several Golden Lions from the British Advertising Awards.

== 2000 – present ==
A return to features in 2000 saw Kanievska directing Paul Newman and Linda Fiorentino in Where the Money Is, from a script written by E. Max Frye. Newman stars as legendary bank robber Henry Manning who ends up in prison where he suffers a stroke. Transferred to a nursing home Henry meets Carol Ann McKay (his carer, played by Fiorentino), a high school prom queen whose glamour days are well behind her. Gradually Carol Ann starts to suspect that Henry isn't as sick as he seems and they are soon working together to plan his final and greatest score.

Kanievska followed this with A Different Loyalty (2004), a drama inspired by the story of British traitor Kim Philby's love affair and marriage to Eleanor Brewer in Beirut and his eventual defection to the Soviet Union. The story takes place in the 1960s and stars Sharon Stone and Rupert Everett. A Different Loyalty was entered into the 26th Moscow International Film Festival.

On the experience of reuniting with Kanievska and the logistical problems of shooting in Russia, Everett recalls "We had no permits to shoot in Red Square, and Marek particularly wanted a shot of me walking past Lenin's tomb, so early one morning five of us snuck out and hid behind an archway until there was no\body about. When the coast was clear we all jumped out and filmed for a couple of minutes while the soldiers back was turned. It was such fun to work this way and we were all thoroughly invigorated."

Having retired from filmmaking, Kanievska now focuses on travel and photography. He also participates in kite surfing, paragliding, and paramotoring in various locations around the world.

== Filmography ==
=== Film ===
- The First Day (1980) – short film
- Another Country (1984)
- Less than Zero (1987)
- Where the Money Is (2000)
- A Different Loyalty (2004)

=== Television ===
- Matlock Police (1971–1976)
- Within These Walls (1976–1978)
- Hazell (1979)
- ITV Playhouse (1979)
- Thomas & Sarah (1979)
- Shoestring (1979–1980)
- Muck and Brass (1982)
