= Another Country (1984 film) =

- Theatrical release poster
- Directed by: Marek Kanievska
- Written by: Julian Mitchell
- Based on: Another Country by Julian Mitchell
- Produced by: Alan Marshall; Robert Fox
- Starring: Rupert Everett; Colin Firth; Cary Elwes
- Cinematography: Peter Biziou
- Edited by: Gerry Hambling
- Music by: Michael Storey
- Production companies: Virgin Films; Goldcrest; National Film Finance Corporation; Eastern Counties Newspapers, Ltd.
- Distributed by: 20th Century Fox
- Release date: 29 June 1984
- Running time: 90 minutes
- Country: United Kingdom
- Language: English
- Budget: £1.6 million
- Box office: $1.5 million (US)

Another Country is a 1984 British romantic historical drama written by Julian Mitchell, adapted from his play of the same name. Directed by Marek Kanievska, the film stars Rupert Everett and Colin Firth in his feature film debut.

Another Country is loosely based on the life of the spy and double agent Guy Burgess, named Guy Bennett in the film. It explores his homosexuality and exposure to Marxism from a friend, while examining the hypocrisy and snobbery of the English public school system.

== Plot ==
The setting is an unnamed public school, modelled on Eton and Winchester, in the 1930s. Guy Bennett and Tommy Judd are pupils and, because they are both outsiders in their own ways, friends (Bennett is gay while Judd is a Marxist).

One day, a teacher walks in on a pupil, Martineau, and a boy from another house engaged in mutual masturbation. Martineau subsequently hangs himself, as teachers and the senior pupils try their hardest to keep the scandal away from parents and the outside world. The scandal, however, gives the army-obsessed house captain, Fowler, a welcome reason to scheme against Bennett. Fowler dislikes him and Judd and wants to stop Bennett from becoming a "God" – a school title for the two top prefects. Fowler is able to intercept a love note from Bennett to James Harcourt. Bennett agrees to be punished with a caning so as not to compromise Harcourt; on earlier occasions, he had avoided punishment by blackmailing the other "Lords" (a term used for the lower prefects) with the threat that he would reveal their own experiences with him.

Meanwhile, Judd is reluctant to become a prefect, since he feels that he cannot endorse a "system of oppression". He makes a bitter speech about how the boys oppressed by the system grow up to be the fathers who maintain it. Eventually, however, he agrees to become a prefect in order to prevent Fowler from becoming Head of House. This never comes about because another pupil, Donald Devenish, agrees to stay at school and become a prefect if he is nominated to become a God instead of Bennett.

Devastated at the loss of his cherished dream of becoming a God, Bennett comes to realise that the British class system strongly relies on outward appearance and that to be openly gay is a severe hindrance to his intended career as a diplomat.

The film's epilogue says that Bennett defected to Russia later in his life, after having been a spy for the Soviet Union. Judd died fighting in the Spanish Civil War.

== Cast ==
- Rupert Everett as Guy Bennett, based on Guy Burgess
- Colin Firth as Tommy Judd, based on John Cornford
- Cary Elwes as James Harcourt
- Michael Jenn as Barclay
- Robert Addie as Delahay
- Rupert Wainwright as Donald Devenish
- Tristan Oliver as Fowler
- Piers Flint-Shipman, credited as Frederick Alexander, as Jim Menzies
- Adrian Ross Magenty as Wharton
- Geoffrey Bateman as Yevgeni
- Philip Dupuy as Martineau
- Guy Henry as Head Boy
- Jeffry Wickham as Arthur
- John Line as Best Man
- Gideon Boulting as Trafford
- Nicholas Rowe as Spungin
- Anna Massey as Imogen Bennett
- Betsy Brantley as Julie Schofield
- Jim Tavaré (uncredited) as a featured extra Student and Colin Firth's stand-in

Charles Spencer, 9th Earl Spencer, the younger brother of Diana, Princess of Wales, is an extra (with no dialogue) in three scenes.

== Title ==
The title refers not only to Soviet Russia, which is the "other country" Bennett turns to in the end, but it can be seen to take on a number of different meanings and connotations. It could be a reference to the first line of the second (or third, depending on the version) stanza of the hymn "I Vow to Thee, My Country," which is sung in both the play and film, as well as referring to the fact that English public school life in the 1930s was indeed very much like "another country." In the hymn, the other country referred to is Heaven (or the Kingdom of Heaven). Near the end of the film, communism is associated with heaven:

Guy: Wouldn't it be wonderful if communism were true? What, heaven on earth?
Tommy: Earth on earth. The just earth.

Another Country is also the title of a 1962 novel by James Baldwin, which includes gay and bisexual characters. The Go-Between is a novel by L. P. Hartley, published in London in 1953 and beginning with the famous line: "The past is a foreign country: they do things differently there." The lead is often misquoted using the expression 'another country.'

The most direct reference is to several well-known lines from English literature, originating from Christopher Marlowe's play The Jew of Malta (c. 1590).

Friar Barnadine: Thou hast committed–
Barabas: Fornication– but that was in another country; / And besides, the wench is dead.

Here, "the wench" may refer to Martineau. Most of the students are more interested in covering up a potential scandal than worrying about the actual death. If so, the "adultery" may refer to what is done to Martineau and perhaps all students by the school, rather than his actual sexual liaisons.

== Production ==
The play premiered in 1981. Julian Mitchell adapted his own play for the screen. Rupert Everett, who had played the role of Bennett in the play's first run, was cast in that role for the film. Colin Firth played the role originated on stage by Kenneth Branagh.

Producer Alan Marshall approached Jake Eberts of Goldcrest Films seeking finance with Marek Kanievska attached as director. Eberts wrote in his memoirs that he was "immediately enthusiastic" about the project although he had doubts about Kanievska's inexperience. He only agreed to the director because of Marshall's enthusiasm. Goldcrest Films provided £735,000 of the budget. Eberts would not invest any more out of concern there was a limited audience for a film that told a homosexual story. The balance was made up of £500,000 from the National Film Finance Corporation, deferred fees, and the proceeds of a tax leasing deal with Eastern Counties Newspapers. Jake Eberts of Goldcrest says Alan Marshall's producing ensured the film came in on time and on budget while not losing any production value.

Eton College declined to serve as a location for the film. With an additional fountain brought in, the Old Schools Quadrangle at Oxford University became an important location, along other localities such as the Bodleian Library, Brasenose College, Brasenose Lane, and Broad Street. Many interiors were shot at Althorp, seat of the Spencer family. Other scenes were filmed at Apethorpe Hall.

Twenty years later, Everett played the lead in another Marek Kanievska film, A Different Loyalty (2004), playing a spy based on Kim Philby, a close associate of spy Guy Burgess, whom the Bennett character is based on. Everett later called Another Country "the best made film of my career."

== Reception ==
=== Critical reception ===
On the review aggregator website Rotten Tomatoes, the film holds an approval rating of 60%, based on 10 reviews, with an average rating of 6.3/10.

=== Box office ===
The film made $1.5 million at the North American box office. Goldcrest Films invested £735,000 in the movie and received £858,000 in return, making them a profit of £123,000.

=== Awards ===
The film was entered into the 1984 Cannes Film Festival where it won the award for Best Artistic Contribution.

It was nominated for three BAFTA Awards in 1985: Editing for Gerry Hambling, Most Promising Newcomer to Leading Film Roles for Rupert Everett, and Adapted Screenplay for Julian Mitchell.

== See also ==
- List of lesbian, gay, bisexual, or transgender-related films by storyline
