= Jim Piddock =

British actor (b. 1956)

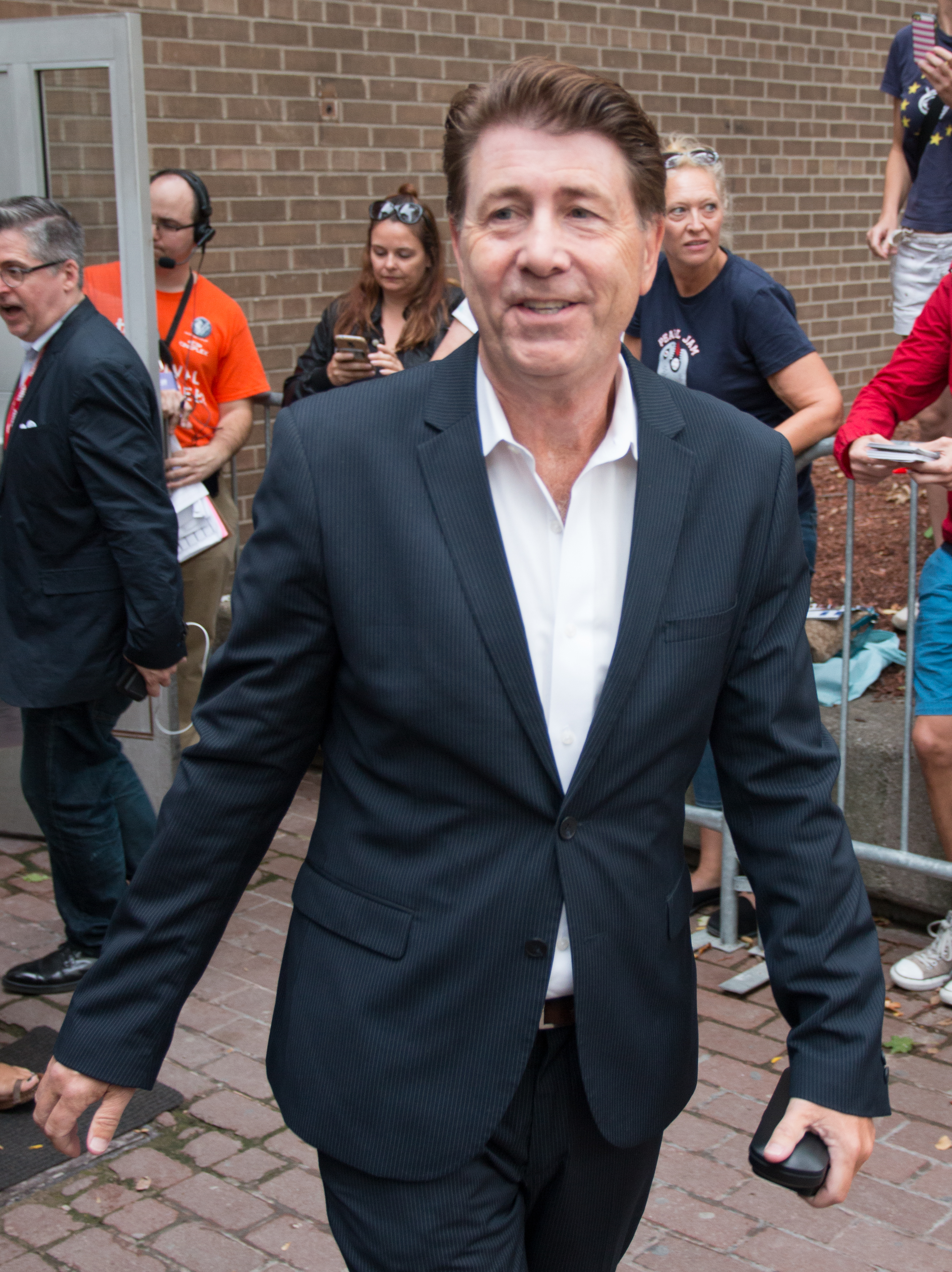
- Piddock exiting the premiere of the film Mascots at the 2016 Toronto International Film Festival
- Born: James Anthony Piddock; April 8, 1956 (age 70); Rochester, Kent, England
- Education: Drama Studio London; King's College, London University
- Occupations: Actor, producer, writer, and author
- Years active: 1978–present
- Spouse(s): Margaret Oberman (m. 1991; div. 2004) Ann Cusack (m. 2023)
- Children: 1

James Anthony Piddock (born 8 April 1956) is an English actor, writer, producer, and author whose career spans over four decades. After training at Drama Studio London and graduating from King’s College, London, he began on stage in the UK before relocating to the United States in his early twenties. He made his U.S. theatrical debut in the one-man show The Boy’s Own Story in San Francisco, winning critical praise, and soon moved to Broadway, appearing in productions including Present Laughter, Noises Off, The Knack, and Design for Living.

Transitioning into television and film, Piddock has collected a wide-ranging résumé. He has appeared in ensemble comedies by Christopher Guest, such as Best in Show, A Mighty Wind, and For Your Consideration. Piddock has also worked on numerous major studio films such as Lethal Weapon 2, Independence Day, The Prestige, Austin Powers in Goldmember, and The Five-Year Engagement. On television, his credits include guest roles on Friends, ER, Lost, Modern Family, Mom, Castle, Law & Order: LA, among many others.

In addition to acting, Piddock is a prolific voice actor, lending his voice to video games (notably Major Zero in Metal Gear Solid 3) and animated series. He made his first major writing breakthrough in the 1990s, selling a spec screenplay, and went on to write and produce films such as The Tooth Fairy and A Different Loyalty. He also co-created the HBO/BBC series Family Tree with Christopher Guest. In 2022, he published his memoir, Caught With My Pants Down and Other Tales from a Life in Hollywood.

== Early life ==
Piddock was born to Celia Mary (née O'Callaghan) and Charles Frederick Piddock, in Rochester, Kent. His mother worked as a medical receptionist, and his father, raised by an aunt, became an agricultural engineer. Although Piddock decided as a teenager that he wanted to be an actor, he later learned that his family had deep roots in show business. His grandfather, Harry Piddock, had performed a Music Hall act with Charlie Chaplin, and his great-grandfather, J.C. Piddock, was a well-known comedian and singer.

Piddock attended Worth School from the age of 10, a Catholic boarding school in Sussex. In his memoir, he referred to being "bored" during his education, until he was cast in a school play. He described opening night of the play as the moment he knew he wanted to become an actor. After that, Piddock wrote and acted in the school's annual comedy revues, often appearing with Robert Bathurst. The comedy revues at Worth had also seen Harry Enfield perform while at the school.

After finishing school, Piddock studied English Literature and Language at King's College, London University, where by his own admission he spent "most of my time majoring in the subjects of acting and playing football" although he graduated with Honours. He was accepted into Drama Studio London, having auditioned for his first choice Royal Academy of Dramatic Art.

== Career ==
=== Stage career ===
Before moving to the United States, Piddock built his early career on the British stage. After graduating from drama school, he toured the UK for nine months with the Spectrum Theatre Company. He then worked extensively in regional repertory theatres in Chelmsford, Tunbridge Wells, Torquay, and Weston-Super-Mare, frequently playing leading roles. During this period, he also became the youngest director working in British repertory theatre. His early professional credits included a role in John Bull’s Other Island at the Greenwich Theatre in 1980.

After leaving England for the United States, Piddock made his American theatrical debut in The Boy's Own Story, a one-man show about a football goalkeeper, at the Julian Theatre in San Francisco, for which he received the Bay Area Theatre Critics award for Best Actor (1981). He also won the Drama-Logue Critics Award for best actor for his performances in the one-man show. After being extended twice to accommodate the growing demand to see the show, the play transferred to the York Theatre, off-Broadway in New York in 1982. That same year, he was cast as Fred in Noël Coward's Present Laughter, starring George C. Scott and in which he made his Broadway debut along with Nathan Lane, Kate Burton, and Dana Ivey. The production was an instant hit and other Broadway and Off-Broadway shows followed, including the original US production of Noises Off,, in which he created the role of Tim Allgood in America, The Knack at the Roundabout Theatre, Make and Break starring Peter Falk, and Otto in Design For Living. Piddock said this about his stage career;

"I spent the first few years of my career pretty much doing nothing but stage work. I started in rep companies in England then did a one-man show in the US which led very quickly to doing several Broadway shows. I got very lucky early on. They were fun shows to do. I was in the first ever production of Noises Off in America and my first ever job in New York was being directed by and appearing with George C. Scott."

After moving to Los Angeles, Piddock became an artistic associate at the Los Angeles Theatre Center, where he appeared in Diary of a Hunger Strike alongside Colm Meaney, the role of Jack Worthing in The Importance of Being Earnest, the classic British 1960's revue Beyond the Fringe, and Mick in Harold Pinter's The Caretaker (play), for which he won a Los Angeles Drama Desk award (1988) for Best Actor. The same year, he also won a Drama Desk award for his performance opposite Jean Smart in How the Other Half Loves at the Tiffany Theater in West Hollywood.

In November 2007, he cemented his reputation as one of the UK's most renowned comedy actors when he appeared at the Ricardo Montalbán Theatre in Hollywood, starring in a production of What About Dick? alongside an all British expat cast, including Billy Connolly, Tim Curry, Eric Idle, Eddie Izzard, Jane Leeves, Emily Mortimer and Tracey Ullman. When the play officially premiered in 2012, with the addition of Russell Brand, he was again in the cast. Piddock also worked with Eric Idle in 2009 on An Evening Without Monty Python, a 40 year anniversary tribute to Monty Python's Flying Circus, which he starred in with Alan Tudyk, Jane Leeves, Rick Holmes, and Jeff B. Davis. The show played at the Ricardo Montalban Theatre in Los Angeles and then on Broadway at The Town Hall.

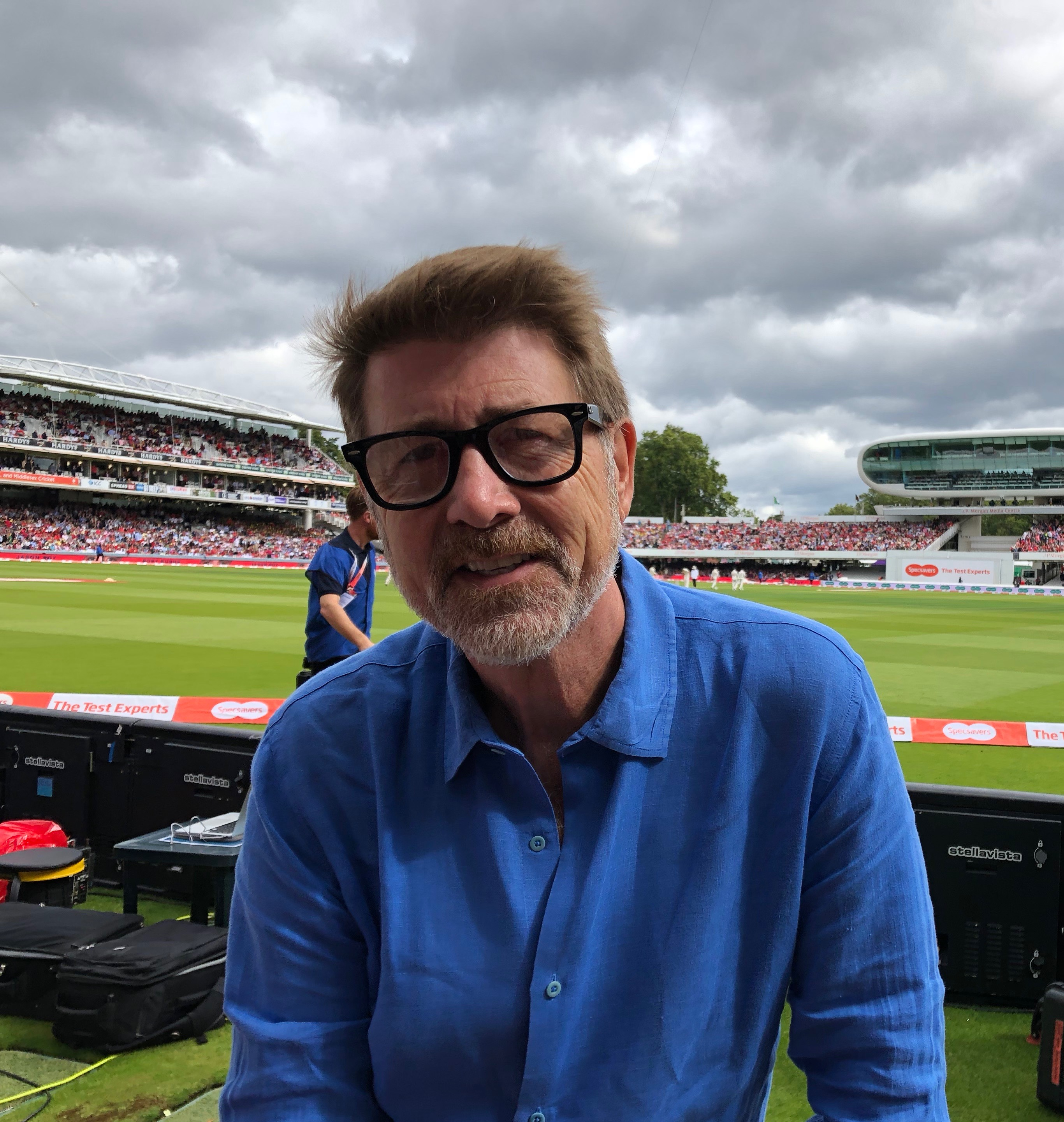
Piddock attending a Test match between England and Australia at Lord's cricket ground in 2019

=== Film and television career ===
Of his transition into television, Piddock said:

I'd always wanted to end up working in film and TV. I guess I could have stayed in New York and probably had a long and fruitful career in the theatre but in the mid-1980s I felt like it was time to change gears and I'd certainly not been short-changed in terms of getting to perform live.

He has appeared in close to a hundred TV shows, including The Blacklist, The Haunting of Bly Manor, Modern Family, A Confession, Designated Survivor, Get Shorty, Training Day, Mom, Childrens Hospital, The Royals, Touch, Two and a Half Men, Castle, ER, Law & Order: LA, Party Down, Chuck, Dollhouse, Without a Trace, Monk, Lost, Crossing Jordan, Citizen Baines, Friends, Yes, Dear, Angel, The Tracey Ullman Show, Murder She Wrote, Coach, Tour of Duty, Max Headroom, and The Twilight Zone.

He has also appeared in several TV films and mini-series, including From The Earth to the Moon, A Mom for Christmas, She Creature on HBO, and The Women of Windsor. He also created, wrote and produced the BBC series Too Much Sun.

His film appearances include Get Him to the Greek, Woody Allen's You Will Meet a Tall Dark Stranger. Falling Up, The Seeker: The Dark Is Rising, Who's Your Caddy?, Epic Movie, Meet the Spartans, The Prestige, Love for Rent, A Different Loyalty, See This Movie, Austin Powers in Goldmember, Multiplicity, Independence Day, Traces of Red, and Lethal Weapon 2.

He also notably appeared in the Christopher Guest comedies Best in Show as the Dog Show commentator Trevor Beckwith with Fred Willard, Leonard Crabbe in A Mighty Wind, Simon Whitset in For Your Consideration, and Owen Golly Sr. in Mascots, the last of which he co-wrote and produced.

In 2013, he also created, starred in, and produced the critically-acclaimed HBO and BBC television series Family Tree with Christopher Guest, in which he played Chris O'Dowd's character's eccentric landlord Mr. Pfister.

=== Voice work ===
As a voice actor, Piddock provided the voice of Major Zero in the English version of the video game Metal Gear Solid 3: Snake Eater as well as Agent One in Return to Castle Wolfenstein for Xbox and PlayStation 2. In film he provided the voice of Bolero the Bull in the film Garfield 2 and of Kenneth Loring, the fictional artistic director of Forever Young Films, in the commentary of the directors' cut of the Coen brothers' Blood Simple. He also voiced the part of King Mufasa's hornbill majordomo, Zazu in the Disney games Timon & Pumbaa's Jungle Games and The Lion King: Simba's Mighty Adventure, Batman's butler, Alfred Pennyworth, in the DC Comics animated film Batman: Under the Red Hood, and voiced Chic for the animated science fiction film Dead Space: Downfall, based on the video game Dead Space.

=== Later work ===
Piddock appeared in 2012's The Five-Year Engagement, which starred Jason Segel and Emily Blunt, playing Blunt's father, The Cold Light of Day starring Henry Cavill, Bruce Willis and Sigourney Weaver, 1915, Kill Your Friends, and The Dictator with Sacha Baron Cohen.

In August 2012, it was announced that Piddock would be co-writing, acting, and producing a new TV comedy series with Christopher Guest for HBO and the BBC titled Family Tree. The show subsequently aired in 2013.

On 13 October 2016, Mascots, which he also co-wrote with Guest, stars in, and produced, premiered on Netflix. Since then he has appeared in several television shows, including Modern Family, Designated Survivor, Get Shorty, Training Day, Blunt Talk, and The Royals.

In 2021, he played Captain Carradine in the film Haunting of the Queen Mary, which was shot in the UK and the US and released in 2023.

Most recently, Piddock played the role of the head of MI6 in the second season of the FOX comedy Going Dutch, starring Denis Leary, which is due to be released in early 2026.

=== Writing and producing ===
Piddock wrote the story for and produced Tooth Fairy starring Dwayne Johnson, Ashley Judd, Julie Andrews, Stephen Merchant, and Seth MacFarlane, New Line's action-comedy The Man, starring Samuel L. Jackson and Eugene Levy, One Good Turn, Traces of Red, and the Cold War romantic thriller A Different Loyalty starring Rupert Everett and Sharon Stone, in which Piddock played the supporting role of George Quennell, who was based on the notorious spy Donald Maclean.

=== Author ===
His memoir, Caught with My Pants Down and Other Tales from a Life in Hollywood, chronicling his four decades in the entertainment industry, was released on March 14, 2022, in paperback, ebook, and audiobook formats.

== Personal life ==
Piddock lived with and dated Linda Kozlowski in New York in the late 1970s/early 1980s, before he moved to Los Angeles. He was married to former Saturday Night Live writer Margaret Oberman from 1991 until 2004. Together they have a daughter who was born in 1994.

Piddock married actress and singer Ann Cusack on April 1, 2023 in a private ceremony at their home in the Hollywood Hills, California. British-born Piddock has lived in Los Angeles since the mid-1980s, but also splits his time between other residences in London and Provence.

He is a lifelong supporter of the English football team, Crystal Palace. In 1999, when the club entered administration with debts of £22 million, Piddock subsequently became a founder of the Crystal Palace Supporters Trust in an attempt to save the club. The formation of the supporters trust and the funds raised was seen as "a lifeline" for the club, which was eventually saved. The co-founders of the trust were recognised by the English Football Hall of Fame for their fan activism.

He has also supported Crystal Palace's official charitable arm Palace for Life on numerous fundraising efforts. In 2023, Piddock played in the charitable football match, Palace Aid, which was held at Selhurst Park. He also announced that 25% of the proceeds from his book released in 2025 would go to the foundation, and 25% to BAFTA's "Access for All" programme. Piddock has also worked alongside the club to provide talks to school leavers in South London.

== Filmography ==
=== Film ===
Year	Title	Role	Notes
1989	Lethal Weapon 2	Consulate Envoy	
1992	Traces of Red	Mr. Martyn	Also writer
1996	Independence Day	Reginald	
1996	Multiplicity	Maitre d'	
1997	Burn Hollywood Burn	Attendant #1	
2000	Best in Show	Trevor Beckwith	
2002	Austin Powers in Goldmember	Headmaster	
2003	A Mighty Wind	Leonard Crabbe	
2004	See This Movie	Martin Hughes	
2004	A Different Loyalty	George Quennell	Also writer and co-producer
2005	Love for Rent	Frank Bauman	
2005	Death to the Supermodels	Self-help Ryan	Voice, direct-to-video
2006	Garfield: A Tail of Two Kitties	Bolero	Voice
2006	For Your Consideration	Simon Whitset	
2006	The Prestige	Prosecutor	
2007	Epic Movie	Magneto	
2007	Who's Your Caddy?	Harrington	
2007	The Seeker: The Dark Is Rising	Old George	
2008	Meet the Spartans	Loyalist / Simon Cowell Look-Alike	
2008	Dead Space: Downfall	Chic	Voice, direct-to-video
2009	Falling Up	Phillip Dowling	
2009	Endless Bummer	Mr. Newell	
2010	You Will Meet a Tall Dark Stranger	Peter Wicklow	
2010	Get Him to the Greek	Limousine Driver in London	
2010	Batman: Under the Red Hood	Alfred Pennyworth	Voice, direct-to-video
2012	The Cold Light of Day	Meckler	
2012	The Five-Year Engagement	George Barnes	
2012	The Dictator	Unknown	Uncredited
2014	Think Like a Man Too	Declan	
2015	1915	Jeffrey	
2015	Kill Your Friends	Derek Sommers	
2016	Mascots	Owen Golly, Sr.	Also writer and executive producer
2023	Haunting of the Queen Mary	Captain Caradine	

=== Television ===
Year	Title	Role	Notes
1985	Wildside	Bank Robber	Episode: "The Crimea of the Century"
1985	The Twilight Zone	Brian	Episode: "Take My Life... Please!/Devil's Alphabet/The Library"
1986	Fame	The Record Producer	Episode: "Fame and Fortune"
1987	The Tracey Ullman Show	Derrick	2 episodes
1988	Max Headroom	Mr. Kelly	Episode: "Neurostim"
1988	CBS Summer Playhouse	Hank	Episode: "Old Money"
1989	Tour of Duty	Maj. Shadlow	Episode: "Lonely at the Top"
1990	A Mom for Christmas	Wilkins	Television film
1990–1991	Coach	Alan / Attendant	2 episodes
1993	Murder, She Wrote	Malcolm Brooker	Episode: "Murder in White"
1994–1996	Mad About You	Logic Professor / Hal Conway	7 episodes
1997–1998	Team Knight Rider	Max Amendas	2 episodes
1998	From the Earth to the Moon	John Hodge	Episode: "Can We Do This?"
1998	The New Batman Adventures	Martin	Voice, episode: "Cult of the Cat"
1999	Tracey Takes On...	Vicar	Episode: "Hair"
2000	The Geena Davis Show	Mr. Levenstein	Episode: "Piece of Cake"
2000	Angel	The Valet	Episode: "The Trial"
2001	Yes, Dear	Vet	Episode: "Worst in Show"
2001	Friends	Dennis Phillips	Episode: "The One After I Do"
2001	She Creature	Captain Dunn	Television film
2001	Citizen Baines	Larry	Episode: "The Appraisal"
2002	Maybe It's Me	Judge Parks	Episode: "The Quahog Festival Episode"
2002	The Drew Carey Show	Lord Mercer	4 episodes
2002	ER	Dr. Earl Whitehead	Episode: "Chaos Theory"
2003	Crossing Jordan	Norman Gibson	Episode: "Family Ties"
2004	The Rutles 2: Can't Buy Me Lunch	Troy Nixon	Television film
2005	Lost	Francis Heatherton	Episode: "Homecoming"
2006	That '70s Show	TV Announcer	Voice, episode: "Crazy Little Thing Called Love"; uncredited
2006	Monk	Jake Colbert	Episode: "Mr. Monk Can't See a Thing"
2007	Without a Trace	Dr. McNeil	Episode: "Claus and Effect"
2008	The Middleman	Arthur Mendelson	Episode: "The Cursed Tuba Contingency"
2009	Dollhouse	Biz	Episode: "Stage Fright"
2009–2011	Batman: The Brave and the Bold	Doctor Sivana, Dr. Watson, Shazam	4 episodes
2010	Chuck	Curator of Classical Art	Episode: "Chuck Versus the Mask"
2010	Ben 10: Ultimate Alien	King Urien, Color Commentator, Chair Umpire	Voice, episode: "Duped"
2010	Party Down	Leland Corke	Episode: "Not on Your Wife Opening Night"
2010	Law & Order: LA	Jay Bickson	Episode: "Hollywood"
2010	Castle	Lord Henry	Episode: "Punked"
2011	Up All Night	Matthew Taylor	Episode: "New Car"
2011	Two and a Half Men	Edward	Episode: "One False Move, Zimbabwe!"
2012	Touch	Dr. Knox	Episode: "Zone of Exclusion"
2012	Childrens Hospital	Cyrus Mittleman	Episode: "British Hospital"
2013	Family Tree	Mr. Pfister	5 episodes; also writer and executive producer
2013	NTSF:SD:SUV::	Hobson Chipps	Episode: "Hawaii Die-0"
2013	Work It	Carl	Episode: "My So-Called Mid-Life Crisis"
2014	Turbo Fast	Sir Reginald, Rich Man #2	Voice, episode: "The Escargot Affair"
2014	Franklin & Bash	Dean Casseday	Episode: "Spirits in the Material World"
2014	Mom	Kenneth	Episode: "Forged Resumes and the Recommended Dosage"
2015	Man Seeking Woman	Unknown	Episode: "Stain"
2015	Marry Me	Chuck	Episode: "Date Me"
2015	Instant Mom	Dr. Ian Houser	Episode: "Ghost Busted"
2015	Teenage Mutant Ninja Turtles	Lord Simultaneous, Sir John, Overmind, Warbot	Voice, 2 episodes
2015	The Grinder	Barrister Cromwell	Episode: "Buckingham Malice"
2015	The Royals	Truman	2 episodes
2016	Blunt Talk	Unknown	Episode: "Your Therapist and His Pussy Are Here"
2017	Elementary	Tom Saunders	Voice, episode: "Fidelity"; uncredited
2017	Training Day	Abel Cribbs	Episode: "Sunset"
2017	Get Shorty	Julian Pynter	Episode: "A Man of Letters"
2017	Designated Survivor	Dr. Rune	Episode: "Line of Fire"
2017-2021	The Tom and Jerry Show	Alistair	Voice, 3 episodes
2018	Modern Family	Malcolm Fennerman	Episode: "The Escape"
2019	A Confession	Judge Griffith Williams	Episode #1.6
2020	The Haunting of Bly Manor	Father Stack	Episode: "The Pupil"
2020	Big City Greens	Additional voices	Voice, 2 episodes
2021	Star Trek: Lower Decks	Commander Mandel	Voice, episode: "First First Contact"
2022	The Blacklist	Harris Gramercy	Episode: "Caelum Bank (N°169)"
2023	Captain Fall	Additional voices	Voice, episode: "An Unconventional Cruise Line"

=== Video games ===
Year	Title	Voice role	Notes
1995	Shannara	Leah Servant	
2001	The Lion King: Simba's Mighty Adventure	Zazu	
2002	The Lord of the Rings: The Fellowship of the Ring	Bilbo Baggins, Elrond	
2004	The Bard's Tale	Additional voices	
2004	Metal Gear Solid 3: Snake Eater	Major Zero	English dub
2006	Metal Gear Solid: Portable Ops	Major Zero	English dub
2010	The Lord of the Rings: Aragorn's Quest	Elrond, Bilbo Baggins	
2011	The Lord of the Rings: War in the North	Elrond, Bilbo Baggins	
2012	Lego The Lord of the Rings	Elrond, Bilbo Baggins	
2013	Scribblenauts Unmasked: A DC Comics Adventure	Alfred Pennyworth	
