= Matthew Dunster =

English theatre director, playwright and actor

Matthew Dunster is an English theatre director, playwright, and actor. He was the Associate Director of the Young Vic from 2005 to 2009 and the Associate Director of Shakespeare's Globe from 2015 to 2017. His production of Love and Money by Dennis Kelly was nominated for the Olivier Award for Outstanding Achievement in an Affiliate Theatre in 2006 and his production of Mogadishu by Vivienne Franzmann was nominated for that same award in 2012. In January 2016 Dunster was appointed as a patron to the Arts Educational Schools, London.

He was nominated for the Best Director award at the 2016 Oliviers' for Hangmen by Martin McDonagh.

== Directing credits ==
- Love and Money by Dennis Kelly at the Royal Exchange Theatre and Young Vic Theatre. (2006)
- You can see the Hills. Written and directed by Matthew Dunster at the Royal Exchange Theatre (2008)
- Macbeth. At the Royal Exchange Theatre * Macbeth with Nicholas Gleaves as Macbeth and Hilary MacClean as Lady Macbeth.( 2009)
- 1984. Adapted and directed by Matthew Dunster at the Royal Exchange Theatre.( 2010)
- Mogadishu by Vivienne Franzmann. World premiere at the Royal Exchange Theatre. (2011)
- Saturday Night and Sunday Morning. Adapted and directed by Matthew Dunster at the Royal Exchange Theatre. (2012)
- Hangmen by Martin McDonagh at the Royal Court Theatre transferred to Wyndham's Theatre, also Atlantic Theater Company and John Golden Theatre.
- Love's Sacrifice by John Ford at the RSC.
- The Seagull by Anton Chekhov at the Regent's Park Open Air Theatre.
- A Very Very Very Dark Matter by Martin McDonagh at the Bridge Theatre.
- 2:22: A Ghost Story by Danny Robins at the Noël Coward Theatre (2021) (also Gielgud Theatre, Criterion Theatre, Lyric Theatre, Apollo Theatre, UK and Ireland tour, Ahmanson Theatre, Los Angeles, Her Majesty's Theatre, Melbourne)
- Shirley Valentine by Willy Russell at the Duke of York's Theatre (2023)
- The Pillowman by Martin McDonagh at the Duke of York's Theatre (2023)
- Hedda by Henrik Ibsen, adapted by Matthew Dunster at the Ustinov Studio, Bath (2025)
- The Hunger Games: On Stage by Conor McPherson (2025)
- The Battle by John Niven at the Birmingham Repertory Theatre and UK tour (2026)

== Writing credits ==
- Children's Children
- You Can See the Hills
- Hedda (adapted from Hedda Gabler by Henrik Ibsen)
