= Another Country (play) =

Play written by Julian Mitchell

- Poster for the 1983 production starring Colin Firth
- Original language: English
- Written by: Julian Mitchell
- Characters: Guy Bennett; Tommy Judd; Barclay; Delahay; Donald Devenish; Fowler; James Harcourt
- Genre: Drama
- Setting: An English public school in the early 1930s

Premiere
- Date: 5 November 1981
- Place: Greenwich Theatre; London, England

Another Country is a 1981 British play written by English playwright Julian Mitchell. It premiered on 5 November 1981 at the Greenwich Theatre, London.

The play won the 1982 Laurence Olivier Award for Best New Play. The play takes its title from a lyric in the British patriotic hymn "I Vow to Thee, My Country." It has been described as a "hit play", and that "in the theatre business the play is a legend, having launched the careers of several notable actors in their first acting roles, including Kenneth Branagh, Rupert Everett, Daniel Day-Lewis and Colin Firth."

== Plot synopsis ==
Another Country is loosely based on the life of the spy Guy Burgess, renamed "Guy Bennett" in the play. It examines the effect the persecution of his orientation, and exposure to Marxism, has on his life, and the hypocrisy and snobbery of the English public school he attends. The setting is a 1930s public school where pupils Guy Bennett and Tommy Judd become friends because they are both outsiders. Bennett is gay, while Judd is a Marxist. Judd was based on John Cornford, who died fighting in the Spanish Civil War."

The play opens with the discovery that a pupil named Martineau has hanged himself after being caught by a teacher having sex with another boy. The first act follows the reaction of some of the students to his death as the senior boys try to keep the scandal away from both the parents and the outside world. Barclay, the Head of Gascoigne's House (which Martineau belonged to), moves towards a nervous breakdown, blaming himself for the boy's despair. Bennett, the only openly gay member of the school, pretends nonchalance but is deeply troubled by the suicide. His best friend Judd, the school's only Marxist, believes the death is a symptom of the school's oppressive regime.

When the parents of the aristocratic Devenish threaten to remove him from the school in light of the scandal, Fowler (a prefect) attempts to crack down on the perceived perversion in his House, and to persecute Bennett in particular. The other students initially defend Bennett's provocative and incendiary behaviour (partly due to Bennett's ability to blackmail them with knowledge of their own same-sex trysts). Meanwhile, Judd is reluctant to become a member of the school's exclusive 'Twenty-Two' society (a name which references Eton's 'Pop') himself. This is because he feels that this would endorse the school's system of oppression. However, he agrees to do so – after much pressure from his peers Menzies and Bennett – in the hope of preventing the hated Fowler from becoming Head of House in the wake of the Martineau scandal. But in the end, Judd's moral sacrifice is for nothing. In the second act, Fowler intercepts a letter from Bennett to his lover Harcourt, and Bennett's supporters fade away. Bennett is beaten, Judd is humiliated, and it is Devenish who is ultimately invited to join 'Twenty-Two' in the place of Bennett, shattering Bennett's childhood dream.

In the play's closing scene, Bennett and Judd recognise that the school's illusory hold upon them has been broken and that the British class system relies strongly on outward appearances. They begin to contemplate life anew, inspired by the example of Devenish's rebellious uncle, Vaughan Cunningham (who, in a subplot, visits the school). Bennett picks up Judd's copy of Das Kapital, and muses, 'Wouldn't it be wonderful if all this was true?’

== Productions ==
The original 1981 Greenwich Theatre production featured Rupert Everett as Guy Bennett and Joshua Le Touzel as Tommy Judd. Other cast members included Piers Flint-Shipman (Devenish), David Parfitt (Menzies), Michael Parkhouse (Fowler), Christopher Villiers (Sanderson), Matthew Solon (Barclay), Simon Dutton (Delahay), Gary Carp (Wharton), and David Wiliam (Vaughan Cunningham). The play transferred to the Queen's Theatre in the West End in March 1982, where Kenneth Branagh took the role of Judd. After the first six months, Daniel Day-Lewis took over the role of Guy Bennett, and in 1983 the role of Guy Bennett was played by Colin Firth. The play won the Society of West End Theatre Awards Play of the Year title for 1982.

The U.S. premiere of the play took place in January 1983 at the Long Wharf Theatre in New Haven, Connecticut. It starred Peter Gallagher as Guy Bennett and Peter MacNicol as Tommy Judd. Also in the cast were Tait Ruppert, Albert Macklin, Owen Thompson, Tyrone Power, Mark Moses, Rob Gomes, Robert Byron Allen, and Edmond Genest. John Tillinger directed.

The play has developed a strong connection with Oxford Playhouse, which revived it in 2000 in a new production directed by Stephen Henry (transferred to the Arts Theatre, Westminster, from September 2000 until January 2001). It was revived again at Oxford Playhouse in February 2013 by OUDS-supported University of Oxford student company Screw the Looking Glass.

In September 2013, a co-production of Theatre Royal, Bath and Chichester Festival Theatre, directed by Jeremy Herrin, transferred to London's Trafalgar Studios in 2014. That production featured Rob Callender and Will Attenborough as Guy and Tommy, respectively.

== Adaptations ==
In 1984, the play was adapted into a movie directed by Marek Kanievska and starring Rupert Everett as Guy Bennett and Colin Firth as Tommy Judd. The film also starred Michael Jenn (Barclay), Robert Addie (Delahay), Rupert Wainwright (Donald Devenish), Tristan Oliver (Fowler), Cary Elwes (James Harcourt), Piers Flint-Shipman (Menzies) and Anna Massey (Imogen Bennett).

The play was adapted for radio and broadcast on BBC Radio 4 Extra on 26 May 2013 as part of BBC Radio 4 Extra's Cambridge Spies season, starring Tom Hiddleston as Tommy Judd.
