= Family Tree (TV series) =

- Genre: Comedy; Mockumentary
- Created by: Christopher Guest; Jim Piddock
- Written by: Christopher Guest; Jim Piddock
- Directed by: Christopher Guest
- Starring: Chris O'Dowd
- Countries of origin: United States; United Kingdom
- Original language: English
- No. of series: 1
- No. of episodes: 8

Production
- Executive producers: Christopher Guest; Jim Piddock; Karen Murphy; Deborah Oppenheimer; Mario Stylianides
- Camera setup: Single
- Running time: 30 minutes
- Production companies: HBO; Crystal Palace Entertainment; Lucky Giant; Pale Morning Dun Industries; NBCUniversal International Studios; BBC

Original release
- Network: HBO; BBC Two
- Release: 12 May – 8 July 2013

Family Tree is a mockumentary television comedy created by Christopher Guest and Jim Piddock. The series premiered on 12 May 2013, on the American pay television network HBO, and appeared on the British channel BBC Two in July 2013. Guest, Piddock, Karen Murphy, Deborah Oppenheimer, and Mario Stylianides serve as the show's executive producers.

On 23 January 2014, it was announced that HBO had cancelled the series.

== Cast ==
Chadwick Family

- Chris O'Dowd as Tom Chadwick, a young man investigating his lineage.
- Nina Conti as Bea Chadwick/Monkey, Tom's sister who uses a hand puppet named "Monk" to communicate her feelings after an embarrassing incident with a puffin in her childhood.
- Michael McKean as Keith Chadwick, Tom's father who loves old British situation comedies.
- Lisa Palfrey as Luba Chadwick, Keith's Moldovan wife who is extremely eccentric.
- Christopher Guest as David Chadwick, one of Tom's relatives from North Carolina. He claims to have a vestigial tail (which is hereditary). David had a wife who disappeared under mysterious circumstances three years prior to the events of the series. Guest also plays Phineas Chadwick, David's grandfather who was a musician, art collector, actor and baseball player.
- Ed Begley Jr. as Dr. Al Chadwick, Tom's third uncle. He lives in Glendale, California with his wife Kitty. He is a podiatrist (his father's profession also) and is trained in Native American survival tactics. He and his wife love R&B music. He is obsessed with the fact that Charles Chadwick left America just two days after Abraham Lincoln's assassination and is a paranoid conspiracy theorist. Also appears to be wearing a Masonic ring—which would normally indicate a Masonic tie of some sort.
- Carrie Aizley as Kitty Chadwick, Al's wife, whom he met when he contacted her from a phone number on a public toilet cubicle. She is dimwitted and ignorant about English culture. She is the inventor of a series of flavored enemas.
- Christian Rodska as Graham Chadwick, Keith's cousin who lives in Derbyshire on a farm.
- Adam James as Ronnie Chadwick, Tom's second cousin who lives and works on a farm in Derbyshire.
- Susan Earl as Emma Chadwick, Ronnie's wife.
- Kevin Pollak as Marty Schmelff, one of Tom's relatives who owns a store in Barstow, California. He is related to Tom by Charles Chadwick's marriage to Rebecca Schmelff, a member of a Jewish family in Barstow.
- Bob Balaban as Melvin Schmelff, Tom's uncle. He is an admirer of his grandfather, Ezra Schmelff, who was a famous Western film actor. Balaban also plays Ezra.

Other Characters

- Tom Bennett as Pete Stupples, Tom's immature best friend who works at a zoo in London.
- Jim Piddock as Glenn Pfister, the eccentric South African owner of "Mr Pfister's Bits & Bobs", an antique and collectibles store in London.
- Annabel Scholey as Lucy Pfister, a baker and daughter of Mr Pfister. She was recently engaged to be married, but has since split with her (now) ex-fiancé.
- Fred Willard as Mike Morton, Al's crude neighbour. He is a lover of magic. It is revealed in the season finale that he is openly gay, and lives with his partner Kim (Michael Mantell).
- Matt Griesser as Rick Tillman, Tom's cousin in California. He is a lover of Civil War re-enactments. He lives in Redondo Beach with his girlfriend Julie.
- Maria Blasucci as Julie Fenneman, Rick's girlfriend.
- Don Lake as Harvey Krupp, Rick's friend who is a Civil War aficionado.
- Barbara Bolton as Mildred Budgens, the best friend and roommate of Tom's great-aunt Victoria who imparts valuable knowledge to Tom about Victoria.
- Graham Greene as Chief Running Bull, a resident of a Native American reserve in Barstow.
- Saginaw Grant as White Feather, a resident of a Native American reserve in Barstow and friend to Chief Running Bull.
- Amy Seimetz as Ally Keele, Tom's love interest whom he meets after he defends her against a man (Will Sasso) in a car accident.
- Ben Farrow as Race Course Announcer, who provides the commentary on the pantomime horse race.

== Production ==
The series is written by Guest and Piddock and directed by Guest. The dialogue is improvised by the actors. The show's first series consisted of 8 episodes. Filming took place in London and Los Angeles.

The closing credits song "I'm Alone But That's OK" is performed by Ron Sexsmith and was written for the series by Christopher Guest and Harlan Collins.

== Running jokes ==
Oddball inventions: Tom's father has invented a shoe tree that can cool or heat up a shoe; a woman whom Tom and Pete meet has invented a glass, attached around her aged mother's neck, that allows her to see if she's still breathing. Kitty Chadwick has invented flavoured enemas.

Awkward dates: Pete sets up Tom on bad first dates. One woman declares that dinosaurs still exist; another is obsessed with bones.

Eccentric hobbies, quirks and obsessions: Tom's sister Bea uses a hand puppet that tends to blurt out sentiments best left unspoken. Tom often talks to neighbour Mr. Pfister, an antique-store owner trying to make "landmarks in a bottle" when he's not checking the website "Is It Fatal?" to see if he suffers from a life-threatening disease. In the first episode, Pfister sends Tom on to Neville St Aubrey, a manic-looking antique photo expert whom Pfister calls "as mad as a box of frogs". In California, Julie, Tom's cousin Rick's girlfriend, is obsessed with owls — she collects owl figurines and owl pillows and draws owls in a notebook. Rick is preoccupied with Civil War re-enactments.

British TV: Tom's father loves to watch DVDs of (fictional) British sitcoms, full of broad stereotypes and Carry On-like humour. One, There Goes The Neighbourhood, features an Alf Garnett-like Anglo-Indian. Another, set in a police station, is called Move Along, Please! Tom sees a bit of The Plantagenets, a Tudors-like historical drama, while Pete likes to watch "the new Sherlock Holmes," which parodies Star Trek and is called Sherlock Holmes: The New Frontier.

== Episodes ==
No.	Title	Directed by	Written by	Original release date	US viewers (millions)
1	"The Box"	Christopher Guest	Christopher Guest & Jim Piddock	12 May 2013	0.79
Tom Chadwick and his sister Bea find out from their father that a great-aunt, Victoria, has died. An old picture in the box of things that she's left for Tom sends him on a search, accompanied by his pal Pete, to discover the identity of the man in the photograph. Note: Trisha Paytas makes an appearance in this episode.
2	"Treading the Boards"	Christopher Guest	Christopher Guest & Jim Piddock	19 May 2013	0.47
Tom learns that his great-grandfather, Harry Chadwick, was an actor and visits Hove, where he performed. He and Pete decide to run a kind of race in honour of Harry's famous comic act.
3	"The Austerity Games"	Christopher Guest	Christopher Guest & Jim Piddock	2 June 2013	0.50
After discovering grandfather William was on the GB team in the cash-poor 1948 Olympics, Tom hears about his and Victoria's athletic feats from a close friend she bequeathed her flat to; he learns that William and Victoria had a brother, Brian. Bea and Monkey try performing. His great-great-grandfather Charles, Tom finds, was born in the USA.
4	"Country Life"	Christopher Guest	Christopher Guest & Jim Piddock	9 June 2013	0.47
Along with Bea, his father, and Luba, Tom visits his cousins in rural Derbyshire and learns why they have red hair. His American cousins in California invite him to visit.
5	"Welcome to America"	Christopher Guest	Christopher Guest & Jim Piddock	16 June 2013	0.54
Tom stays in Glendale with his American cousins Al and Kitty Chadwick, who host an extended-family BBQ. Dave Chadwick, visiting from North Carolina, reveals a record of Charles Chadwick's departure for England on April 16, 1865.
6	"Civil War"	Christopher Guest	Christopher Guest & Jim Piddock	23 June 2013	0.41
After learning that Charles had both Union and Confederate uniforms, Tom gets into some petty skirmishes during a Civil War re-enactment.
7	"Indians"	Christopher Guest	Christopher Guest & Jim Piddock	30 June 2013	0.55
Tom, Bea, and Pete drive to Barstow, where they find that great-great-grandmother Rebecca was not Native American, as Tom had thought.
8	"Cowboys"	Christopher Guest	Christopher Guest & Jim Piddock	7 July 2013	0.56
Tom learns more about his Jewish ancestor, Bea has a breakdown on the beach when she loses Monkey, and Tom has to say goodbye to Ally as his departure from Los Angeles approaches.

== Reception ==
Sam Wollaston in The Guardian wrote that the show "simply isn't very good. It's not bad, it's just kind of all right. [...] I watched the second episode too. Same same, still no surprises, or lols, or any sort of laughs really."

Gerard O'Donovan in The Daily Telegraph felt that it "was fine, if not very funny, except when Guest's trademark style came into play and we were expected to believe a TV crew was following Tom around, interviewing him and his pals. Uh, why? Guest's previous films focused on subjects about which documentaries actually do get made – rock groups, dog shows, folk festivals. But a sad, under-motivated nobody pointlessly – and not very credibly – indulging his random curiosity? It just didn't work."

Tom Gliatto, television critic for People, awarded Family Tree 3 and 1/2 stars, observing that it was "still a distinctly Guest production: often poky, always charmingly whimsical and, from time to time, so astoundingly funny you seem to have shot into a distant stratosphere of pure comedy."

Tim Goodman of The Hollywood Reporter felt "the half-hour show works its magic the patented Guest way: by slowly, with pinpoint accuracy, drilling down into the absurdist ways of ordinary people. The series works on multiple levels, but clearly one is O'Dowd's charm. [...] Here's hoping HBO lets Family Tree grow for many seasons."

Rob Sheffield of Rolling Stone called the show "the kind of brilliant achievement only Christopher Guest could attempt, in his signature style of documentary footage and improvised dialogue, loaded with eccentric clods bumbling into moments of sublimely awkward truth."

Robert Lloyd, television critic for the Los Angeles Times, observed that "Christopher Guest's poignantly comical HBO series bears the director's distinctively eccentric marks." He added, "Guest gives the world a quarter-twist toward the ridiculous, without losing sight of the human dreams and strivings, obsessions and accommodations that are his main and constant subject."

Mike Hale of The New York Times wrote, "As in Mr. Guest's films, its story is less important than the presentation of a gallery of eccentrics, ranging from mildly odd to completely loony." He continued, "The so far quiet and modest vibe of the show may shift as well. In any case, more members of the Guest ensemble, including Ed Begley Jr. and Fred Willard, will appear, which can only be a good thing."

Alan Sepinwall, who reviewed the show for HitFix, opined that "the most impressive thing about Family Tree [is] it invites you to laugh at all these kooks in a way that doesn't feel mean-spirited, and it takes parts of its hero's journey quite seriously."

Metacritic gives the series a rating of 74%, indicating "generally favorable", based on reviews from 28 critics.
