= Traces of Red =

1992 American film by Andy Wolk

- Theatrical release poster
- Directed by: Andy Wolk
- Written by: Jim Piddock
- Produced by: Mark Gordon; David V. Picker
- Starring: James Belushi; Lorraine Bracco; Tony Goldwyn; William Russ
- Cinematography: Tim Suhrstedt
- Edited by: Trudy Ship
- Music by: Graeme Revell
- Distributed by: The Samuel Goldwyn Company
- Release date: November 13, 1992
- Running time: 105 minutes
- Country: United States
- Language: English
- Box office: $3,206,714

Traces of Red is a 1992 neo noir erotic thriller film, directed by Andy Wolk, and starring James Belushi, Lorraine Bracco, and Tony Goldwyn.

== Plot ==
Jack Dobson, a homicide detective from Palm Beach, lays flat on his back with a bullet in his chest. Flashbacks show the events that led him to this fate. Jack has been receiving threatening letters. He and his partner Steve Frayn conclude that the source must be Tony Garidi, a mob figure whom Jack is about to testify against in court. But another possibility is that someone could be causing trouble for Jack's brother, Michael, who is in an election campaign for public office.

Women begin turning up dead with lipstick traces left by the killer. A woman Jack has begun seeing, Ellen Schofield, could be involved. When Ellen sees Jack leave a restaurant with a woman who soon becomes a victim, suspicion is cast toward Jack himself as the killer. Jack eventually reveals that he was raped as a child by his former first grade teacher, Gloria Wurtz. While speaking with Michael, Steve learns that Jack was actually molested by their mother Louise.

Steve decides to go forward with his own investigation but, in the process, winds up having sex with Ellen, much to his wife Beth's (who he earlier celebrated his seventh wedding anniversary with) and Jack's (who now sees him as a traitor) dismay. After Ellen turns up dead, Jack decides to take Beth with him to a secluded getaway home, immediately following Steve confiding in Jack that he trusted him. After finding evidence that Jack is indeed the killer, Steve and Michael rush to the getaway home where Jack and Beth are.

Jack is holding Beth and is seemingly about to strangle her when Steve yells at Jack to freeze. Jack pushes Beth aside and draws his gun but is shot by Steve before he can get off a shot. Eventually, Michael is revealed to be the real killer. Jack's murder was faked, as he wanted to give Michael a false sense of security that he was dead. Michael is set up to seemingly be alone with Jack's friend Amanda in a hotel room. After he attempts to strangle Amanda, Steve bursts into the room with his gun drawn and tells Michael to freeze. It is then revealed that Jack is not dead, much to Michael's shock. Jack tells Steven and Amanda to leave the room so that he can talk to his brother alone. As they are embracing, Michael manages to take Jack's gun and commits suicide by shooting himself in the temple.

== Cast ==
- James Belushi as Detective Jack Dobson
- Lorraine Bracco as Ellen Schofield
- Tony Goldwyn as Detective Steve Frayn
- Joe Lisi as Lieutenant J.C. Hooks
- William Russ as Michael Dobson
- Faye Grant as Beth Frayn
- Michelle Joyner as Morgan Cassidy
- Victoria Bass as Susan Dobson
- Melanie Tomlin as Amanda
- Jim Piddock as Mr. Martyn
- Ed Amatrudo as Emilio
- Danny Kamin as Prosecutor Dan Ayeroff
- Harriet Grinnell as Louise Dobson
- Lindsey Jayde Sapp as Nancy Frayn
- Mario Ernesto Sánchez as Tony Garidi
- Joe Hess as Rudy "Minnesota" Garidi
- Will Knickerbocker as Tommy Hawkins
- Edgar Allan Poe IV as Ian Wicks
- Billy Garrigues as Phillip Norris
- Katherine Culliver as Kimberly Davis
- Renate Schlesinger as Ingrid

== Production ==
Lorraine Bracco used a body double for a nude scene.

== Reception ==
The film was released theatrically by The Samuel Goldwyn Company on November 13, 1992. After the limited theatrical release in the United States, the film became a surprise hit in the United States home video market; the film made 224.8% more revenue on home video than it did in theaters.

Bracco's performances in the film and Medicine Man earned her a nomination for the Golden Raspberry Award for Worst Actress at the 13th Golden Raspberry Awards.
