= See This Movie =

2004 film by David M. Rosenthal

- Directed by: David Rosenthal
- Written by: David Rosenthal; Joseph M. Smith
- Produced by: Joseph M. Smith
- Starring: Seth Meyers; John Cho; Jessalyn Gilsig; Jessica Paré; Jim Piddock
- Cinematography: Richard Rutkowski
- Edited by: Conor O'Neill
- Music by: Daniel Cage
- Distributed by: Slamdance on the Road; Allumination Home Entertainment
- Release date: March 3, 2004 (Aspen US Comedy Arts Festival)
- Running time: 83 minutes
- Countries: United States; Canada
- Language: English

See This Movie is a 2004 comedy film written by David M. Rosenthal and Joseph Matthew Smith, and directed by Rosenthal. The film stars Seth Meyers and John Cho, and also features Jessica Paré, Jim Piddock, and Jessalyn Gilsig, with cameo appearances by Patton Oswalt, Miguel Arteta, and the film's executive producers Chris Weitz and Paul Weitz.

The plot revolves around two inept filmmakers who con their way into the Montreal World Film Festival with a movie that does not exist.

The entire film was shot in only thirteen days, in Los Angeles and in Montreal during and with the cooperation of the actual 2003 Montreal World Film Festival. Festival organizers gave the filmmakers access to all festival events and locations, and even programmed a screening for the film-within-a-film during which festival-goers screened an assembly cut of the film, and got to "play" the audience in the screening scene as it was being shot.

== Plot ==
After graduating from a three-day film school, 29-year-old aspiring filmmaker Jake Barrymore and classmate Larry Finkelstein recognise Jake's ex-girlfriend, Annie, as the Montreal World Film Festival programmer. Jake decides to go there with a new movie of theirs, to be made in the next three weeks. Larry, less optimistic about the plan, agrees to produce whilst Jake calls Annie to tell her that he has finally directed a groundbreaking film for her to premiere. Annie is however unable to take the film unless it is sent immediately, hanging up. Jake pretends to continue the conversation and tells Larry that Annie has accepted their film.

The two approach their film school teacher Martin with their film idea, a dramatic mockumentary. Jake convinces him to edit their film, assuring that they indeed have a place in the festival and that he will not screw over Martin. To convince Annie to screen his film, Jake claims that he is dying from a tumour in his head.

Jake, Larry, Martin and an actress Samantha, arrive in Montreal and meet up with Annie. Annie asks for the film, to which Larry lies that they’d sent it overnight. Jake admits he was lying about his tumour, but programs have already been printed so Annie is forced to go through with their premiere, telling Jake to stick with the lie to everyone he encounters. Checking into the festival, they find out they have also been assigned to participate in a symposium.

Jake continues to audition for the cast, whilst Martin questions Jake's actual plan, which is to shoot a few key scenes (fight, love, and redemption), then improvise the rest of the film. Martin kisses Jake, coming out as bisexual, and is rejected.

Production is plagued by Jake's ego, a lack of planning, and the festival chasing them for the film itself. Larry steals a random tape and hands it in as their film, whilst Samantha pretends to be in a relationship with Jake to make Annie jealous.

At a party, a drunk Samantha kisses Jake, who abandons her to try and fail to win Annie back. Samantha then kisses Martin, who ensures footage is captured of it. Jake reacts negatively to the footage, claiming it isn't professional. The next day before shooting a scene, Samantha offers an irate Jake some drugs, under the guise of Vitamin E, to relax him. Meanwhile, Larry confides in Martin about his discomfort and stress as a first-time producer. Jake, now very high, shoots his scene, making out with Samantha for several takes. Afterwards, Jake and Larry arrive late for their symposium. Jake rambles passionately about filmmaking and death, to which the audience responds positively. Jake and Annie reconcile that night and have sex only for Jake to prematurely finish.

Jake apologises to Annie the next day at a bar, where she reveals she is not as serious about reconciling as he was. Jake then follows Samantha outside, leaving Annie frustrated. She then kisses and has sex with Martin. Outside, Jake confronts Sam, who is with her drug dealer, about the nature of their relationship after their love scene, and is rejected. Jake wanders the streets of Montreal. Larry tells Martin to never tell Jake about him and Annie.

The next day, before shooting their final scene, Samantha tells Jake she's leaving, criticising Jake's directing style, and revealing that she came to Montreal to sell drugs. Jake blackmails Samantha into staying. Whilst shooting a fight scene, Samantha's drug dealer interrupts the scene, getting into a real fight with the cast and crew. Martin knocks him out, and Samantha, attracted to this, kisses him. Jake gets angry at Martin for ruining the fight scene, who in retaliation reveals that he had sex with Annie. Jake fires Martin, then apologises to Annie, who convinces him to keep Martin.

After being unable to find Martin, Jake, Larry and Annie meet up outside their screening, where Jake reveals to Annie that the film does not exist. Jake speaks to the audience about his insecurities as a filmmaker and as a friend, apologising for failing to have a film. To his surprise, Martin from the projection room begins screening a film: footage of the making of Jake's initial film, proceeded by an introduction of himself accepting Jake's humility.

Jake and Larry watch the positive reception from outside the cinema. Jake wonders why Martin stayed, and Larry reveals he had sex with him. Annie tells Jake that her colleagues are intrigued by the film and that she may get a promotion, and agrees to reconcile with Jake so long as he stops making more films.

== Cast ==
- Seth Meyers as Jake Barrymore
- John Cho as Larry Finkelstein
- Jim Piddock as Martin Hughes
- Jessalyn Gilsig as Annie Nicole
- Jessica Paré as Samantha
- Rylan Wilkie as Todd Stone
- Patton Oswalt as Felix
- Raymond O'Connor as the Manager

== Awards ==
- Winner of the 2004 Malibu Film Festival Best of the Festival
- Winner of the 2004 Malibu Film Festival Andy Dick Film Scholarship Award
- Official Selection of the 2004 Sedona Film Festival
- Official Selection of the 2004 U.S. Comedy Arts Festival
