= Piers Flint-Shipman =

English actor (1962–1984)

- Born: Piers F. A. Flint-Shipman; 23 January 1962
- Died: 2 June 1984 (aged 22); France
- Occupation: Actor

Piers Frederick Alexander Flint-Shipman (23 January 1962 – 2 June 1984) was a 20th-century English actor.

== Early life ==
He was the son of film producer Gerald Flint-Shipman, and received his formal education at Ampleforth College.

== Career ==
Along with theatrical appearances he also performed in several television series and cinema films from the mid-1970's. He sometimes used the stage name Frederick Alexander, his middle two names.

== Death ==
Flint-Shipman was killed in his 23rd year in a road traffic collision in France, when his car was hit by another driver intent upon suicide.

== Personal life ==
He was the brother of the painter Andrew Flint-Shipman, and was a friend of the actor Rupert Everett.

== Filmography ==
- Fall of Eagles (1974)
- The Flight Fund (1975) (TV)
- Love Among the Artists (1979)
- To Serve Them All My Days (1980)
- Country: A Tory Story (1981) (TV)
- Floating Off (1983) (TV)
- Good and Bad at Games (1983) (TV)
- Another Country (1984)
