= Amos & Andrew =

1993 film by E. Max Frye

- Theatrical release poster
- Directed by: E. Max Frye
- Written by: E. Max Frye
- Produced by: Gary Goetzman
- Starring: Nicolas Cage; Samuel L. Jackson; Michael Lerner; Margaret Colin; Brad Dourif; Dabney Coleman
- Cinematography: Walt Lloyd
- Edited by: Jane Kurson
- Music by: Richard Gibbs
- Production companies: Castle Rock Entertainment; New Line Cinema
- Distributed by: Columbia Pictures
- Release date: March 5, 1993
- Running time: 95 minutes
- Country: United States
- Languages: English; Spanish
- Box office: $9.7 million

Amos & Andrew is a 1993 American buddy action-comedy film directed and written by E. Max Frye and starring Nicolas Cage and Samuel L. Jackson. The film's title parodies that of the sitcom Amos 'n' Andy, while the premise is akin to that of The Defiant Ones. Shot in and around Wilmington, North Carolina in early 1992, the film concerns wealthy African-American playwright Andrew Sterling's (Jackson) purchase of a summer home on a predominantly white island and the problems that arise when he is mistaken for a criminal. It was released by Columbia Pictures on March 5, 1993 to box office failure, grossing just under $10 million domestically, and receiving generally negative reviews from critics.

== Plot ==
Andrew Sterling, a successful black urbanite playwright, buys a vacation home on a resort island in Massachusetts. Two of his new neighbors, the Gillmans, mistake him for a burglar and call the police, unaware of the previous owners' departure. Andrew goes outside to shut off his car alarm, where he is met with gunfire from the police. Reporters arrive and interview Chief Tolliver, who calls Andrew on the phone to apologize for his mistake. To avoid the bad publicity, Tolliver offers Amos Odell, a thief in his jail, a deal: he will be granted free passage out of town if he breaks into Andrew's home, holds the writer hostage, and gives himself up. Armed with a shotgun, Amos enters the house and ties up Andrew, who believes Amos is an assassin sent to kill him due to his published views against "white America".

Tolliver calls Amos to release Andrew as soon as the press mobbing the house is in place, promising to leave Amos' identity out of the news. While Amos waits, he turns on the television to find his name and face all over the news. With his deal broken, Amos steps outside and demands a ransom for the famous author. Tolliver comes in the back door demanding Amos's surrender and reveals his opposition to Andrew living on the island. During a scuffle, Andrew hits the Chief unconscious with his frying pan and goes for the shotgun. Amos takes the gun back and tells Andrew he will remain his hostage.

Amos cuffs himself to Andrew and runs with him through the backwoods until they enter the Gillmans' home, where he takes the Gillmans hostage as well. Tolliver, now free from captivity, once again demands Amos surrender, believing he is still somewhere in Andrew's home. He also declares he will prosecute Andrew on assault charges, so Amos reveals his two new hostages. Awaiting the ransom, Amos and Andrew watch the Gillmans' news interview, explaining how the incident started. A pizza Amos ordered arrives at the Gillman home, and Amos gives the delivery girl the Gillmans' and Tolliver's interview tape. He then steals the key to the Gillmans' car and invites Andrew to join him as his partner in crime, which disgusts Andrew.

Andrew's home is set on fire during a struggle between the police and the crowd. The pizza girl returns the interview tape to the reporters. Tolliver sends out a man with his two bloodhounds to find Andrew, and Amos, as he is chased through a field, rescues Andrew. Andrew uses Tolliver's wallet, which Amos had taken from him, and sics the bloodhounds on Tolliver using the new scent. During the interview, the reporters reveal they know the truth about the incident. As Tolliver realizes he no longer possesses the tape of his interview, the two bloodhounds chase him away.

Amos and Andrew meet up with the latter's wife on a barge, and the two men part ways as friends. Amos attempts to flee to Canada but turns onto Interstate 95, unknowingly going in the wrong direction.

== Cast ==
- Nicolas Cage as Amos Odell
- Samuel L. Jackson as Andrew Sterling
- Dabney Coleman as Police Chief Cecil Tolliver
- Brad Dourif as Officer Donnie Donaldson
- Michael Lerner as Phil Gillman
- Margaret Colin as Judy Gillman
- Giancarlo Esposito as Reverend Fenton Brunch
- Bob Balaban as Dr. R.A. "Roy" Fink
- Tracey Walter as Bob "Bloodhound Bob"
- Jodi Long as Wendy Wong
- Ron Taylor as Sherman
- Chelcie Ross as Earl
- Loretta Devine as Ula
- Aimee Graham as Stacy

== Reception ==
Roger Ebert gave the film two out of four stars, writing that Amos & Andrew "is not bad so much as misguided" due to its comedic treatment of issues such as racism, racial injustice and police brutality, suggesting that "the movie needs to be either more innocent about race in America, or less. It portrays an unpleasant situation and then treats it with sitcom tactics. Either the humor should have been angrier and more hard-edged, or the filmmakers should have backed away from the situation altogether." Vincent Canby also felt the film was like a sitcom, writing that "[the film's] roots are not in life but in other, better movies and sitcoms."

In 2016, Nathan Rabin wrote, "for two surprisingly solid acts at least, Amos & Andrew is a sometimes scathing, sometimes funny exploration of the intersection of class and race and the way racism works in our society that feels like it could have been ripped from today’s headlines" but that "the film’s deflating third act largely eschews satire and social commentary for the much cheaper, more audience-friendly terrain of the plot-driven mismatched buddy comedy. That’s a shame, because in its early going, Amos and Andrew is unusually incisive in its depiction of the intersection of class and race, especially for a studio comedy."
