= Where the Money Is =

2000 American comedy-drama film

- Theatrical release poster
- Directed by: Marek Kanievska
- Screenplay by: E. Max Frye; Topper Lilien; Carroll Cartwright
- Story by: E. Max Frye
- Produced by: Chris Dorr; Ridley Scott; Charles Weinstock; Chris Zarpas
- Starring: Paul Newman; Linda Fiorentino; Dermot Mulroney
- Cinematography: Thomas Burstyn
- Edited by: Garth Craven; Samuel Craven; Dan Lebental
- Music by: Mark Isham
- Production companies: Gramercy Pictures; PolyGram Filmed Entertainment (uncredited); Intermedia Films; Pacifica Film Distribution; Scott Free Productions; IMF
- Distributed by: USA Films
- Release date: April 14, 2000
- Running time: 89 minutes
- Country: United States
- Language: English
- Budget: $28 million
- Box office: $7 million

Where the Money Is is a 2000 American crime comedy-drama film directed by Marek Kanievska, written by E. Max Frye, and starring Paul Newman, Linda Fiorentino and Dermot Mulroney. The film, a box office failure, was Newman's second-to-last live-action theatrical release, though he would continue doing award-winning voice-over and live action television work for a number of years. It has also to date been Fiorentino's last theatrically released film. The title is taken from a saying attributed to the bank robber Willie Sutton.

== Plot ==
Professional thief Henry Manning is in an Oregon nursing home's care. Having apparently had a massive stroke, he is immobile and mute. Henry is in the care of Carol Ann McKay, a high school prom queen who married her boyfriend Wayne, the prom king and star of her school's football team.

Carol Ann is mesmerized by the fact that Henry was such a successful bank robber, having eluded the police for 30 years. But she starts to suspect Henry isn't as sick as he seems. She attempts to get a rise out of him by doing a lap dance, but fails. So convinced is she that Henry is faking, she gives him the ultimate test, pushing Henry and his wheelchair off a pier into the water, defying him to swim or die.

Wayne arrives just as this is happening and dives in after him, but a few moments later, Henry walks out of the lake and obviously has to admit he's been faking it to both of them. Exposed as a fraud, Henry is at least relieved to be able to walk and talk again. They take him to a local bar to hear his explanation.

Preferring a nursing home to prison as a means of escape, Henry had studied yoga and vajrayana as a way to fake the symptoms of a stroke. Soon he is dancing and drinking with them. When the couple are distracted dancing, Henry sneaks off with Wayne's car.

The next day, Henry is once again back at the home, to Carol's surprise. She continues to sporadically take him out. One day soon thereafter, Carol approaches Henry with the idea of robbing the local bank. Henry tells her she has lost her mind, but soon afterwards, he changes his mind.

The plan soon morphs into an armored transport heist with Henry coaching Carol in how to case the armoured vehicles out. Wayne gets suspicious so she lets him think she'd planned on his participation all along. They each have specific roles in the upcoming event. Although the night-long heist hits a couple rough spots, it is successful.

The next day, Henry is scheduled to be transferred back to prison. Carol Ann feels bad for him, intercepts the transfer, and breaks him free. Upon arriving home to pick up Wayne, Carol and Henry discover Wayne has sold them out.

As the police surround the house, Wayne walks out the front door to give himself up. Moments later, Henry and Carol bust out the back in Wayne's car. Henry drops Carol off in the middle of the woods to get away on foot with the loot, and as the police are pursuing him, he drives Wayne's car into a lake and is presumed dead, leaving Wayne to take the fall.

In the final scene, Henry and Carol Ann are shown at a jewelry store whose security system mysteriously stopped working. She convinces the sole sales assistant to cut off her wedding ring in the back room with Henry left out front, using a wheelchair to pretend to be unable to walk again and preparing for a new heist.

== Cast ==
- Paul Newman as Henry Manning
- Linda Fiorentino as Carol Ann McKay
- Dermot Mulroney as Wayne
- Susan Barnes as Mrs. Foster
- Anne Pitoniak as Mrs. Tetlow
- Bruce MacVittie as Karl
- Irma St. Paule as Mrs. Galer
- Michel Perron as Guard
- Dorothy Gordon as Mrs. Norton
- Rita Tuckett as Mrs. Weiler
- Diane Amos as Kitty
- Dawn Ford as Cheryl, Wife #2
- T.J. Kenneally as Farwell Welk
- Rod McLachlan as Lloyd, The Cop
- Bill Corday as Grounds Worker
- Gordon McCall as Handyman
- Charles S. Doucet as Tom
- Arthur Holden as Bob
- Frank Fontaine as Cop
- Richard Jutras as Manager
- Frankie Faison as Security Guard
- Vlasta Vrána as Jewelry Store Employee
- Heather Hiscox as TV Announcer
- Michael Brockman as FBI Agent

== Reception ==
On the review aggregator website Rotten Tomatoes, 48% of 79 critics' reviews are positive, with an average rating of 5.3/10. The website's consensus reads: "The acting in Where the Money Is is excellent. However, the movie feels like a made-for-TV movie that's plain and forgettable." Metacritic, which uses a weighted average, assigned the film a score of 49 out of 100, based on 31 critics, indicating "mixed or average" reviews. Audiences polled by CinemaScore gave the film a grade "B−" on a scale of A to F.

Roger Ebert wrote that it "has a preposterous plot, but it's not about a plot, it's about acting. It's about how Paul Newman at 75 is still cool, sleek and utterly self-confident, and about how Linda Fiorentino's low, calm voice sneaks in under his cover and challenges him in places he is glad to be reminded of. Watching these two working together is like watching a couple of thoroughbreds going around a track. You know they'll end up back where they started and you don't even have any money on the race, but God, what form." Jay Carr of The Boston Globe said that "the film never drags, but one of the enjoyable things about it is its way of taking its time letting us get to know and savor the characters", adding that "The test of any caper movie is whether you like the crooks enough to root for them. This one aces the test effortlessly as Newman and Fiorentino project more than enough charm to melt any mere armored car." Ann Hornaday of the Baltimore Sun wrote:

"Where the Money Is" is devoid of that ineffable quality Hollywood calls "edge" (a polite term for gratuitous blood and profanity). Instead it's just another modest, unsurprising little heist flick, directed with too much self-conscious visual style and too many contrivances by ad-man Marek Kanievska. So why is it so much fun? Why do Fiorentino and Mulroney, both appealing actors but neither at their best here, seem to shine in some greater reflected light? Why will audiences walk out of the theater oddly cheered and satisfied? The answer, lady, is in your purse.

More mixed in his writings was Kevin Thomas of the Los Angeles Times. He wrote that "Caper comedies—films that take a humorous approach to the old heist plot—are not exactly the rage, but director Marek Kanievska and his writers don't take into account that we're not still in the '60s. The only way the film could have had a prayer of working—and thereby tapping its stars' considerable strengths—is by taking a much harder edge and going for dark, even bleak humor. Instead, they turn the picture into a kind of good-natured romp." Elvis Mitchell of The New York Times called the film "a mild caper comedy that seriously trades on the audience's relationship to its star, Paul Newman" while noting that "sadly, the subtext and context of 'Money' is that everyone's better days are a distant memory." William Arnold of the Seattle Post-Intelligencer praised the presence of its leads, and the credits of its producers and director, but said that "as is so often the case with even the best-intended movies these days, all this talent somehow adds up to amazingly little. It's a lifeless little caper piece that never develops the magic and intellectual fascination it needs to bond with an audience." Peter Stack of the San Francisco Chronicle called it "a forced, implausible flick that loses its energy as it tries to gain momentum." Michael O'Sullivan of The Washington Post wrote:

Linda Fiorentino in a nurse's uniform.

That's the good news.

The sweet-tart sweetheart never looked so bad-girl good as she does in the institutional whites she wears in "Where the Money Is".

[...]

The bad news? The story, which rumbles along like an unattended wheelchair on a gently sloping sidewalk. It's not a question of where it's going or when it's going to get there, but whether it'll maybe, just maybe, jump the curb on the way down and do some real damage.

Desmond Ryan of The Philadelphia Inquirer gave the film two-and-a-half stars out of four. He praised Newman's performance, but wrote that "any actor sharing screen time with the consummate professionalism of Newman in this kind of movie is going to feel like a rank amateur. Where the Money Is leaves you in no doubt of where the talent is in what would otherwise be a throwaway picture." Richard T. Jameson of the Mr. Showbiz website wrote that "if Newman weren't playing the enigmatic Henry, there'd be little to separate Where the Money Is from a hundred low-key, indie-class endeavors destined for straight-to-video limbo. The settings are few and nondescript (albeit subtly stylized in matters of color, Oregon regional texture, and very persuasive institutional anonymity). Action is minimal, dominated by dialogue (or, during Henry's possum-playing phase, monologue). Although the sanitarium personnel, patients, and other peripheral folks have been intelligently cast and directed, the picture is essentially a three-character movie, and while Linda Fiorentino and Dermot Mulroney (as Carol's husband Wayne) have both done deft work now and again, each has also disappeared into the wallpaper of countless forgettable flicks." Lawrence Toppman of The Charlotte Observer said that "maybe this is a case of too many cooks spoiling a simple broth: The movie had four producers, five executive producers, three writers (credited ones, anyhow) and three editors. They should have remembered what good bank robbers know: Planning a clever job is crucial, but you're arrested if you don't execute it properly." A critic for the BBC's teletext service Ceefax wrote:

Even at seventy-five, Paul Newman is by far the most lively thing in the film. No other actor delivers a remotely convincing or likeable performance. There is almost no chemistry between any of the characters and the slight and predictable story is riddled with holes. That said, it's quite harmless. With a mostly elderly cast and Newman's typically watchable turn, you could happily take your gran to see this film.

Amy Taubin wrote a more negative review of the film, writing in the Village Voice that "Paul Newman idles gracefully through Where the Money Is, a caper film hardly worthy of his presence." Rene Rodriguez of The Miami Herald awarded the film only one star, and called it an "unrelentingly dull" film that "tests his legendary charisma in a way no actor could overcome." John Hartl of the website Film.com wrote that "even with Paul Newman playing a mischievous criminal, and Linda Fiorentino and Dermot Mulroney as the young couple who get involved in his latest robbery, the movie utterly lacks the spark that makes caper movies fun." Geoff Pevere of The Toronto Star panned the casting of Fiorentino as the leading lady in a role he said "feels like a role written for Sandra Bullock", adding:

While Newman remains one of the most effortessly watchable male movie stars ever to shift his hips in Panavision, you can't help but wish Where The Money Is had required a little more of him than the dusting off of some of his most time-tested crowd-pleasers: the indifferent shrug, the look of disbelieving perplexity, the boozy philosophizing, the butter-wouldn't-melt cool. There's even a scene that places Newman in conspicuous proximity of a pool table, fer cripe's sakes.

And yet. Let's say, just for argument's sake, the movie had granted Henry something like the tragic, last-chance desperation of Burt Lancaster in Atlantic City - another, considerably better, movie about an old criminal trying to make a final-inning comeback.

And if it had, you've got to wonder if it wouldn't linger somewhat longer in memory than it does.

As it is, just everything about Where The Money Is quickly fades but Newman's eyes: Still piercing, still blue and still capable of holding an entire movie in their orbit.

And that's what's so frustrating.

You can't help but wish they were at the centre of a bigger, better and altogether less comfortable movie.
