= The Battle (2026 play) =

2026 play by John Niven

- Written by: John Niven
- Based on: The history of Oasis and Blur
- Setting: London, 1995

Premiere
- Date: 11 February 2026
- Place: Birmingham Repertory Theatre

The Battle is a comedy play by John Niven based on the rivalry between English Britpop rock bands Oasis and Blur.

== Production history ==
The play, directed by Matthew Dunster, made its world premiere at the Birmingham Repertory Theatre from 11 February to 7 March 2026, before transferring to Manchester Opera House from 17 to 21 March 2026. It was originally announced to tour the UK however the tour was subsequently cancelled aside from the Birmingham and Manchester dates. Mathew Horne was announced to play Britpop music executive Andy Ross.

== Cast and characters ==
Character	Birmingham / Manchester
Character	2026
Andy Ross	Mathew Horne
Alex	Brandon Bendell
Jo	Iona Champain
Justine	Harriet Cains
Guigsy	Billy Dunmore
Bonehead	Tommy Garside
Alan White	George Greenland
Damon	Oscar Lloyd
Meg	Louisa Lytton
Alan McGee	James Oates
Noel	Paddy Stafford
Graham	Will Taylor
Liam	George Usher
