= Kill Your Friends (film) =

- Theatrical release poster
- Directed by: Owen Harris
- Screenplay by: John Niven
- Based on: Kill Your Friends by John Niven
- Produced by: Len Blavatnik; Gregor Cameron; Will Clarke
- Starring: Nicholas Hoult; James Corden; Georgia King; Craig Roberts; Jim Piddock; Joseph Mawle; Ed Skrein; Tom Riley; Ed Hogg; Rosanna Arquette; Moritz Bleibtreu
- Cinematography: Gustav Danielsson
- Edited by: Bill Smedley
- Music by: Junkie XL; Bastille
- Production companies: Altitude Film Entertainment; AI Film; Pinewood Pictures; Unigram
- Distributed by: StudioCanal
- Release dates: 5 August 2015 (Fantasy Filmfest); 6 November 2015
- Running time: 103 minutes
- Country: United Kingdom
- Language: English
- Box office: $506,721

Kill Your Friends is a 2015 British satirical black comedy crime-thriller film directed by Owen Harris and written by John Niven based on his 2008 novel of the same name. The film stars Nicholas Hoult, Craig Roberts, Tom Riley, and Georgia King. It was selected to be shown in the city to City section of the 2015 Toronto Film Festival. The film was released by StudioCanal on 6 November 2015.

== Cast ==
- Nicholas Hoult as Steven Stelfox
- James Corden as Roger Waters
- Georgia King as Rebecca
- Craig Roberts as Darren
- Jim Piddock as Derek Sommers
- Joseph Mawle as James Trellick
- Ed Skrein as Danny Rent
- Tom Riley as Tony Parker-Hall
- Ed Hogg as DC Woodham
- Rosanna Arquette as Barbara
- Moritz Bleibtreu as Rudi
- Damien Molony as Ross
- Dustin Demri-Burns as David Schneider
- Al Weaver as Bill
- Bronson Webb as Rob Hastings
- Ella Smith as Nikki
- David Avery as Fisher

== Production ==
On 12 February 2014, Nicholas Hoult joined the cast of the film to play lead role as (A&R) agent Steven Stelfox. On 3 March 2014, Jim Piddock joined the film's cast to play Derek Sommers, the managing director of the record label. The film was scored by Junkie XL.

=== Filming ===
Principal photography commenced in London on 10 March 2014 and wrapped five weeks later. The film was shot at Pinewood Studios, London and Greater London.

== Reception ==
The film received mixed to negative reviews from critics. On Rotten Tomatoes, the film has an approval rating of 23% based on reviews from 60 critics, with an average rating of 4.50/10. The website's critical consensus reads, "Kill Your Friends takes futile stabs at black comedy, all strangled by a glut of tonal jumbles, bad casting, and unremittingly unlikable characters." On Metacritic it has a score of 45% based on reviews from 19 critics "indicating mixed or average reviews".

Andy Webster of The New York Times called it "A richly satisfying poison-pen letter to the music industry." Stephen Dalton of The Hollywood Reporter wrote: "Kill Your Friends remixes a brutally funny novel into an entertaining if somewhat familiar big-screen tale of amoral, chemically-fuelled decadence."

Andrew Barker of Variety wrote: "The film has its razor-sharp grace notes and a seductive stylishness, neither of which can override its relentlessly adolescent worldview."
