= Robert Addie =

English actor (1960–2003)

- Addie in 2003
- Born: 10 February 1960; Stroud, Gloucestershire, England
- Died: 20 November 2003 (aged 43); Cheltenham, Gloucestershire, England
- Years active: 1978–2001
- Children: 3

Robert Alastair Addie (10 February 1960 – 20 November 2003) was an English film and theatre actor, who came to prominence playing the role of Sir Guy of Gisburne in the 1980s British television drama series Robin of Sherwood.

== Early life ==
Addie was born in Stroud, Gloucestershire, the son of a stable owner, and was educated at Marlborough College. After initially being employed as a trainee estate agent on a ranch in Argentina, he returned to England and joined the National Youth Theatre in London in 1976 at the age of 16. Subsequently, he trained in acting at the Royal Academy of Dramatic Art, which he left after a year after successfully auditioning for the role of Mordred in the 1981 film Excalibur.

== Career ==
Addie was a professional polo player; his skills as a horseman and also with sword and bow led to his frequently appearing in historical dramas set in the medieval era.

At the beginning of his career in the early 1980s he appeared on British television in a number of advertisements for products ranging from Polycell plastering repair wall filler to Mr Kipling cakes. In the early 1980s he also appeared in a variety of theatrical productions, including Journey's End in 1981 at the Churchill Theatre in Bromley, and Conduct Unbecoming in 1982 at the Yvonne Arnaud Theatre in Guildford.

His most prominent film role was Prince Mordred in John Boorman's Excalibur (1981). Other films included Another Country (1984), as Delahay.

On television, Addie starred as Stalky in a 1982 BBC television mini-series of Rudyard Kipling's Stalky & Co.. In 1987, he played Sir Charles Kirkgordon in the CBS mini-series I'll Take Manhattan and Lord Peter Gillingham in A Hazard of Hearts. His role as Sir Guy of Gisburne in the 1984–1986 English television series Robin of Sherwood brought his career national exposure.

In 1989, he abandoned acting and spent several years living in Spain and the United States. Returning to his career in 1995, he initially performed in touring fringe theatre original productions with the Chichester-based Exiled Theatre Company. In 1995 he appeared with the company in Shades in Time - Martyrs, involving a promenading performance within Gloucester Cathedral, and as the character of a mouse in the play Shades in Time - The Docks set at Gloucester Docks as a part of the 1995 Gloucester Festival. In late 1995, he performed with the company in Cheltenham in a theatrical monologue he wrote about a Mohammedan jihadist suicide bomber entitled Acts of Revenge, and in 1996 he appeared in the new plays by the company: Edmund, Son of Gloucester (a prequel to Shakespeare's King Lear) and Into the Mist – a play set in early medieval Scotland with Addie playing St Columba.

After this Addie resumed a film and television career, also acting in a number of television commercials in 1998 for designer kitchens, whisky, and habit-breaking products for cigarettes.

== Personal life ==
Addie was married and divorced three times. He had three children; Alex, Alastair, and Caitlin.

== Death ==
Addie died, aged 43, from the effects of lung cancer at Cheltenham General Hospital on 20 November 2003 just less than three weeks after being diagnosed with the disease. On the tenth anniversary of his death, fans planted a cherry tree bearing a commemorative plaque in his memory in the Jack Gardner Memorial Garden in Cirencester.

== Filmography ==
=== Film ===
Year	Title	Role	Notes
1978	Absolution	Cawley	
1981	Excalibur	Mordred	
1984	Another Country	Delahay	
1985	Dutch Girls	Cone	TV film
1987	A Hazard of Hearts	Lord Peter Gillingham	TV film
1995	A Knight in Camelot		Direct to Video
1999	Captain Jack	Helicopter Pilot	Direct-to-video
1999	Mary, Mother of Jesus	Pontius Pilate	TV film
2000	Lorna Doone	King James II & VII	TV film
2001	Intimacy	Bar Owner	

=== Television ===
Year	Title	Role	Notes
1979	Horse in the House	Johnson	Episode: "Strangles"
1981	Barriers	Spike	3 episodes
1981	Bognor	Willy Wimbledon	Recurring role
1981	Smuggler	Scott-Posonby	Miniseries
1981	ITV Playhouse	Chris	Episode: "Friends and Other Lovers"
1982	Stalky & Co.	Stalky	Miniseries
1983	Andy Robson	George Grieve	Episode: "A Two Horse Race"
1983	All for Love	Larry	Episode: "Fireworks for Elspeth"
1984	The First Olympics: Athens 1896	Grantly Goulding	Miniseries
1984	The Brief	Lt. Husk	Episode: "People"
1984-1986	Robin of Sherwood	Sir Guy of Gisbourne	Series regular
1986	Ladies in Charge	Hugo	Episode: "All That Glitters"
1986	The Return of Sherlock Holmes	Mr Murray	Episode: "The Empty House"
1987	I'll Take Manhattan	Sir Charles Kirkgordon	Miniseries
1987	Lost Belongings	Captain Teddy Riddell	Miniseries
1987	Pulaski	Townsend	Episode: "Tough Guys Don't Blink"
1988	The Bill	Julian Pembridge	Episode: "The Trap"
1988	Screenplay	Guy	Episode: "Starlings"
1989	The Endless Game	Second Blond Youth	Miniseries
1989	Red Dwarf	Gilbert	Episode: "Timeslides"
1989	Crossbow	Brother Arris	4 episodes
1997	The New Adventures of Robin Hood	Groliet	Episode: "The Devil's Bride"
1997	Noah's Ark	Sir Robert Clifton	Episode: "Family Matters"
1998	Merlin	Sir Gilbert	Miniseries
1998	In the Red	Mr Bradley	1 episode
1998	Bugs	Gen. Russell	2 episodes
1998	The Wonderful World of Disney	Sir Sagramour	Episode: "A Knight in Camelot"
2000	Monarch of the Glen	Andersson	1 episode

== Theatre ==
- Journey's End (1981)
- Conduct Unbecoming (1982)
- Shades in Time (1995)
- The Tell-Tale Heart (1995)
- Acts of Revenge (Co-written by Robert Addie) (1995)
- Edmund Son of Gloucester (1996)
- Into the Mist (1996)
