= E. Max Frye =

American screenwriter and film director (b. 1956)

- Born: Eric Max Frye; 1956 (age 69–70); Oregon, U.S.
- Education: Lewis & Clark College; NYU Tisch School of the Arts
- Occupations: Screenwriter, film director

Eric Max Frye (born 1956) is an American screenwriter, film director, and television producer. He was nominated for an Academy Award for Best Original Screenplay for his work on the film Foxcatcher (2015).

== Early life and education ==
Frye was born in Oregon and raised in Eugene. His parents were Helen (Jackson) Frye, a federal judge, and William Frye. He attended Lewis & Clark College in Portland for one year before moving to Europe. He lived in Paris and worked as a model in Austria.

After returning to the United States, Frye considered becoming a painter and moved to New York's East Village in 1981 before attending New York University Film School a few years later. Talking a mandatory writing class, he discovered an affinity for screenwriting. "I pursued it hard," he recalled, "and got lucky."

== Career ==
While still in film school, Frye wrote the early drafts of what would become the screenplay for Something Wild (1986). That same year, Frye appeared in the music video for Bizarre Love Triangle directed by Robert Longo in which Frye argues about reincarnation with actress Jodi Long.

Other early writing credits included the 1993 comedy film Amos & Andrew, which he also directed, and the third episode in the 2001 HBO miniseries Band of Brothers.

Frye was a co-screenwriter for Foxcatcher (2014), a film about John du Pont and his 1996 murder of World and Olympic champion wrestler, Dave Schultz. Director Bennett Miller came to Frye with the project, who was intrigued by the reverse direction of the story arc: instead of an athlete working his or her way to the top, this story began with an Olympic champion who finds himself back at the bottom.

Frye taught screenwriting for many years, emphasizing conflict as an essential ingredient. "You want to have mean people, bullies, cheaters, criminals as part of your story. They are much more interesting characters than people who follow the rules." Billy Wilder is an influence; his portrait hangs in Frye's kitchen.

== Filmography ==
=== Film ===
Writer

- Something Wild (1986)
- Amos & Andrew (1993) (Also director)
- Palmetto (1998)
- Where the Money Is (2000)
- Ten Minutes Older: The Cello (2002) (Segment "The Enlightenment")
- Foxcatcher (2014)

Script consultant

- Dogville (2003)

Uncredited writing contributions

- Kangaroo Jack (2003)
- Fracture (2007)

=== Television ===
Year	Title	Writer	Executive Producer	Notes
2001	Band of Brothers	Yes	No	Episode "Carentan"
2003	Second Nature	Yes	No	TV movie
2018	The Alienist	Yes	Yes	Wrote 3 episode

== Awards and nominations ==
Award	Year	Category	Title	Result	Ref.
Academy Award	2015	Best Original Screenplay	Foxcatcher	Nominated	
Christopher Award	2002	Television & Cable	Band of Brothers	Won	
Edgar Award	1987	Best Motion Picture Screenplay	Something Wild	Won	
Independent Spirit Award	2015	Special Distinction Award	Foxcatcher	Won	
Primetime Emmy Award	2002	Outstanding Writing for a Limited Series or Movie	Band of Brothers	Nominated	
Primetime Emmy Award	2018	Outstanding Limited Series	The Alienist	Nominated	
Writers Guild of America Award	2015	Best Original Screenplay	Foxcatcher	Nominated	
