= Kill Your Friends =

2008 novel by John Niven

- First edition (UK)
- Author: John Niven
- Genre: Satire, Crime Fiction
- Publisher: Heinemann
- Publication date: 7 Feb 2008
- Publication place: United Kingdom
- Media type: Print
- Pages: 336
- ISBN: 0-434-01799-X
- Followed by: The Amateurs

Kill Your Friends is the debut novel by the Scottish writer John Niven. It was published in 2008 by William Heinemann.

== Plot summary ==
The novel is set in 1997 at the height of the Britpop music scene. The protagonist, Steven Stelfox, is unhappy about his current position as an A&R agent in the record company he works for in London. Stelfox, uninterested in most music, is jealous of his coworkers' success in finding successful musical acts and attempts to climb the career ladder amidst competition.

== Critical response ==
The protagonist and plot have been compared to American Psycho and been described as "mad, gleeful nastiness". The work is considered satirical, and is described as an "all-out assault" by The Independent, and as having "the horrible, slightly metallic tang of total authenticity" by the Philadelphia Weekly.

== Film adaptation ==
The novel was feature film adapted in 2015, directed by Owen Harris, with a script written by John Niven, starring Nicholas Hoult, Craig Roberts, Tom Riley, and Georgia King, released to generally mixed to negative reviews.
