= John Niven =

Scottish novelist and screenwriter (born 1966)

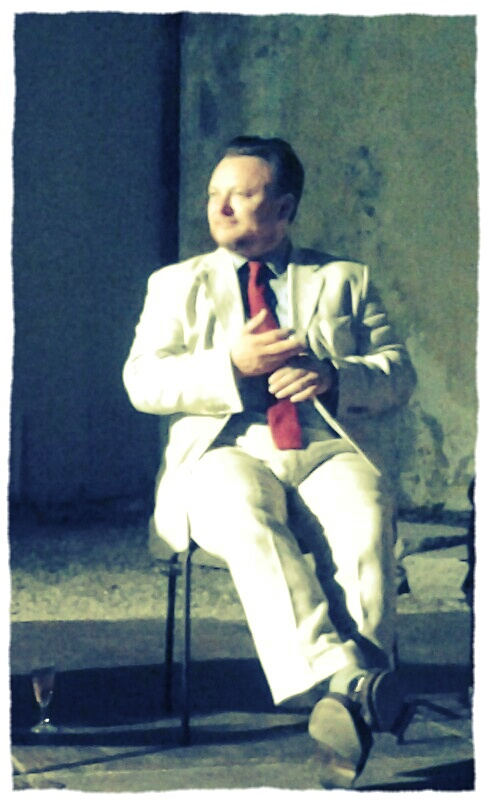
John Niven (2014)

John Niven (born 1 May 1966) is a Scottish autobiographer, novelist, playwright and screenwriter. His books include Kill Your Friends, The Amateurs, The Second Coming and O Brother.

== Career ==
Born in Irvine, Ayrshire, Niven read English literature at the University of Glasgow, graduating in 1991 with First Class honours. For the next ten years, he worked for a variety of record companies, including London Records and Independiente. He left the music industry to write full-time in 2002 and published Music from Big Pink, a book about The Band’s album of the same name, in 2005 (Continuum Press). The book was optioned for the screen by CC Films with a script written by English playwright Jez Butterworth.

Niven's breakthrough novel Kill Your Friends is a satire of the music business, based on his brief career in A&R, during which he passed up the chance to sign Coldplay and Muse. The novel was published by William Heinemann in 2008 to much acclaim, with The Word magazine describing it as "possibly the best British Novel since Trainspotting". It has been translated into seven languages and was a bestseller in Britain and Germany. Niven has since published The Amateurs (2009), The Second Coming (2011), Cold Hands (2012), Straight White Male (2013), The Sunshine Cruise Company (2015), No Good Deed (2017) and Kill 'em All (2018).

In 2023, Niven published O Brother, an autobiographical account of his childhood and adult life alongside his brother Gary, focusing on how they diverged as Niven became a successful writer while Gary’s career as a drug mule led to prison. Fiona Sturges in The Guardian wrote: "While Niven’s trademark black humour and blistering language remain intact, there is added vulnerability, emotional candour and bottomless love. His account of his brother’s death and the "Chernobyl of the soul" that followed made me sob more than once, and I suspect it will do the same to you."

Niven also writes screenplays with writing partner Nick Ball, the younger brother of British television presenter Zoë Ball. His journalistic contributions to newspapers and magazines include a monthly column for Q magazine, entitled London Kills Me. In 2009, Niven wrote a controversial article for The Independent newspaper where he attacked the media's largely complacent coverage of Michael Jackson's death.

In 2005, he co-wrote the lyrics of two songs on James Dean Bradfield's album The Great Western.

Niven co-wrote the screenplay How to Build a Girl, opposite Caitlin Moran, based upon her novel of the same name, directed by Coky Giedroyc.

Niven contributes regularly to Noble Rot Magazine, an independent publication about wine and food, and the Daily Record.

An atheist and a republican, Niven refuses to sing "God Save the Queen" on ideological grounds.

Niven's debut play, The Battle, a comedy about the rivalry between English rock bands Oasis and Blur, was to open at the Birmingham Repertory Theatre in February 2026 before touring the UK.

== Works ==
=== Books ===
- Music from Big Pink: A Novella (33 1/3) (2005)
- Kill Your Friends (2008)
- The Amateurs (2009)
- The Second Coming (2011)
- Cold Hands (2012)
- Straight White Male (2013)
- The Sunshine Cruise Company (2015)
- No Good Deed (2017, ISBN 978-0434023295)
- Kill 'Em All – sequel to Kill Your Friends (2018, ISBN 978-1785151576)
- The F*ck-it List (2020, ISBN 978-0434023264)
- O Brother (2023, autobiography)
- The Fathers (2025)

=== Filmography ===
- The Trip (2021) – writer
- How to Build a Girl – screenwriter
- Superviszed (2018) – screenwriter
- Kill Your Friends (2015) – screenwriter
- Cat Run (2011) – screenwriter

=== Play ===
- The Battle (2026)

== See also ==
- List of Scottish novelists
- List of Scottish playwrights
- List of University of Glasgow people
