= Rupert Everett =

English actor (born 1959)

- Everett in 2024
- Born: Rupert James Hector Everett; 29 May 1959 (age 67); Burnham Deepdale, Norfolk, England
- Education: Central School of Speech and Drama
- Occupation: Actor
- Years active: 1981–present
- Notable work: Another Country; My Best Friend's Wedding; An Ideal Husband
- Spouse: Henrique (m. 2024)

Rupert James Hector Everett (/ˈɛvərɪt/; born 29 May 1959) is an English actor. He first came to public attention in 1981 when he was cast in Julian Mitchell's play and subsequent film Another Country (1984) as a gay pupil at an English public school in the 1930s; the role earned him his first BAFTA Award nomination. He received a second BAFTA nomination and his first Golden Globe Award nomination for his role in My Best Friend's Wedding (1997), followed by a second Golden Globe nomination for An Ideal Husband (1999). He voiced Prince Charming in the animated films Shrek 2 (2004) and Shrek the Third (2007). He also played John Lamont/Mr. Barron in Miss Peregrine's Home for Peculiar Children (2016).

== Early life and education ==
Rupert James Hector Everett was born in Burnham Deepdale on 29 May 1959 to upper-class parents with aristocratic and military ties. His father, Major Anthony Michael Everett, was a stockbroker and an officer in the British Army. His maternal grandfather, Vice Admiral Sir Hector Charles Donald MacLean DSO, was a nephew of Hector Lachlan Stewart MacLean, a Scottish recipient of the Victoria Cross. His maternal grandmother, Opre Vyvyan, was a descendant of the Vyvyan baronets of Trelowarren and the German noble family von Schmiedern. He was raised a Roman Catholic.

Everett disclosed that between the ages of six and 14, he cross-dressed and wished to live as girl, before later identifying as a gay man. From the age of seven, he attended Farleigh School in Andover, Hampshire, and was later educated by Benedictine monks at Ampleforth College in North Yorkshire. At 16, his parents agreed to let him leave school and move to London to train as an actor at the Royal Central School of Speech and Drama. In a 1997 interview with Us magazine, he said that he supported himself during this period by engaging in sex work in exchange for drugs and money.

== Career ==
=== 1980s ===
Everett's break came in 1981 at the Greenwich Theatre and later West End production of Another Country, playing a gay schoolboy opposite Kenneth Branagh. In 1982, he had an early screen role in "The Manhood of Edward Robinson", a play in The Agatha Christie Hour series. He also acted at the Glasgow Citizens Theatre in the late 1970s and early 1980s.

His first film was the Academy Award-winning short A Shocking Accident (1982), directed by James Scott and based on a Graham Greene story. This was followed by a film version of Another Country in 1984 with Cary Elwes and Colin Firth. Following on with Dance With a Stranger (1985), Everett began to develop a promising film career until he co-starred with Bob Dylan in the unsuccessful Hearts of Fire (1987). Everett also sang two songs in Hearts of Fire, having released his first single "Generation of Loneliness" earlier that year in May 1987.

Despite being managed by Simon Napier-Bell (who had steered Wham! to prominence), the public didn't take to his change in direction. The shift was short-lived, and he only returned to pop indirectly by providing backing vocals for Madonna many years later, on her cover of "American Pie" and on the track "They Can't Take That Away from Me" on Robbie Williams' Swing When You're Winning in 2001.

=== 1990s ===
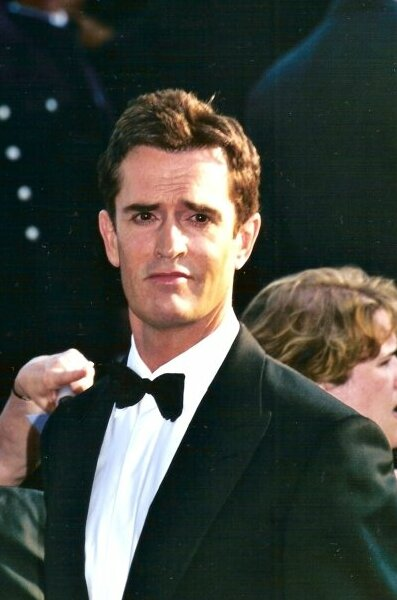
Everett at the 2004 Cannes Film Festival

In 1989, Everett moved to Paris, writing a novel, Hello, Darling, Are You Working?, and coming out as gay, a disclosure which he has said may well have damaged his career. Returning to the public eye in The Comfort of Strangers (1990), several films of variable success followed. The Italian comics character Dylan Dog, created by Tiziano Sclavi in 1986, is graphically inspired by him. Everett, in turn, appeared in Cemetery Man (1994), an adaptation of Sclavi's novel Dellamorte Dellamore. In 1995 Everett published a second novel, The Hairdressers of St. Tropez.

His career was revitalised by his award-winning performance in My Best Friend's Wedding (1997), playing Julia Roberts's character's gay friend, followed by a role as Madonna's character's gay best friend in The Next Best Thing (2000). (Everett was a backup vocalist on her cover of "American Pie", which is on the film's soundtrack.) Around the same time, he starred as the sadistic Sanford Scolex/Dr. Claw in Disney's Inspector Gadget (also 1999) with Matthew Broderick.

=== 2000s ===
For the 21st century, Everett decided to write again. He has been a Vanity Fair contributing editor, written for The Guardian, and he wrote a film screenplay on playwright Oscar Wilde's final years, for which he sought funding.

In 2006, Everett published a memoir, Red Carpets and Other Banana Skins, in which he reveals his six-year affair with British television presenter Paula Yates. Although he is sometimes described as bisexual, as opposed to gay, during a radio show with Jonathan Ross, he described his heterosexual affairs as the result of adventurousness: "I was basically adventurous, I think I wanted to try everything".

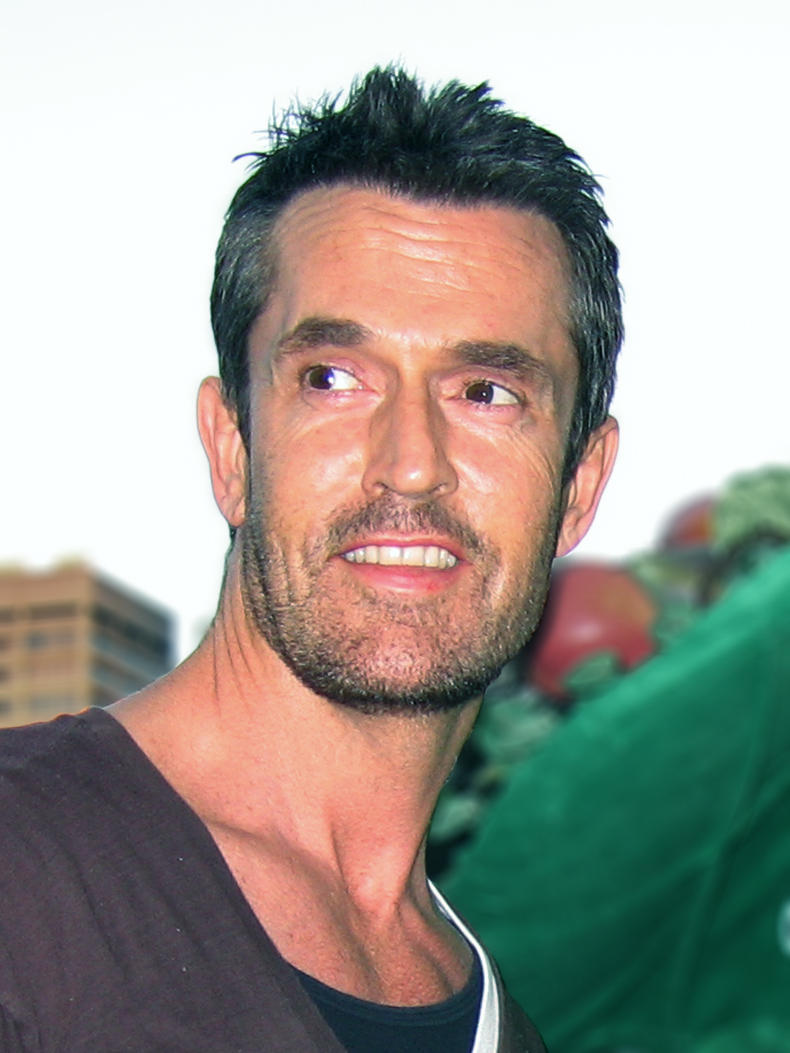
Everett at the 2007 Sydney Gay and Lesbian Mardi Gras

Since the revelation of his sexuality, Everett has participated in public activities (leading the 2007 Sydney Gay and Lesbian Mardi Gras), played a double role in the film St. Trinian's, and has appeared on TV several times (as a contestant in the special Comic Relief Does The Apprentice; as a presenter for Live Earth; and as a guest host on the Channel 4 show The Friday Night Project, among others). He has also garnered media attention for his vitriolic quips and forthright opinions during interviews that have caused public outrage.

In May 2007, he delivered one of the eulogies at the funeral of fashion director Isabella Blow, his friend since they were teenagers, who had died by suicide. He asked as part of his speech: "Have you gotten what you wanted, Issie? Life was a relationship that you rejected." During this time he also voiced the nefarious, but handsome, villain Prince Charming in the first two Shrek sequels.

Everett's documentary entitled The Victorian Sex Explorer on Sir Richard Francis Burton (1821–1890) in which he retraces the travels of Burton through countries such as India and Egypt, aired on the BBC in 2008. In 2009, Everett suggested, in an interview with the British newspaper The Observer, that coming out was not the best career move for a young actor.

Also in 2009, Everett presented two Channel 4 documentaries: one on the travels of Lord Byron, the Romantic poet, broadcast in July 2009, and another on British explorer Sir Richard Burton.

Everett then returned to his acting roots, appearing in several theatre productions: his Broadway debut in 2009 at the Shubert Theatre received positive critical reviews; he performed in a Noël Coward play Blithe Spirit, starring alongside Angela Lansbury, Christine Ebersole and Jayne Atkinson, under the direction of Michael Blakemore. and he was expected to tour several Italian cities during the 2008–09 winter season in another Coward play Private Lives (performed in Italian, which he speaks fluently)—playing Elyot to Italian actress Asia Argento's Amanda—but the production was cancelled.

=== 2010s ===
During the summer of 2010, Everett performed as Professor Henry Higgins, with English actress Honeysuckle Weeks and Stephanie Cole, in a revival of Pygmalion at the Chichester Festival Theatre. He reprised the role in May 2011 at the Garrick Theatre in London's West End, starring alongside Diana Rigg and Kara Tointon.

In July 2010, Everett was featured in the family history programme Who Do You Think You Are? Released in late 2010, the comedy film Wild Target features Everett as an art-loving gangster, and also starred Bill Nighy and Emily Blunt.

In 2012, Everett starred in the television adaptation of Parade's End with Benedict Cumberbatch. The five-part drama was adapted by Sir Tom Stoppard from the novels of Ford Madox Ford, and Everett appears as the brother of protagonist Christopher Tietjens.

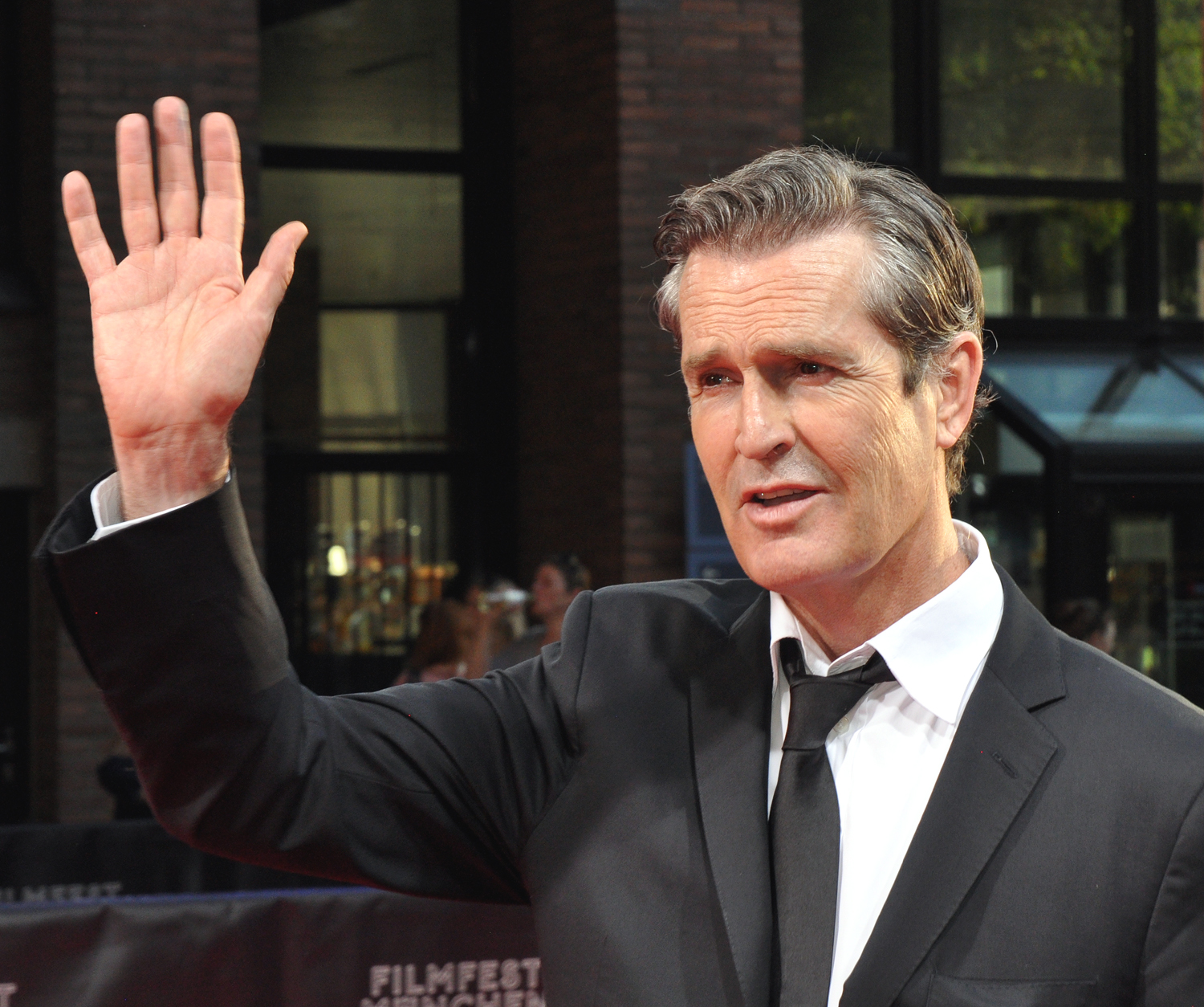
Everett at Munich Film Festival, 2015

Everett then starred as Oscar Wilde in The Judas Kiss, a stage play which was revived at London's Hampstead Theatre beginning 6 September 2012, co-starring Freddie Fox as Bosie, and directed by Neil Armfield. It ran at the Hampstead through 13 October 2012, toured the UK and Dublin, then transferred to the West End at the Duke of York's Theatre on 9 January 2013, in a limited run through 6 April 2013.

Everett won the WhatsOnStage Award for Best Actor in a Play, and was nominated for the Olivier Award for Best Actor. In 2016 the production, still starring Everett and with Charlie Rowe as Bosie, ran in North America for seven weeks in Toronto and five weeks at BAM in New York City.

In early 2013, Everett began working on a film portraying the final period of Wilde's life, stating in the media that he has had a fascination with the playwright since he was a child, as his mother read him Wilde's children's story The Happy Prince before he slept. The subsequent film The Happy Prince, written and directed by Everett, was released in 2018.

In 2015, it was announced that he would play the part of Philippe Achille, Marquis de Feron, the corrupt Governor of Paris, Head of the Red Guard and illegitimate brother to Louis XIII in the third series of the BBC One drama The Musketeers.

In 2017, Everett appeared as a recurring character in the BBC 2 comedy Quacks. He plays Dr Hendricks, the neurotic principal of the medical school.

== Personal life ==
Everett came out as gay in 1989. During the second half of the 1980s, he had a relationship with French actress Béatrice Dalle. He later called Dalle "perfect", commenting on their relationship: "I was gay but incompatibility is the agonising driving force behind many dangerous liaisons". He also said, "I knew I would never find another girl as good as Béa", although she eventually broke up with him. In the 1990s, he had a six-year affair with television presenter and writer Paula Yates, who was married to Bob Geldof at the time. When discussing their relationship, Everett dismissed suggestions that he was bisexual, describing his heterosexual experience as merely an "experiment". In 2007, he began a relationship with Henrique, a Brazilian accountant; they married in 2024.

During the late 1990s and 2000s, Everett owned properties and split his time between Los Angeles, New York City, Miami, and London before permanently relocating to the latter in 2010 following his father's death. In 2006, he joined a campaign against the establishment of a local Starbucks branch near his home in Bloomsbury, calling the global chain a "cancer". In 2008, he bought a home in another Central London district, Belgravia. By 2025, Everett was living near Enford, Wiltshire, to be closer to family. While there, he was involved in a campaign to prevent the closure of a local pub. Everett is a supporter of the Campaign for Real Ale.

=== Political views ===
Everett described having previously identified as a "champagne socialist". He recalled voting consistently for the Labour Party until the 2010 general election, when he voted for the Conservatives, although doing so made him feel "in all honesty that I'd committed a mortal sin." In 2025, he noted that his views had shifted rightward in response to immigration, taxation rises, and constitutional policies instituted by both Labour and Conservative governments since 1997. That year, he called for a return of "old school Conservativism" in British politics. Everett was also a patron of the British Monarchist Society and Foundation.

In a 2020 interview, Everett expressed his opposition to cancel culture. In 2025, he criticised what he termed "Cinematic Wokery" and the emergence of a more "puritanical" environment in "the world of entertainment": "we've got into a world where everybody's so easily offended by anything[...] that the result is that everything is completely predictable, and as a result really quite boring."

Everett has commented on various issues pertaining to sex and gender identity. In 2013, he worked on a documentary about sex work for Channel 4. That year, he signed an open letter from the English Collective of Prostitutes and Queer Strike to oppose the adoption of the "Swedish model", whereby the clients of sex workers (though not the workers themselves) are criminalised. In 2014, he wrote a long-form article on the issue for The Guardian and discussed it on the BBC One programme This Week.

In 2012, Everett expressed criticism of same-sex marriage. Explaining that he hated weddings and thought the institution of marriage was "so clearly a disaster", he deemed it "beyond tragic" that same-sex couples wanted access to it. Although arguing that same-sex couples should be allowed to raise children, he stated that he could not "think of anything worse than being brought up by two gay dads", because for him, "being gay was about wanting to do the opposite of the straight world". His comments brought public criticism. Drawing on his own experience as a child who wanted to be female for several years, Everett expressed opposition in 2016 to hormone replacement therapy for children and thought it "scary" that some parents offered their offspring the opportunity of gender transition.

== Filmography ==
=== Film ===
Year	Title	Role	Notes
1982	A Shocking Accident	Jerome and Mr. Weathersby	Short film
1983	Dead on Time	Bank Customer / Blind Man	
1984	Another Country	Guy Bennett	
1985	Dance with a Stranger	David Blakeley	
1986	Duet for One	Constantine Kassanis	
1987	The Gold Rimmed Glasses	Davide Lattes	a.k.a. Gli occhiali d'oro
1987	Hearts of Fire	James Colt	
1987	Chronicle of a Death Foretold	Bayardo San Román	
1987	The Right-Hand Man	Lord Harry Ironminster	
1990	The Comfort of Strangers	Colin	
1994	Prêt-à-Porter	Jack Lowenthal	
1994	The Madness of King George	George, Prince of Wales	
1994	Cemetery Man	Francesco Dellamorte	a.k.a. Dellamorte Dellamore
1996	Dunston Checks In	Lord Rutledge	
1997	My Best Friend's Wedding	George Downes	
1998	Shakespeare in Love	Christopher Marlowe	Uncredited
1998	B. Monkey	Paul Neville	
1999	An Ideal Husband	Lord Goring	
1999	Inspector Gadget	Sanford Scolex/Dr. Claw	
1999	A Midsummer Night's Dream	Oberon	
2000	Paragraph 175	Narrator	Documentary
2000	The Next Best Thing	Robert Whittaker	
2001	South Kensington	Nicholas "Nick" Brett	
2002	The Importance of Being Earnest	Algernon / "Bunbury"	
2002	The Wild Thornberrys Movie	Sloan Blackburn	Voice
2003	Unconditional Love	Dirk Simpson	
2003	To Kill a King	King Charles I	
2004	Stage Beauty	King Charles II	
2004	Shrek 2	Prince Charming	Voice
2004	A Different Loyalty	Leo Cauffield	Also executive producer
2004	People	Charles de Poulignac	
2005	Separate Lies	William "Bill" Bule	
2005	The Chronicles of Narnia: The Lion, the Witch and the Wardrobe	Mr. Fox	Voice
2006	As the Don Flows	Grigori Melekhov	
2007	Stardust	Prince Secundus	
2007	Shrek the Third	Prince Charming	Voice
2007	St. Trinian's	Camilla Fritton/Carnaby Fritton	Also executive producer
2009	St Trinian's 2: The Legend of Fritton's Gold	Camilla Fritton	Also executive producer
2010	Wild Target	Ferguson	
2011	Hysteria	Lord Edmund St. John-Smythe	
2013	Justin and the Knights of Valour	Sota	Voice
2015	A Royal Night Out	King George VI	
2016	Miss Peregrine's Home for Peculiar Children	John Lamont/Mr. Barron	Credited as Ornithologist
2018	The Happy Prince	Oscar Wilde	Also writer and director
2019	The Warrior Queen of Jhansi	Sir Hugh Rose	
2019	Muse	The Demon	
2021	She Will	Tirador	
2021	Warning	Charlie	
2022	My Policeman	Older Patrick Hazelwood	
2023	Napoleon	Arthur Wellesley, 1st Duke of Wellington	
2025	Juliet & Romeo	Lord Capulet	
2025	Judas' Gospel	Caiaphas	
2026	Madfabulous	Gelert	
2027	The Resurrection of the Christ: Part One	Abraham	Post-production
2028	The Resurrection of the Christ: Part Two	Abraham	Post-production
TBA	Ancestors	Maurice	Post-production
TBA	Lead Heads		Post-production

=== Television ===
Year	Title	Role	Notes
1982	Strangers	Lord Plural	Episode: "The Lost Chord"
1982	Play for Today	Boy at Party	Episode: "Soft Targets"
1982	The Agatha Christie Hour	Guy	Episode: "The Manhood of Edward Robinson"
1983	Princess Daisy	Ram Valenski	Miniseries
1984	The Far Pavilions	George Garforth	2 episodes
1985	Arthur the King	Lancelot	Television film
1993	Mama's Back	Stephen	Television film
2001	Victoria's Secret Fashion Show	Host	Television special
2003	Les Liaisons dangereuses	Vicomte Sébastien de Valmont	Miniseries
2003	Mr. Ambassador	Ambassador Ronnie Childers	Television film
2004	Sherlock Holmes and the Case of the Silk Stocking	Sherlock Holmes	Television film
2005	Boston Legal	Malcolm Holmes	2 episodes
2006	And Quiet Flows the Don	Grigory	Miniseries
2006	The Friday Night Project	Guest host	
2007	Comic Relief Does The Apprentice	Celebrity contestant	Walked out during first episode
2007–2018	The Graham Norton Show	Self - Guest	3 episodes
2008	The Victorian Sex Explorer	Presenter	Documentary special
2009	The Paul O'Grady Show	Guest	2 episodes
2010	Who Do You Think You Are?	Self	Episode: "Rupert Everett"
2011	Black Mirror	Judge Hope	Episode: "Fifteen Million Merits"
2012	Parade's End	Mark Tietjens	Miniseries
2012	The Other Wife	Martin Kendall	2 episodes
2013	Loose Women	Self	5 episodes
2016	The Musketeers	Marquis de Feron	6 episodes
2017	50 Shades of Gay	Himself	Television special
2017	Quacks	Doctor Hendricks	3 episodes
2019	The Name of the Rose	Bernardo Gui	8 episodes
2020	Adult Material	Carroll Quinn	4 episodes
2022–2024	The Serpent Queen	Charles V	4 episodes
2023	Funny Woman	Brian Debenham	6 episodes
2023	Everybody Loves Diamonds	John Lovegrove	6 episodes
2023	Gray	Kevin Tagg	8 episodes
2024	Emily in Paris	Giorgio Barbieri	Episode: "All Roads Lead to Rome"
2026–present	Rivals	Malise Gordon	Season 2

== Theatre ==
Year	Production	Role	Venue
2009	Blithe Spirit	Charles	Shubert Theatre, Broadway
2013	Judas Kiss	Oscar Wilde	Duke of York's Theatre, West End
2014	Amadeus	Salieri	Chichester Festival Theatre
2020	Who's Afraid of Virginia Woolf?	George	Booth Theatre, Broadway
2023	A Voyage Round My Father	Father	Theatre Royal Bath

== Awards and nominations ==
Year	Award	Category	Project	Result
1982	Laurence Olivier Awards	Actor of the Year in a New Play	Another Country	Nominated
1982	Laurence Olivier Awards	Best Newcomer in a Play	Another Country	Nominated
1985	British Academy Film Award	Most Outstanding Newcomer to Film	Another Country	Nominated
1994	National Board of Review	Best Acting Ensemble	Prêt-à-Porter	Won
1997	Golden Globe Award	Best Supporting Actor – Motion Picture	My Best Friend's Wedding	Nominated
1997	British Academy Film Awards	Best Supporting Actor	My Best Friend's Wedding	Nominated
1997	National Society of Film Critics	Best Supporting Actor	My Best Friend's Wedding	Nominated
1997	MTV Movie Award	Best Comedic Performance	My Best Friend's Wedding	Nominated
1997	MTV Movie Award	Best Breakthrough Performance	My Best Friend's Wedding	Nominated
1997	Online Film Critics Society Award	Best Supporting Actor	My Best Friend's Wedding	Nominated
1997	American Comedy Award	Funniest Supporting Actor – Motion Picture	My Best Friend's Wedding	Won
1997	Florida Film Critics Circle	Best Supporting Actor	My Best Friend's Wedding	Won
1997	Satellite Award	Best Supporting Actor – Motion Picture	My Best Friend's Wedding	Won
1999	Golden Globe Award	Best Actor – Musical or Comedy Film	An Ideal Husband	Nominated
1999	European Film Award	Best Actor	An Ideal Husband	Nominated
1999	Satellite Award	Best Actor – Comedy or Musical	An Ideal Husband	Nominated
2013	Laurence Olivier Awards	Best Actor	The Judas Kiss	Nominated
2018	Berlin International Film Festival	Golden Bear	The Happy Prince	Nominated
2018	British Independent Film Awards	Best Actor	The Happy Prince	Nominated
2018	European Film Awards	Best Actor	The Happy Prince	Nominated
2018	Magritte Award	Best Foreign Film	The Happy Prince	Nominated
2019	London Film Critics' Circle	Breakthrough British Filmmaker of the Year	The Happy Prince	Nominated
2019	London Film Critics' Circle	British Actor of the Year	The Happy Prince	Won
2019	London Film Critics' Circle	Actor of the Year	The Happy Prince	Nominated
2021	British Academy Television Awards	Best Supporting Actor	Adult Material	Nominated
2022	TIFF Tribute Awards	Performance (ensemble)	My Policeman	Won

== Bibliography ==
- 1992: Hello, Darling, Are You Working? (novel)
- 1995: The Hairdressers of St. Tropez (novel)
- 2006: Red Carpets and Other Banana Skins (memoir)
- 2012: Vanished Years (memoir)
- 2019: To the End of the World: Travels with Oscar Wilde (memoir)
- 2024: The American No (short stories)
