= Julian Mitchell =

English playwright, screenwriter and novelist

Charles Julian Humphrey Mitchell FRSL
- Born: 1 May 1935 (age 91); Epping, Essex, United Kingdom
- Education: Oxford University
- Occupations: Playwright; screenwriter; novelist
- Writing career
- Notable work: Another Country
- Notable awards: Laurence Oliver Awards; 1982 Another Country – Play of the Year; Somerset Maugham Award; 1964 The White Father

Charles Julian Humphrey Mitchell, FRSL (born 1 May 1935) is an English playwright, screenwriter and occasional novelist. He is best known as the writer of the play Another Country and its film adaptation, and as a screenwriter for TV, producing many original plays and series episodes, including ten episodes of Inspector Morse.

Mitchell was born in Epping, Essex, and was educated at Winchester College, where he won the English Verse and Duncan Reading Prizes. He did his national service in the Royal Navy Submarine Service from 1953–55 as a Sub Lt RNVR. He then went to Wadham College, Oxford and received a BA with first class honours in 1958. This was followed by a period as a Harkness Fellow in the USA (1959–61). He earned an M.A. in 1962 at St. Antony's College, Oxford. Since 1962 he has been a freelance writer.

In the late 1960s, Mitchell co-wrote the teleplay Arthur (Or the Decline and Fall of the British Empire) with Ray Davies of The Kinks. It was never produced, though it gave rise to the band's concept album. He recently recalled the aborted project: "Arthur had a most unhappy history. It was originally meant to be a ... sort of rock opera, and we got as far as casting (excellent director and actors) and finding locations and were about to go when the producer went to a production meeting without a proper budget, tried to flannel his way through it, was immediately sussed and the production pulled. I have never been able to forgive the man."

Mitchell has written nine produced plays, including Another Country, which won the SWET (now Olivier) Award for Play of the Year (1981), and After Aida (1985), a play-with-music about composer Giuseppe Verdi.

He was elected a Fellow of the Royal Society of Literature in 1985.

Mitchell has screenplay credits for five feature films. The earliest was Arabesque (1966), which was directed by Stanley Donen. Another Country (1984) is based on Mitchell's own play, and directed by Marek Kanievska. Vincent & Theo (1990) is a biographical film about the famed painter Vincent van Gogh and his brother Theo, and was directed by Robert Altman. August (1996) was directed by and starred Anthony Hopkins, and was adapted from Anton Chekhov's classic play Uncle Vanya. Wilde (1997) is based on the life of Oscar Wilde, and was directed by Brian Gilbert.

In 2007 he wrote the BBC4 drama Consenting Adults about Sir John Wolfenden and his celebrated 1957 report calling for the legalization of homosexuality.

== Novels ==
- Imaginary Toys (1961)
- A Disturbing Influence (1962)
- As Far as You Can Go (1963)
- The White Father (1964) (winner of the Somerset Maugham Award)
- A Circle of Friends (1966)
- The Undiscovered Country (1968)

== Selected Plays ==
- Another Country (1981)
- Francis (1984)
- After Aida (1985)
- Falling Over England (1994)
- August (1994) an adaptation of Anton Chekhov's Uncle Vanya (1897)
