= To the Power of Three =

Studio album by 3
- Released: 14 March 1988
- Recorded: E-Zee Studios (London, England); West Side Studios (London, England)
- Genres: Progressive rock; pop rock; new wave
- Length: 37:57 (Note: Geffen: 9 24181-2)
- Label: Geffen
- Producers: Carl Palmer; Robert Berry

Singles from To the Power of Three
- 1. "Talkin' Bout" Released: February 1988 (US)

Professional ratings
Review scores
Source	Rating
AllMusic	2/5 stars
The Philadelphia Inquirer	1/4 stars

To the Power of Three (stylised as ...To the Power of Three) is the only album by the British-American progressive rock band 3. Produced by Carl Palmer and Robert Berry, it was released in early 1988 by Geffen Records.

The album contains a version of the Byrds' classic song "Eight Miles High" with altered lyrics. The closing track, "On My Way Home", was dedicated to Tony Stratton Smith.

To the Power of Three was met with negative reviews and was a commercial failure, having reached just number 97 in the U.S. Billboard 200. Jason Ankeny wrote to AllMusic a one-sentence review in which he opined that "...To the Power of Three fails to recapture the magic of Keith Emerson and Carl Palmer's past collaborations" and gave the album a 2-out-of-5 star rating.

"Talkin' Bout", the only single released from the album, peaked at number 9 in the Mainstream Rock chart.

== Track listing ==
Side one
No.	Title	Writer(s)	Length
1.	"Talkin' Bout"	Robert Berry	4:00
2.	"Lover to Lover"	Keith Emerson, Berry, Carl Palmer	4:12
3.	"Chains"	Sue Shifrin, Bob Marlette	3:42
4.	"Desde la Vida": (I) "La Vista"; (II) "Frontera"; (III) "Sangre de Toro"	Emerson, Berry, Palmer; Emerson; Emerson, Palmer	7:06

Side two
No.	Title	Writer(s)	Length
5.	"Eight Miles High"	Gene Clark, Roger McGuinn, David Crosby^{[a]}	4:08
6.	"Runaway"	Berry	4:42
7.	"You Do or You Don't"	Berry	5:02
8.	"On My Way Home"	Emerson	4:46
Total length:			37:57

Notes

- ^a Lyrics were revised by Emerson, Berry, and Palmer.

== Personnel ==
3

- Keith Emerson – keyboards
- Robert Berry – vocals, guitars, bass; production
- Carl Palmer – drums; production

Additional musicians

- Suzie O'List – backing vocals
- Kim Liatt J. Edwards – backing vocals
- Lana Williams – backing vocals

Technical personnel

- David Thoener – mixing (The Record Plant, New York City) (on "Talkin' Bout", "Lover to Lover", and "You Do or You Don't")
- Steve McNeill – engineering (E-Zee Studios, London)
- Ian Remmer – engineering (E-Zee Studios, London)
- Peter Jones – engineering (West Side Studios, London)
- Nick Davis – engineering (West Side Studios, London)
- Greg Fulginiti – mastering (Artisan Sound Recorders)
- John Kalodner – John Kalodner
- The Cream Group, London – art direction
- Mike Smallcombe – photography

== Charts ==
Album

Chart (1988)	Peak position
US Billboard 200	97
