= Emerson, Lake & Powell (album) =

Studio album by Emerson, Lake & Powell
- Released: 2 June 1986
- Recorded: 1985–1986
- Studio: Maison Rouge, London; Fleetwood Mobile, Sussex
- Genre: Progressive rock; hard rock; new wave
- Length: 42:42
- Label: Polydor
- Producer: Tony Taverner; Greg Lake

Singles from Emerson, Lake & Powell
- 1. "Touch and Go" Released: 9 June 1986; 2. "Lay Down Your Guns" Released: 25 August 1986 (US)

Professional ratings
Review scores
Source	Rating
AllMusic	2.5/5 stars

Emerson, Lake & Powell is the only studio album by English progressive rock band Emerson, Lake & Powell, released on 2 June 1986 by Polydor Records.

The album's debut single was "Touch and Go" which peaked at number 60 on the Billboard charts on 19 July 1986. Cash Box called it a "thunderous, large scale rock drama." The main synthesizer part of "Touch and Go" is based on the English folk tune "Lovely Joan". Another version of "Touch and Go" was recorded by Emerson, Lake & Palmer and is included in the box set The Return of the Manticore (1993).

The opening track, "The Score", is best known to have been used as the arena, intermission and TV theme song of New Japan Pro-Wrestling from the 1990s to the early 2010s.

== Track listing ==
All lyrics are written by Greg Lake, except where noted; all music is composed by Keith Emerson, except where noted

Side one
No.	Title	Length
1.	"The Score"	9:10
2.	"Learning to Fly"	3:52
3.	"The Miracle"	7:02

Side two
No.	Title	Lyrics	Music	Length
4.	"Touch and Go"		Traditional English folk song Lovely Joan collected by Ralph Vaughan Williams (adaptation: Emerson)	3:35
5.	"Love Blind"			3:08
6.	"Step Aside"			3:42
7.	"Lay Down Your Guns"	Lake, Steve Gould		4:20
8.	"Mars, the Bringer of War"		Gustav Holst (adaptation: Emerson, Lake, Cozy Powell)	7:53
Total length:				42:42

CD bonus tracks on some (but not all) US and Japanese Versions
No.	Title	Writer(s)	Length
9.	"The Loco-Motion"	Gerry Goffin, Carole King	4:40
10.	"Vacant Possession"		4:42
Total length:			52:24

== Personnel ==
=== Emerson, Lake & Powell ===
- Keith Emerson – keyboards
- Greg Lake – vocals, guitars, bass, production
- Cozy Powell – drums, percussion

=== Technical personnel ===
- Tony Taverner – production, engineer, mixing engineer
- Greg Calbi – mastering engineer (at Sterling Sound, New York)
- Debra Bishop – design

== Charts ==
Chart (1986)	Peak position
Australian Albums (Kent Music Report)	87
Japanese Albums (Oricon)	19
UK Albums (OCC)	35
US Billboard 200	23

== Certifications ==
Region	Certification	Certified units/sales
Canada (Music Canada)	Gold	50,000^{^}
^{^} Shipments figures based on certification alone.
