= Inferno (soundtrack) =

Soundtrack to Dario Argento's film of the same title

Film score by Keith Emerson
- Released: 17 October 1980
- Recorded: 1980
- Genre: Progressive rock
- Length: 47:26
- Label: Cinevox
- Producer: Keith Emerson

Keith Emerson chronology
In Concert (Emerson, Lake & Palmer) (1979)	Inferno (1980)	Nighthawks (1981)

Professional ratings
Review scores
Source	Rating
Allmusic	2.5/5 stars

Inferno is the soundtrack to Dario Argento's film of the same title, first released as a 15-track LP in 1980 on Atlantic Records (K 50753), in 1981 by Cinevox, then as a CD in 2000, with a bonus track of outtakes reportedly utilized in the film itself, but not included on the original vinyl release. The score was composed and performed by keyboardist Keith Emerson, former member of the progressive rock band Emerson, Lake & Palmer.

As a selection from Giuseppe Verdi's Nabucco is played in several different sequences in the film, Argento tasked Emerson with including the piece in his soundtrack. Emerson re-orchestrated "Va, pensiero..." in five-four time to mimic a "fast and bumpy" taxi ride through Rome. When Argento reviewed Emerson's progress he did not initially recognize the remix, but was later pleased to discover it was used for Sara's taxi ride.

Emerson's music met with a mixed response from critics, some of whom compared it unfavorably with Goblin's score for Argento's Suspiria (1977). Time Out's Scott Meek noted that "Argento's own over-the-top score [for Suspiria] has been replaced by religioso thunderings from the keyboards of Keith Emerson." A review of the 2000 Cinevox CD from Allmusic notes, "The keyboard selections are rather unremarkable, except for the finale, "Cigarettes, Ice, Etc.," on which Emerson uses his full keyboard arsenal to excellent effect. Unfortunately, the choral segments sound rather pretentious and dated." In a review of the Anchor Bay DVD, Michael Mackenzie of DVD Times opined, "The music is more or less adequate and at times adds to the tension, but it frequently contradicts what is happening on-screen, and is certainly nothing when compared to Goblin's soundtrack for Suspiria." While Guido Henkel of the DVD Review website wrote that Emerson's score was "a beautiful and impressive piece", he felt that "[t]he music is poorly spotted and too often cues are placed where they shouldn't be, or placed so that they actually break tension rather than help building it."

== Track listing ==
1. "Inferno (Main Titles Theme)" – 2:56
2. "Rose's Descent into the Cellar" – 4:58
3. "Taxi Ride (Rome)" – 2:15
4. "The Library" – 0:57
5. "Sarah in the Library Vaults" – 1:17
6. "Bookbinder's Delight" – 1:11
7. "Rose Leaves the Apartment" – 3:30
8. "Rose Gets It" – 2:04
9. "Elisa's Story" – 1:10
10. "A Cat Attic Attack" – 3:13
11. "Kazanian's Tarantella" – 3:34
12. "Mark's Discovery" – 1:23
13. "Mater Tenebrarum" – 2:38
14. "Inferno Finale" – 2:26
15. "Cigarettes, Ices, Etc." – 2:50
16. "Inferno Outtakes Suite" – 10:17 (CD bonus track)

All songs composed and performed by Emerson, except for track 13: words by Emerson/Godfrey Salmon, arranged by Emerson/Salmon; orchestrated and conducted by Salmon.
