= Back from the Dead (Spinal Tap album) =

Studio album by Spinal Tap
- Released: June 16, 2009
- Genres: Comedy rock, heavy metal
- Length: 66:07
- Labels: Spuzzle, Polymer
- Producer: C.J. Vanston

Spinal Tap chronology
Break Like the Wind (1992)	Back from the Dead (2009)	The End Continues (2025)

Back from the Dead is an album by the comedy heavy metal band Spinal Tap. Released on June 16, 2009, it is the first release by the Spinal Tap name since 1992's Break Like the Wind, and was Spinal Tap's last album until 2025's The End Continues.

== Concept and music ==
The concept of Back from the Dead is that Spın̈al Tap has reunited in honor of the 25th anniversary of This Is Spinal Tap, and have launched an "unwigged and unplugged" tour.

Back from the Dead features re-recorded versions of songs featured in This Is Spın̈al Tap and its soundtrack album, and five songs not previously available on an album: "Warmer Than Hell", "Short and Sweet", "Celtic Blues", "Rock 'n' Roll Nightmare", and "Back from the Dead". "Jazz Oddyssey", which appeared briefly during the film, appears in three parts within Back from the Dead. "Sex Farm" appears in a funk-oriented version, while "(Listen to the) Flower People" appears in a reggae-oriented version.

Back from the Dead features guest appearances by Phil Collen, Keith Emerson, John Mayer and Steve Vai.

== Packaging and artwork ==
The CD/DVD version of the album features a card stock foldout from which a diorama of a "stage" can be assembled, with cut outs of all three band members depicted as action figures. A representation of the famed model of Stonehenge sits in the middle, flanked by images of the upraised hands of concertgoers. The band members demonstrated the packaging during an appearance on The Tonight Show with Conan O'Brien.

== Release and reception ==
Professional ratings
Review scores
Source	Rating
AllMusic	3/5 stars
NME	(Note: Displayed on the current site as; see the archive for the original 11/10.)
Planet Sound	7/10 stars

Back from the Dead was released on June 16, 2009. The album is packaged with a DVD featuring commentary on each of the album's tracks. Preceding the album's release, it was streamed for free by Entertainment Weekly and Spinner. An exclusive version of Back from the Dead was made available through Amazon MP3, featuring a newly recorded version of "(Listen to the) Flower People" in its original style. An additional track, "Saucy Jack", was released through the official Spın̈al Tap website. Fifteen of the songs have been released as downloadable content for the Rock Band video game series, along with "Short and Sweet" appearing as a packaged song in Lego Rock Band.

While AllMusic reviewer Stephen Thomas Erlewine felt that the straightforward approach of the re-recorded songs hurt the remakes, which "pale next to the originals", he wrote that the new songs are "top-notch, eclipsing the often forced Break Like the Wind, and striking the right balance between parody and real rock & roll. They're the reason to hear Back from the Dead, which otherwise is just a tad too satisfied with its own humor for its own good." Back from the Dead was nominated for Best Comedy Album for the 52nd Grammy Awards.

== Track listing ==
All tracks are written by Christopher Guest, Michael McKean, Harry Shearer and Rob Reiner, except where noted.

No.	Title	Writer(s)	Length
1.	"Tonight I'm Gonna Rock You Tonight" (original version on This Is Spinal Tap)		2:42
2.	"Back from the Dead" (originally released online in 2000)	Guest; McKean; Shearer; C. J. Vanston	4:06
3.	"(Funky) Sex Farm" (original version on This Is Spinal Tap)		4:30
4.	"Rock 'n' Roll Creation" (original version on This Is Spinal Tap)		5:05
5.	"Jazz Oddyssey I"	Guest; McKean; Shearer; Vanston; Greg Bissonette	2:19
6.	"Gimme Some Money" (original version on This Is Spinal Tap)		2:33
7.	"Rock 'n' Roll Nightmare" (original version from The T.V. Show)	Guest; McKean; Shearer	3:19
8.	"Heavy Duty" (original version on This Is Spinal Tap)		4:57
9.	"America" (original version on This Is Spinal Tap)		3:39
10.	"Jazz Oddyssey II"	Guest; McKean; Shearer; Vanston; Bissonette	2:00
11.	"(Listen to the) Flower People (Reggae Stylee)" (original version on This Is Spinal Tap)		3:20
12.	"Hell Hole" (original version on This Is Spinal Tap)		3:34
13.	"Big Bottom" (original version on This Is Spinal Tap)		3:39
14.	"Celtic Blues" (original version from The Return of Spinal Tap)	Guest; McKean; Shearer	1:25
15.	"Jazz Oddyssey III"	Guest; McKean; Shearer; Vanston; Bissonette	2:16
16.	"Warmer Than Hell" (originally released in 2007)	Guest; McKean; Shearer; Vanston	3:51
17.	"Stonehenge" (original version on This Is Spinal Tap)		4:30
18.	"Short and Sweet" (guitar solo by John Mayer, Phil Collen and Steve Vai)	Music: Guest; McKean; Shearer; – Lyrics: McKean; Annette O'Toole	6:35
19.	"Cups and Cakes" (original version on This Is Spinal Tap)		1:40
Total length:			66:00

Amazon MP3 exclusive (only available in US, UK and Germany)
No.	Title	Length
20.	"(Listen to the) Flower People (2009)"	2:48

iTunes exclusive
No.	Title	Length
20.	"Sex Farm (2009)"	3:13

SpinalTap.com exclusive
No.	Title	Writer(s)	Length
20.	"Saucy Jack"	Guest; McKean; Shearer	1:38

== Personnel ==
Note that for this release, the credits show the musicians under their real names, although the characters of David, Derek and Nigel are referenced elsewhere in the album package.

Spinal Tap

- Derek Smalls (Harry Shearer) – bass guitar, vocals
- David St. Hubbins (Michael McKean) – lead vocals, guitar
- Nigel Tufnel (Christopher Guest) – lead guitar, vocals
- Gregg Bissonette – drums
- C. J. Vanston – keyboards

Additional musicians

- Parker Posey – screams on "Back from the Dead"
- Keith Emerson – keyboards on "Heavy Duty"
- Chris Tedesco – trumpet on "(Funky) Sex Farm"
- Glen Berger – baritone sax on "(Funky) Sex Farm" and "(Listen To The) Flower People (Reggae Stylee)"
- Jo Pusateri – percussion on "(Funky) Sex Farm"
- Phil Collen – guitar solo on "Short and Sweet"
- John Mayer – guitar solo on "Short and Sweet"
- Steve Vai – guitar solo on "Short and Sweet"

== Charts ==
Chart performance for Back from the Dead
Chart (2009)	Peak position
Australian Albums (ARIA)	76
US Billboard 200	52
