= The Best (band) =

Short-lived English–American supergroup

- Origin: London, England
- Years active: 1990–1994
- Past members: Keith Emerson; John Entwistle; Joe Walsh; Jeff "Skunk" Baxter; Simon Phillips; Rick Livingstone; Zak Starkey

The Best were an English rock supergroup band formed in London in 1990.

== History ==
In 1990, Featuring Keith Emerson (of Emerson, Lake & Palmer and the Nice) on keyboards, John Entwistle (of the Who) on bass and vocals, Joe Walsh (Eagles, James Gang, and solo fame) on guitar and vocals, Jeff "Skunk" Baxter (Steely Dan, the Doobie Brothers) on guitar, and Simon Phillips (Pete Townshend, the Jack Bruce band, 801, the Jeff Beck Group; later of Toto) on drums. Relative unknown Rick Livingstone sang lead vocals (along with Walsh and Entwistle), and also played flute and timpani. Backing vocals were provided by Hamish, Angus and Fergus Richardson of the band Brother.

In a 1994 interview posted on the Who mailing list, Entwistle said that the Best had toured Japan, and that an American tour had been planned but never came to fruition. In the same interview he also noted that drummer Zak Starkey had also been "in the band a while".

In 2010, a DVD of the band's 26 September 1990 performance in Yokohama, Japan was released.
