= Stuart Smith (musician) =

British musician (born 1956)

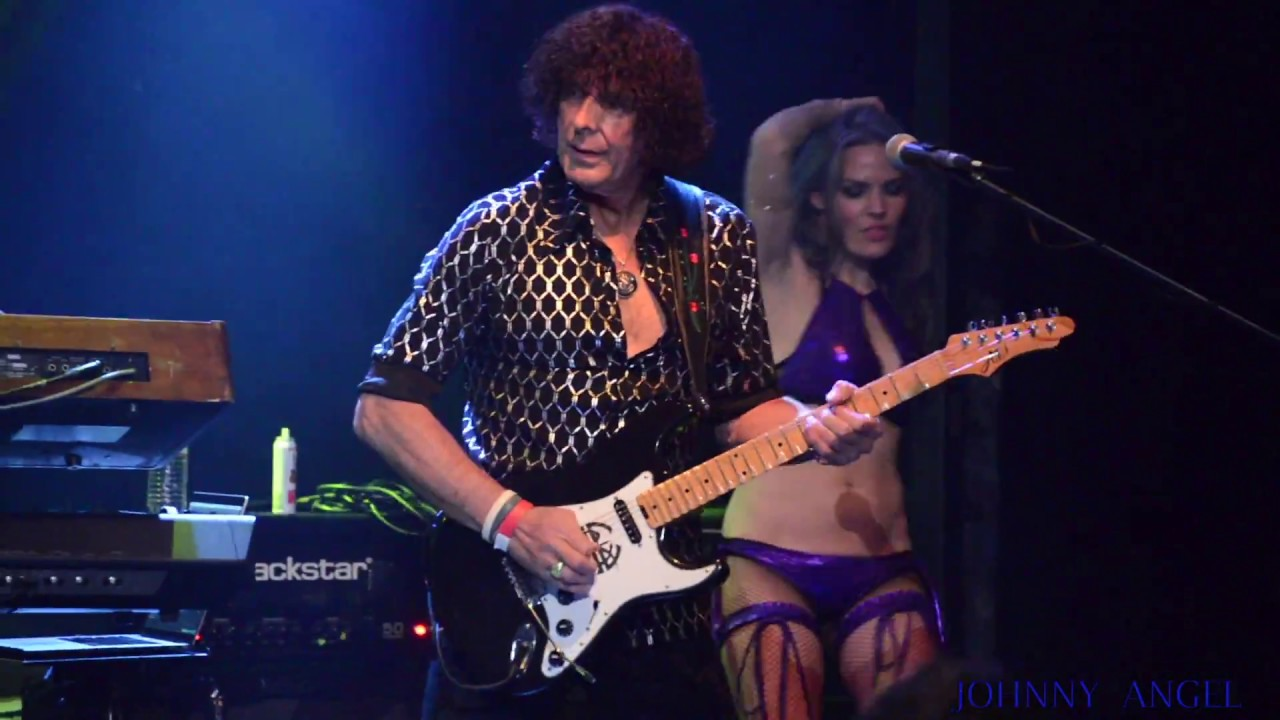
- Smith in 2018.

Background information
- Born: 30 May 1956 (age 70)
- Origin: York, England
- Genres: Rock
- Occupation: Musician
- Instrument: Guitar
- Years active: 1970s–present
- Labels: Quarto Valley Records, Frontiers Records
- Website: www.heavenandearthband.com

Stuart Barry Smith (born 30 May 1956) is a British rock-blues guitarist and songwriter, who is best known for playing guitar in Sweet and Heaven & Earth.

== Early life ==
Smith was born in York, England, the son of an RAF jet fighter pilot. At age seven and a half he was given a Spanish guitar by some RAF friends of his parents who were being transferred overseas. At his father's insistence he started classical guitar lessons and soon overtook his tutor. He studied classical guitar style until the age of 14 which is when he was introduced to rock & roll after seeing a Deep Purple concert. Although he excelled at playing guitar, he always considered it a hobby as his ambition was to follow in his father's footsteps and become a jet fighter pilot. These hopes were dashed at 17 years old after discovering he was red/green color blind. After a brief stint working at Texas Instruments in Bedford, England he once again picked up the guitar and turned professional. Smith later on met and became good friends with Deep Purple's Ritchie Blackmore at a party after a Deep Purple concert, who mentored him and helped him refine his playing skills.

== Career ==
=== 1970s ===
During the 1970s, after playing in numerous local rock bands, Smith formed his own group Sidewinder at the age of 17. They toured extensively throughout England and Europe and after the band dissolved towards the end of the 1970s he relocated to London and played with various other groups.

=== 1980s ===
In 1983 after becoming disillusioned with the British rock music scene and at the suggestion of Ritchie Blackmore, Smith packed up his guitars and moved to Long Island, New York where he formed a band called Mirage. To help Smith get the band notoriety Ritchie Blackmore would frequently sit in with the band. Mirage played around New York and Long Island until 1986 when he moved to Los Angeles.

=== 1990s ===
In 1994 Smith, along with longtime drummer Richie Onori, formed the Aliens of Extraordinary Ability with Keith Emerson. Other members of this band were bassist Marvin Sperlng and vocalist Robbie Wykoff (later of with Roger Waters). The Aliens of Extraordinary Ability were offered a record deal by Korean electronics giant Samsung but could not take them up on the offer as Emerson was contracted to tour with ELP. Smith was offered the deal from Samsung for a solo record. Having no permanent band at the time Smith recruited the help of Richie Sambora, Joe Lynn Turner, Glenn Hughes, Camine Appice, Howard Leese, and Kelly Hansen along with many others to record the critically acclaimed Stuart Smith's Heaven & Earth. This CD was produced by Pat Regan and Howard Leese and was released by Frontiers Records in Europe and Pony Canyon in Japan after Samsung's record division closed due to the Asian economy collapse in 1998. During this period Smith and Joe Lynn Turner were approached by Taylor Guitars to contribute a track for their Sounds of Wood & Steel album. The acoustic instrumental track "Alma de Alma" written by Smith & Turner continues to be played on radio stations to this day.

=== 2000s ===
Following this release of Heaven & Earth, Smith recorded and released a second Heaven & Earth album entitled Windows to the World which featured Kelly Keeling on vocals. Other musicians on this album were Chuck Wright, Marvin Sperling, Tony Franklin on bass, Richie Onori on drums and Arlan Schierbaum on keyboards. Windows to the World was also produced by Howard Leese and was released in 2001 on Frontiers Records in Europe and JVC in Japan. In 2004 Smith along with drummer Richie Onori opened up their own label, Black Star Records and re-released the first Heaven & Earth album along with an EP entitled "A Taste of Heaven" The EP featured four new songs with vocalist Paul Shortino and four songs from the first album. This line up turned out to be short lived and Heaven & Earth continued on with singer Kelly Hansen and started to achieve moderate success till Hansen joined Foreigner in 2005.

In 2008, after failing to find a suitable replacement for Hansen, Smith received a phone call from former bandmate Steve Priest asking if he wanted to try putting Sweet back together again. They recruited vocalist Joe Retta, former Crows keyboard player Stevie Stewart and drummer Richie Onori and on 5 June 2008 appeared on the Mark & Brian Radio Show playing a few of the Sweet classic hits to great response. The next day they followed up with their first show at a small club called "Nicholby's" in Ventura and played their first official show at The Whiskey on Sunset Blvd. on 12 June. This incarnation of Sweet took off and the band toured extensively headlining and co-headlining festivals throughout the remainder of the year. A performance at the Morongo Casino in Cabazon, California on 30 August was recorded by the Westwood One Mobile for radio broadcast purposes. Towards the end of the year the band released the performance as a live CD entitled, Sweet. Live in America. The album was later released by the Varese Saraband label including a bonus track cover version of The Beatles; "I Saw Her Standing There".

=== 2010–present ===
In late 2011, Smith teamed up with executive producer Bruce Quarto to produce a new Heaven & Earth album. The album entitled "Dig" was completed in January, 2013 and features Smith on guitars, Joe Retta on vocals, Richie Onori on drums, Chuck Wright on bass and Arlan Schierbaum on keyboards with guest appearances by Howard Leese, David Paich (Toto) and Richie Sambora (Bon Jovi). The album, produced by Dave Jenkins, was released on 23 April 2013 to rave reviews. Smith quit Sweet on 12 August 2012 to concentrate on the new Heaven & Earth album. On 13 March 2013, Heaven and Earth released a video for the first single from "Dig", entitled, "No Money, No Love". The video was "directed by Glen Wexler, who designed the Dig album cover and was produced by Jeremy Alter and Meiert Avis who produced videos for Evanescence and Paramore". In 2014 Chuck Wright was replaced by Bad Company bassist Lynn Sorensen, Arlan Schierbaum was replaced on keyboards by Ty Bailie and Richie Onori was replaced on drums by Jackie James Barnes, son of the Australian singer Jimmy Barnes, and Heaven & Earth embarked on a European tour which saw the band performing a set at The Montreux Jazz Festival and ending up at the Steel House Festival in Wales. On their return to Los Angeles, Jackie James Barnes was replaced by drummer Kenny Aronoff and the band set about recording a new album which was released to much critical acclaim in 2017 and was entitled Hard to Kill.

== Equipment ==
In the past for his electric work Smith uses 1970s Fender Stratocasters with a slightly scalloped neck. For acoustic he uses Taylor (Leo Kotke 12 string) and Babicz. Guitar strings are a personalized set of Dean Markley "Blue Steel" strings, gauges 009, 013, 017, 030, 040, 050. Picks are tortoise shell made by Pick Boy. Cables are made by Monster Cable. Locking tuners by Sperzel. Amplifiers are made by Marshall and Kasha. String saddles by Graph Tech. Nuts by Earvana. Pick ups by Seymour Duncan. Strobo tuners by Peterson. Various pedals by Dunlop. Echo units by TC Electronic and Chandler. Wah Wah pedals by Morley. Pick up booster by Seymour Duncan. Octave divider by Boss. Marshall 4 x 12 cabinets. Strap locks by Dunlop. Power conditioners by Gemini, Visual Sound and Furman. Currently he is using an Aero3 "Stuart Smith" Signature Model guitar and Engl Amplifiers.

== Awards and achievements ==
In 2004, Smith won the award for "Best Guitarist" at the Los Angeles All Access Music Awards Show with "Heaven & Earth" winning "Best Overall Album of the Year" and repeated the feat in 2005 and again in 2006. He holds a black belt in the Shotokan style of karate and is currently working towards his second degree in Mixed Martial Arts with trainer Josh Brenner. He is also a "Specialist Reserve Officer" for the Los Angeles Police Department working with the I.C.A.C. (Internet Crimes Against Children), Task Force. He has played in the LAPD Celebrity Golf Tournament and has put on concerts to raise money for the LAPD Memorial Foundation. His hobbies include skiing, martial arts, reading, swimming, hiking, driving fast cars, internet word games and parachute jumping. He also appears in the motion picture "The Four Christmases" with Reese Witherspoon and Vince Vaughn as a guitarist in Dwight Yoakam's band. During his career, Smith has recorded or shared the stage with Keith Emerson, Richie Sambora, Joe Lynn Turner, Ritchie Blackmore, Slash, Buddy Guy, Steve Lukather, Glenn Hughes, Paul Rodgers, Howard Leese, Carmine Appice, Ian Paice and David Paich.

== Personal life ==
Stuart Smith has been married once in 1994 to Colleen Locklear, sister of Heather Locklear. The marriage lasted four years and the pair parted amicably. He has one daughter Sophia Stormy who lives in Chile with her mother whom Smith is on good terms with. Sophia Stormy was born on 28 April 2009 and is attending high school in Santiago Chile. Smith is currently listed as single.
