= The End Continues (album) =

Soundtrack album by Spinal Tap
- Released: September 11, 2025
- Genre: Comedy rock
- Label: Interscope
- Producer: C. J. Vanston; Spinal Tap

Spinal Tap chronology
Back from the Dead (2009)	The End Continues (2025)

Singles from The End Continues
- 1. "Stonehenge" Released: July 31, 2025

The End Continues is the fourth studio album by the comedy rock band Spinal Tap, released on September 11, 2025, through Interscope Records. It serves as the soundtrack album to the 2025 film Spinal Tap II: The End Continues, and is the band's first studio album since 2009's Back from the Dead.

The album consists of nine new tracks alongside four re-recordings of "classic" Spinal Tap songs. Paul McCartney, Elton John, Garth Brooks, and Trisha Yearwood collaborated on the album.

== Release and promotion ==
A re-recorded "Stonehenge" featuring Elton John was released on July 31, 2025, as the album's first single. The original recording of "Stonehenge" is included on This Is Spinal Tap, soundtrack to the film of the same name. Its release coincides with Spinal Tap II: The End Continues, a sequel to the 1984 mockumentary This Is Spinal Tap.

A limited edition LP version of The End Continues was issued in November 2025 for Record Store Day with three additional tracks. A sticker on the LP noted it was recorded in Dobly [sic], and that it was pressed on 181-gram vinyl (i.e., "one more" than the standard 180-gram audiophile release.) Packaged as a limited numbered edition, every copy of the LP is numbered 00011.

== Track listing ==
The End Continues track listing
No.	Title	Writer(s)	Length
1.	"Nigel's Poem"	Christopher Guest	1:10
2.	"Let's Just Rock Again"	C. J. Vanston	3:56
3.	"(Listen to the) Flower People" (with Elton John)	Guest; Michael McKean; Harry Shearer; Rob Reiner	2:34
4.	"Brighton Rock"	McKean	3:03
5.	"The Devil's Just Not Getting Old"	Shearer	3:23
6.	"Cups and Cakes" (with Paul McCartney)	Guest; McKean; Shearer; Reiner	1:35
7.	"I Kissed a Girl"	Shearer	3:10
8.	"Angels"	Guest	2:32
9.	"Big Bottom" (with Garth Brooks and Trisha Yearwood)	Guest; McKean; Shearer; Reiner	3:35
10.	"Judge and Jury"	McKean	3:10
11.	"Rockin' in the Urn"	Shearer	3:22
12.	"Blood to Let"	McKean	3:06
13.	"Stonehenge" (featuring Elton John)	Guest; McKean; Shearer; Reiner	4:34
Total length:			39:01

Additional tracks on 2025 Limited Edition LP

No.	Title	Length
14.	"My Life"
15.	"Ridealong"
16.	"Sister Spider"

== Personnel ==
Credits adapted from Tidal.

Note that on the actual album packaging, the members of Spinal Tap are credited under their real names in the songwriting credits, but under the names of their Spinal Tap personas for their musical performances.

=== Spinal Tap ===
- Michael McKean (as David St. Hubbins) – guitar (tracks 2–7, 9–12), vocals (2–4, 9, 11), hand claps (2), background vocals (3, 11); bass, keyboards (9)
- Christopher Guest (as Nigel Tufnel) – vocals (1–3, 7–11), string arrangement (1, 8–12), guitar (2–12), hand claps (2), background vocals (11), mandolin (12)
- Harry Shearer (as Derek Smalls) – bass (2–8, 10–12), vocals (2, 3, 5, 7, 10), hand claps (2), background vocals (3, 10, 11)

=== Additional contributors ===
- "Caucasian" Jeffery Vanston – production, mixing (all tracks); organ (1, 3–12); keyboards, piano (1, 3–11); string arrangement (1, 3, 6, 8–12), hand claps (2), horn (4), background vocals (5, 7, 10, 11), glockenspiel (6), guitar (10), cowbell (11); Mellotron, pipe (12)
- Steve Genewick – mixing (all tracks), hand claps (2), percussion (8)
- Gavin Lurssen – mastering
- Ed Cherney – engineering
- Nick Hodges – additional engineering
- Ethan Stevens – mastering assistance
- Christopher Anderson-Bazzoli – string arrangement (1, 3, 6, 8–12)
- Valerie Franco (credited as "Didi Crockett") – drums (2, 4–11)
- Mark Damian – percussion (2)
- Greta Pasqua – background vocals (3, 8), tambourine (6)
- Elton John – vocals (3, 12)
- Russell Kunkel – background vocals, drums (3)
- Chris Tedesco – trumpet (6)
- Paul McCartney – vocals (6)
- Keith England – background vocals (7)
- Phil X – guitar (7)
- Gregg Bissonette – drums (12)

== Charts ==
Chart performance for The End Continues
Chart (2025)	Peak position
Scottish Albums (OCC)	47
UK Albums Sales (OCC)	25
UK Soundtrack Albums (OCC)	1
US Top Album Sales (Billboard)	22
US Top Soundtracks (Billboard)	12
