= Folkal Point =

English folk rock band

- Origin: Bristol, England
- Genres: English folk; folk rock
- Years active: 1970s (Note: Formed in 1971.); 2019 (reunion)
- Labels: Midas Recordings (initially); Hoxa Recordings (subsequently)
- Past members: Cherie Musialik (lead vocals); Stuart Amesbury (guitar, vocals); Mark Steed (lead guitar, backing vocals); Paul Cook (guitar, backing vocals); Brian Murray (bass, MR.003 recordings only)
- Website: The official website of Folkal Point; Official YouTube channel

Folkal Point are a folk and folk rock band from Bristol, England which was active throughout the early 1970s. The band was formed in 1971 and released its eponymous debut studio album one year later in 1972 through the now defunct British label Midas Recordings.

The band's name is a play on words. The actual focal point of the band was the lead singer, namely Cherie Musialik, according to an interview with her and fellow band member Stuart Amesbury on YouTube dating to early 2022. The sound of the band is described as 'psych-folk' on the band's official website, although this term would not have existed when the band first formed. The band also exhibits influences of folk baroque.

== Biography ==
=== 1970s ===
The band was formed in Bristol and was active throughout the early 1970s, being rooted in the genres of folk and folk rock, with a focus on English folk music. The band was a quartet composed of the following members (all schoolkids at the time): Cherie Musialik (lead vocals), Stuart Amesbury (guitar and vocals), Mark Steed (lead guitar, banjo and backing vocals), and Paul Cook (guitar and backing vocals).

The eponymous debut studio album was released in 1972 through Midas Recordings, it included covers of compositions from; Bob Dylan, Joan Baez, Joni Mitchell, and Tom Paxton. Stylistically, it's a mixture of traditional English folk music and contemporary North American acoustic music. While the studio album was not a commercial success, having sold only 250 copies (a further 250 were lost to water damage following a fire at the record company), the record is now noted as a highly collectable example of the genre to this day. The sound engineer overseeing the recording sessions was label owner, Alan Green. Despite the limited number of units originally pressed in 1972, over the passing of time, the album became one of the most sought after British folk albums. Throughout the early 1970s, the band had performed regularly for BBC Radio Bristol.

Amongst traditional songs which the band performed on the Folkal Point LP is the ballad Lovely Joan and the better known ballad Scarborough Fair. In 2018, the Folkal Point album was re-mastered by Hoxa Sound.

=== 2000s ===
Stuart Amesbury and Cherie Musialik have worked with renowned British folk guitarists Bert Jansch and John Renbourn (both formerly of Pentangle) during the early 2000s, in the context of acoustic music promotions at the Alma Tavern Theatre in Clifton, Bristol. And, as Touch PA Systems / CRH Music continue to provide sound for many musical legends touring on the Americana circuit.

=== 2010s ===
The band reunited in June 2019 for the Clifton International Festival of Music which is held annually at various venues around the Clifton suburb of Bristol, playing to an enthusiastic capacity audience under the marquee at the Lansdown Hotel.

=== Trivia ===
Stuart Amesbury and Cherie Musialik have worked in a technical capacity with ex-Led Zeppelin member and multi-instrumentalist John Paul Jones during his involvement with North American all female, old time string band, Uncle Earl, particularly in support of their album, Waterloo, Tennessee. Mark Steed had been the manager of Button Guitars music shop and luthiery in Weston-super-Mare, North Somerset, just outside of Bristol. There is an interesting BBC Radio Bristol interview between presenter, Keith Warmington and Mark Steed that can be found on the band's official website.

The band's music can be found on the usual digital platforms and with various online merchants. The 1972 album, has been re-mastered and re-issued numerous times in many forms, including vinyl.

== Discography ==
- Folkal Point (1972), the band's only studio album released through Midas Recordings (re-mastered in 2018 through Hoxa Recordings and re-issued in 2019 with a bonus track through the same label)
- Sweet Sir Galahad (track) Folk Heritage compilation LP released by Windmill Records (WMD 179) in 1973.
- Folkal Point (album) Folkal Point LP released through Merry Go Round / Beatball (MGRL-1001) in 2019.
- Folkal Point (album) Folkal Point CD released through Big Pink Music (Big Pink 121) in 2011.
- Folkal Point (album) Folkal Point CD released through Zeitgeist (ZGCD 9102) in 2015.
- Folkal Point (album) Folkal Point CD with bonus track, released through Hoxa (MR003HC) in 2019.
- Scarborough Fair (track) Dust On The Nettles compilation CD released by Grapefruit / Cherry Red Records (CRSEGBOX030) in 2015.
- Lovely Joan (track) Sumer Is Icumen In compilation CD released by Grapefruit / Cherry Red Records (CRSEGBOX083) in 2020.
- Sweet Sir Galahad (track) Before The Day Is Done compilation CD released by Grapefruit / Cherry Red Records (CRSEGBOX114) in 2022.

== See also ==
- Pentangle
- Jacqui McShee
- John Renbourn
- Bert Jansch
