= Emerson, Lake & Powell =

English progressive rock band (1985–1986)

- Emerson, Lake & Powell, 1986. L-R: Keith Emerson, Greg Lake, and Cozy Powell.

Background information
- Origin: London, England
- Genre: Progressive rock
- Years active: 1985–1986
- Labels: Polydor, Manticore
- Spinoffs: 3
- Spinoff of: Emerson, Lake & Palmer, Whitesnake
- Past members: Keith Emerson; Greg Lake; Cozy Powell

Emerson, Lake & Powell, sometimes abbreviated as ELP, were an English progressive rock band, considered by many as a variant lineup of Emerson, Lake & Palmer, that released one official studio album in 1986. The album's debut single was "Touch and Go", which peaked at number 60 on the Billboard charts on 19 July 1986.

Keith Emerson and Greg Lake had planned to re-form the original ELP in 1984, but drummer Carl Palmer was unavailable because of contractual obligations to Asia. After auditioning a series of drummers unwilling to commit to the band, they approached Cozy Powell who had recently left Whitesnake and who had been a long time friend of Emerson's to replace him. The band have always insisted that it was a coincidence that his surname also happened to start with a P, thus allowing the band to retain its original initials, although they also joked about looking for a "Gene Prupa" and having approached "Phil Pollins" and "Ringo Parr" before Powell agreed to join. Shortly into recording, Emerson's barn studio was destroyed by a runaway tractor, requiring some parts of the album to be rerecorded, leading him to joke, "Perhaps we should have called it 'Emerson, Lake & Plough!'"

The band's self-titled studio album was a return to the familiar ELP style, with long progressive rock tracks, mellow ballads and a classical theme ("Mars, the Bringer of War" by Gustav Holst, a piece previously performed by Lake during his tenure in King Crimson). One song, "The Score", even references the lyric "Welcome back, my friends, to the show that never ends" from ELP's "Karn Evil 9: First Impression" (on the album Brain Salad Surgery). Initially, when the record company suggested that the group perform "Mars," Emerson refused, saying it would be like ELP Plays the Classics or Richard Clayderman Plays 'Clair de Lune'. After Powell showed him a video of one of his former bands playing the number, however, Emerson agreed to try it.

In live performance, the band also performed classic ELP and Nice material, such as "Tarkus", "Pirates", "Lucky Man", and "Rondo".

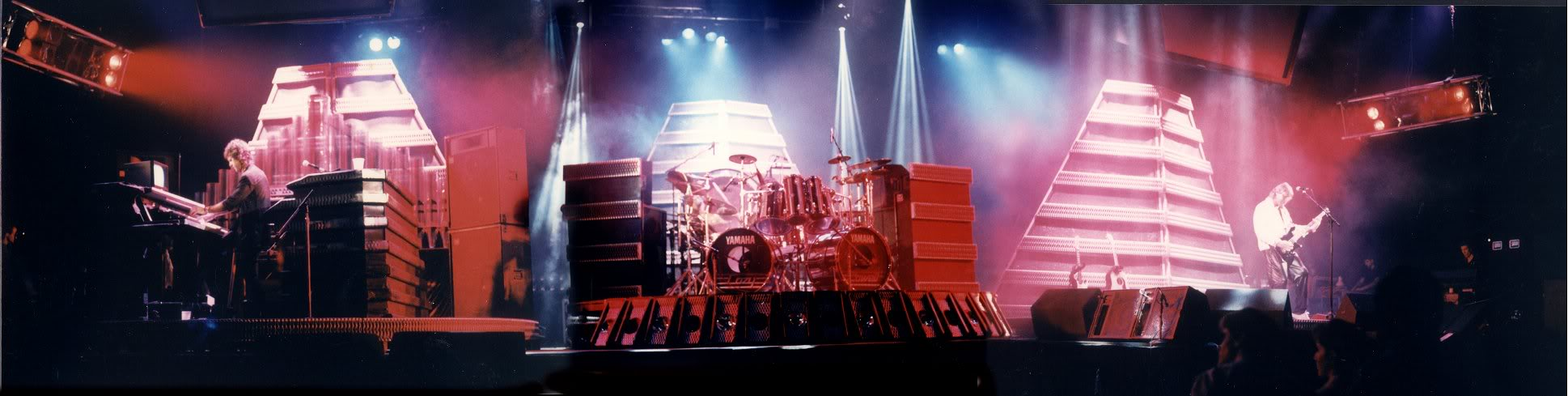
Emerson, Lake & Powell performing live on stage in Charlotte, North Carolina, on 12 October 1986.

The band's live tour was marred by a dispute which led to the band firing its management, and "ELPowell" disbanded without recording a second album. Emerson reunited with Palmer and together with Robert Berry, formed the band 3 for one album in 1988, before the original ELP lineup reformed in 1992 for the album Black Moon, which bears some stylistic similarities to the Emerson, Lake & Powell album.

Some Emerson, Lake & Powell live studio rehearsals and live recordings found their way onto bootlegs in the 1990s. The material was subsequently remastered and given an official release on two 2003 CDs, initially only available via the ELP website on Manticore Records.

All three members of the group have since died. Cozy Powell died in a car crash at age 50 on 5 April 1998. Keith Emerson died at age 71 on 11 March 2016, from a gunshot to the head ruled as suicide, and Greg Lake died of pancreatic cancer at age 69 on 7 December 2016.

== Band members ==
- Keith Emerson – keyboards, synthesizers (1985–1986; died 2016)
- Greg Lake – vocals, guitars, bass, co-production (1985–1986; died 2016)
- Cozy Powell – drums, percussion (1985–1986; died 1998)

== Discography ==
Studio albums

- Emerson, Lake & Powell (1986)

Live and compilation albums

- Live in Concert (2003)
- The Sprocket Sessions (2003; live rehearsals)
- Live in Concert & More (2012, 2CD combining Live in Concert and The Sprocket Sessions)
- The Complete Collection (2024, 3CD combining Emerson, Lake & Powell, Live in Concert, and The Sprocket Sessions)

Singles

- "Touch and Go/Learning to Fly" (1986)
- "Lay Down Your Guns/Step Aside" (1986)
