= 3 (1980s band) =

Progressive rock band (1988–1989)

- 3 in 1988, from left to right, Keith Emerson, Carl Palmer and Robert Berry

Background information
- Also known as: Emerson, Berry & Palmer
- Origin: London, England
- Genres: Progressive rock
- Years active: 1988–1989
- Label: Geffen
- Spinoff of: Emerson, Lake & Palmer, Emerson, Lake & Powell
- Past members: Robert Berry; Keith Emerson; Carl Palmer

The group 3 (sometimes referred to as Emerson, Berry & Palmer) were a short-lived progressive rock band formed by former Emerson, Lake & Palmer members Keith Emerson and Carl Palmer and American multi-instrumentalist Robert Berry in 1988.

After one album, To the Power of Three, 3 split up. Emerson & Palmer reunited with Greg Lake for 1992's Black Moon and Berry would form Alliance.

They performed live, as "Emerson and Palmer" (Berry was onstage but unnamed), at the Atlantic Records 40th Anniversary concert in 1988, broadcast on HBO, but only performed a long medley instrumental set including Fanfare for the Common Man, Leonard Bernstein's America, and Dave Brubeck's Blue Rondo, which later became an ELP encore in their 1990s concerts. They did not perform any original ELP material without Lake, nor did they perform any 3 songs since the band's label was Geffen Records.

3 performed at live venues to support their album, sometime in 1988. The three studio musicians were sometimes augmented by Paul Keller on guitar, Debra Parks and Jennifer Steele on backing vocals. Their setlist mainly consisted of material from their album, including "Runaway" and an extended jam version of the cover song "Eight Miles High". The group did a different arrangement of "Desde La Vida". The band did long instrumental jams based on music ELP covered including "Hoedown" & "Fanfare for the Common Man," but did not do any original ELP compositions. A long, elaborate cover of The Four Tops' "Standing in the Shadows of Love" was also included in the set.

Two live albums were released many years later, both on Rock Beat Records: Live Boston 88 (2015) and Live - Rockin' The Ritz (2017).

In October 2015, Emerson and Berry signed a contract with Frontiers Music to record a follow-up album at last, to be called 3.2. Emerson's death in March of the following year put a halt to that project. However, in July 2018, Berry released (as 3.2) The Rules Have Changed, built from musical ideas contributed by Emerson, but produced and performed entirely by Berry. A second 3.2 album, Third Impression, was released in 2021.

== Band members ==
- Keith Emerson – keyboards (1988–1989)
- Robert Berry – lead vocals, guitars, bass (1988–1989)
- Carl Palmer – drums, percussion (1988–1989)

=== Live members ===
- Paul Keller – guitars (1988–1989)
- Debra Parks – backing vocals (1988–1989)
- Jennifer Steele – backing vocals (1988–1989)

== Discography ==
=== Studio albums ===
Year	Album details
1988	To the Power of Three: Release date: 14 March 1988; Label: Geffen Records

=== as 3.2 ===
Year	Album details
2018	The Rules Have Changed: Release date: 10 August 2018; Label: Frontiers Music
2021	Third Impression: Release date: 12 February 2021; Label: Frontiers Music

=== Singles ===
Year	Single details
1988	"Talkin' Bout": Release date: February 1988; Label: Geffen Records

== See also ==
- Emerson, Lake & Palmer
- Emerson, Lake & Powell
