= Lovely Joan =

Traditional song

Lovely Joan is a traditional English folk song/ballad (Roud #592), and the tune to which it is sung. Collected by Ralph Vaughan Williams in 1908 from Christopher Jay of Norfolk, its melody was included in Vaughan Williams's Fantasia on Greensleeves, used in the opera Sir John in Love.

== Lyrics ==
The words to "Lovely Joan", as printed in The Penguin Book of English Folk Songs, are as follows:

A fine young man it was indeed,
He was mounted on his milk-white steed;
He rode, he rode himself all alone,
Until he came to lovely Joan.

"Good morning to you, pretty maid."
And, "Twice good morning, sir", she said.
He gave her a wink, she rolled her eye.
Says he to himself, "I'll be there by and by."

"Oh don't you think those pooks of hay
A pretty place for us to play?
So come with me like a sweet young thing
And I'll give you my golden ring."

Then he pulled off his ring of gold.
"My pretty little miss, do this behold.
I'd freely give it for your maidenhead."
And her cheeks they blushed like the roses red.

"Give me that ring into my hand
And I will neither stay nor stand,
For this would do more good to me
Than twenty maidenheads," said she.

And as he made for the pooks of hay
She leaped on his horse and tore away.
He called, he called, but it was all in vain
Young Joan she never looked back again.

She didn't think herself quite safe,
No, not till she came to her true love's gate.
She's robbed him of his horse and ring,
And left him to rage in the meadows green.

Sung by C. Jay, Acle, Norfolk (R.V.W. 1908).

== Other uses ==
English folk singer Martin Carthy recorded a version of "Lovely Joan" on his self-titled first album.

The melody for Lovely Joan was used by Emerson, Lake & Powell on the track Touch and Go of their eponymous album Emerson Lake & Powell in 1986 (uncredited). This traditional English folk song/ballad was integrally covered by Bristol-based teenage folk quartet Folkal Point and released on their self-titled studio album in 1972 through Midas Recordings. Lovely Joan was performed by Miranda Sex Garden on their 1992 release Iris, marking their transition from a madrigal group to an ethereal wave sound.

The melody was used for a set of variations commissioned for the 2017 Presteigne Festival from a number of composers, who each wrote one variation. The composers were Thomas Hyde, David Matthews, Adrian Williams, Michael Berkeley, Christopher Gunning, Huw Watkins, Sally Beamish, and Matthew Taylor.
