= Keith Emerson =

English keyboardist, songwriter, and composer (1944–2016)

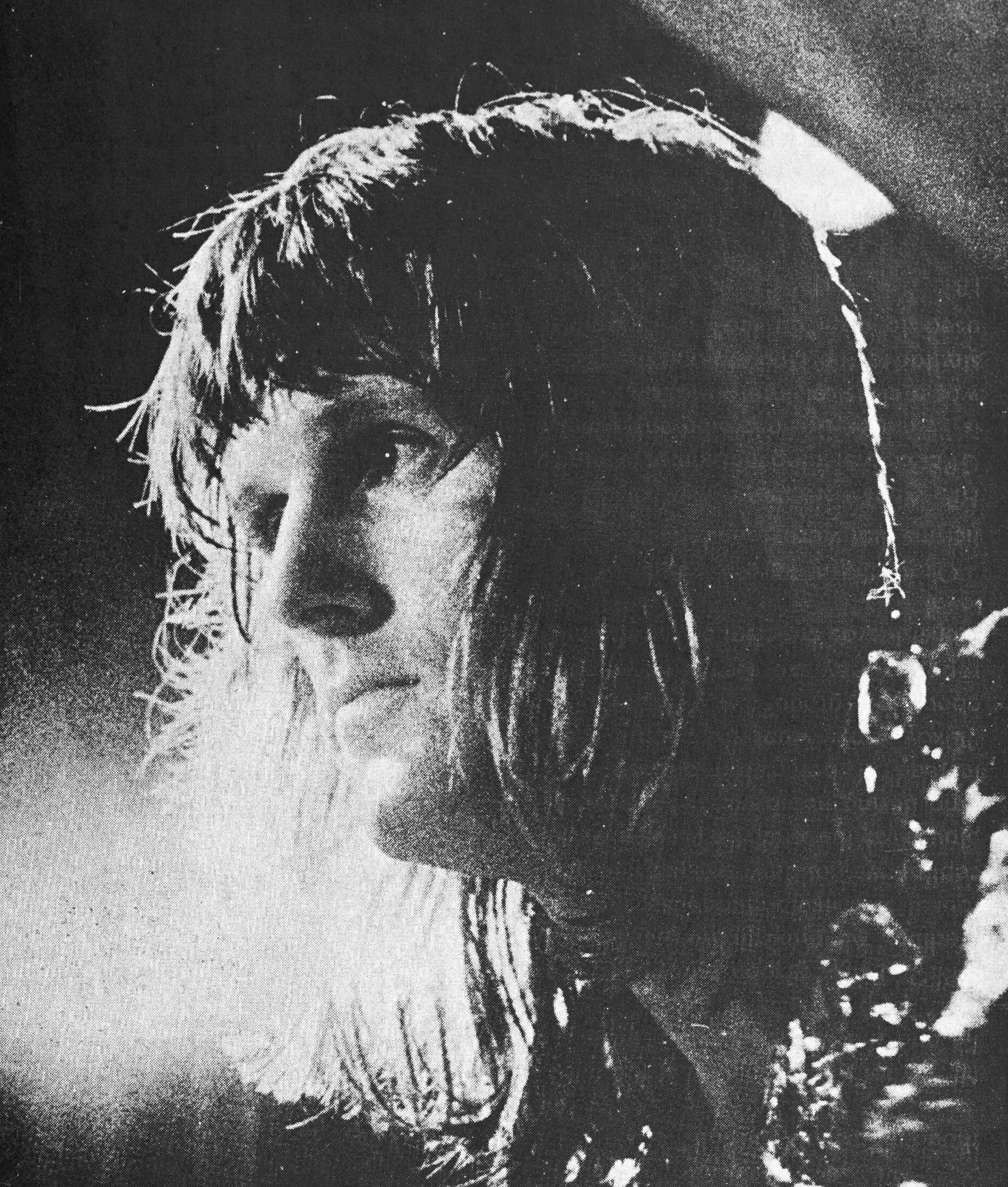
- Emerson performing with Emerson, Lake & Palmer in 1971.
- Born: Keith Noel Emerson; 2 November 1944; Todmorden, West Riding of Yorkshire, England
- Died: 11 March 2016 (aged 71); Santa Monica, California, U.S.
- Resting place: Lancing and Sompting Cemetery, Lancing, West Sussex, England
- Occupations: Musician; songwriter; composer
- Years active: 1964–2016
- Children: 2
- Musical career
- Genres: Progressive rock; classical
- Instrument: Keyboards
- Labels: Edel; Victor; Shout! Factory; Varèse Sarabande; Rhino; Manticore; J!MCO Records; Sanctuary; EMI; Marquee Inc.; Charly; Gunslinger Records; Cinevox

Keith Noel Emerson (2 November 1944 – 11 March 2016) was an English keyboardist, songwriter, composer and record producer. He played keyboards in a number of bands before finding his first commercial success with the Nice in the late 1960s. He became internationally famous for his work with the Nice, which included writing rock arrangements of classical music. After leaving the Nice in 1970, he was a founding member of Emerson, Lake & Palmer (ELP), one of the early progressive rock supergroups.

Emerson, Lake & Palmer were commercially successful through much of the 1970s, becoming one of the best-known progressive rock groups of the era. Emerson wrote and arranged much of ELP's music on albums such as Tarkus (1971) and Brain Salad Surgery (1973), combining his own original compositions with classical or traditional pieces adapted into a rock format. Following ELP's break-up at the end of the 1970s, Emerson pursued a solo career, composed several film soundtracks, and formed the bands Emerson, Lake & Powell and 3 to carry on in the style of ELP. In the early 1990s, ELP reunited for two more albums and several tours before breaking up again in the late 1990s. Emerson also reunited The Nice in 2002 and 2003 for a tour.

During the 2000s, Emerson resumed his solo career, including touring with his own Keith Emerson Band featuring guitarist Dave Kilminster, then replaced by Marc Bonilla, and collaborating with several orchestras. He reunited with ELP bandmate Greg Lake in 2010 for a duo tour, culminating in a one-off ELP reunion show in London to celebrate the band's 40th anniversary. Emerson's last album, The Three Fates Project, with Marc Bonilla and Terje Mikkelsen, was released in 2012. Emerson reportedly suffered from depression, and since 1993 developed nerve damage that hampered his playing, making him anxious about upcoming performances. He died of a self-inflicted gunshot wound on 11 March 2016 at his home in Santa Monica, California.

Emerson is widely regarded as one of the greatest keyboard players of the progressive rock era. AllMusic describes Emerson as "perhaps the greatest, most technically accomplished keyboardist in rock history". In 2019, readers of Prog voted him the greatest keyboard player in progressive rock.

== Early life ==
Emerson was born on 2 November 1944 in Todmorden, West Riding of Yorkshire. The family had been evacuated from southern England during World War II, after which they returned south and settled in Goring-by-Sea, West Sussex. Emerson attended West Tarring School (now Thomas A'Becket Middle School) in Tarring. His mother Dorothy was not musical, but his father Noel was an amateur pianist and taught Emerson basic piano. When Emerson was eight, his parents arranged formal tuition, learning to play and read music with "local little old ladies" until he was around thirteen, with whom he studied to ABRSM Grade 7. Emerson's teacher put him in competitions at the Worthing Music Festival and suggested he finish studying music in London, but Emerson had little interest in classical music at the time and chose jazz piano. His studies in Western classical music largely inspired his own style in his professional career which often incorporated jazz and rock elements.

Although Emerson did not own a record player, he enjoyed listening to music on the radio, particularly Floyd Cramer's 1961 slip note-style "On the Rebound" and the work of Dudley Moore. He used jazz sheet music from Dave Brubeck and George Shearing and learned about jazz piano from books and Andre Previn's version of My Fair Lady. He also listened to boogie-woogie, and to country-style pianists including Joe "Mr Piano" Henderson, Russ Conway and Winifred Atwell. Emerson later described himself: "I was a very serious child. I used to walk around with Beethoven sonatas under my arm. However, I was very good at avoiding being beaten up by the bullies. That was because I could also play Jerry Lee Lewis and Little Richard songs. So, they thought I was kind of cool and left me alone."

Emerson became interested in the Hammond organ after hearing jazz organist Jack McDuff perform "Rock Candy", and the Hammond became his instrument of choice in the late 1960s. Emerson acquired his first Hammond organ, an L-100 model, at the age of 15 or 16, on hire purchase and a loan from his father. He had saved money to buy a Bird electric organ with built-in speakers on each side, but then spotted a Hammond in the shop and thought it was a better purchase. Emerson's initial plan was for a non-musical career while playing the piano on the side. Upon leaving school he worked at Lloyds Bank Registrars where he played the piano in the bar at lunch times and local pubs at nights. He was ultimately fired from the bank. Emerson played in a local 20-piece swing band run by Worthing Council, performing Count Basie and Duke Ellington tunes. This led to the formation of the Keith Emerson Trio, with the group's drummer and bassist.

== Career ==
=== 1965–1970: Early groups and The Nice ===
While performing in the Worthing and Brighton area, Emerson played in John Brown's Bodies where members of The T-Bones, the backing band of blues singer Gary Farr, offered him a place in their group. After a subsequent UK and European tour with the T-Bones, the band split. Emerson then joined The V.I.P.'s, which he described as a "purist blues band"; his noted flamboyance began when a fight broke out during a performance in France. Instructed by the band to keep playing, he produced some explosion and machine gun sounds with the Hammond organ, which stopped the fight. His band members told him to repeat the stunt at the next concert, where Emerson played the organ back to front.

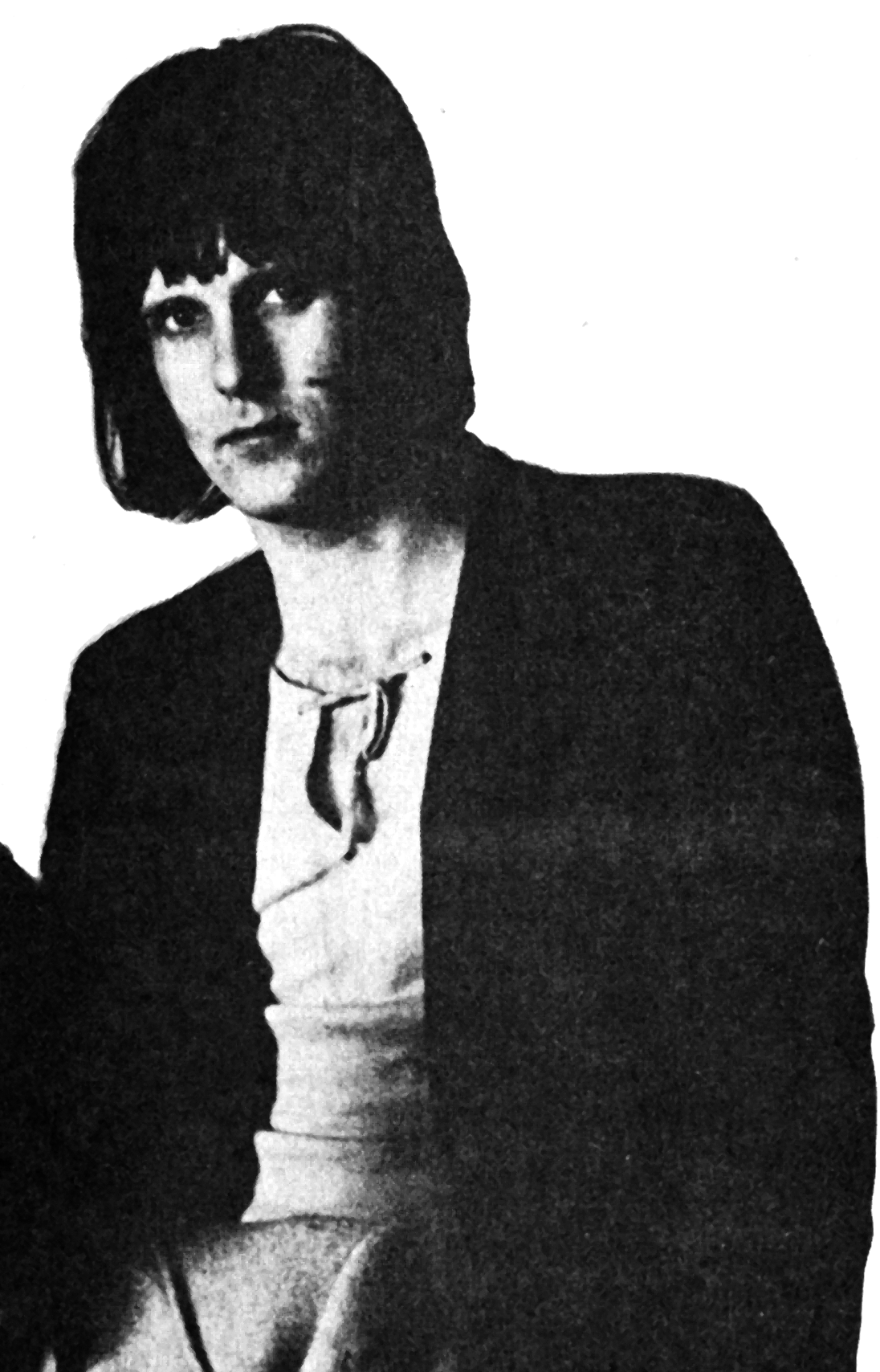
Emerson c. 1969 as a member of The Nice

In 1967, Emerson formed The Nice with Lee Jackson, also of the T-Bones, David O'List, and Ian Hague, after soul singer P. P. Arnold asked him to form a backing band. After replacing Hague with Brian Davison, the group set out on its own, quickly developing a strong live following. The group's sound was centred on Emerson's Hammond organ showmanship and theatrical abuse of the instrument, and their radical rearrangements of classical music themes as "symphonic rock". To increase the visual interest of his show, Emerson abused his Hammond L-100 organ by, among other things, hitting it, beating it with a whip, pushing it over, riding it across the stage like a horse, playing with it lying on top of him, and wedging knives into the keyboard. Some of these actions also produced musical sound effects: hitting the organ caused it to make explosion-like sounds, turning it over made it feed back, and the knives held down keys, thus sustaining notes. Emerson's show with The Nice has been cited as having a strong influence on heavy metal musicians.

Away from The Nice, Emerson was involved in the 1969 Music from Free Creek "supersession" project that included Eric Clapton and Jeff Beck. For the session, Emerson performed with drummer Mitch Mitchell and bassist Chuck Rainey covering, among other tunes, the Eddie Harris instrumental "Freedom Jazz Dance".

Emerson first heard a Moog synthesizer when a record shop owner played him Switched-On Bach (1968) by Wendy Carlos, and thought the instrument looked like "an electronic skiffle". He got into contact with keyboardist Mike Vickers, who had paid £4,000 to have one shipped from the US, and organised to play it at an upcoming The Nice concert at the Royal Festival Hall with the Royal Philharmonic Orchestra, in February and March 1970. Vickers helped patch the Moog, and the concert saw Emerson perform "Also sprach Zarathustra" by Richard Strauss with Vickers behind the machine to swap patches.

=== 1970–1979: Emerson, Lake & Palmer ===
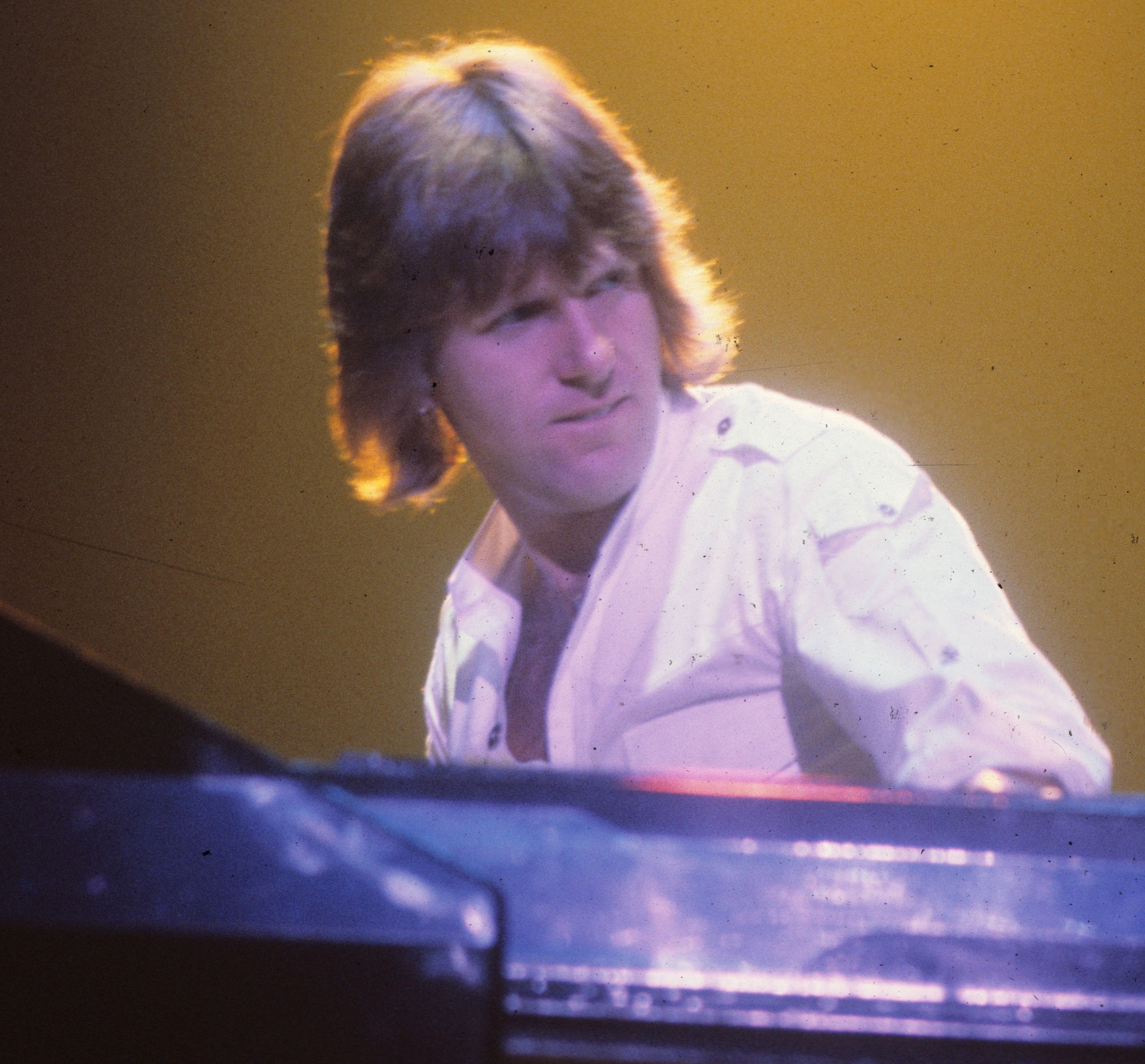
Emerson performing in concert with ELP in 1977

After The Nice split in March 1970, Emerson formed a new band, Emerson, Lake & Palmer (ELP), with bassist Greg Lake from King Crimson and drummer Carl Palmer from Atomic Rooster. After four months of rehearsal, the band played its first shows and recorded its first album, having quickly obtained a record deal with Atlantic Records. ELP became popular immediately after their 1970 Isle of Wight Festival performance, and continued to tour regularly throughout the 1970s. Not all were impressed, with BBC Radio 1 DJ John Peel describing their Isle of Wight set as a "tragic waste of talent and electricity". Their set, with a half-million onlookers, involved "annihilating their instruments in a classical-rock blitz" and firing cannons from the stage, which had been tested out on a field near Heathrow Airport.

==== Use of synthesizers ====
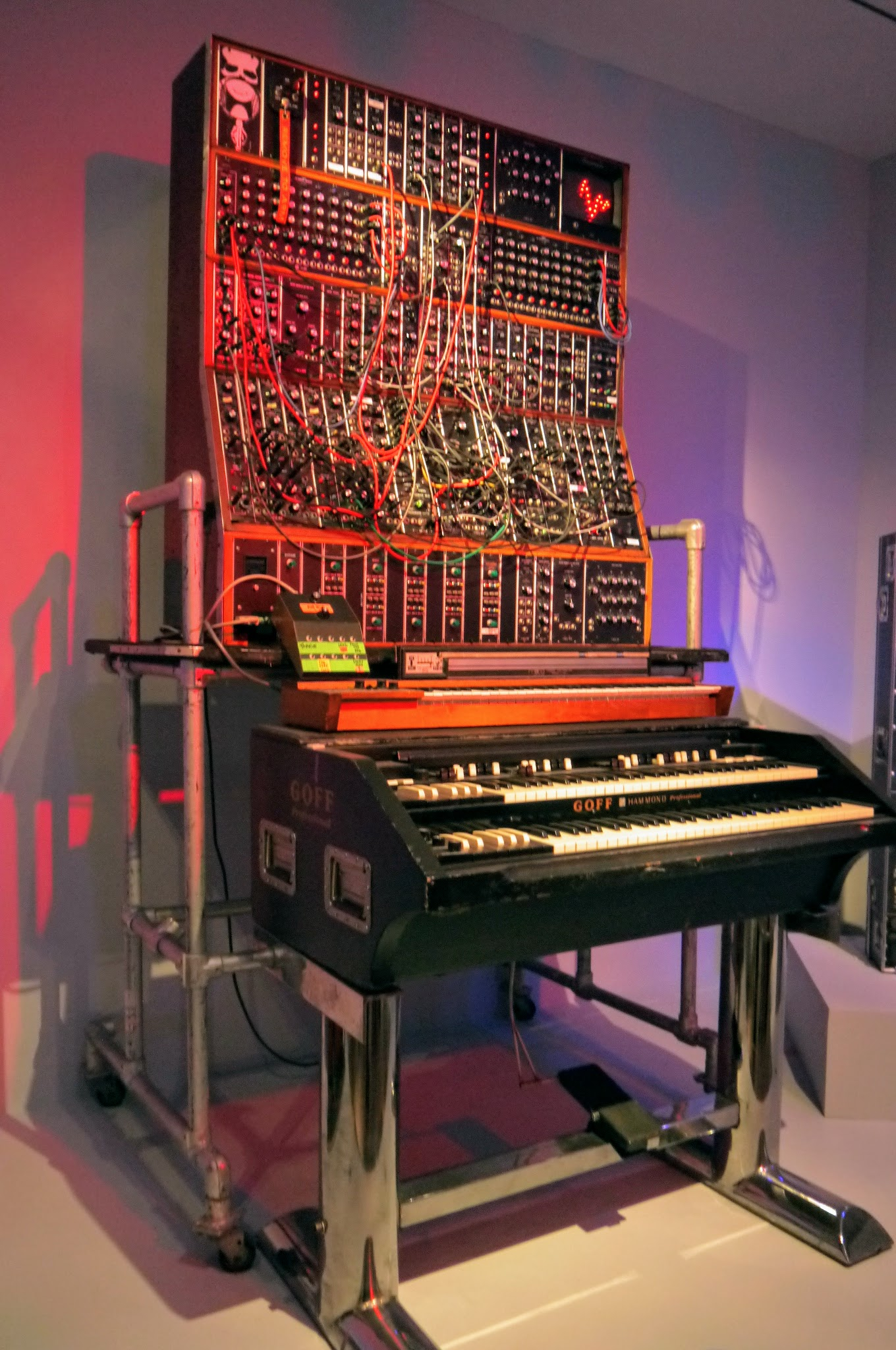
Keith Emerson's customized
- "Monster Moog" modular synth
- "Tarkus" Hammond C3 organ

ELP's record deal provided funds for Emerson to buy his own Moog modular synthesiser from the US, which was a preset model that had fewer leads and punch cards to call up certain patches. He used the patch that Vickers provided, which contained six distinctive Moog sounds and became the foundation of ELP's sound. It was a temperamental device, with the oscillators often going out of tune with temperature change. Emerson was the first artist to tour with a Moog synthesiser. His "Monster Moog", built from numerous modules, weighed 550 pounds (250 kg), stood 10 feet (3 m) tall and took four roadies to move. Even with its unpredictability, it became an indispensable component of not only ELP's concerts, but also Emerson's own. His use of the Moog was so critical to the development of new Moog models that he was given prototypes, such as the Constellation, which he took on one tour, and the Apollo, which had its début on "Jerusalem" on Brain Salad Surgery (1973). As synthesiser technology evolved, Emerson went on to use a variety of other synthesisers, including the Minimoog, Yamaha GX-1, and several models by Korg.

==== As composer and arranger ====
Emerson performed several notable rock arrangements of classical compositions, ranging from J. S. Bach and Modest Mussorgsky to 20th-century composers such as Béla Bartók, Aaron Copland, Leoš Janáček and Alberto Ginastera. Occasionally Emerson quoted from classical and jazz works without giving credit, particularly early in his career. An early example of Emerson's arranging was the song "Rondo" by The Nice, which is a 4/4 interpretation of Dave Brubeck's 9/8 composition "Blue Rondo à la Turk". During live performances the piece is introduced by an extensive excerpt from the 3rd movement of Bach's Italian Concerto.

On ELP's eponymous first album, Emerson's classical quotes went largely uncredited. In the 1973 reissue on the group's personal label, Manticore Records, the songs are credited correctly. By 1971, with the releases Pictures at an Exhibition and Trilogy, ELP began to fully credit classical composers, including Modest Mussorgsky for the piano piece which inspired the Pictures album, and Aaron Copland for "Hoedown" on the Trilogy album. Emerson indicated in an interview that he based his version of Pictures at an Exhibition on Mussorgsky's original piano composition, rather than on Maurice Ravel's later orchestration of the work.

Following ELP's 1974 tour, the members agreed to put the band on temporary hiatus and pursue individual solo projects. During this time, Emerson composed his "Piano Concerto No. 1" and recorded it with the London Philharmonic Orchestra. According to Emerson, he was motivated by critical comments suggesting that he relied upon adapting classical works because he was unable to write his own music, and further motivated by the London Philharmonic "who weren't that helpful to begin with" and "had the attitude of 'What's a rock musician doing writing a piano concerto?'" Emerson said, "I wanted people to say, look, I'm a composer, I do write my own music, and what greater challenge than to write a piano concerto." The recording later appeared on ELP's album Works Volume 1. Emerson's concerto has since been performed by classical pianists, most notably Jeffrey Biegel, who has performed it several times and recorded it with Emerson's permission.

In 1976, while still in ELP, Emerson also released his first solo record, the single "Honky Tonk Train Blues" b/w "Barrelhouse Shake-Down". "Honky Tonk Train Blues", Emerson's cover of a 1927 boogie-woogie piano song by Meade Lux Lewis, reached No. 21 on the UK Singles Chart.

==== Theatrics ====
In addition to his technical skills at playing and composing, Emerson was a theatrical performer. He cited guitarist Jimi Hendrix and organist Don Shinn as his chief theatrical influences. While in ELP, Emerson continued to some degree the physical abuse of his Hammond organ that he had developed with The Nice, including playing the organ upside down while having it lie over him and using knives to wedge down specific keys and sustain notes during solos. He also engaged in knife throwing using a target fastened in front of his Leslie speakers. He was given his trademark knife, an authentic Nazi dagger, by Lemmy Kilmister, who was a roadie for The Nice in his earlier days.

Emerson toned down his theatrics with the organ when ELP used more stage props for their shows. While touring Brain Salad Surgery from 1973 to 1974, at the end of the show, a sequencer in Emerson's Moog Modular synthesiser was set running at an increasing rate, with the synthesiser pivoting to face the audience while emitting smoke and deploying a large pair of silver bat wings from its back. The same tour featured one of Emerson's memorable live show stunts with ELP, which involved playing a piano suspended as high as 20 feet in mid-air and then rotated end-over-end with Emerson sitting at it. This was purely for visual effect, as the piano was fake and had no works inside, leaving Emerson to mime playing. Emerson was introduced to Bob McCarthy, former circus employee on Long Island, New York who demonstrated the stunt piano for him at his home. It was used for shows at Madison Square Garden in December 1973 and the California Jam in April 1974, which was filmed. Emerson said: "After that every TV show I did came the question ... Keith, how do you spin around on that piano? I'd say what about my music?'" The stunt caused Emerson to suffer multiple finger injuries and a broken nose. He wished to use it at the band's reunion concert in 2010, but was forbidden by the local authority who said that the plans did not meet health and safety standards.

=== 1979–1991: Solo and group projects ===
After ELP disbanded in 1979, Emerson pursued a variety of projects during the 1980s and 1990s, including solo releases, soundtrack work and other bands, including supergroup the Best. In the early 1990s, Emerson rejoined the reunited ELP, but the group broke up again by the end of that decade.

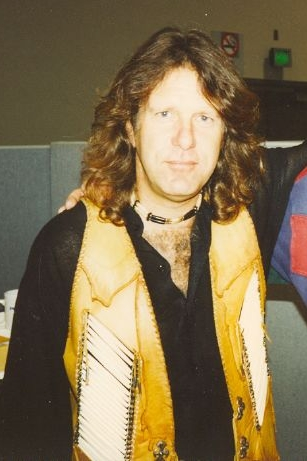
Emerson in the mid-1990s

==== Solo career ====
In 1981, Emerson released his debut solo album, Honky. Recorded in the Bahamas with local musicians, it departed from Emerson's usual style in featuring calypso and reggae songs, and was generally not well received, except in Italy where it was a hit. Emerson's subsequent solo releases were sporadic, including a Christmas album in 1988, and the album Changing States (also known as Cream of Emerson Soup) recorded in 1989 but not released until 1995, after several of its songs had already been re-recorded and released in different versions on ELP's 1992 comeback album Black Moon. Changing States also contained an orchestral remake of the ELP song "Abaddon's Bolero" with the London Philharmonic Orchestra, and "The Church", which Emerson composed for the 1989 Michele Soavi horror film of the same name.

==== Soundtrack work ====
In the 1980s, Emerson began to write and perform music for films, as his orchestral and classical style was more suited for film work than for the new wave-dominated pop/ rock market. He was given the script for Chariots of Fire, but turned down the offer to score it. Films for which Emerson contributed soundtrack music include Dario Argento's Inferno (1980), the action thriller Nighthawks (1981) starring Sylvester Stallone, (1984 film) Best Revenge, notable because he collaborated with Brad Delp from the rock band Boston and Levon Helm from The Band both on vocals, and Garth Hudson also from The Band on accordion, that also featured an instrumental piece called "Dream Runner" that became a standard solo performance piece for Emerson at ELP shows throughout the next decade, Lucio Fulci's Murder Rock (1984), and Michele Soavi's The Church (also known as La chiesa) (1989). He was also the composer for the short-lived 1994 US animated television series Iron Man.

==== 1980s and 1990s bands ====
Starting in the mid-1980s, Emerson formed several short-lived supergroups. The first two, Emerson, Lake & Powell (with Lake and ex-Rainbow drummer Cozy Powell) and 3 (with Palmer and American multi-instrumentalist Robert Berry), were intended to carry on in the general style of ELP in the absence of one of the original members. Emerson, Lake & Powell had some success, and their sole album is considered one of the best of both Emerson's and Lake's careers. Stylistically, it was a departure from their 1980s progressive rock peers, Genesis and Asia. Progressive rock analyst Edward Macan wrote that Emerson, Lake & Powell were closer to the "classic ELP sound" than ELP's own late-1970s output. By contrast, 3's only album sold poorly and drew comparisons to "the worst moments of Love Beach" (which had been a commercial disaster for ELP).

Emerson also toured briefly in 1990 with The Best, a supergroup including John Entwistle of The Who, Joe Walsh of the Eagles, Jeff "Skunk" Baxter of Steely Dan and The Doobie Brothers, and Simon Phillips. This project focused on covering songs from each of the members' past bands.

In the early 1990s, Emerson formed the short-lived group Aliens of Extraordinary Ability with Stuart Smith, Richie Onori, Marvin Sperling and Robbie Wyckoff. The group's name came from the application process for a US work visa, and the members included several British musicians who, like Emerson, had come to Los Angeles to further their careers. The group turned down a record deal with Samsung because of Emerson's commitment to an ELP reunion and Smith's involvement with a possible reformation of The Sweet.

=== 1991–1998: Reunion with ELP ===
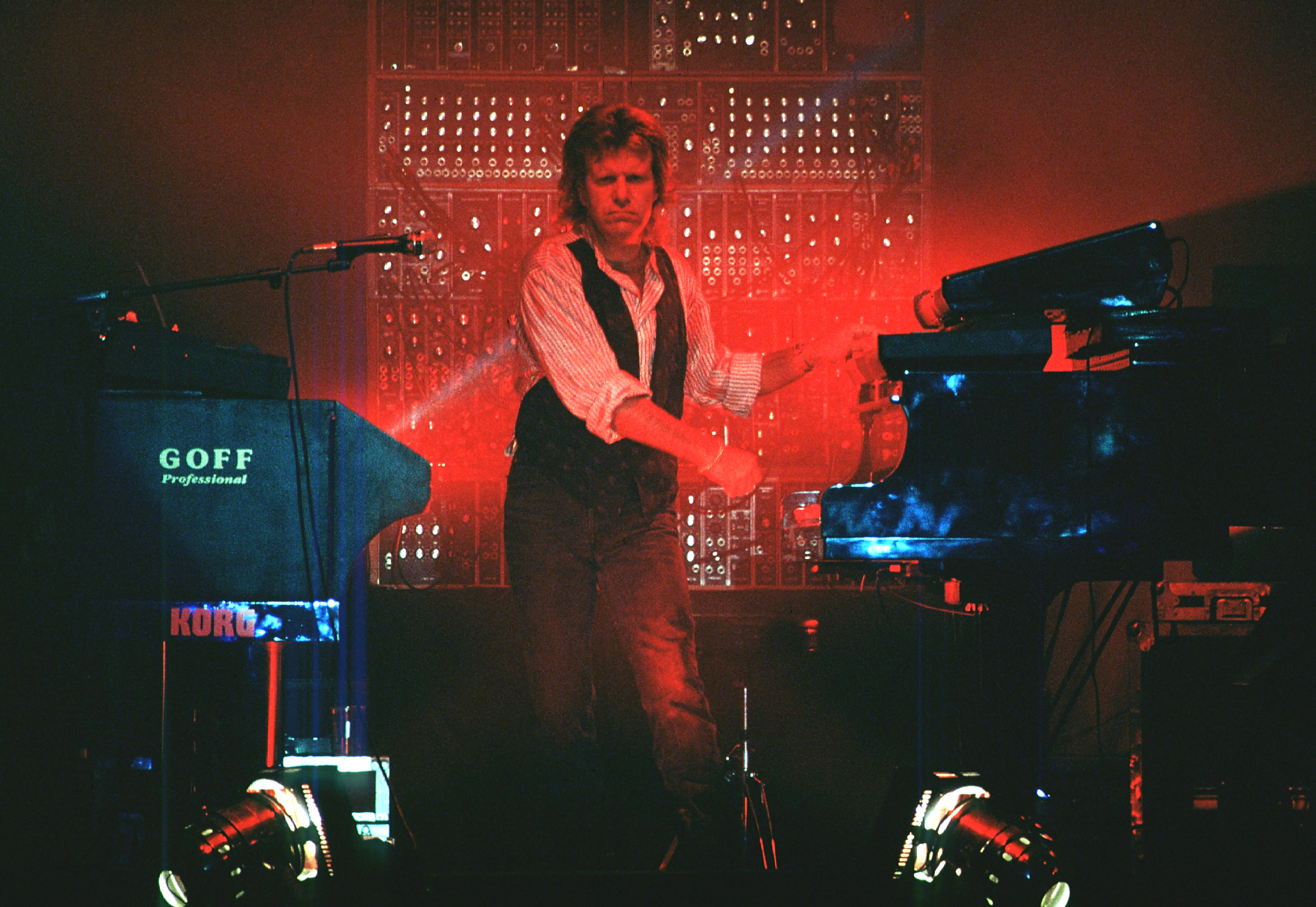
Emerson performing with ELP in 1992 with his "Pictures" Hammond C-3

In 1991, ELP reformed for two more albums (Black Moon (1992) and In the Hot Seat (1994)) and world tours in 1992–1993. After the 1993 tour, Emerson was forced to take a year off from playing due to a nerve condition affecting his right hand (see Health issues). Following his recovery, ELP resumed touring in 1996, including a successful US tour with Jethro Tull, but broke up again in August 1998.

=== 1998–2016 ===
Emerson participated in The Nice's reunion tour and a 40th anniversary show for ELP, preceded by a short duo tour with Greg Lake. Apart from these reunions, he continued his solo career, releasing solo and soundtrack albums, touring with his own Keith Emerson Band, and making occasional guest appearances. Starting in 2010, he increasingly focused on orchestral collaborations. A documentary film based on his autobiography was reportedly in production at the time of his death in 2016.

==== Reunion shows ====
In 2002 Emerson reformed and toured with The Nice, though performing a longer set of ELP music using a backing band including guitarist/vocalist Dave Kilminster. During the spring of 2010, he toured with Greg Lake in the United States and Canada, doing a series of "Intimate Evening" duo shows in which they performed newly arranged versions of the music of Emerson, Lake & Palmer, The Nice, and King Crimson as well as Emerson's new original composition. On 25 July 2010, a one-off Emerson, Lake & Palmer reunion concert closed the High Voltage Festival as the main act in Victoria Park, East London, to commemorate the band's 40th anniversary.

==== Solo career and Keith Emerson Band ====
Emerson continued his solo and soundtrack work into the 2000s. His solo releases included the all-piano album Emerson Plays Emerson (2002), several compilations, and contributions to Pink Floyd and Led Zeppelin tribute albums (see Discography). He was also one of three composers who contributed to the soundtrack for the Japanese kaiju film Godzilla: Final Wars (2004).

Following the August 2008 release of the album Keith Emerson Band Featuring Marc Bonilla, Emerson also toured with his own self-named band in Russia, the Baltic States and Japan between August and October 2008. The tour band members were Marc Bonilla, Travis Davis and Tony Pia.

==== Orchestral collaborations ====
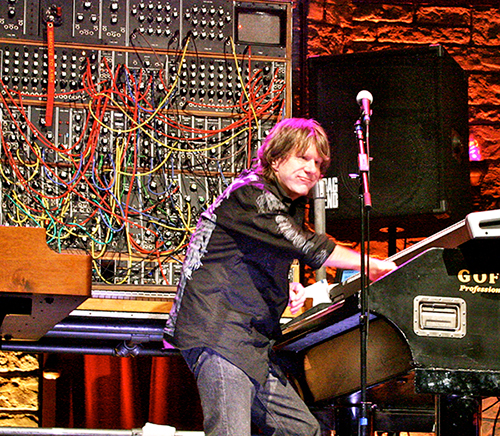
Emerson with his "Monster Moog" synthesizer and GOFF Professional modified “Tarkus Hammond C-3 , May 2010

Japanese composer Takashi Yoshimatsu worked with Emerson to create an arrangement of ELP's song "Tarkus", which premiered on 14 March 2010, performed by the Tokyo Philharmonic Orchestra. Yoshimatsu's arrangement has been featured in multiple live performances and two live recordings.

In September 2011, Emerson began working with Norwegian conductor Terje Mikkelsen, along with the Keith Emerson Band featuring Marc Bonilla and the Munich Radio Orchestra, on new orchestral renditions of ELP classics and their new compositions. The project "The Three Fates" was premiered in Norway in early September 2012, supervised by Norwegian professor and musician Bjørn Ole Rasch for the Norwegian Simax label. The work received its UK live premiere on 10 July 2015 at London's Barbican Centre, with the BBC Concert Orchestra, as part of the celebration of the life and work of Robert Moog.

Emerson made his conducting debut with Orchestra Kentucky of Bowling Green, Kentucky in September 2013. In October 2014, Emerson conducted the South Shore Symphony at his 70th birthday tribute concert at Molloy College in Rockville Centre, New York. The concert also featured the premiere of his Three String Quartets, and a performance of Emerson's "Piano Concerto No. 1" by Jeffrey Biegel.

==== Other appearances and activities ====
In 2000, Emerson was a featured panelist and performer at "The Keyboard Meets Modern Technology", an event honouring Moog presented by the Smithsonian in Washington, D.C., in conjunction with a gallery exhibition celebrating the 300th anniversary of the piano. Emerson later headlined both the first and third Moogfest, a festival held in honour of Robert Moog, at the B. B. King Blues Club & Grill at Times Square in New York City, in 2004 and 2006 respectively.

Emerson opened the Led Zeppelin reunion/Ahmet Ertegun Tribute Concert at the O2 Arena in London on 10 December 2007, along with Chris Squire and Alan White (Yes) and Simon Kirke (Bad Company/Free). The supergroup played a new arrangement of "Fanfare for the Common Man". Emerson also made a guest appearance in 2009 on Spinal Tap's album Back from the Dead, and played on several songs at Spinal Tap's "One Night Only World Tour" at Wembley Arena on 30 June 2009.

In 2004 Emerson published his autobiography entitled Pictures of an Exhibitionist, which dealt with his life up to his nearly career-ending nerve-graft surgery in 1993. In 2007, Emerson began working with Canadian independent filmmaker Jason Woodford to make a documentary film based on his autobiography. As of March 2016, production was still ongoing and the filmmakers were seeking funding to finish the film, according to the webpage of an artists' management company representing Emerson.

== Personal life ==
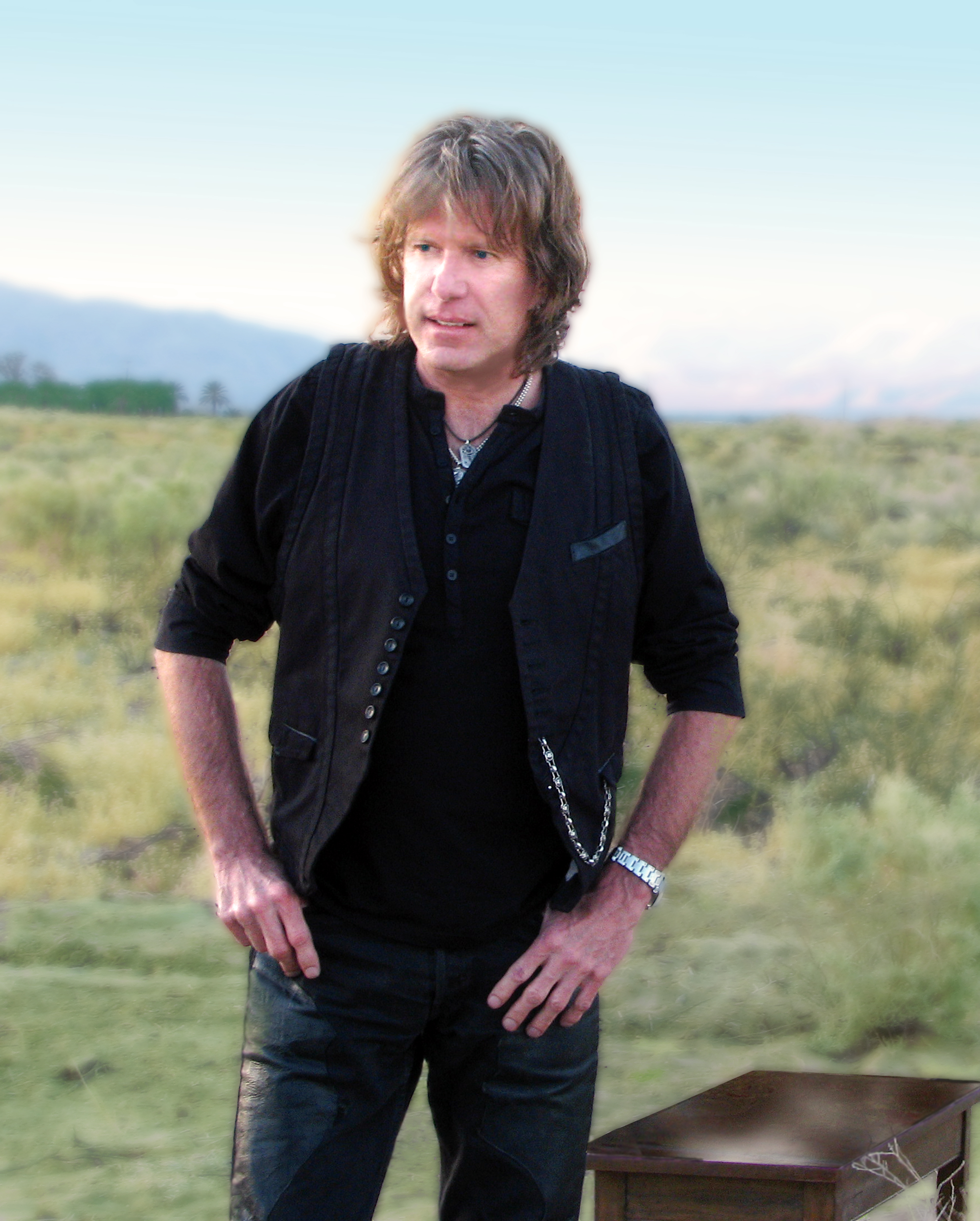
Emerson in 2008

Around the Christmas of 1969, Emerson married his Danish girlfriend Elinor Lund. They had two sons before they divorced in 1994. Emerson said it was his fault, as he had "fallen in love with someone else." Emerson then had a long-term relationship with Mari Kawaguchi.

In April 1975, Emerson's Sussex house burned down and he relocated to London.

Emerson enjoyed flying as a hobby, and he obtained his pilot's licence in 1972. When Emerson moved to Santa Monica, California in the mid-1990s, John Lydon, who had openly and harshly criticised ELP during the 1970s when Lydon was a member of the punk rock band Sex Pistols, was Emerson's neighbour. The two became friends, with Lydon saying in a 2007 interview, "He's a great bloke". In 2002, Emerson was in the process of returning to live in England.

=== Health issues ===
In 1993, Emerson was forced to take a year off from playing after he developed a nerve-related condition affecting his right hand that he likened to "writer's cramp", and that was also reported as a form of arthritis. It marked a low period for Emerson, who was going through a divorce and having financial difficulties. He turned to alcohol, before a course of psychotherapy led to his move to Santa Monica. During his time off, he ran marathons, customised a Harley-Davidson motorcycle, and wrote film scores and his autobiography, Pictures of an Exhibitionist, which opens and closes with an account of his illness and subsequent arm operation. Emerson later stated the operation was unnecessary, as the procedure had destroyed a few nerve endings. He attributed the original damage to the ulnar nerve in his right arm, due to a whiplash injury received during a motorcycle accident.

In 2002, Emerson had regained the full use of his hands and could play to his usual strength. In 2016, he was corresponding with a carpal-tunnel syndrome expert about his struggle with focal dystonia, who said "Musicians can't talk about it because they won't get another gig if word gets out that they're in pain so they keep quiet."

In September 2010, Emerson underwent immediate surgery after a routine colonoscopy had revealed a "rather dangerous" polyp in his lower colon.

== Death ==
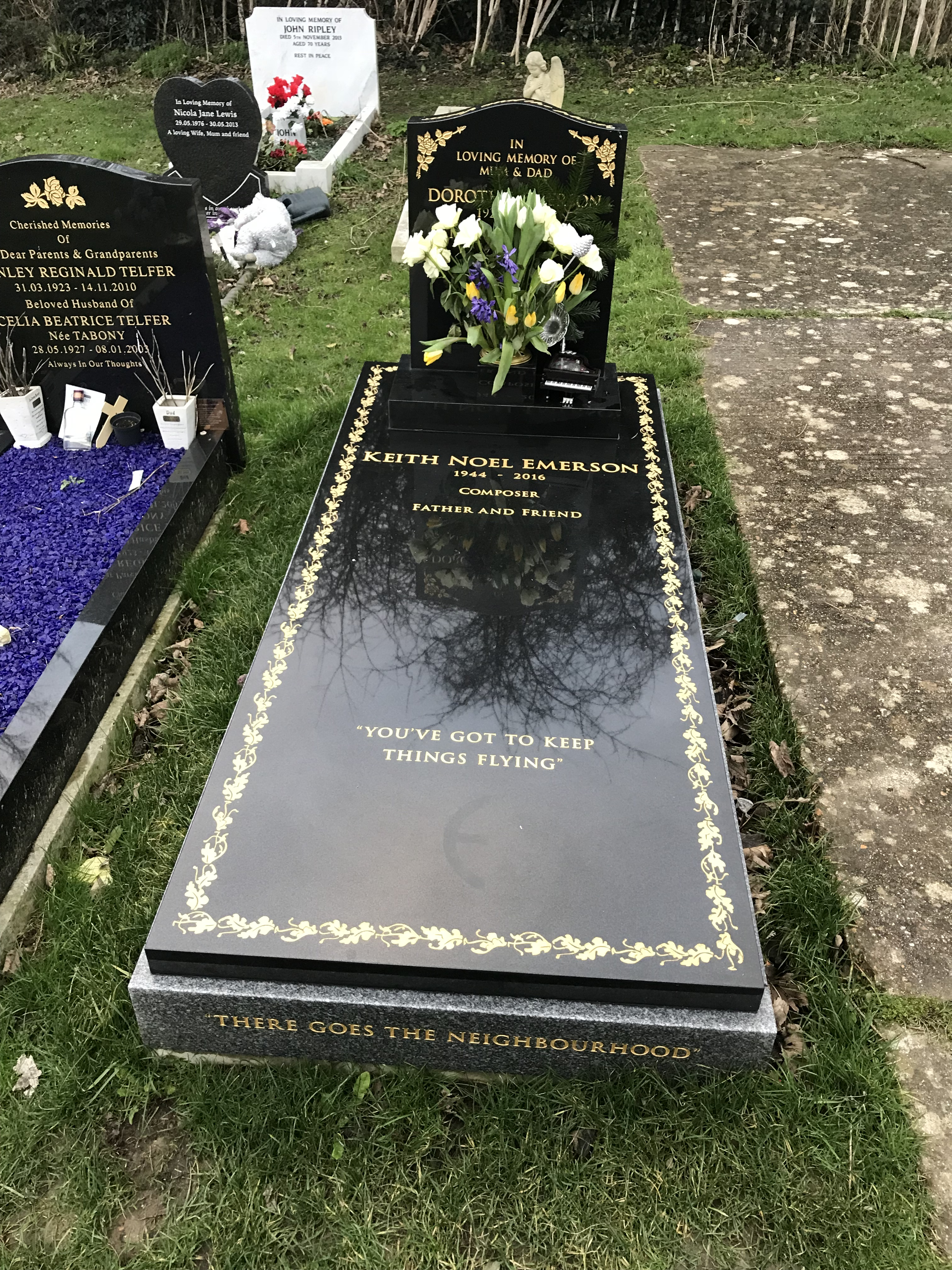
Emerson's grave in Lancing, West Sussex

Emerson died on 11 March 2016 in Santa Monica, California, of a self-inflicted gunshot wound to the head. His body was found at his Santa Monica home. Following a post-mortem, the medical examiner ruled Emerson's death a suicide, and concluded that he also had heart disease and depression associated with alcohol. According to Emerson's girlfriend Mari Kawaguchi, Emerson had become "depressed, nervous, and anxious" because nerve damage had hampered his playing, and he was worried that he would perform poorly at upcoming concerts in Japan and disappoint his fans.

Emerson was buried on 1 April 2016 at Lancing and Sompting Cemetery, Lancing, West Sussex. Although his death had been reported by news sources and an official Emerson, Lake and Palmer social media page as having occurred on the night of 10 March, his grave memorial gives his date of death as 11 March 2016. (Note: Emerson's death occurred on 10 March local time, which was 11 March in the UK)

His former ELP bandmates, Carl Palmer and Greg Lake, both issued statements on his death. Palmer said, "Keith was a gentle soul whose love for music and passion for his performance as a keyboard player will remain unmatched for many years to come." Lake said, "As sad and tragic as Keith's death is, I would not want this to be the lasting memory people take away with them. What I will always remember about Keith Emerson was his remarkable talent as a musician and composer and his gift and passion to entertain. Music was his life and despite some of the difficulties he encountered I am sure that the music he created will live on forever." Lake died later that same year of pancreatic cancer.

A tribute concert featuring Brian Auger, Jordan Rudess, Eddie Jobson, Aaron Emerson, Steve Lukather, Steve Porcaro, Marc Bonilla, and Rachel Flowers took place at the El Rey Theatre. Proceeds from sales of the DVD go to the Dystonia Medical Research Foundation.

== Playing style ==
Emerson sometimes reached into the interior of his piano and hit, plucked, or strummed the strings with his hand. He said that as a keyboard player, he hated the idea of being "static" and that to avoid it, he "wanted to get inside the piano, brush the strings, stick Ping-Pong balls inside". "Take a Pebble" included Emerson strumming the strings of his piano, a technique pioneered by avant-garde composer Henry Cowell, referred to as string piano. In the Nice's 1968 live performance of "Hang on to a Dream" on the German television program Beat-Club (later released on DVD in 1997), Emerson can be seen and heard reaching inside his grand piano at one point and plucking its strings.

In addition to such experimentation, Emerson also incorporated unique musical stylization into his work. Emerson is recognized for having integrated different sounds into his writing, utilizing methods of both horizontal and vertical contrast. Horizontal contrast is the use of distinct styles in a piece of music, combined by alternating between two different segments (in Emerson's case, most frequently alternating classical and non-classical); this technique can be seen in numerous works, such as "Rondo", "Tantalising Maggie", "The Thoughts of Emerlist Davjack" and others. Vertical contrast is the combination of multiple styles simultaneously; Emerson frequently played a given style with one hand and a contrasting one with the other. This structure can be seen in works such as "Intermezzo from the Karelia Suite", "Rondo", and others. Emerson's love of modern music such as Copland and Bartok was evident in his open voicings and use of fifths and fourths, "Fanfare" emulated guitar power chords. He also used dissonance, atonality, sonata and fugue forms, exposing rock and roll audiences to myriad classical styles from Bach to Stravinsky.

== Instrumentation ==
Emerson used a variety of electronic keyboard instruments during his career, including two Hammond C-3 organs rebuilt and customized by Al Goff, GOFF Professional- the Pictures at an Exhibition or “Pictures” C-3 and his “Tarkus” C-3 that he played and toured with up until his death. Keith used many different Leslie speaker models over the years and preferred two GOFF Professional Leslie 122’s due to the vacuum tube amplifiers and classic tube-amp sound. He also owned and played several Hammond organs and synthesisers by Moog Music, Yamaha, and Korg. From time to time he also used other instruments such as pipe organs, a grand piano, a clavinet, and very briefly, a Mellotron. During his ELP years, Emerson toured with a large amount of gear, taking thirteen keyboard units to a December 1973 show at Madison Square Garden, and later travelling with a large Yamaha GX-1 that required eight roadies to move it. Michael "Supe" Granda of The Ozark Mountain Daredevils recalled Emerson's organ rig as being "as large as [the Daredevils'] entire stage plot".

=== Pre-ELP equipment and Hammond organs ===
Initially a piano player, Emerson obtained his first Hammond organ, an L-100, after hearing jazz organist Jack McDuff and becoming frustrated with broken hammers inside pianos. Around 1968, during his time with the Nice, he added a second Hammond organ, the more expensive C-3, and placed the two organs sideways and facing each other so he could stand between the two keyboards and play both with his unobstructed body facing the audience. Emerson preferred the sound of the C-3 as being "far superior" to the cheaper L-100, and used the L-100 to "throw around and make it feed back". Emerson got the L-100 to feed back by placing it close to the onstage speakers and using a fuzzbox. He continued to perform physical abuse stunts with the L-100 to some degree throughout his years with ELP.

Throughout his career, Emerson owned a number of Hammond L-100 models in various states of repair to support his act. These organs were also specially reinforced and modified to enhance their sound and help prevent damage while on tour, and were reported to weigh approximately 200 pounds. By contrast, his “Tarkus” C-3 organ and “Pictures” C-3 organ were not used for stunts. Emerson continued to play his original GOFF Professional “Tarkus” C-3 for many years, using it on all the ELP albums and tours throughout the 1970s. He used his “Pictures” Hammond C-3 for the Pictures at an Exhibition album and toured, and later on the Black Moon album and tour. He also owned several other Hammond organ models in addition to the L-100s and the C-3 but preferred playing his Tarkus C-3 and 2 Leslie 122’s as they were custom modified for him by Al Goff. When Emerson sold much of his gear in the mid-1990s, his Hammond organs were among the items he kept as being "too personal to let go". The remains of one L-100 that failed and burned during a 1990s ELP show in Boston were initially donated to the Rock and Roll Hall of Fame but was subsequently transferred to the Electronic Music Education and Preservation Project (EMEAPP) in Harleysville, PA. Keith’s Moog synthesizer, Hammond C-3 organs and Leslie 122 speakers are also now owned by EMEAPP. https://emeapp.org/about-emeapp/

=== ELP equipment and Moog synthesisers ===
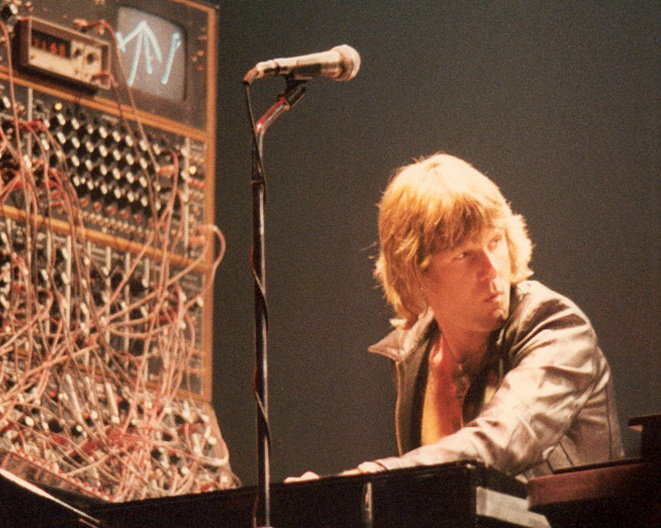
Emerson with the Moog synthesizer (c.1977)

With ELP, Emerson added the Moog synthesiser behind the Tarkus Hammond C-3 with the Moog keyboard and ribbon controller stacked on the top of the organ. The ribbon controller allowed Emerson to vary pitch, volume or timbre of the output from the Moog by moving his finger up and down the length of a touch-sensitive strip. It also could be used as a phallic symbol, and outfitted with a small rocket launcher, it quickly became a feature of the act. He continued to divide his keyboard setup into two banks so that he could play between them with his body in view. When the ultra-compact Moog Minimoog first appeared it was placed where needed, such as on top of the grand piano. A Hohner clavinet L, with reversed black and white keys, was also part of Emerson's keyboard rig. Although it could be heard on numerous album pieces, according to Emerson, it was only used for one song, "Nut Rocker" in concert.

During the Brain Salad Surgery tour of 1974, Emerson's keyboard setup included the Hammond C-3 organ, run through multiple Leslie speakers driven by HiWatt guitar amplifiers, the Moog 3C modular synthesiser (modified by addition of various modules and an oscilloscope) with ribbon controller, a Steinway concert grand piano with a Minimoog synthesiser on top of it, an upright acoustic-electric piano that was used for honky-tonk piano sounds, a Hohner Clavinet and another Minimoog synthesiser. Emerson also used a prototype polyphonic synthesiser produced by Moog, which was the test bed for the Moog Polymoog polyphonic synthesiser. The original synthesiser setup as envisioned by Moog was called the Constellation, and consisted of three instruments – the polyphonic synthesiser, called the Apollo, a monophonic lead synthesiser called the Lyra, and a bass-pedal synthesiser, called the Taurus, but Emerson never used the Taurus.

=== Pipe organs ===
Occasionally Emerson used a pipe organ, when available, in live performances and on recordings. He played the Royal Albert Hall Organ at a show with The Nice on 26 June 1968, where the band controversially burned a painting of an American flag onstage to protest against the Vietnam War. The stunt caused a storm of objections in the US and The Nice received a lifetime ban from the venue.

With ELP, Emerson used the Royal Festival Hall organ for the "Clotho" segment of "The Three Fates" on the 1970 eponymous debut album by ELP. He played this organ again in 2002 to open The Nice reunion tour show, but according to a reviewer, the organ failed to operate at the expected volume.

The Newcastle City Hall organ was used for the introductory section of Pictures at an Exhibition, recorded there live on 26 March 1971. Emerson was recorded playing the organ at St. Mark's Church in London for "The Only Way (Hymn)" on the 1971 ELP album Tarkus.

=== Yamaha Electone GX-1 synthesiser ===
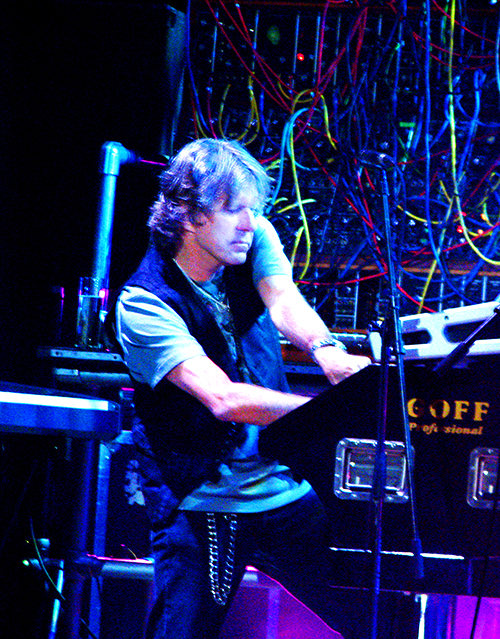
Emerson performing on his “Tarkus” Hammond C-3 in Saint Petersburg, Russia, September 2008

After founder Robert Moog left Moog Music in the late 1970s, Emerson began to consider using synthesisers made by other companies. Emerson became one of the few buyers of the Yamaha GX-1 polyphonic synthesiser, which reportedly cost almost $50,000. The GX-1 was subsequently used on the ELP album Works Volume 1, particularly on the song "Fanfare for the Common Man", and on tour. It can be seen in ELP's Works Orchestral Tour video and in promotional photos and videos from 1977 featuring the band playing "Fanfare" outdoors during a snowstorm in Montreal's Olympic Stadium. Emerson later bought a second GX-1 from John Paul Jones of Led Zeppelin, and used parts from it to repair his original GX-1, which was damaged by a tractor crashing into Emerson's home studio.

Emerson sold much of his keyboard equipment in the 1990s when he relocated from England to Santa Monica, California. The John Paul Jones GX-1 was sold to film composer Hans Zimmer, while Emerson's original GX-1 was sold to Italian keyboardist Riccardo Grotto.

=== Korg synthesisers ===
In the late 1970s, Emerson also began to use the Korg PS-3300 and PS-3100, which at the time were among the world's first fully polyphonic synthesizers. These Korgs appeared on the ELP album Love Beach, and Emerson continued to use them into the 1980s for his solo album Honky and his soundtrack work. He also became an official endorser for the PS-3300 and PS-3100 in the early 1980s.

By the late 2000s, Emerson was employing "a host of Korg gear" including the Korg OASYS and Korg Triton Extreme music workstation synthesisers. A review of the DVD release of ELP's 2010 one-off reunion show said that the Korg OASYS "appear[ed] to be Emerson's go-to instrument", although he also used a Hammond C-3 and a Moog with a ribbon controller onstage.

== Honours and awards ==
In December 1980 Contemporary Keyboard magazine announced, in their Fifth Annual Readers' Poll, that Emerson had—for the fifth time in a row—captured first place in two categories – '"Overall Best Keyboardist" and "Best Multi-Keyboardist". The five-time wins put Emerson in their "Gallery Of The Greats" for both categories. The same poll also saw Emerson take "Best Rock Organist" for the fourth time and "Best Lead Synthesist".

In March 2010 Emerson received the annual Frankfurt Music Prize for his achievements, awarded in Frankfurt on the eve of the annual Musikmesse fair.

In September 2013 Orchestra Kentucky of Bowling Green gave Emerson their Lifetime Achievement Award in the Arts and Humanities "for his role in bringing classical music to the masses".

In 2014 Emerson was inducted into the Hammond Hall of Fame by the Hammond Organ Company.

== Discography ==
=== Solo works ===
==== Studio albums ====
- Honky (1981) (digitally re-mastered 2013)
- The Christmas Album (1988)
- Changing States (1995)
- Emerson Plays Emerson (2002)
- Keith Emerson Band featuring Marc Bonilla (2008)
- The Three Fates Project (with Marc Bonilla, Terje Mikkelsen) (2012)

==== Live albums ====
- Boys Club – Live from California (with Glenn Hughes, Marc Bonilla) (2009)
- Moscow (with Keith Emerson Band Featuring Marc Bonilla) CD & DVD (2010)
- Live from Manticore Hall (with Greg Lake) (2010)

==== Soundtrack albums ====
- Inferno (1980)
- Nighthawks (1981)
- Murderock (1984)
- Best Revenge (1985)
- Harmageddon/China Free Fall (1987) — Split album with Derek Austin. Emerson did the Harmageddon soundtrack while Austin did the China Free Fall soundtrack.
- Iron Man Vol. 1 (2001)
- La Chiesa (2002) — Music from the 1989 horror film The Church, also known as La chiesa. Also contains material by Fabio Pignatelli and Goblin.
- Godzilla: Final Wars (2004)

==== Compilations ====
- Chord Sampler (1984)
- The Emerson Collection (1986)
- At the Movies (2005)
- Hammer It Out – The Anthology (2005)
- Off the Shelf (2006)

==== Singles ====
- "Honky Tonk Train Blues" (Lewis) b/w "Barrelhouse Shake-Down" (1976) — [ITA #1] [UK #21]

=== Contributions ===
- "In the Flesh?" (2 versions) and "Waiting for the Worms" on Pink Floyd tribute album Back Against the Wall (2005)
- "Black Dog" on Led Zeppelin tribute album Led Box: The Ultimate Led Zeppelin Tribute (2008)
- Ayreon – "Progressive Waves" on The Theory of Everything (2013)
- Spinal Tap – "Heavy Duty" on Back from the Dead

=== As part of a group ===
- The Nice discography
- Emerson, Lake & Palmer discography
- Emerson, Lake & Powell discography
- 3 discography
- The Best A band including Joe Walsh, Jeff "Skunk" Baxter, John Entwistle and Simon Phillips, they recorded a DVD of a live concert in Yokohama Japan, on the 26 September 1990 which was published in 2010.

== Pieces based on other works ==
Emerson occasionally covered or sampled other musical works in his compositions. Permission to use pieces was sometimes denied by the composer or his family; for example Gustav Holst's daughter refused to grant official permission for rock bands to perform her late father's composition Mars, the Bringer of War. However, a number of composers did grant permission for their works to be used. Aaron Copland said that there was "something that attracted [him]" about ELP's version of "Fanfare for the Common Man", and so approved its use, although he said, "What they do in the middle (i.e., the modal section between repeats of Copland's theme), I'm not sure exactly how they connect that with my music". Alberto Ginastera, on the other hand, enthusiastically approved Emerson's electronic realisation of the fourth movement of his first piano concerto, which appeared on their album Brain Salad Surgery under the title "Toccata". Ginastera said, "You have captured the essence of my music, and no one's ever done that before."

=== With The Nice ===
- "America, 2nd Amendment", from West Side Story's "America", by Leonard Bernstein, credited, quoting Antonín Dvořák's Symphony No. 9, From the New World, uncredited.
- "Rondo", derived from Dave Brubeck's "Blue Rondo à la Turk", uncredited, quoting Bach, Italian Concerto third movement, uncredited.
- "Diary of an Empty Day", from Symphonie Espagnole by Édouard Lalo, credited.
- "Azrael Revisited", quoting Sergei Rachmaninoff's Prelude in C-sharp minor, credited.
- "Ars Longa Vita Brevis" – Bach, the third Brandenburg Concerto, Allegro, credited.
- "Intermezzo from the Karelia Suite" – Sibelius, credited.
- "Pathetique", third movement from Tchaikovsky's Symphony No. 6, credited.
- "She Belongs to Me", by Bob Dylan, credited, quoting Bach, uncredited, and fragments of the theme from The Magnificent Seven, by Elmer Bernstein, uncredited.
- "Country Pie", by Bob Dylan, credited, lyrics partly set to Bach, the sixth Brandenburg Concerto, credited.

=== With ELP ===
- "The Barbarian", based on Allegro barbaro, Sz. 49, BB 63 by Béla Bartók, uncredited on US release of Emerson Lake & Palmer (credited on the British Manticore re-pressing of the original LP).
- "Knife-Edge", based on the Sinfonietta by Leoš Janáček, uncredited on US release (credited on the British Manticore re-pressing of the original LP); middle section based on the Allemande from French Suites No. 1 in D minor, by J. S. Bach, uncredited.
- "The Only Way (Hymn)", incorporating (in the song's introduction and bridge) J. S. Bach's 'Organ Toccata in F and Prelude VI from Book I of the Well-Tempered Clavier', credited on Tarkus.
- "Are You Ready Eddy?", based on the tune of Bobby Troup's song "The Girl Can't Help It" and including a quote from the Assembly bugle call, both uncredited (on Tarkus).
- Pictures at an Exhibition, by Modest Mussorgsky, credited.
- "Blues Variation" from Pictures at an Exhibition also contains an uncredited quote of the 'head' of Bill Evans' minor blues piece "Interplay" (1:52), and Miles Davis' "Weirdo"(Ballads and Blues (Miles Davis album)), (aka Walkin') (2:45).
- "Nut Rocker", adapted by Kim Fowley, credited, from Tchaikovsky's "March of the Wooden Soldiers", uncredited.
- "Hoedown", from Rodeo by Aaron Copland, credited, quoting "Shortnin' Bread" and "Turkey in the Straw", both traditional.
- "Abaddon's Bolero", quoting "The Girl I Left Behind", traditional.
- "Jerusalem", by C. Hubert H. Parry, credited.
- "Maple Leaf Rag", by Scott Joplin (in Works Volume 2), credited.
- "Toccata", from a piano concerto by Alberto Ginastera, endorsed by the composer, credited.
- "Karn Evil 9, 2nd Impression", quoting "St. Thomas", a Caribbean melody sometimes attributed to Sonny Rollins, uncredited.
- "Fanfare for the Common Man", by Aaron Copland, credited.
- Carmina Burana, by Carl Orff, quoted in an extended solo in live recordings from Poland.
- With Emerson, Lake & Powell, the main theme to "Touch & Go" is identical to the English folk song "Lovely Joan", better known as the counterpoint tune in Ralph Vaughan Williams' Fantasia on Greensleeves. Not credited.
- With Emerson, Lake & Powell, "Mars" is based on the equivalent movement from the suite The Planets, by Gustav Holst. Credited.
- "Romeo & Juliet" from the Romeo and Juliet suite by Sergei Prokofiev, credited.
- "Love at First Sight" intro, Étude Op. 10, No. 1, by Frédéric Chopin, uncredited.

== Songs composed by Emerson (alone or with contributions from others) ==
Besides his "Piano Concerto", there are several examples of Emerson creativity in original composition. Since the late 1960s he wrote a wide typology of pieces in different musical styles ranging from pop rock songs such as "Flower King of Flies", "The Thoughts of Emerlist Davjack", "Happy Freuds" to complex pieces including transversal influences from baroque to contemporary and jazz, anticipating the progressive genre ("For Example", "Five Bridges Suite"). During the 1970s alongside arrangements of classic tracks and Lake's ballads, a decisive element of EL&P's albums are the compositions featuring music entirely written by Emerson. His trademark is a varied range of musical approach: songs with a hard rock impact with a jazz flavour such as "Bitches Crystal", "A Time and a Place", "Living Sin", examples of country or stride piano such as "Jeremy Bender" or "Benny the Bouncer", and adventurous instrumentals difficult to classify in one genre, such as "The Three Fates", "Tank" and "Abaddon's Bolero".

The more structured and complex epic tracks such as "Tarkus", "Trilogy", "The Endless Enigma", "Karn Evil 9", "Pirates", "Memoirs of an Officer and a Gentleman" are all Emerson's compositions. As a soloist, after his "Piano Concerto" a period of compositions recorded with the orchestra opened during the early 1980s ("Inferno", "Nighthawks", "Orchestral Suite to Best Revenge"). In the following decades Emerson composed many pieces for piano, such as "The Dreamer", "And Then January", "Outgoing Tide", "Broken Bough" and "Soulscapes", displaying an intimate and crepuscular inspiration, also reiterated in orchestral pieces such as "Glorietta Pass" and "After All of This". A return to the visionary and tumultuous style of progressive music is represented by the album recorded under the name of the Keith Emerson Band, which includes the long suite "The House Of Ocean Born Mary" co-written with Marc Bonilla.

See the section below for a list of songs composed or co-composed by Emerson.

=== With Keith Emerson Trio ===
- "Winkle Picker Stamp" (Emerson)
- "56 Blues" (Emerson)

=== With The Nice ===
- "Flower King" of Flies (Emerson; lyrics: Jackson)
- "The Thoughts of Emerlist Davjack" (O'List, Emerson)
- "Tantalising Maggie" (Emerson; lyrics: Jackson)
- "Dawn" (Davison, Emerson, Jackson)
- "The Cry of Eugene" (O'List, Emerson, Jackson)
- "The Diamond Hard Blue Apples Of The Moon" (Emerson, O'List, Davison, Jackson)
- "Daddy Where Did I Come From?" (Emerson; lyrics: Jackson)
- "Little Arabella" (Emerson; lyrics: Jackson)
- "Happy Freuds" (Emerson; lyrics: Jackson)
- "Ars Longa Vita Brevis: Prelude, 2nd Movement", "4th Movement e Coda" (Emerson, O'List, Davison, Jackson)
- "For Example" (Emerson; lyrics: Jackson)
- "The Five Bridges Suite: Fantasia, Chorale, High Level Fugue, Finale"
- "One of Those People" (Emerson; lyrics: Jackson)

=== With Emerson Lake & Palmer/Emerson Lake & Powell/Three ===
- "The Three Fates: Clotho, Lachesis, Atropos" (Emerson)
- "Tank" (Emerson, Palmer)
- "Rave Up" (Emerson, Lake, Palmer)
- "Tarkus: Eruption, Stones of Years, Iconoclast, Mass, Manticore, Aquatarkus" (Emerson; lyrics: Lake)
- "Jeremy Bender" (Emerson; lyrics: Lake)
- "Bitches Crystal" (Emerson; lyrics: Lake)
- "The Only Way/Infinite Space" (Emerson, Bach; lyrics: Lake)
- "A Time and a Place" (Emerson, Lake, Palmer)
- "The Old Castle" (Emerson, Mussorgsky)
- "Blues Variation" (Emerson, Lake, Palmer)
- "The Curse Of Baba Yaga" (Emerson, Lake, Palmer)
- "The Endless Enigma" (Emerson; lyrics: Lake)
- "The Sheriff" (Emerson; lyrics: Lake)
- "Trilogy" (Emerson; lyrics: Lake)
- "Living Sin" (Emerson, Lake, Palmer)
- "Abaddon's Bolero" (Emerson)
- "Benny the Bouncer" (Emerson; lyrics: Lake)
- "Karn Evil 9 1st, 2nd, 3rd Impression" (Emerson; lyrics: Lake, Sinfield)
- "Piano Concerto n.1: Allegro Giojoso, Andante Molto Cantabile, Toccata con Fuoco" (Emerson)
- "L.A.Nights" (Emerson, Palmer)
- "Pirates" (Emerson; lyrics: Lake, Sinfield)
- "Tiger in a Spotlight" (Emerson, Lake, Palmer, Sinfield)
- "When The Apple Blossoms Bloom In The Windmills Of Your Mind I'll Be Your Valentine" (Emerson, Lake, Palmer)
- "Brain Salad Surgery" (Emerson, Lake, Sinfield)
- "Barrelhouse Shake-Down" (Emerson)
- "So Far To Fall" (Emerson; lyrics: Lake, Sinfield)
- "The Gambler" (Emerson, Lake, Sinfield)
- "Memoirs Of An Officer And A Gentleman: Prologue / The Education Of A Gentleman, Love At First Sight, Letters From The Front, Honourable Company (A March)" (Emerson; lyrics: Sinfield)
- "Introductory Fanfare" (Emerson)
- "The Score" (Emerson)
- "Learning To Fly" (Emerson; lyrics: Lake)
- "The Miracle" (Emerson; lyrics: Lake)
- "Touch And Go" (Emerson; lyrics: Lake)
- "Love Blind" (Emerson; lyrics: Lake)
- "Step Aside" (Emerson; lyrics: Lake)
- "Lay Down Your Guns" (Emerson; lyrics: Lake, Gould)
- "Vacant Possession" (Emerson; lyrics: Lake)
- "Lover to Lover" (Emerson, Berry, Palmer)
- "Desde la Vida" (Emerson, Berry, Palmer)
- "On My Way Home" (Emerson)
- "Black Moon" (Emerson, Lake, Palmer)
- "Paper Blood" (Emerson, Lake, Palmer)
- "Farewell To Arms" (Emerson; lyrics: Lake)
- "Changing States" (Emerson)
- "Close To Home" (Emerson)
- "Better Days" (Emerson; lyrics: Lake)
- "A Blade of Grass" (Emerson)
- "Hand of Truth" (Emerson; lyrics: Lake)
- "One By One" (Emerson, Lake, Olsen)
- "Thin Line" (Emerson, Wray, Olsen)
- "Change" (Emerson, Wray, Olsen)
- "Street War" (Emerson; lyrics: Lake)
- "A Cajun Alley" (Emerson)

=== Solo ===
- Inferno (soundtrack): 15 tracks (Emerson; lyrics on "Mater Tenebrarum": Emerson/Salmon)
- Nighthawks (soundtrack): 10 tracks (Emerson; lyrics on "Nighthawking": Mark Mueller)
- "Salt Cay" (Emerson)
- "Green Ice" (Emerson)
- "Rum-a-ting (Emerson)"
- "Jesus Loves Me (Emerson)"
- Harmagedon (soundtrack): 6 tracks (Emerson; lyrics on Children of the Light: Tony Allen)
- Murderock (soundtrack): 11 tracks (Emerson; lyrics on 3 tracks: Doreen Chanter)
- Best Revenge (soundtrack): 5 tracks and 1 orchestral suite
- "My Name is Rain" (Emerson; lyrics: Lorna Wright)
- "Snowman's Land" (Emerson)
- "Captain Starship Christmas" (Emerson; lyrics: Lorna Wright)
- "Up the Elephant and Round the Castle" (Emerson; lyrics: Jim Davidson)
- "Empire of Delight" (Emerson; lyrics: Peter Hammill)
- "Airport Of Silence" (Emerson, Tate; lyrics: Troy Tate)
- "Last Ride Into The Sun" (Emerson, Berry, Palmer)
- La Chiesa (soundtrack): 3 tracks (Emerson)
- "Shelter from the Rain" (Emerson, Bonilla, Gilbert)
- "Another Frontier" (Emerson)
- "Ballade" (Emerson)
- "The Band Keeps Playing" (Emerson, Bonilla, Gilbert)
- "Interlude" (Emerson)
- "Vagrant" (Emerson)
- "Solitudinous" (Emerson)
- "Broken Bough" (Emerson)
- "Outgoing Tide" (Emerson)
- "Roll'n Jelly" (Emerson)
- "B & W Blues" (Emerson)
- "For Kevin" (Emerson)
- "Hammer It Out" (Emerson)
- "Ballad For A Common Man" (Emerson)
- "Nilu's Dream" (Emerson)
- "Lament For Tony Stratton Smith" (Emerson)
- "And Then January" (Emerson)
- "Rio" (Emerson)
- "Soulscapes" (Emerson)
- "Asian Pear" (Emerson)
- "Motor Bikin'" (Emerson)
- "Katoh-San" (Emerson)
- "Star Strike Theme" (Emerson)
- Iron Man (soundtrack): 1 track and 5 suites (Emerson)
- Godzilla Final Wars (soundtrack): 13 tracks (Emerson)
- "Land of the Rising Sun" (Emerson)
- "New Orleans" (Emerson)
- "Middle of a Dream" (Emerson, Bonilla, Hughes)
- "The House Of Ocean Born Mary: Ignition, 1st Presence, Last Horizon, Crusaders Cross, Fugue, 2nd Presence, Blue Inferno, 3rd Presence, Prelude To A Hope" (Emerson; 3 tracks: Emerson, Bonilla)
- "The Art of Falling Down" (Emerson, Bonilla)
- "Gametime" (Emerson, Bonilla)
- "One By One" (Emerson, Berry)
- "What You're Dreaming Now" (Emerson, Berry)
- "Somebody's Watching" (Emerson, Berry)
- "Your Mark On The World" (Emerson, Berry)
- "Sailors Horn Pipe" (Emerson, Berry)
- "Never" (Emerson, Berry)
- "Beyond The Stars" (Emerson)
- "Glorietta Pass" (Emerson)
- "After All Of This" (Emerson)

== Literature ==
- Ford, Peter T. (1994). The compositional style of Keith Emerson in Tarkus (1971) for the rock music trio Emerson, Lake and Palmer. Terre Haute: Indiana State University. (Thesis M.A.)

== In popular culture ==
On the UK surreal television comedy series Big Train, Kevin Eldon portrayed Emerson as a Roman slave fighting his enemies with progressive rock.

The long-running comic-strip character Keef da Blade in the Gonville and Caius College, Cambridge student newspaper Lachesis (1970s) is based largely on Emerson, the character's name being presumably a reference to his trademark stage antics with knives.

== See also ==
- List of Hammond organ players
- List of Moog synthesiser players
