= Robert Berry =

American rock musician

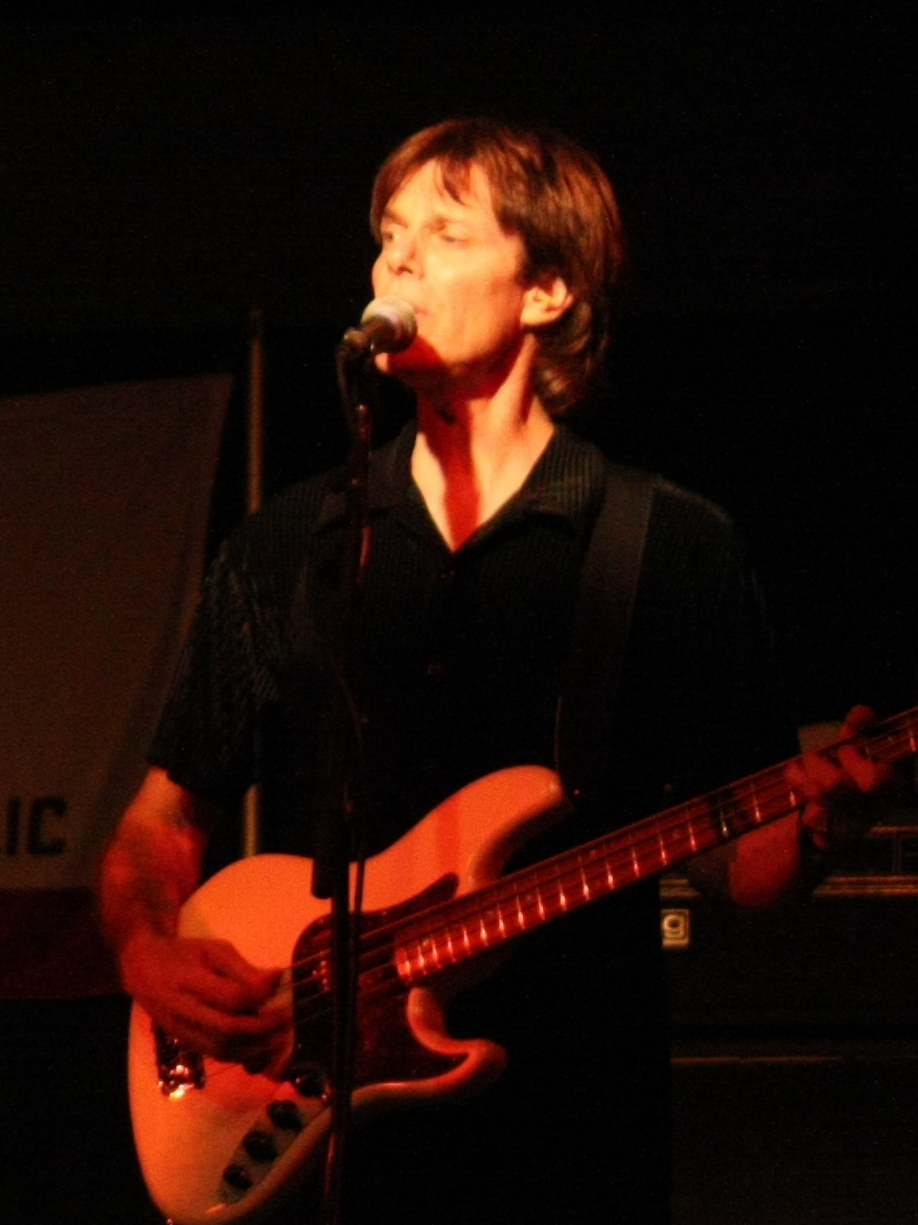
- Berry performing with The Greg Kihn Band in 2008

Background information
- Born: San Jose, California, U.S.
- Genres: Progressive rock; hard rock
- Occupations: Musician; singer-songwriter; record producer
- Instruments: Vocals; bass; guitar; keyboards
- Years active: 1975–present
- Label: Frontiers
- Member of: Sammy Hagar band; Six By Six
- Formerly of: Hush; 3; Ambrosia; Alliance; Los Tres Gusanos; The Greg Kihn Band
- Website: robertberry.com

Robert Berry is an American guitarist, bassist, vocalist and record producer, best known for his work with Hush, 3 with Keith Emerson and Carl Palmer, Ambrosia, Alliance, and Los Tres Gusanos. He was previously with The Greg Kihn Band, and as of 2022, he is with progressive band Six By Six on bass, vocals and keyboards, a supergroup with guitarist Ian Crichton (Saga) and drummer Nigel Glockler (Saxon, GTR).

== History ==
Berry came into the spotlight in 1988, when he teamed with Keith Emerson and Carl Palmer (of Emerson, Lake & Palmer fame) and formed the band 3. Their only album, To the Power of Three, drew much criticism from progressive rock fans for its radio-friendly and polished 1980s’ sound, considering the progressive pedigree of both Emerson and Palmer. 3 disbanded in 1989 after a successful tour supporting the album. The first single released from the album, Talkin' Bout, penned by Berry, reached No. 9 on the Billboard Mainstream Rock Tracks chart.

Since the dissolution of 3, Berry has participated in several projects, including Tales from Yesterday, a tribute album to Yes. He was also involved in a follow-up to GTR in which he replaced Steve Hackett. Material from this project and an unreleased second 3 album appeared on Berry's solo album Pilgrimage to a Point. Berry's current band Alliance is composed of Gary Pihl from the band Boston on guitar, David Lauser from the Sammy Hagar Band on drums and Alan Fitzgerald from Night Ranger on keyboards. Berry also has contributed songs to a number of film soundtracks, including the Anthony Michael Hall film Out of Bounds. In 1999, Berry produced and performed on The Wheel of Time, an album billed as a soundtrack to the Robert Jordan fantasy series The Wheel of Time. He is currently (as of 2021) the bassist for The Greg Kihn Band. He also works as a record producer.

In 2015, Berry and Emerson signed with Frontiers Music and began working on a follow-up to To the Power of Three as 3.2. The project was shelved following Emerson's death in March 2016, but Berry would finish the project himself and release it in 2018 under the 3.2 moniker as The Rules Have Changed.

Berry is in Six by Six, a power trio with Ian Crichton and Nigel Glockler.

== Discography ==
=== Solo albums ===
- Back to Back (1985)
- Pilgrimage to a Point (1992)
- In These Eyes (1994)
- Takin' it Back (1995)
- A Soundtrack for the Wheel of Time (1999)
- Prime Cuts (2006)
- The Dividing Line (2008)

=== Hush ===
- Hush (1978)
- 79 (1979)
- Hot Tonight (1982)
- Hush (1998)

=== 3 ===
- To the Power of Three (1988)
- Live Boston '88 (2015)
- Live – Rockin' The Ritz (2017)

=== December People ===
- Sounds like Christmas (2000)
- Rattle and Humbug (2001)
- DP3 (2005)
- Classic Rock Christmas (2009)
- St. Nicks Picks (2017)

=== Alliance ===
- Bond of Union (1996)
- Alliance (1997)
- Missing Piece (1999)
- Destination Known (2007)
- Road to Heaven (2009)
- Fire and Grace (2019)

=== All 41 ===
- The World's Best Hope (2017)

=== Greg Kihn Band ===
- Rekihndled

=== 3.2 ===
- The Rules Have Changed (2018)
- Third Impression (2021)

=== Six by Six ===
- Six by Six (2022)
- Beyond Shadowland (2024)
