= Hayden =

Hayden may refer to:

== Places ==
=== Inhabited places in the United States ===
- Hayden, Alabama
- Hayden, Arizona
- Hayden's Ferry, former name of Tempe, Arizona
- Hayden, California, former name of Hayden Hill, California
- Hayden, Colorado
- Hayden, Idaho
- Hayden Lake, Idaho
- Hayden, Indiana
- Hayden Island, Portland, Oregon, an island and neighborhood

=== Geographic features in the United States ===
- Hayden Butte or Tempe Butte, an andesite butte of volcanic origin in Tempe, Arizona
- Hayden Creek (disambiguation)
- Hayden Mountain (disambiguation)
- Hayden Peak (Utah), a mountain in Utah
- Hayden Valley, a large sub-alpine valley in Yellowstone National Park

=== Other places ===
- Hayden, Gloucestershire, a village in the United Kingdom
- Cortina d'Ampezzo, Veneto, a municipality in Italy formerly known in German as Hayden

== People and fictional characters ==
- Hayden (given name), including a list of people and fictional characters
- Hayden (surname), including a list of people and fictional characters
- Hayden (musician) (born 1971), a Canadian folk musician

== Other uses ==
- Hayden (electronics company), a British guitar amplification manufacturer
- Hayden Geological Survey of 1871, in northwestern Wyoming
- Hayden mango or Haden, a mango cultivar
- Hayden Planetarium, New York City, New York, United States

== See also ==
- Haden (disambiguation)
- Haydn (disambiguation)
- Haydon (disambiguation)
- Heyden (disambiguation)
- Heydon (disambiguation)
- Ayden, North Carolina
