= Haden =

Haden may refer to:

== Places ==
- Haden, Queensland, a town in the Toowoomba Region, Australia
- Haden, Idaho, United States
- Haden, Virginia, United States
- Haden Hill, West Midlands of England
  - Haden Hill House

== Other uses ==
- Haden (name)
- Haden (mango), a mango cultivar widely cultivated in the U.S. state of Florida
- Haden (motorcycle), a former motorcycle manufacturer based in the U.K.
- Haden (appliances), a manufacturer of electrical appliances and kitchen wares in the U.K.

== See also ==
- Baron Haden-Guest, British peerage
- Hayden (disambiguation)
- Haydon (disambiguation)
- Heyden (disambiguation)
- Heydon (disambiguation)
- Haydn (disambiguation)
