= Heyden =

Heyden may refer to:

== Places ==
Germany

- Heyden Power Station, nearby Petershagen in Germany

Canada

- Heyden, Ontario, a community of Awares, Ontario

== People ==
- Heyden family of Nuremberg, 16th and 17th century German family of musicians, musical instrument makers, and copper merchants
- Carl von Heyden (1793-1866), German senator and entomologist
- Doris Heyden (1905–2005), scholar of pre-Columbian Mesoamerican cultures
- Karl von der Heyden, Vice Chairman of the Board of Directors of PepsiCo, Inc.
- Lucas Friedrich Julius Dominikus von Heyden (1838-1915), German entomologist
- Philipp Heyden (born 1988), German basketball player
- Sebald Heyden (1499–1561), German musicologist, educator and hymn writer
- Stephan Van Der Heyden (born 1969), Belgian football coach and former football midfielder

== See also ==
- Felix von Heijden (1890-1982), Dutch footballer
- Van der Heijden, Dutch surname
- Van der Heyden, Dutch surname
- Heiden (disambiguation)
- Haiden (disambiguation)
- Haden (disambiguation)
- Hayden (disambiguation)
- Haydn (disambiguation)
- Haydon (disambiguation)
- Heydon (disambiguation)
