= Hayden (surname) =

The surname Hayden has several origins. In some cases it is a form of O'Hayden, which is derived from the Irish Ó hÉideáin and Ó hÉidín. These latter surnames mean "descendant of Éideán" and "descendant of Éidín", respectively; the Irish personal names Éideán and Éidín are likely derived from the Irish éideadh, which means "clothes", "armour".

In some cases the surname Hayden is derived from placenames in England that have various origins. For example, the placename Haydon occurs in Northumberland, and is derived from the Old English word elements heg ("hay") and denu ("valley"). Other places in Dorset, Hertfordshire, Somerset, and Wiltshire are derived from either the Old English word elements hēg ("hay") and dūn ("hill"), or from hege ("hedge") and dūn, or from (ge)hæg ("enclosure") and dūn.

In some cases the surname Hayden is a form of the Jewish surname Heiden.

== People ==
- Hayden family of Nuremberg, 16th and 17th century German family of musicians, musical instrument makers, and copper merchants
- Ada Hayden (1884–1950), American botanist
- Alyssa Hayden (born 1970), Australian politician
- Anthony Hayden (born 1961), judge of the High Court of England and Wales since 2013
- Barb Hayden, New Zealand marine biologist
- Basil Hayden (1899–2003), American college basketball player and coach
- Bea Hayden (born 1984) Taiwanese model and actress of American descent
- Benjamin Hayden (1822–1908), American lawyer and politician
- Bill Hayden (1933–2023), former Governor-General of Australia
- Brent Hayden (born 1983), Canadian swimmer
- Carl Hayden (1877–1972), United States Representative and Senator
- Carla Hayden (born 1952), American librarian, Librarian of Congress
- Charles Hayden (1870–1937), American financier and philanthropist
- Charles T. Hayden (1825–1900), American businessman and probate judge
- Dan Hayden (baseball) (born 1984), American college baseball coach
- Diana Hayden (born 1973), former Miss World and model from India
- Erika Check Hayden, American journalist
- Emily Spencer Hayden (1869–1949), 19th and 20th century American photographer
- Esther Hayden (1713–1758), American poet
- Ferdinand Vandeveer Hayden (1829–1887), 19th century American geologist
- Garey Hayden (1944–2015), American bridge player
- Gene Hayden (1935–2003), American professional baseball pitcher
- Gillette Hayden, pioneering dentist and periodontist in the early 20th century
- Harry Hayden (1882–1955), Canadian actor
- Henry Hubert Hayden, (1869–1923), Anglo-Irish geologist who worked in India and a mountaineer
- Horace H. Hayden (1769–1844), first licensed American dentist and dentistry school founder
- Isaac Hayden (born 1995), English footballer
- James Hayden (1953–1983), American actor
- Jane Hayden (born 1957), English actress
- Jeffrey Hayden (1926–2016), television director and producer
- Joel Hayden (1798–1873), 19th-century Massachusetts politician
- John Hayden (disambiguation), multiple people
- Josephine Hayden, Republican Sinn Féin politician
- Kelvin Hayden (born 1983), American football player
- Leo Hayden (born 1948), former National Football League running back
- Lewis Hayden (1811–1889), African American leader, ex-slave, abolitionist and businessman
- Linda Hayden (actress) (born 1953), English film and television actress
- Matthew Hayden (born 1971), Australian cricketer
- Martha Nessler Hayden (born 1936), American painter
- Melissa Hayden (actress) (born 1969), American actress
- Melissa Hayden (dancer) (1923–2006), Canadian ballerina
- Michael V. Hayden (born 1945), U.S. Air Force General and Director, Central Intelligence Agency
- Mike Hayden (born 1944), American politician
- Nicky Hayden (1981–2017), American motorcycle racer (brother of Roger Lee and Tomy Hayden)
- Palmer Hayden (1890–1973), American painter
- Pamela Hayden (born 1953), American voice actress
- Patrick Nielsen Hayden (born 1959), American science fiction editor
- Robert Hayden (1913–1980), African-American educator and poet
- Roger Hayden (born 1980), Australian rules footballer
- Roger Lee Hayden (born 1983), American motorcycle racer (brother of Nicky and Tommy Hayden)
- Salter Hayden (1896–1987), Canadian lawyer and senator
- Samuel Augustus Hayden (1839–1918), American Baptist pastor and newspaper publisher
- Samuel Hayden (1858–1934), Canadian politician
- Scott Hayden (1882–1915), African-American composer of ragtime music
- Sophia Hayden (1868–1953), American architect
- Sterling Hayden (1916–1986), American film actor
- Steve Hayden (1947–2025), American advertising executive and copywriter
- Teresa Nielsen Hayden (born 1956), American essayist and editor
- Tom Hayden (1939–2016), American civil rights activist and politician serving as a California state Representative and state Senator
- Tommy Hayden (born 1978), American motorcycle racer (brother of Nicky and Roger Lee Hayden)
- Torey Hayden (born 1951), American child psychologist
- Vanessa Hayden (basketball) (born 1982), American professional women's basketball player
- Will Hayden (born 1965), American criminal and former TV personality

== Fictional characters ==
- Christopher Hayden, in the television series Gilmore Girls
- Roger Hayden, the Psycho-Pirate, a DC Comics supervillain
- Dr. Samuel Hayden, a major character in the 2016 video game Doom, as well as a secondary protagonist of its 2020 sequel, Doom Eternal

== See also ==
- Hayden (given name)
- Haydn (name), given name and surname
