= Hiden =

Hiden is a surname. Notable people with the surname include:

- Markus Hiden, Austrian professional footballer
- Martin Hiden, Austrian professional footballer
- Philip W. Hiden, American businessman and mayor
- Rodolphe Hiden, Austrian professional footballer

== See also ==
- Haydn (disambiguation)
