= Haydn (disambiguation) =

Joseph Haydn (1732–1809) was an Austrian composer of the Classical period.

Haydn may also refer to:

- Haydn (name)
- Haydn (crater)

== See also ==
- The Haydn Quartet
- Hayden (disambiguation)
- Haiden (disambiguation)
- Heiden (disambiguation)
- Heyden (disambiguation)
