= Frank E. Baker Motorcycles Ltd =

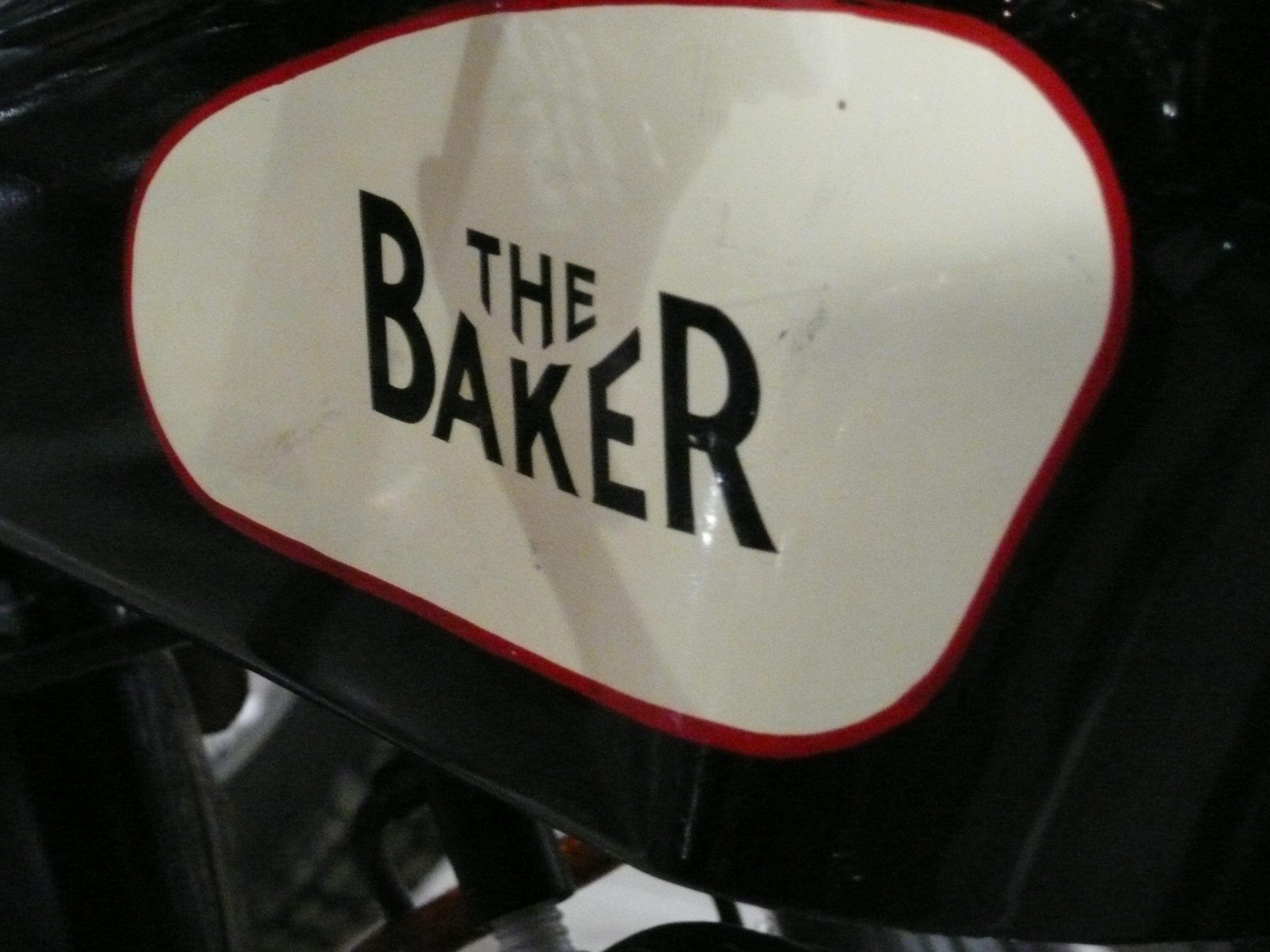
- Company type: Private
- Industry: Motorcycle
- Founded: 1927
- Founder: Frank Baker
- Defunct: 1930
- Successor: James Cycle Co
- Headquarters: Birmingham, United Kingdom
- Products: Motorcycles
- Owner: Frank Baker

Frank E. Baker Motorcycles Ltd was a British motorcycle manufacturer based in Alvechurch Road, Northfield, Birmingham, England. Founded in 1927 by Frank Baker, the company produced motorcycles under the Baker name until 1930 when it was sold to the James Cycle Co.

== History ==
The original Precision company was set up by Frank E. Baker in Birmingham. Frank Baker established a reputation for performance motorcycle engines and supplied Haden and Sun motorcycles. He began to build complete motorcycles using frames supplied by Sun, who were based at the nearby the Aston Brook Street factory. At the 1911 Olympia Motorcycle Show in London there were 96 motorcycles with Precision engines and by 1918, the company had over 800 employees. Tom Biggs was appointed as chief designer in 1913. Frank Baker stopped motorcycle & engine production during the First World War.

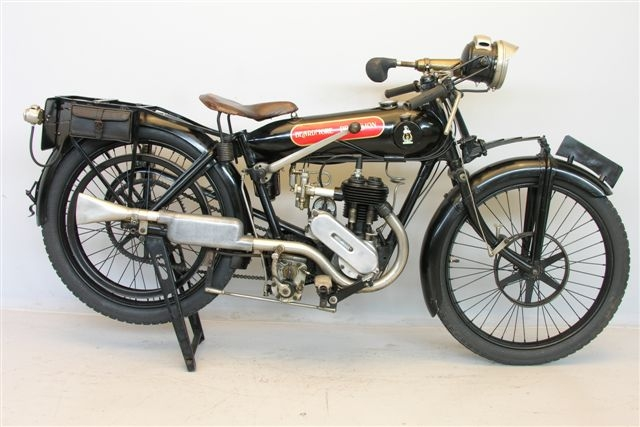
Beardmore Precision 350 cc 1923

In 1919 Baker's company was merged with William Beardmore and Company, a Scottish engineering and shipbuilding company based in Glasgow. Between 1921 and 1924 Beardmore produced motorcycles under the name "Beardmore Precision". The first motorcycle produced was a 350 cc two-stroke featuring leaf-spring suspension front and rear and was followed by a range of motorcycles from 250 cc to 600 cc.

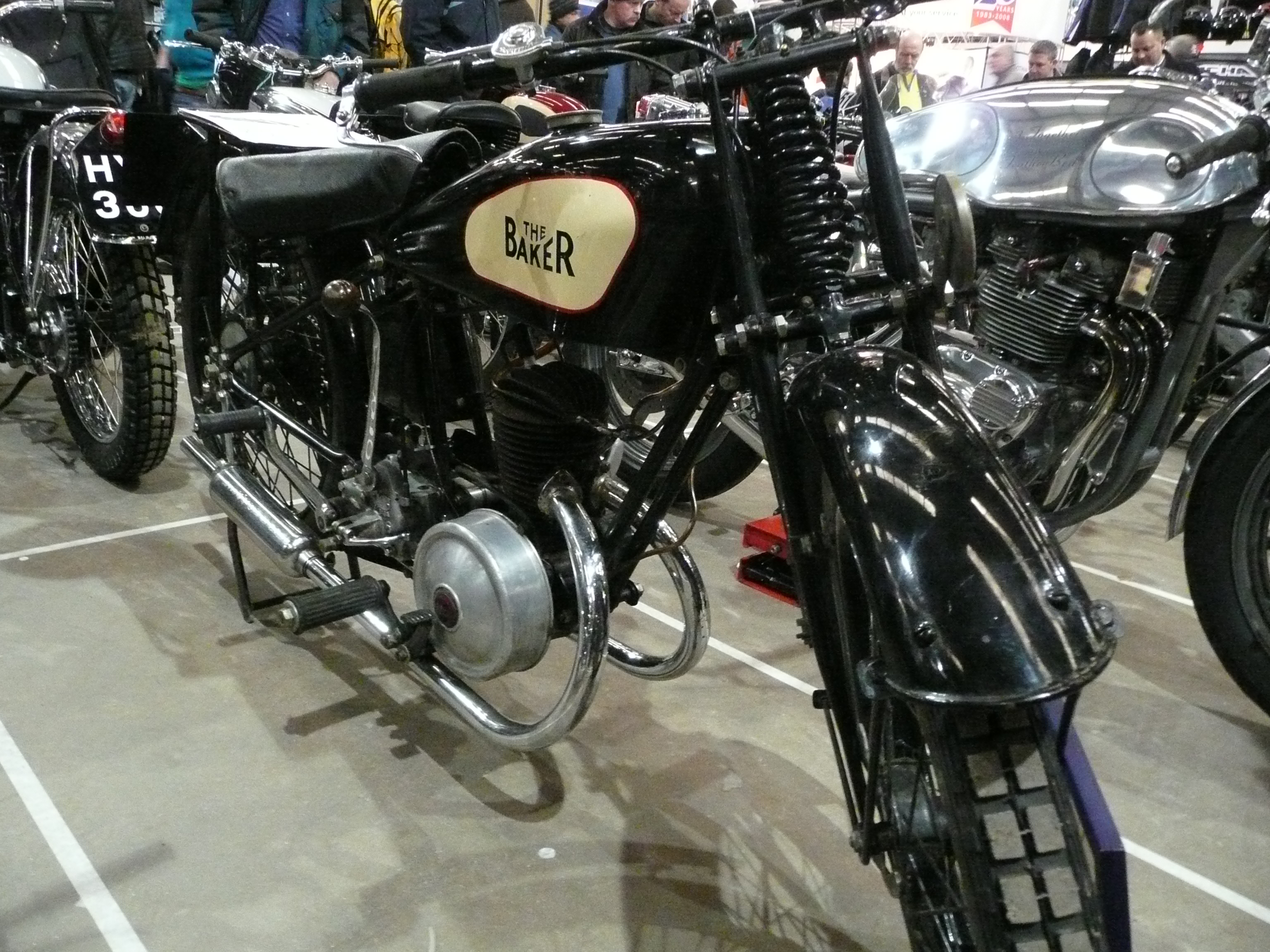
1927 Baker Supersport

When Beardmore stopped production of the Precision in 1924, Baker regained the rights and in 1927 he formed a new company, Frank E. Baker Motorcycles Ltd, and began making Villiers-engined motorcycles, which he produced under the Baker name until 1930, when he sold the business to the James Cycle Co who continued to produce James motorcycles at the Birmingham factory and used Baker's frame for some of their models.
