= Hayden Mountain =

Hayden Mountain of Hayden Peak may refer to the following peaks or locations.

== Antarctica ==
- Hayden Peak (Antarctica), a peak on Bear Peninsula, Marie Byrd Land

== United States ==
These features are generally named after Ferdinand Vandeveer Hayden, an American geologist noted for his pioneering surveying expeditions of the Rocky Mountains in the late 19th century.

Peaks

- Hayden Mountain (Oregon)
- Hayden Peak (Pitkin County, Colorado)
- Hayden Peak (San Miguel County, Colorado)
- Hayden Peak (Utah)

Other

- Hayden Mountain Summit, in Klamath County, Oregon
