= Hyden =

Hyden may refer to:

- Hyden (surname)
- Hyden, Kentucky, USA
- Hyden, Western Australia
