= Heiden =

Heiden may refer to:

== Municipalities ==
- Heiden, Germany
- Heiden, Switzerland

== Railway stations ==
- Heiden railway station, a railway station in Heiden, Switzerland

== People ==
- Heiden (surname)

== Other uses ==
- Heiden (Shinto), the offertory hall of a Shinto shrine
- Heiden Park, an urban park in Sydney, Australia

== See also ==
- Heyden (disambiguation)
- Haiden (disambiguation)
- Hayden (disambiguation)
- Haydn (disambiguation)
- Port Heiden, Alaska
- Heide (disambiguation)
