= Hayden Creek =

Hayden Creek may refer to:

- Hayden Creek (Lemhi River tributary), Idaho, United States
- Hayden Creek (Minnesota), United States
- Hayden Creek (Missouri), United States
- Hayden Creek (New York), United States
