= Pifco =

British electrical products brand

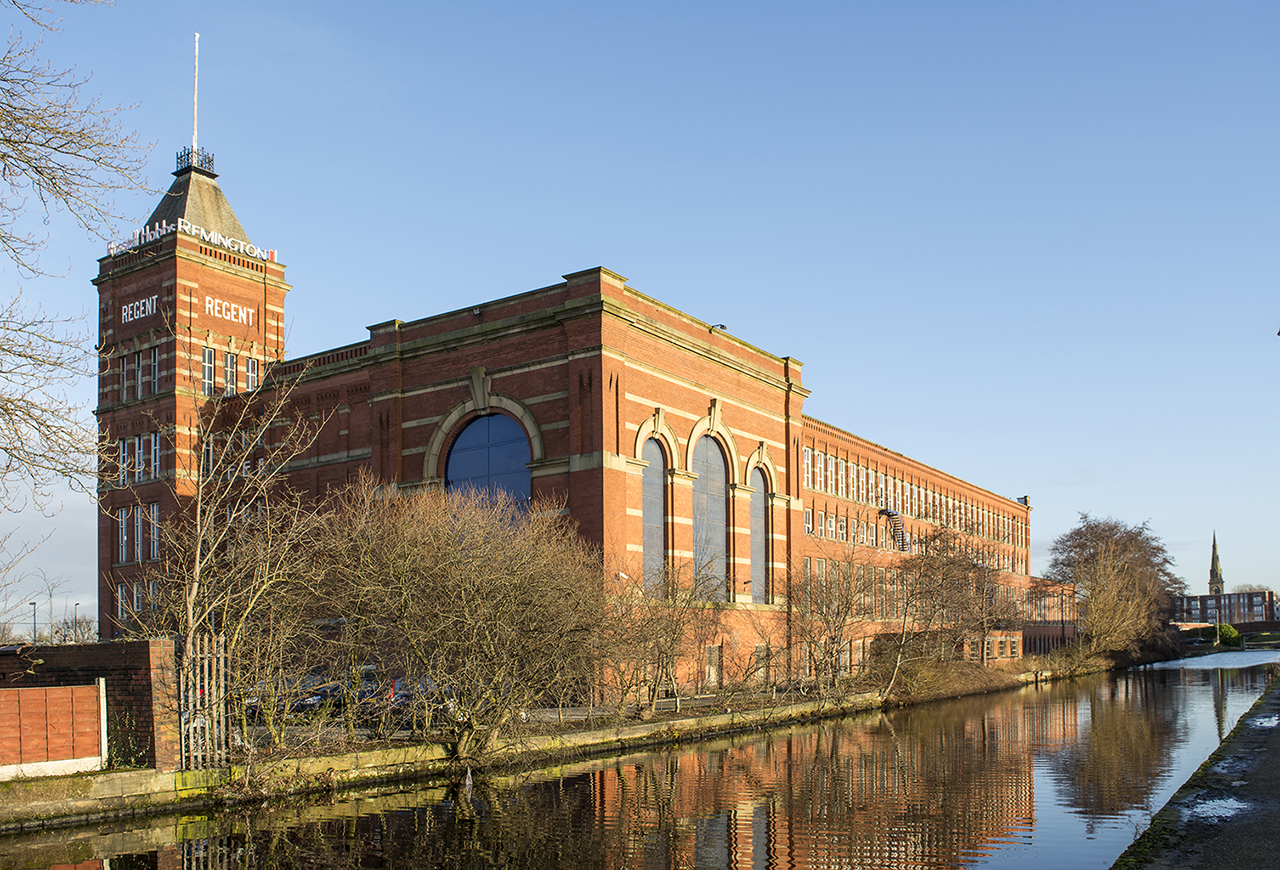
- Regent Mill in Failsworth, Pifco headquarters in the 1970s
- Type: Subsidiary
- Industry: Home appliances
- Predecessor: Provincial Incandescent Fittings
- Founded: 1900; 126 years ago
- Founder: Joseph Webber
- Headquarters: Failsworth, United Kingdom
- Products: Small domestic appliances
- Owner: For9Parigliders
- Website: pifco.com

Pifco (sometimes rendered PIFCO) is a British electrical goods brand and a former manufacturer of small domestic appliances.

The company had a long history of acquisitions and was itself ultimately acquired in 2001 by US company Salton Group. The company came to an end in 2007, but the brand continued to be used and since 2021 has been owned by Sabichi, which has revived the brand.

== History ==
=== Founding and growth ===
The company was established as the Provincial Incandescent Fittings Co. in 1900 by Joseph Webber, who opened a single lock-up shop in Failsworth, Oldham, Greater Manchester. Formed as a limited company in 1902, the company initially sold gas lighting appliances and accessories such as burners and mantles.

After World War I the company diversified into various electrical items. Christmas lights were an early addition to the product range, as were torches and battery lanterns. Hair dryers, shavers, fans and electric blankets soon followed. The company officially adopted the shortened name of 'Pifco' in November 1949.

Expansion in the following years included new factories in Salford, Manchester and Birmingham, as well as the 1957 incorporation of Birmingham-based Wall's Ltd, a manufacturer of small cooking appliances, kettles and medical lamps.

Other notable product lines added include bicycle lighting and hooters, heating appliances and cooking equipment from boiling rings to teasmades.

Pifco became a public company in 1957 and established a new headquarters at Failsworth in 1970. The company was family-controlled for 100 years, with Joseph Webber succeeded by his son Alfred in 1955 and his grandson Michael in 1983.

=== Acquisitions and diversification ===
By the early 1980s, Pifco was facing a general economic recession and increased competition from cheaper imported goods. The increasing negotiating power of major retail chains also led to pressure on margins and, in 1982, Pifco reported the first significant decline in its annual profits. In response, the company embarked on a strategy of acquisition to improve economies of scale and provide the broader product range being demanded by retailers.

In 1984, an initial attempt to acquire housewares company Swan failed, but was followed in 1985 by the £1.5 million purchase of the overseas business of US-based kitchen appliances company Salton, and by the takeover of heated hair roller company Carmen in 1987.

In 1991, Pifco purchased the well-known kitchen appliances and kitchenware manufacturer Russell Hobbs Tower, thereby doubling the size of the company and fulfilling Pifco's long-stated ambition to add domestic kettles to its product line. The subsequent development, under Pifco's ownership, of the new 'OPTEC' flat heating element technology by Russell Hobbs led to a significant rise in profits and attracted interest from other appliance manufacturers.

A failed attempt to purchase electrical hair styling and beauty brand BaByliss in 1995 was followed by a successful acquisition of air treatment and aromatheraphy company Mountain Breeze in 1996. Additionally, while numerous attempts to merge with rival kitchen appliance maker Kenwood failed, Pifco was successful during 2000 in purchasing Haden, another producer of small kitchen appliances.

=== Company takeover ===
In 2001 Salton Group, a US company, purchased Pifco and the registered company Pifco Ltd was renamed as Salton Europe Ltd. Salton already had established links with Pifco, following the sale of Salton's international division to Pifco in 1985.

The Pifco name continued to be used for some products such as torches, Christmas lighting, fans and travel appliances, but increasingly products were marketed either under the acquired Russell Hobbs and Carmen brands, or under brands owned by Salton such as George Foreman. By 2007, Salton Europe was focusing primarily on its Russell Hobbs brand with the Pifco brand licensed for use by other companies soon afterwards.

Salton renamed itself as Russell Hobbs, Inc in 2009, shortly before being acquired by Spectrum Brands in 2010. In the UK, Salton Europe Ltd followed suit by becoming Russell Hobbs Ltd, before later transferring business to Spectrum Brands (UK) Ltd and ceasing to actively trade itself.

The corporate entity that originated as Pifco Ltd technically remains in existence, but annual accounts filed in 2023 confirm that the company has been dormant since 2014.

=== Brand licensing, sale and reincarnation ===
Starting in 2007, Salton's focus on other brands led to the Pifco marque being licensed for use by other companies. Initially, a range of heating and cooling appliances, light bulbs, electrical accessories and LED Christmas lighting was produced by KB Group of Manchester. By 2016, the licence holder was RK Wholesale of Stoke-on-Trent, who sold a range of heating, cooling, floorcare and small kitchen appliances under the Pifco name, as well as a range of electrical accessories including plugs, sockets, adapters and extension leads.

Housewares company Sabichi purchased the Pifco brand outright in 2020, having previously also purchased and relaunched the sister Haden brand from Spectrum. A range of Pifco-branded goods is now produced by Sabichi, including:

- Hairdyers, brushes and straighteners
- Small kitchen appliances
- Vacuum cleaners and floor shampooers
- Electric blankets and weighted bedding
- Bathroom accessories
- Crockery and cutlery
- Non-electrical homewares

An extended range of batteries, bulbs and wiring accessories is also sold under license by the retailer Home Bargains.

== Product examples ==
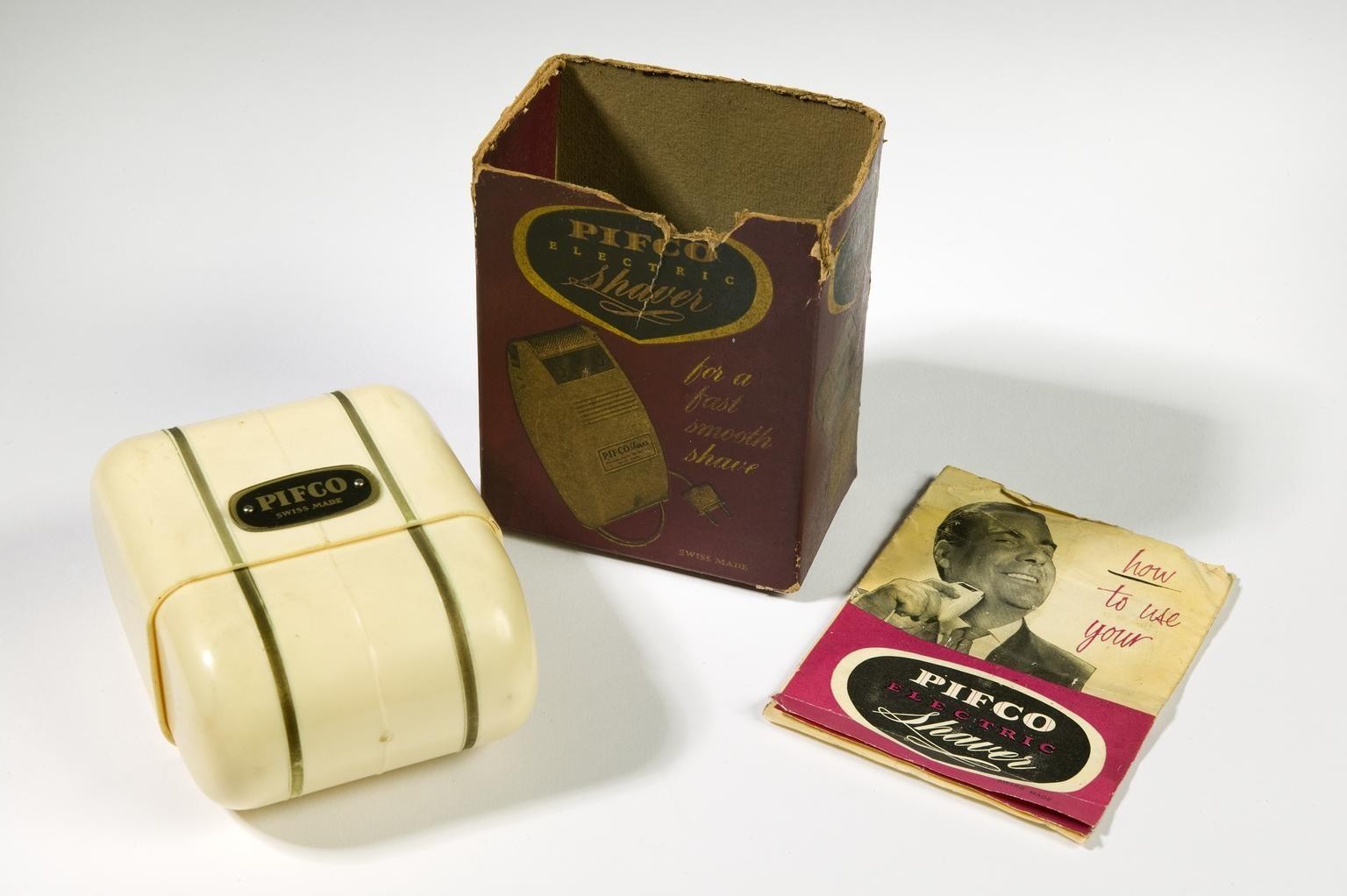
Electric shaver from the 1950s

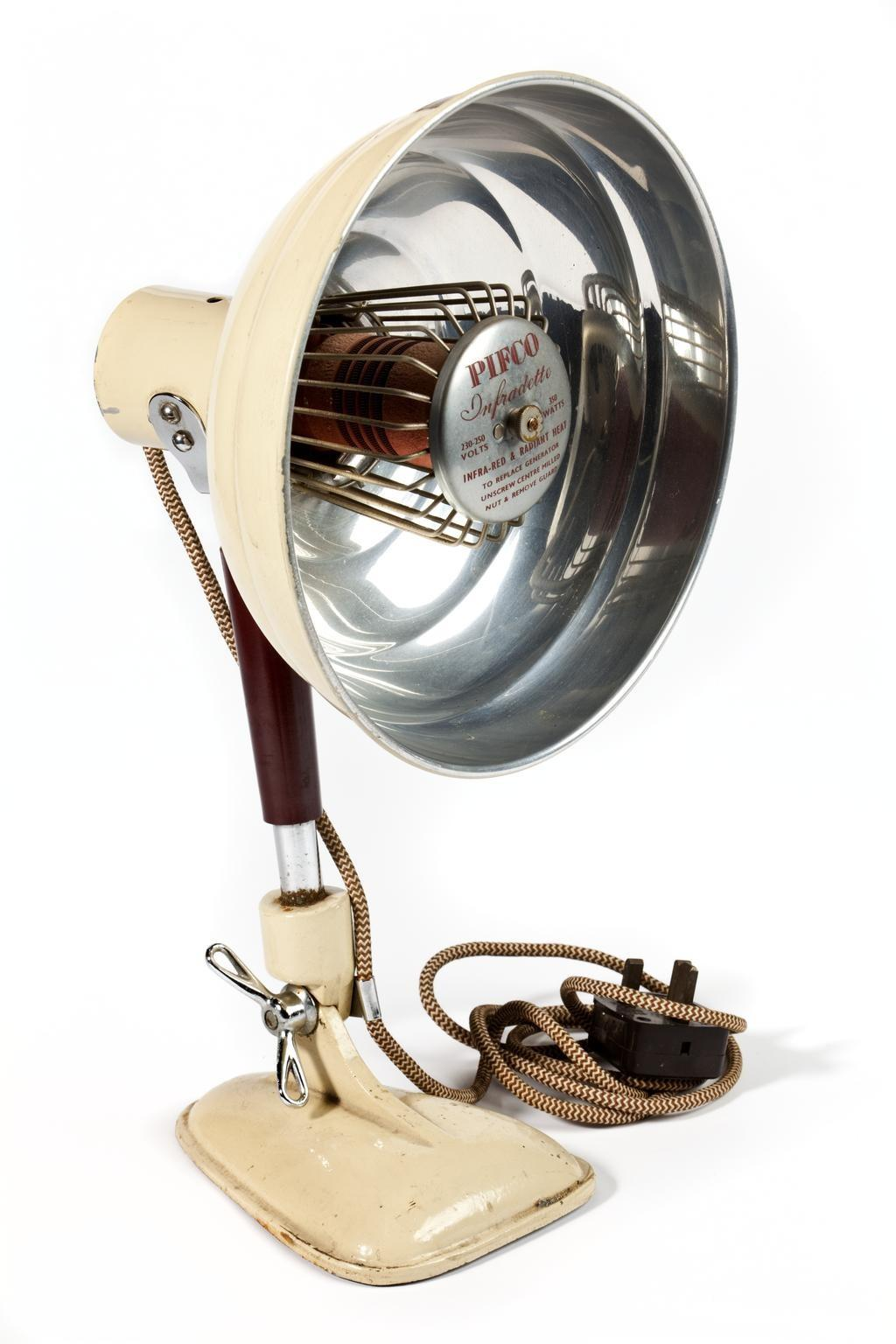
Typical 1950s Pifco heat therapy lamp

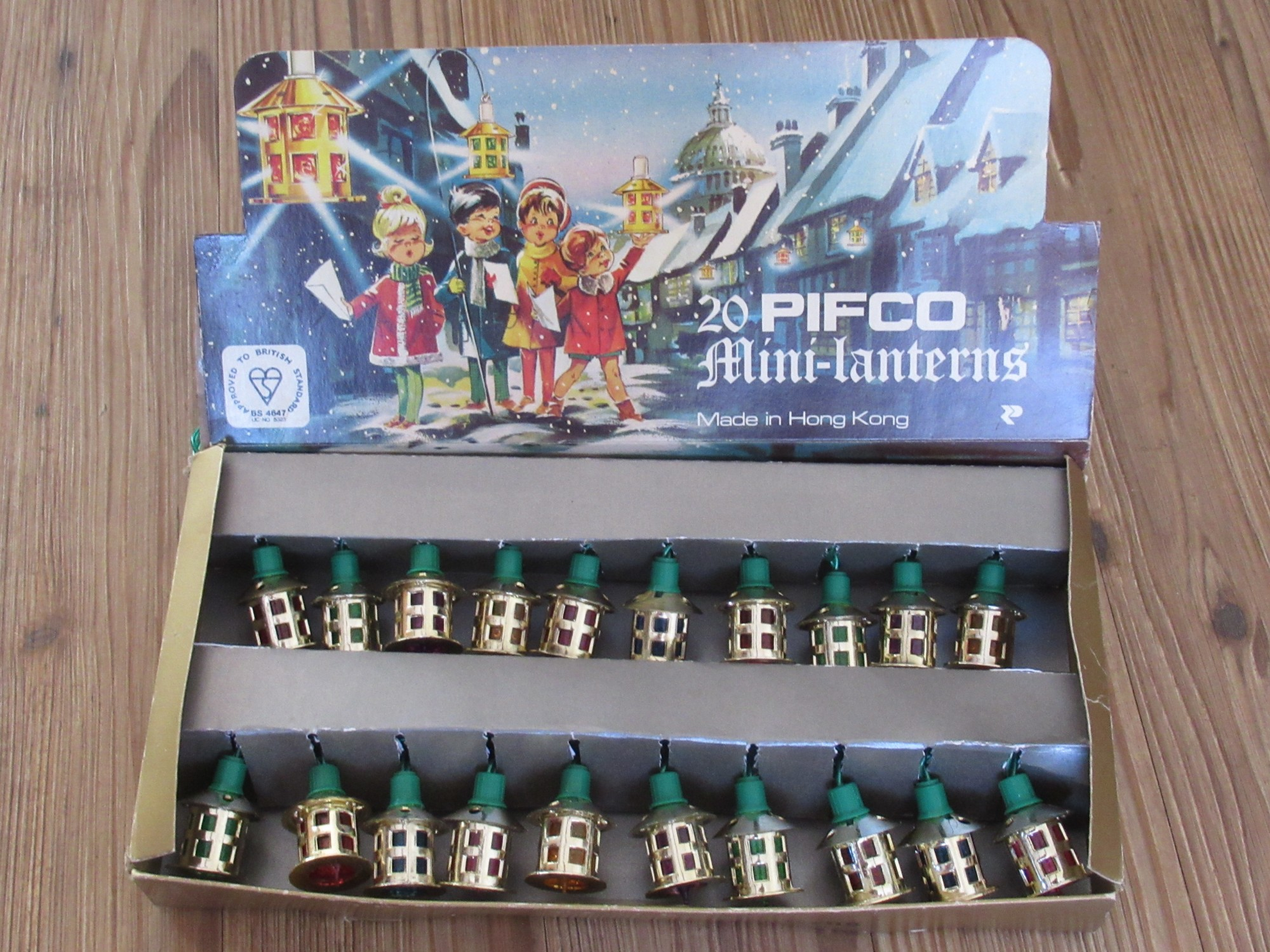
1970s set of 20 Christmas lanterns

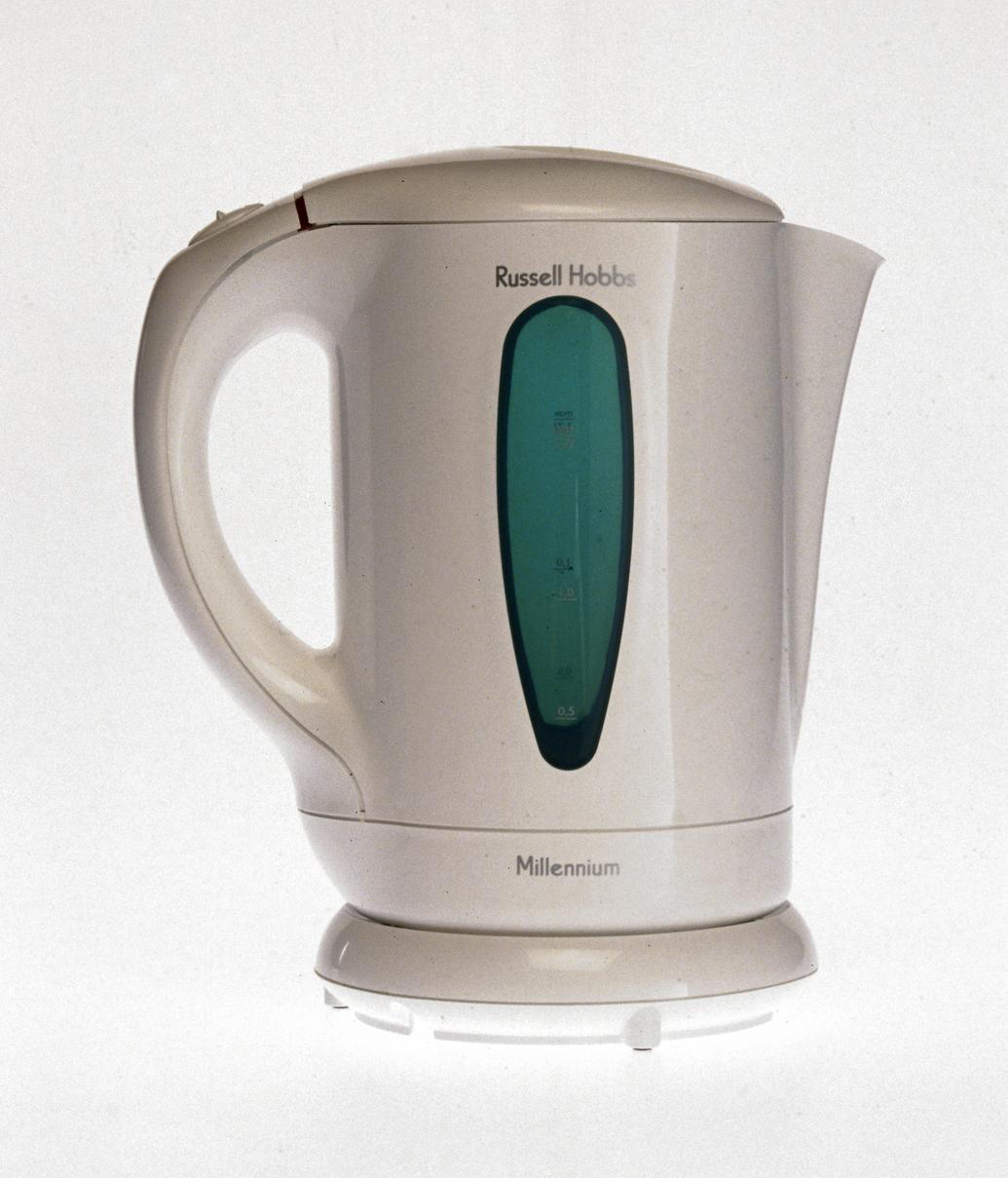
1996 'Millennium' kettle with 'OPTEC' flat element
