= Heydon =

Heydon may refer to:

== Places ==
- Heydon, Cambridgeshire
- Heydon, Norfolk
- Hedon (UK Parliament constituency), East Riding of Yorkshire, sometimes spelt Heydon

== Other uses ==
- Heydon (surname)
- Heydon Prowse (born 1981), British comedian

== See also ==
- Heydon Hall, Norfolk
- Heydon's Case (1584), a landmark case
- Haden (disambiguation)
- Haydon (disambiguation)
- Heyden (disambiguation)
