= Old Hill =

Village in Sandwell, England

Coordinates: 52.4740°N 2.0653°W

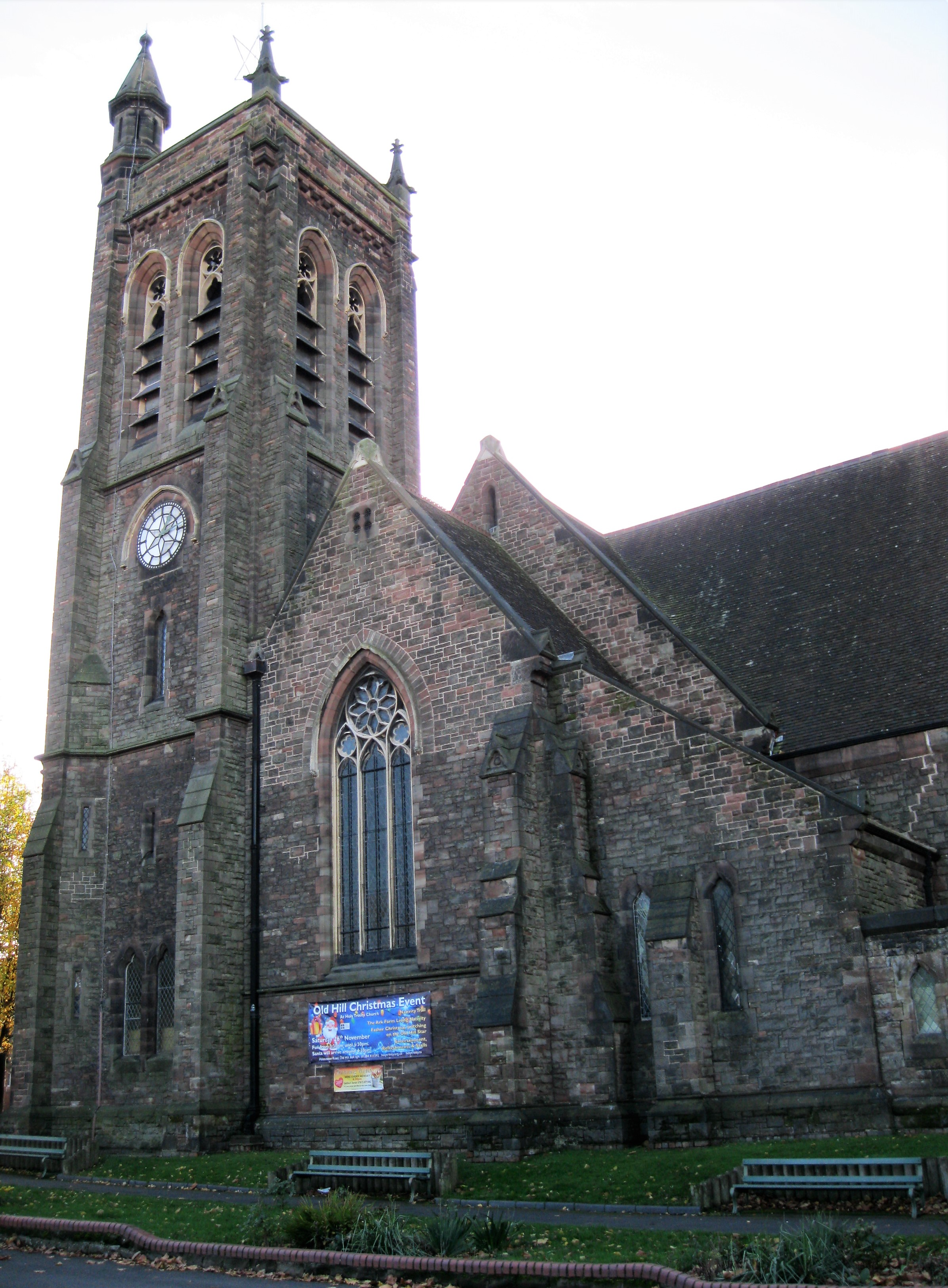
- Holy Trinity, Old Hill

- Location within the West Midlands
- OS grid reference: SO956862
- Metropolitan borough: Sandwell
- Metropolitan county: West Midlands
- Region: West Midlands
- Country: England
- Sovereign state: United Kingdom
- Post town: CRADLEY HEATH
- Postcode district: B64
- Dialling code: 01384
- Police: West Midlands
- Fire: West Midlands
- Ambulance: West Midlands
- UK Parliament: Halesowen

Old Hill is an urban village in the metropolitan borough of Sandwell, West Midlands, England, situated around 2 miles (3.2 km) north of Halesowen and 3 miles (4.8 km) south of Dudley. It is part of the Black Country and the West Midlands conurbation.

== History ==
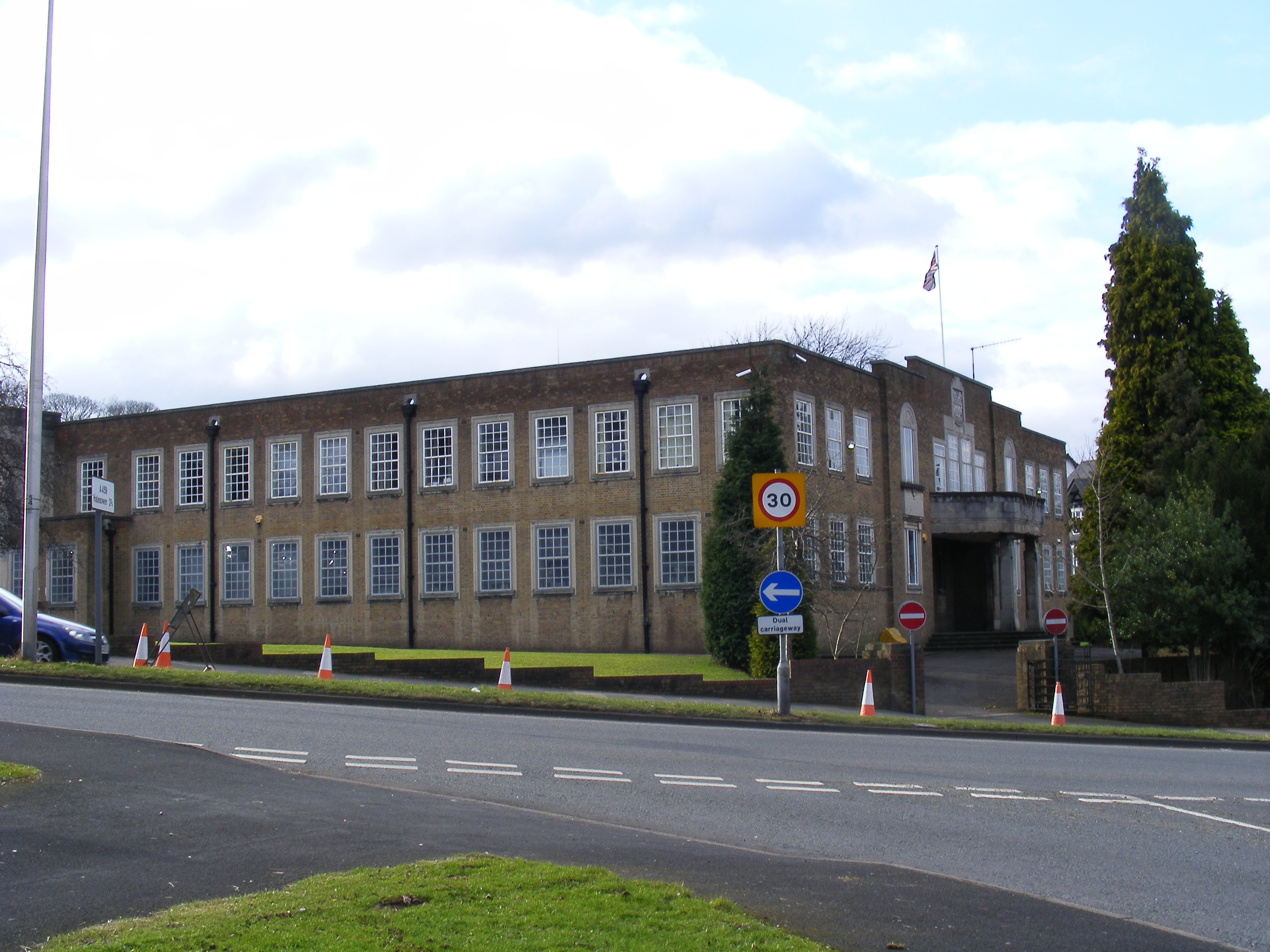
Former Rowley Regis Council House at junction of Barrs Road/Haden Hill Road - now demolished.

Originally a medieval hamlet, Old Hill is situated on an ancient 12th-century pilgrim track that ran from Halesowen Abbey to Dudley Priory. This route, mirrored by the modern A459, once marked the boundary between Abbey lands and Royal forest at Hayseech Common.

Old Hill was historically in the urban district and later county borough of Rowley Regis, in the county of Staffordshire. In the medieval era, the area was heavily wooded with beech, hornbeam, and oak, watered by the Mousesweet and Springfields brooks. The name Mousesweet is derived from "Mootsmeet," indicating a site where an Anglo-Saxon Moot, or local village parliament, met. Kelly's Directory of Staffordshire, 1896 has the name as Oldhill and states that it is an ecclesiastical parish formed on 26 August 1876 from the civil parish of Rowley Regis in the Kingswinford division of Staffordshire. however, local government reorganisation in 1966 saw it become part of the new County Borough of Warley, and transferred into the county of Worcestershire. This arrangement lasted until 1974, when it became part of the borough of Sandwell in the newly created West Midlands county. The town appeared on Plot’s 1686 map of Staffordshire, and 1821 enclosure maps show it was primarily an agricultural setting of 16 farms before industrialization took hold .

Along with neighbouring Cradley Heath, Old Hill was a centre of the chain-making industry from the mid-nineteenth century. Much production was by outworkers who set up chain-shops in buildings at the rear of their homes. This included the production of small chains and collars potentially exported for use in the slave trade, though the workers themselves lived in conditions often likened to slavery The Eliza Tinsley Company's business in Old Hill was in earlier days based on outworkers making nails and chains. In 1876, between 1,800 and 2,000 outworkers were used however as the company started to set up its own work-shops and move production in-house, numbers reduced. By 1934 there were 72 chain-works and chain-shops in Old Hill; almost a third of the total for Great Britain. Outworking declined after the Second World War and died out in the 1950s. Eliza Tinsley Group disposed of its Reddal Hill Road manufacturing and storage site in 2005.

The town is also a significant site in Trade Union history for the 1910 Women Chain Makers' Strike. Led by Mary Macarthur, hundreds of women struck for ten weeks to demand a minimum wage, a landmark dispute that successfully doubled the earnings for many workers in the "sweated trades.

Early industrial development also included the Old Lion Colliery, which utilized a Boulton & Watt steam engine as early as 1810. The New British Iron Company later became the area's most important industrial undertaking, operating mineral railways that crossed the town to connect with the Dudley Canal.

The current Trinity Centre shopping parade is built on the site of the original Trinity Hall. A newspaper report shows the hall to have opened by May 188) as an estimated 1,200 concertgoers attended a performance by the Old Hill Choral Society in January 1890. Besides concerts the hall was used for political rallies and lectures. A series of Gilchrist lectures held in autumn 1894 attracted some eminent speakers. Astronomer Sir Robert Ball presented the first, entitled "An Evening with the Telescope". Later speakers included geologist Charles Lapworth on "Our Midland Coalfields" and Wesleyan minister-cum-scientist Dr William Dallinger on "Spiders: Their work and their wisdom".

Old Hill's commercial centre was by-passed with the construction of a new single-carriageway road (Heathfield Way) which opened on 7 December 1990, relieving the centre of some of its heavy congestion. A rerouted section of Highgate Street, completed in 1988, formed the first phase of the by-pass.

== Sporting Facilities ==
Old Hill Cricket Club's ground is found next to Haden Hill Park.

Haden Hill Leisure Centre offered a range of sporting facilities including a gym, swimming pools and squash courts, but closed in 2024 after 50 years. In 2023, funding was announced to revamp the centre. As of 2025, there are plans to largely demolish and rebuild.

Old Hill Wanderers F.C. was an association football club active in the 1890s.

== Housing ==
In 1945 prefabs were built in Cherry Orchard and Spring Meadow to house young families. Although meant to be temporary they were much loved family homes for twenty years or more, until replaced by more modern housing.

The Riddins Mound council estate was built near the Halesowen Road railway overbridge in the 1960s. The estate provided 547 homes, 288 of which were in three 16-storey tower blocks, with the remainder spread across seven three-storey blocks of flats, nine maisonette blocks and four bungalows. The estate had fallen into decline by the early 1990s, and in August 1996 one of the tower blocks was demolished in a controlled explosion. The remaining properties have been refurbished and community facilities improved.

== Notable buildings ==
Haden Hill House, a Victorian gentleman's residence and Haden Old Hall are set in a municipal park to the south of the town centre. Haden Old Hall dates back to approximately 1531 and was saved from demolition in 1934 following a public appeal; Haden Hill House was built by George Alfred Haden Haden-Best, a local benefactor who modernised the building with underfloor heating and piped water. Both are in the ownership of Sandwell Borough Council and are open to the public. Nearby is the historic Corngreaves Hall, a late 18th-century building associated with the Attwood family and the local iron industry, which has recently been refurbished into apartments.

The Church of the Holy Trinity and a former butcher's shop at 191 Halesowen Road are grade II listed. The latter's listing in 2005 concludes:

The front of the shop and the interior with its complete tilework and fittings together with the outhouses give a surprisingly complete impression of the functioning of a high street butcher's premises in late Victorian Britain. The shop is a rare survival of a late C19 butcher's shop with an elaborately tiled shop, original metalwork and associated outhouses. It is the sort of building which was once more common along British High Streets but is now rare, especially in this intact state.[. . .]

== Schools and education ==
Education in the area began with charitable foundations such as the Redall Hill School, founded in 1720 by the Rev. C. Stephenson and the McMillan’s Charity School built in 1790. The Trinity Schools on Halesowen Road were established in 1879 following the Elementary Education Act of 1870.

Ormiston Forge Academy, (formerly Heathfield Foundation Technology College, and previously Heathfield High School) was built during the 1970s on Wright's Lane and is the only secondary school in Old Hill and Cradley Heath. A new technology block and a sports hall had been added by 1988.

Old Hill has three primary schools:

- Old Hill Primary School and Nursery is next to Holy Trinity Church on Lawrence Lane/Halesowen Road.
- Redall Hill Primary School and Nursery on Mace Street/Trinity Street is housed in the buildings of the former Macefields Secondary School, which date from 1891.
- Temple Meadow Primary School and Nursery is on Wright's Lane and Clifton Street; two buildings have datestones of 1898.

== Transport ==
Old Hill is served by Old Hill railway station on the main line from Birmingham, Snow Hill to Stourbridge.

Buses run to Halesowen, Dudley, Walsall, West Bromwich, Birmingham and Merry Hill Shopping Centre.

A branch of the Dudley Canal passes to the east of the town.

Former

Trams ran from Old Hill to Blackheath along a single line track with passing place loops owned by Rowley Regis Urban District Council. Perry Park Road with its 100-foot incline and hairpin bend was laid specifically for the tramway to avoid the steeper gradient up Waterfall Lane. The service was operated by Dudley, Stourbridge and District Electric Traction Company and commenced on 19 November 1904. The service continued until 30 June 1927.

== Notable people ==
Old Hill is the birthplace of cricketer Eric Hollies and his father Billy Hollies, one of the last of the underarm bowlers in League cricket. Comedian/comic actress Josie Lawrence, star of Whose Line Is It Anyway? and EastEnders, who has also topped the bill in London's West End, was also born here.

== Places of worship ==
Holy Trinity Parish Church stands at the junction of Lawrence Lane and Halesowen Road (the main street). The Grade II listed church building was completed circa 1875 and is built of snecked rock-faced red sandstone. The church was founded by a group of worshippers who preferred a more Protestant liturgy and evangelical style of worship than the High Church form practiced at St Luke's, Cradley Heath.

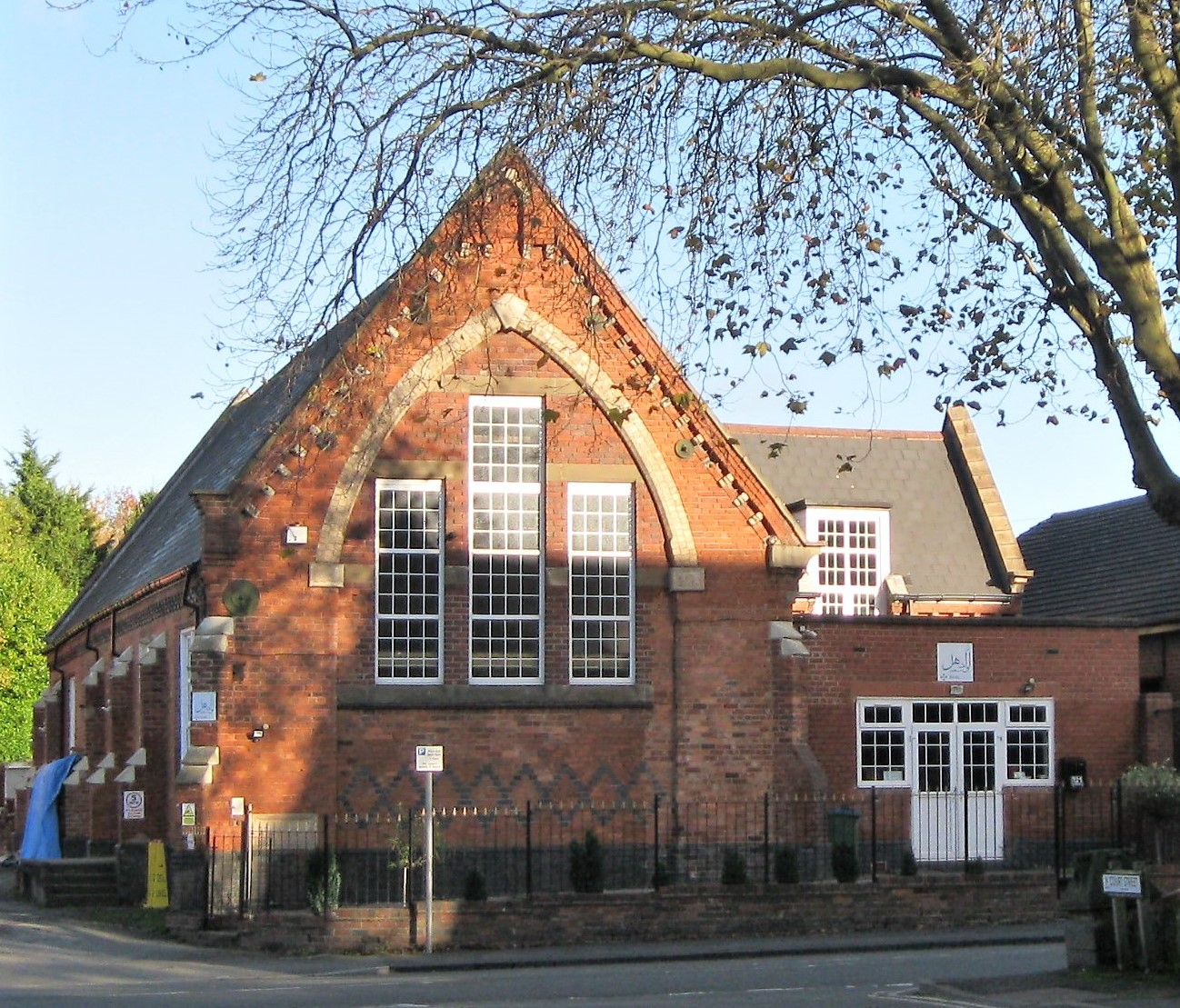
Old Hill Masjid

Almost opposite the parish church on Halesowen Road are the Kingdom Hall of Jehovah's Witnesses and the Old Hill Masjid, the latter occupying the former Zion's Hill Methodist Church Sunday School building.

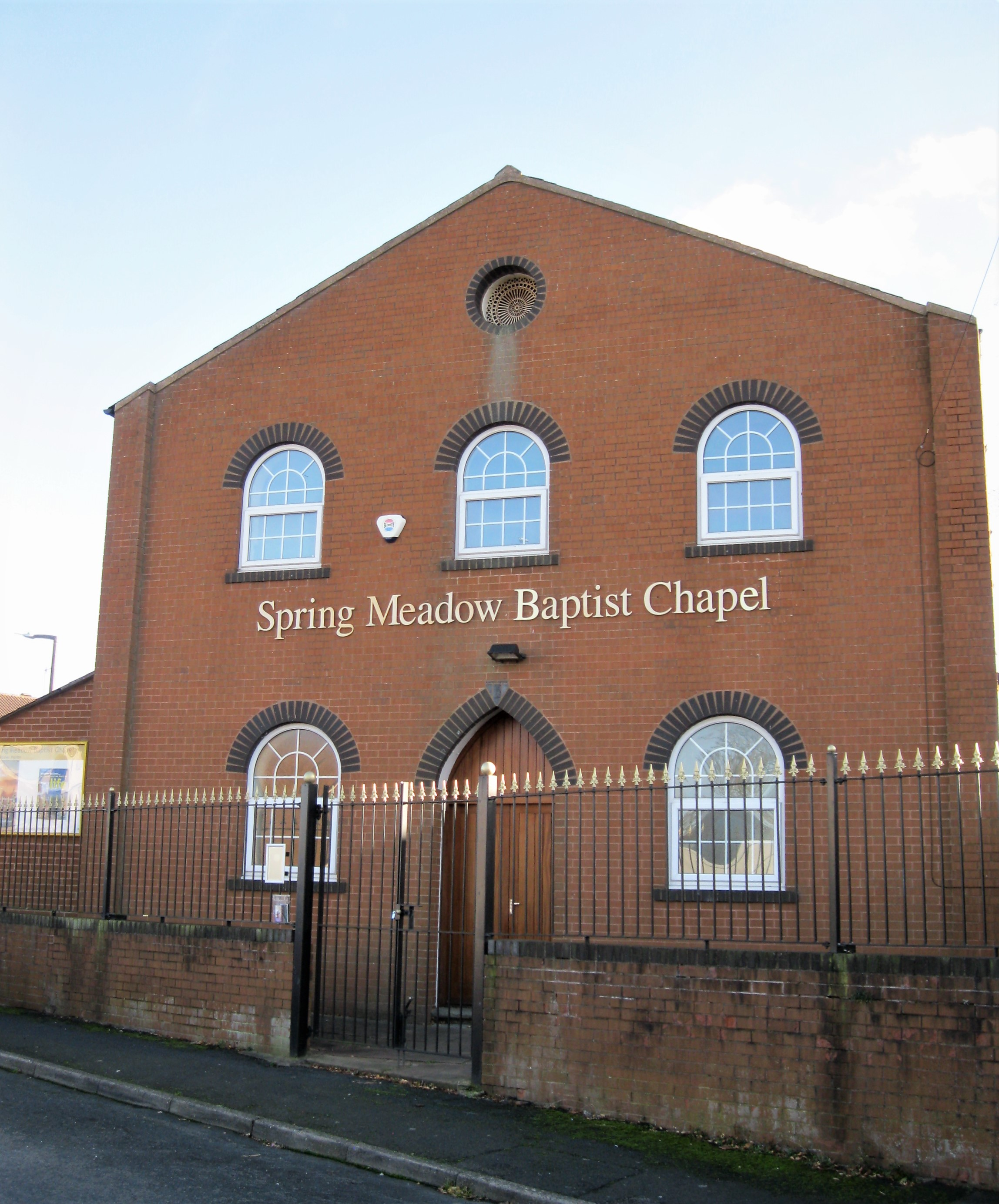
Spring Meadow Baptist Chapel

Our Lady of Lourdes Roman Catholic Church was founded in the 1920s in a disused button factory, utilised until a new church was built in the late 1970s. The new church was blessed by the Most Reverend Maurice Couve de Murville, Seventh Archbishop of Birmingham, on 13 October 1988 and was consecrated by the Right Reverend David McGough, Auxiliary Bishop of Birmingham, 1 November 2008.

The Methodists meet at a building on the corner of Lawrence Lane and Clyde Street, built after several other congregations amalgamated. St James Wesleyan Reform Union church is on Highgate Street.

Spring Meadow Baptist Church (or Chapel) was established in 1841, thus preceding Holy Trinity Parish Church, and greatly extended in 1864. A number of members and congregation from Spring Meadow left in 1902 to form the Ebenezer Strict Baptist Chapel, and opened a new church building on Station Road in 1904.

Former

The Macefield Mission building in Claremont Street has a datestone of 1904. The Mission had vacated the building prior to February 2022.
