= Hyden (surname) =

Hyden is a surname. Notable people with the surname include:

- John Hyden (born 1972), American volleyball player
- Steven Hyden (born 1977), American music critic

== See also ==
- Hayden (surname)
- Hyde (surname)
