= John Hayden =

John Hayden may refer to:

- Jack Hayden (baseball) (1880–1942), American baseball player
- Jack Hayden (politician) (born c. 1950), Canadian politician
- John Hayden (ice hockey) (born 1995), American ice hockey player
- John Hayden (Medal of Honor) (1863–1934), American sailor and Medal of Honor recipient
- John Louis Hayden (1866–1936), American brigadier general
- John Hayden (NASCAR) in 2006 NASCAR Busch Series
- John Michael Hayden (born 1984), American soccer player and coach
- John Patrick Hayden (1863–1954), Irish nationalist politician and MP
- John Hayden (bishop) (born 1940), British retired Anglican bishop
- Mike Hayden (John Michael Hayden, born 1944), American politician, Governor of Kansas
- John Hayden Jr. (born 1962), New Police Commissioner of the Metropolitan Police Department, City of St. Louis
- John Hayden (priest) (1794–1855), Anglican priest
