= Heiden (surname) =

Heiden is a surname. Notable people with the name include:

- Heiden family of Nuremberg, 16th and 17th century German family of musicians, musical instrument makers, and copper merchants
- Lodewijk van Heiden (1773), Russian admiral
  - Fyodor Logginovich van Heiden (1821), his son, military leader
- Anton Heiden (1960), former water polo player from The Netherlands
- Ava Heiden, American basketball player
- Bernhard Heiden (1910–2000), German-American composer and music teacher
- Beth Heiden (born 1959), American athlete
- Erhard Heiden (1901–1933), an early member of the Nazi Party and the third commander of the Schutzstaffel (SS)
- Eric Heiden (born 1958), American speed skater
- Frederick Heiden (1821–1900) governor general of Finland
- Konrad Heiden (1901–1966), journalist and historian of Nazi Germany
- Ira Heiden (born 1966), American television and film actor
- Siem Heiden (1905–1993), Dutch speed skater
- Sona Heiden, Indian film actress and model
- Steve Heiden (born 1976), American football player

== See also ==
- Heiden (disambiguation)
