= Ashdown Engineering =

British amplifier manufacturer

- Company type: Private
- Industry: Bass amplification
- Founded: 1997; 29 years ago
- Founder: Mark Gooday
- Headquarters: Heybridge, Essex, England
- Subsidiaries: Hayden Amplification
- Website: www.ashdownmusic.com

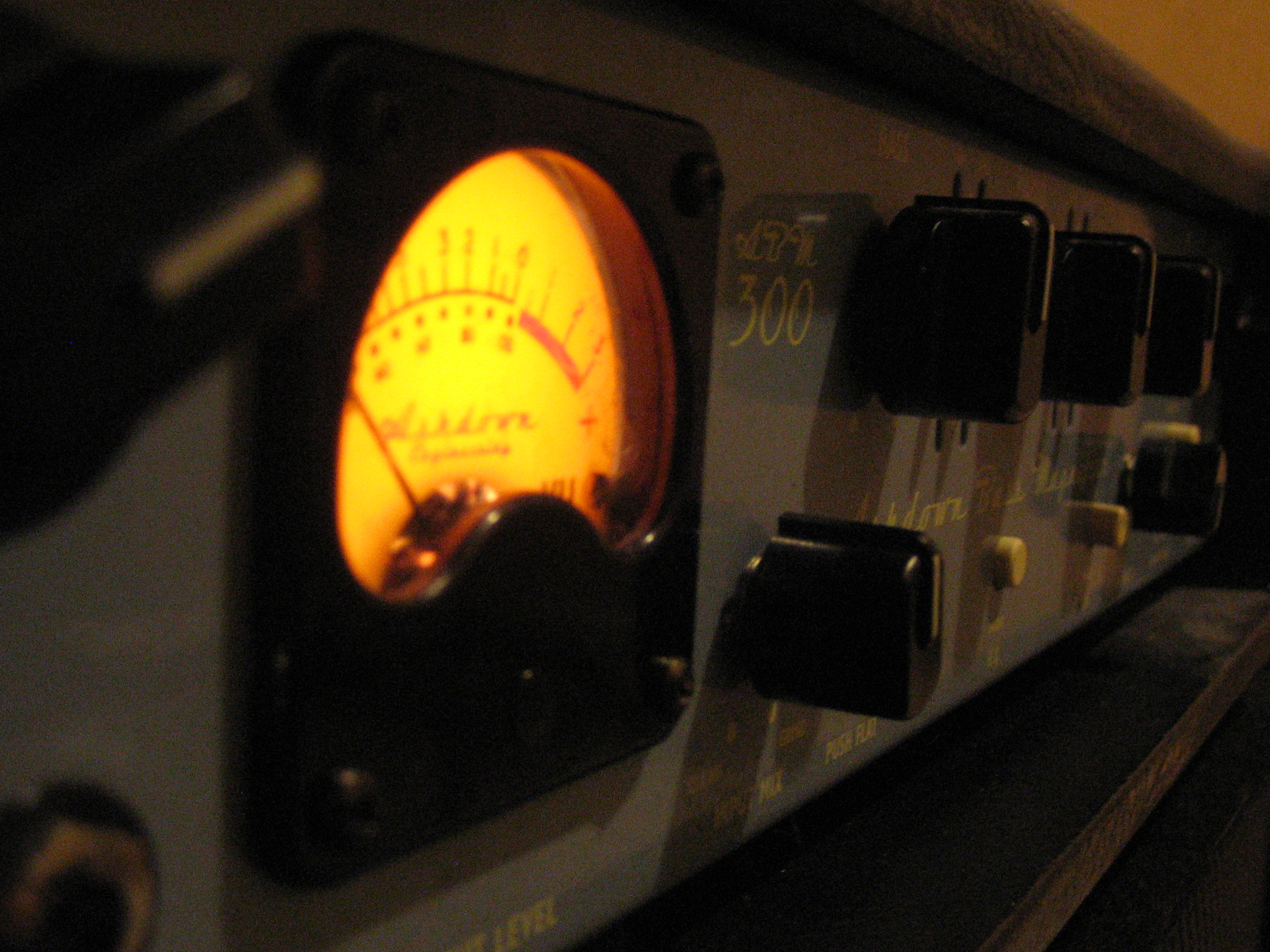
Ashdown ABM VU Meter

Ashdown Engineering is a British manufacturer of instrument amplifiers, particularly for bass and acoustic guitars.

== History ==
The company was founded in 1997 by Mark Gooday, a chief engineer and managing director at Trace Elliot. When Gooday was let go by Trace Elliot's then parent company, Kaman, and prior to Kaman closing the doors to the UK distribution and factory facilities, he had been planning to start his own company. The company was named 'Ashdown' after Gooday's wife's family name, and the logo was constructed from this, his passion for cars and the Austin-Healey motor badge.

Besides bass amplifiers and cabinets, the company makes effect pedals for bass players.

Initially focusing on bass guitarists, in 2001 the company introduced a line of guitar amplifiers (50W and 100W stacks and combos) called Peacemaker. Later, more affordable models in 20W and 40W were added, with cheaper PCB technology.

Ashdown have gone on to produce hand-wired amplifiers, and set up a separate company for this, called Hayden.
