= Haydon =

Haydon may refer to:

== Place names ==
- Haydon, Dorset, a village and civil parish in Dorset, England
- Haydon, Northumberland, a civil parish in Northumberland, England
- Haydon Bridge, a village in Northumberland, England
- Haydon, Somerset, a village in England
- Haydon Wick, Swindon, Wiltshire, England

== People with the given name ==
- Haydon L. Boatner (1900–1977), American army general
- Haydon Hare (1869–1944), English composer
- Haydon Kilmartin (born 1973), Australian rules footballer
- Haydon Manning, Australian political scientist
- Haydon Roberts (born 2002), English footballer
- Haydon Smith (1901–1948), English cricketer
- Haydon Spenceley (born 1984), English Christian musician
- Haydon Warren-Gash (born 1949), British diplomat

== People with the surname ==
- Benjamin Haydon (1786–1846), English painter and writer
- John A. Haydon (1830–1902), American civil engineer and civil war veteran
- Elizabeth Haydon, fantasy author
- Jimmy Haydon (1901–1969), English footballer
- Jodie Haydon (born 1979), Australian financial planner, women's advocate, and the partner of Prime Minister of Australia Anthony Albanese
- Glen Haydon (born 1965), American musicologist
- Mark Haydon, Australian thief and assistant murderer; one of the people in the Snowtown murders case

== Other uses ==
- Haydon, the mascot of the English football club AFC Wimbledon

== See also ==
- Haden (disambiguation)
- Hayden (disambiguation)
- Heyden (disambiguation)
- Heydon (disambiguation)
