= Hayden (given name) =

- Pronunciation: /ˈheɪdən/
- Gender: Unisex
- Language: English

Origin
- Language: English
- Meaning: hay valley

Other names
- Variant forms: Haydn, Haydon, Haeden, Heyden, Haiden, Haidyn
- Related names: Haydn (surname)
- See also: Hayden (surname)

Hayden is a given name in the English language. Its use as a first name comes from transferred use of the surname Hayden.

Hayden was generally considered a masculine given name up until the mid-20th century. The popularity of Hayden has been influenced by the popularity of similar-sounding names such as Aidan, Braden, Caden, and Jadon.

In the United States, the name became progressively less used for boys, dropping out of the top 1,000 names before 1950. In the 1980s, the name reappeared and was used for both boys and girls, with increasing popularity. Its popularity in the United States peaked at 2007 as the 71st most popular male name and in 2008 as the 127th most popular female name. It is now used in roughly equal numbers for American boys and girls. As a male name, Hayden also regained popularity in Australia in the 1980s and continues to feature in the top 100. In 2014, it came in at No. 66, up from No. 68 in 2013, but down from No. 52 in 2012 and No. 43 in 2011.

== People ==
- Hayden Alvarez (born 2007), Dominican baseball player
- Hayden Byerly (born 2000), American actor, Jude Jacob on The Fosters
- Hayden Silas Anhedönia (born 1998), American musician who performs under the stage name Ethel Cain
- Hayden Carruth (1921–2008), American poet and literary critic
- Hayden Chisholm (born 1975), New Zealand saxophonist, composer, and multi-instrumentalist
- Hayden Christensen (born 1981), Canadian actor, Anakin Skywalker in the Star Wars franchise
- Hayden Conner (born 2002), American football player
- Hayden Dalton (born 1996), American basketball player
- Hayden Desser, Canadian musician
- Hayden Epstein (born 1980), American football player
- Hayden Foxe (born 1977), Australian soccer player
- Hayden Fry (1929–2019), American football coach
- Hayden Griffin (1943–2013), British stage designer
- Hayden Hansen (born 2003), American football player
- Hayden Harris (born 1999), American baseball player
- Hayden Hatten (born 2000), American football player
- Hayden Herrera (born 1940), American author and historian
- Hayden Hurst (born 1993), American football player
- Hayden Kho (born 1980), Filipino cosmetic doctor
- Hayden Large (born 2002), American football player
- Haydn Linsley (born 1993), English/New Zealand singer-songwriter
- Hayden Mayeur (born 1997), Canadian speed skater
- Hayden Moore (born 1995), American football player
- Hayden Moss (born 1986), TV personality
- Hayden Mullins (born 1979), English football player
- Hayden Paddon (born 1987), New Zealand rally driver
- Hayden Panettiere (1989–2026), American actress
- Hayden Patriquin, American professional pickleball player
- Hayden Pedigo (born 1994), American avant-garde musician, politician, performance artist, and model.
- Hayden Roulston (born 1981), New Zealand cyclist
- Hayden Rucci (born 2001), American football player
- Hayden Senger (born 1997), American baseball player
- Hayden Thompson (1938–2025), American singer, songwriter and rockabilly musician
- Hayden Turner (born 1966), Australian zookeeper and television presenter
- Hayden White (1928–2018), American historian and academic
- Hayden White (footballer) (born 1995), English footballer

== Fictional characters ==
- Hayden, in the video game Fields of Mistria
- Hayden Fox, protagonist of the sitcom Coach, played by Craig T. Nelson
- Hayden Romero, in the television series Teen Wolf
- Hayden Pike, in the book series Game Changers and television show Heated Rivalry

== See also ==
- Hayden (surname)
- Haden (name)
- Haydn (name)
