= Haydn (crater) =

Crater on Mercury

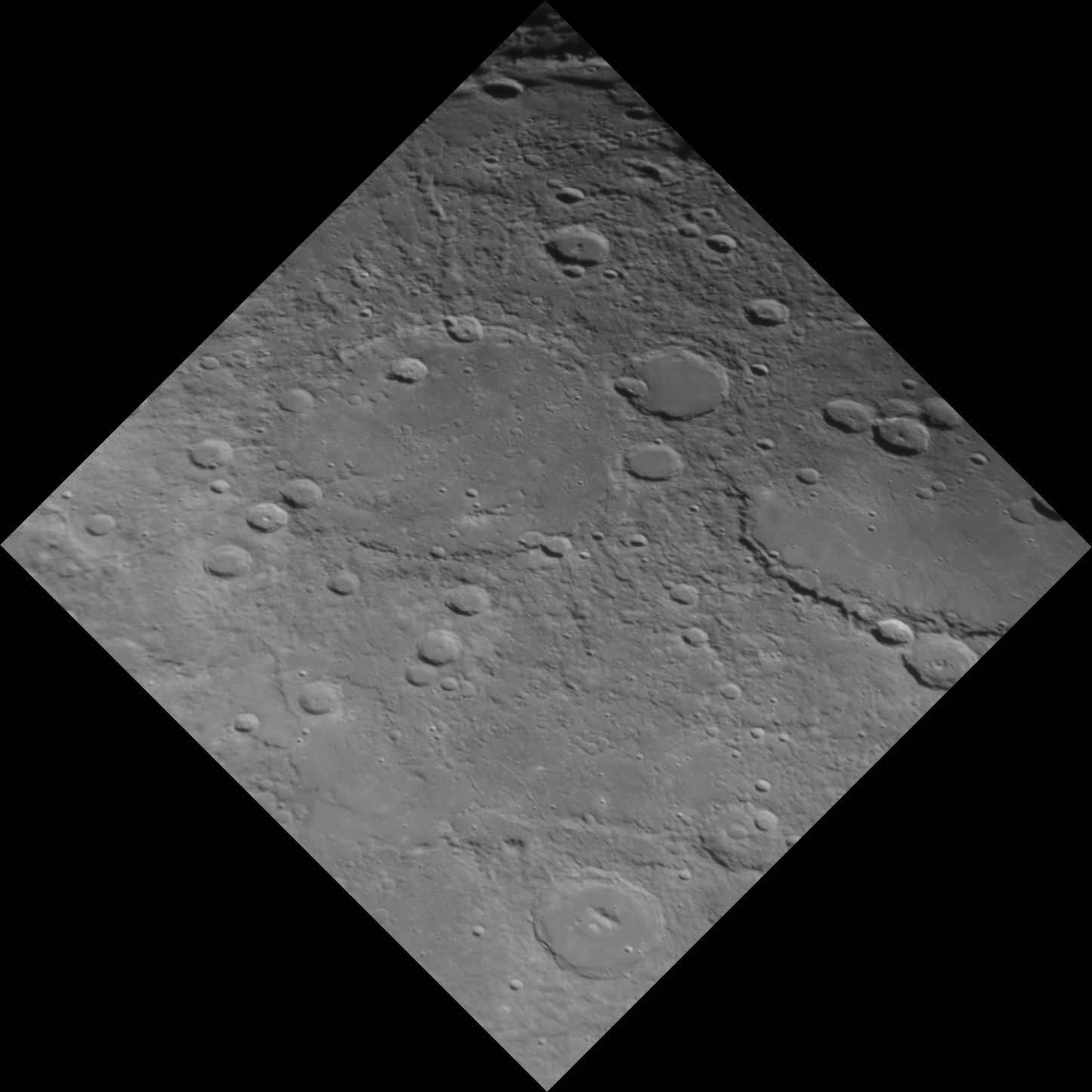
- MESSENGER image, from second flyby of Mercury in October 2008
- Feature type: Impact crater
- Location: Discovery quadrangle, Mercury
- Coordinates: 27.22°S 71.64°W
- Diameter: 251 km (156 mi)
- Eponym: Joseph Haydn

Haydn is a crater on Mercury. It has a diameter of 251 kilometers. Its name was adopted by the International Astronomical Union (IAU) in 1976. Haydn is named for the Austrian composer Joseph Haydn, who lived from 1732 to 1809.

Haydn is south of the larger basin Raphael.

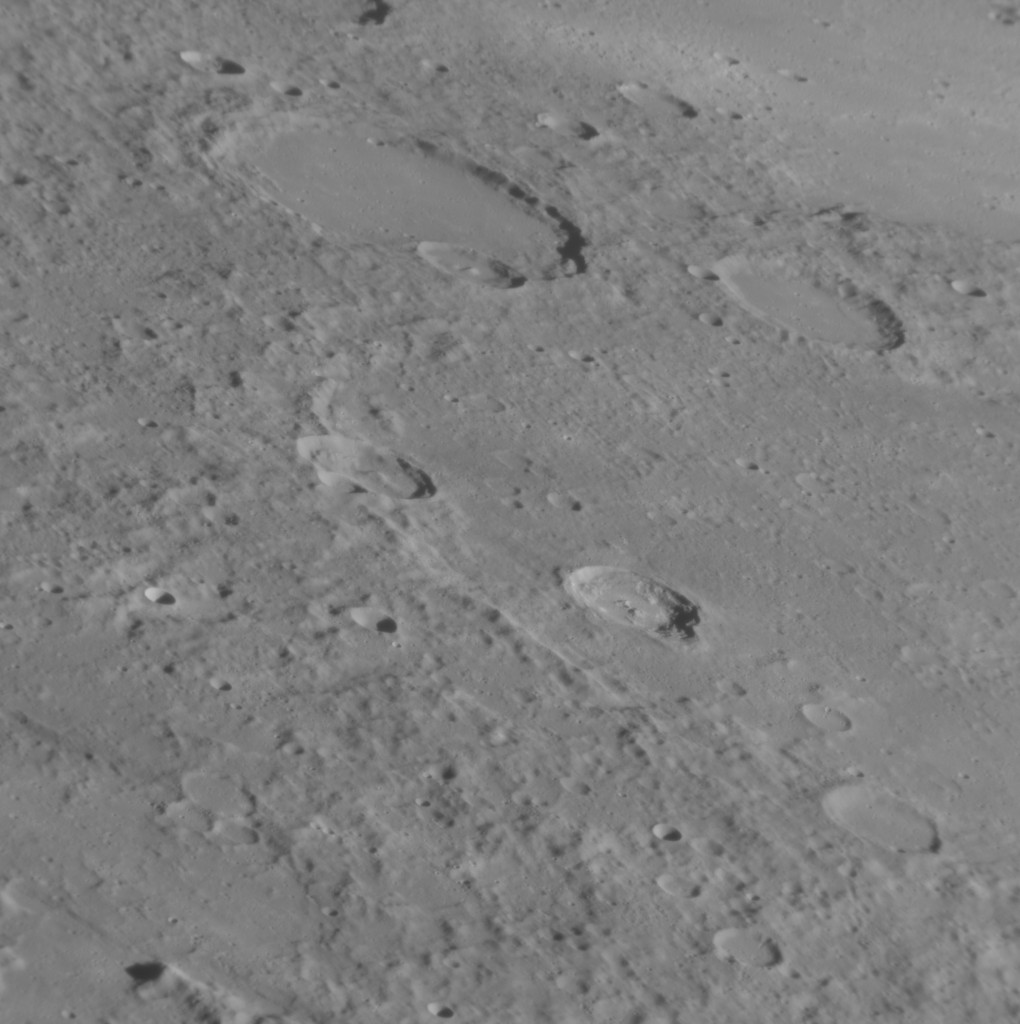
Another oblique view from MESSENGER with Haydn at right

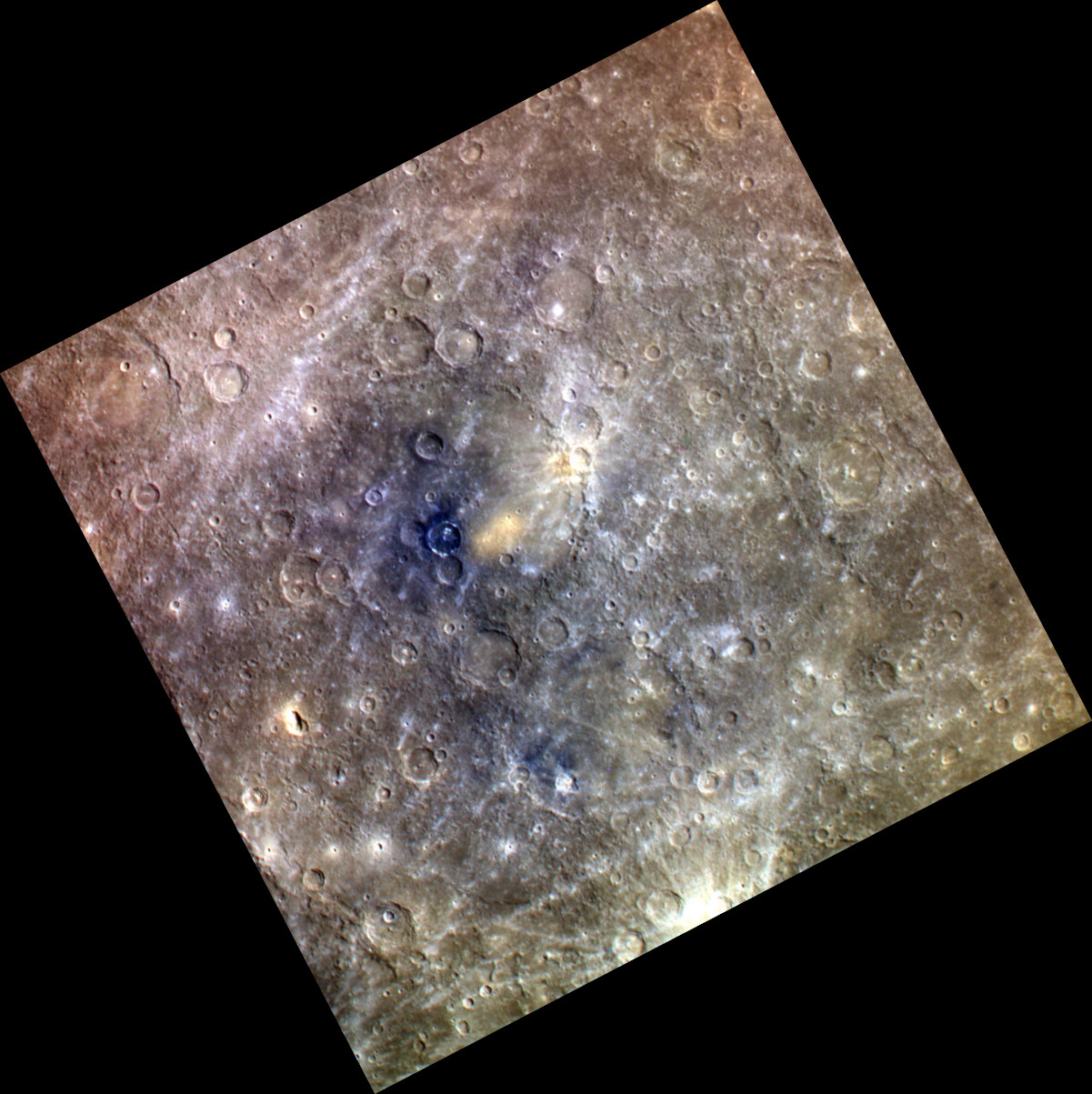
Raphael crater (top) and Haydn crater (bottom) in approximate color
