= Haiden =

Haiden may refer to:

- A Gewürztraminer wine
- Haiden (Shinto), the hall of worship of a Shinto shrine
- Haiden family of Nuremberg, 16th and 17th century German family of musicians, musical instrument makers, and copper merchants
- Christine Haiden, Austrian journalist and author

== See also ==
- Heiden (disambiguation)
