= Haydn (name) =

Haydn is both a surname and a given name. Notable people with the name include:

== Surname ==
- Joseph Haydn (1732–1809), Austrian composer of the Classical period
- Johann Evangelist Haydn (1743–1805), tenor singer and brother of Joseph Haydn
- Joseph Timothy Haydn (d. 1856), Irish author of Haydn's Dictionary of Dates and The Book of Dignities
- Lili Haydn (born 1969), American actress, singer, and violinist
- Michael Haydn (1737–1806), composer and the younger brother of Joseph Haydn

== Given name ==
- Haydn Bendall (born 1951), English record producer
- Haydn Bunton Sr. (1911–1955), Australian rules footballer
- Haydn Bunton Jr. (born 1937), Australian rules footballer
- Haydn Dimmock (1895–1955), British magazine editor
- Haydn Fleming (born 1978), English footballer
- Haydn Gwynne (1957–2023), British actress
- Haydn Hollis (born 1992), English footballer
- Haydn Linsley (born 1993), member of New Zealand boyband Titanium
- Haydn Robins (born 1972), Australian rules footballer
- Haydn Tanner (1917–2009), Welsh rugby union player who also played for the British and Irish Lions
- Haydn Wood (1882–1959), English composer and violinist

== See also ==
- Hayden (given name)
- Hayden (surname)
