= Hayden Mountain Summit =

Mountain pass in Oregon, United States

- Interactive map of Hayden Mountain Summit
- Elevation: 4,705 ft (1,434 m)
- Traversed by: OR 66

Third Approach
- Location: Klamath County, Oregon, United States
- Range: Siskiyou Mountains
- Coordinates: 42.117087°N 122.110014°W
- Topo map: Chicken Hills

Hayden Mountain Summit (el. 4705 ft.) is a mountain pass in the U.S. state of Oregon traversed by Oregon Route 66.

== See also ==
- Applegate Trail
- Hayden Mountain (Oregon)
