= Erika Check Hayden =

American science journalist

Erika Check Hayden is an American science journalist and the director of the Science Communication Program (SciCom), a graduate program which was created in 1981 at the University of California, Santa Cruz. She is based in San Francisco, California.

== Biography ==
Check Hayden received her bachelor's degree in biology from Stanford University, where she wrote for both the Stanford Daily and the Stanford Alumni magazine.

Check Hayden previously wrote for the news section of the peer-reviewed journal Nature from 2001 to 2016. She initially worked for Nature out of Washington, D.C. until 2006, when she began working for them out of San Francisco, California. She first became an instructor for the SciCom program in 2010. She covered the 2014 Western African Ebola epidemic for Nature and Wired, with funding from a fellowship from the Pulitzer Center for Crisis Reporting. Her coverage focused on aspects of the ebola outbreak that had generally been ignored by the mainstream media, such as the outbreak's effects on maternal health. She was later recognized with three awards from the Association of Health Care Journalists for this reporting.
