= Haden Hill Park =

Stately home in West Midlands, England

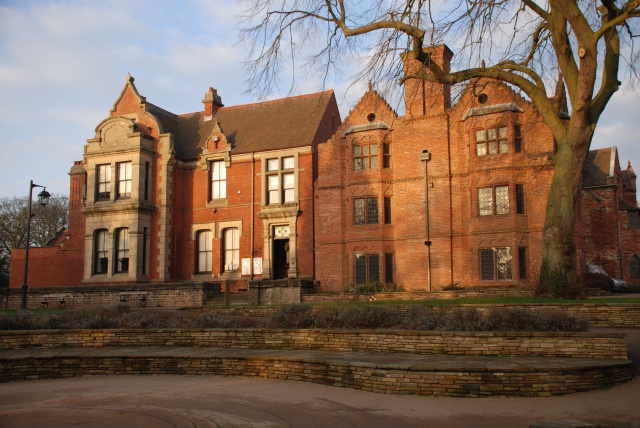
- Haden Hill House and Hall, at the North of the park
- Interactive map of Haden Hill Park
- Type: Public park
- Location: Sandwell, West Midlands
- Coordinates: 52°27′59″N 2°03′43″W
- Created: 1922
- Operator: Sandwell Metropolitan Borough Council
- Open: all year
- Website: www.sandwell.gov.uk/hadenhillpark

Haden Hill Park is at Haden Hill, between Halesowen and Old Hill in the West Midlands, England, on the southern edge of the Black Country. Within its grounds are the sixteenth and seventeenth century Haden Hall (also known as Haden Hill Old Hall), the Victorian Haden Hill House and Corngreaves Nature Reserve. The park and buildings are owned and managed by Sandwell Metropolitan Borough Council.

The estate, of which the Park was a central part, was built up by the Haden family over many hundreds of years. In 1877 it passed to George Alfred Haden Haden-Best (1839–1921) who built Haden Hill House and developed the parkland. It was bought by Rowley Regis Urban District Council following a public subscription in 1922 and became a public facility.

A major restoration programme over the period 2000–2007 was largely funded by the National Lottery. The Park has been given a Green Flag Award every year since 2004 and also has been a Green Heritage Site winner. Sandwell Council lists Haden Hill Park as one of the borough's nine "flagship parks".

== History ==
=== Before 1877: early history ===
The Haden family had occupied the site of the present park possibly as far back as the thirteenth century. The family had been farmers and had prospered in the seventeenth and eighteenth centuries by stint of advantageous marriage and investment in adjacent land. The main family house was the building now known as Haden Hall, essentially a large farmhouse that had been extended and rebuilt over time but mostly is believed to date from the seventeenth century.

The first Haden to be styled 'gentleman' was Henry Haden (1633–1675) who was succeeded by his son Thomas (1684–1756) and then by Thomas's son John (1723–1796). John married late in life to a young woman, Mary Kendrick, leaving one child, Anna Eliza. John expressing a wish that his young wife should remarry on his death and this she did, to the Reverend George Barrs, an Evangelical Protestant clergyman. As Anna Eliza (1790–1876) was herself to die childless shortly after inheriting, under the terms of John Haden's will, the estate passed to Eliza's half-brother, Alfred Barrs (1804–1877), son of Reverend George and Mary Barrs. When Alfred died childless the estate passed to his nephew, George Alfred Haden Best (1839–1921), the son of Alfred's sister. One of the conditions of inheritance was that Best should incorporate the name Haden into his surname, notwithstanding it already was one of his given names.

=== 1877–1921: the time of George Alfred Haden Haden-Best ===
Haden-Best (1839–1921)

George Alfred Haden Haden-Best was born at nearby Corngreaves Hall in 1839. Corngreaves Hall was a grand property dating from the late eighteenth century and owned by the New British Iron Company who used it to house the managers of their nearby factory, one of whom was Haden-Best's father, Benjamin Best. He had married Emiline Barrs, but both had died relatively young, many years before Haden-Best came into his inheritance.

Haden-Best soon settled on a scheme of transforming the estate surrounding Haden Hall from being a farm to becoming a house in an imitation of the grand style. A small cottage next to Haden Hall where Haden-Best had been living was demolished and a large Victorian house was built in its place. This new building included modern conveniences such as underfloor heating, piped water, a bathroom, flush toilets and a gas supply. The Hall was retained as it was the home of Mary Barrs, second wife of Fredrick Barrs, eldest son of the Reverend George Barrs (1802–1875). It is probable that Mary Barrs confined herself to a part of the Hall and the remainder was left semi-derelict, almost certainly with the intention of demolishing the entire structure on her death and extending the new house. In the event, she lived to 1904 and this never happened.

In addition to the building of the new house, the grounds were landscaped, mimicking the style of the great parks of the aristocracy. Lakes were built at the top and bottom of the park and attractive walks and gardens created. The park was designed to emphasise the views south to the Clent Hills while obscuring the less scenic aspect to the north where the industrial landscape of the Black Country dominated.

Haden-Best sometimes granted public access to the park. At the end of May 1882, the park was opened to the public on four consecutive days. Visitors could enjoy boating on the lake and a wander round the heated glass houses. In July 1884, there is a notice in a local newspaper for an annual floral and horticultural exhibition complete with musical entertainment and refreshments.

Haden-Best was a prominent figure in the local community, funding education and teaching in the local Sunday School. He never married but did adopt two local girls, Emily Bryant and Alice Cockin. They were the children of local families, and he took them into his home and bought them up as his own. They were given an upper class lifestyle, and Emily remained with Mr Best until his death in 1921. Alice married John Shaw, a local doctor, and they lived in Haden Hall for a while after the death of Mary Barrs.

When Haden-Best died in 1921, the estate passed to his nephews, the children of his sister Emiline (1836–1892) who had married an Italian Evangelical Protestant businessman called Walter Bassano (died 1903). Like Haden-Best, Bassano was a benefactor of the local community, and was largely responsible for financing the building of Holy Trinity Church, Old Hill in the 1870s. Bassano sons, Haden-Best's nephews, Alfred and Charles disposed of much of the estate, meaning that George Haden-Best was to be the only owner-occupier Haden Hill House ever had, as well as being the only person to carry the Haden-Best surname.

=== 1922 to date: public ownership ===
The estate was put up for public sale by the Bassano brothers. Following a public subscription, Haden Hill House, Haden Hall and parkland were bought for £8,500 for the use of the local community. The title deeds were handed to Rowley Regis Urban District Council on 14 October 1922, and the park was opened one week later. The council later bought a further 16 acres (6.5 ha) of adjacent land to incorporate into the park, making a total area of 52 acres (21 ha). The additional land was Temple Meadow to the east and the nine acre field to the south west.

By 1935, the Hall was in such a poor state of repair that the council proposed its demolition. However, a mix of private and public funding financed a restoration programme that was completed in October 1937. The Hall was used as a tea room and also hosted wedding receptions. During World War II, part of the Hall was used as a refuge for evacuees.

In the years following World War II, maintenance of the Park ceased to be a civic priority and, in 1971, Haden Hill House was in a poor state of repair and Haden Hall had returned to a state of dereliction and was again threatened with demolition. The Haden Hill Preservation Society was launched to focus opposition to the threat. In September 1977 a major fire left the Hall on the verge of collapse. Sandwell Council were unable to finance repairs, but were also reluctant to demolish the Hall owing to its historic significance. Extensive restoration to the Victorian house was carried out over a number of years and the building was opened to the public in April 1990. Eventually, a renovation and rebuilding programme for the Hall was begun in 1990; progress though was slow, again due to a lack of funds. This was to change in 1998 when the National Lottery Heritage Fund Urban Parks Programme announced an award of £2.15 million to rejuvenate the park. The project involved bringing the Hall back into use and improving the gardens, mostly by restoring lost features of Haden-Best's designs. It was completed in 2007 to much acclaim.

Haden Hill was the first park in the Borough of Sandwell to be awarded Green Flag status.

== Existing Park features ==
=== General Layout ===
The park is approximately crescent shaped, the core parkland running from the north, the site of the two houses, to the south where the boating lake is situated. The Corngreaves Nature Reserve extends from the south of the parkland in a westerly direction towards Corngreaves Hall. The River Stour forms much of the southern border of the reserve, with a broad footpath running alongside.

=== Haden Hall ===
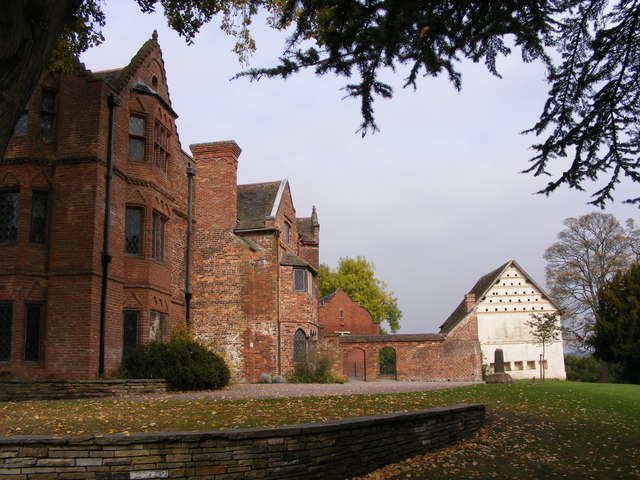
Haden Hall

Haden Hall is almost semi-detached to the Victorian house. It is sometimes called the 'Tudor Hall' but it is neither Tudor nor actually a Hall as the name Hall would suggest a medieval manor house. However, Haden Hall (or any earlier building on the site) was not a manor house or home of a Lord of the Manor. It was probably built around the late 1600s as the home of the moderately wealthy Haden family who, around that time, had begun to call themselves gentlemen as their wealth and status grew. Architectural evidence suggests that the Hall was later split into two dwellings. By the time Haden-Best inherited in the 1870s he wished to build a new house to live in, and the Hall was then occupied by his ageing aunt and later by his adopted daughter and her family.

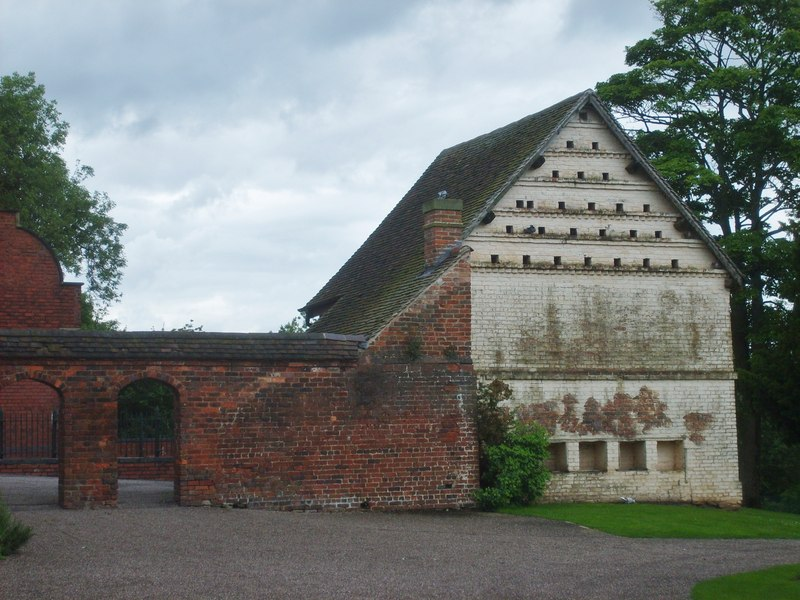
The dovecote

The Hall has been rebuilt and restored many times over its lifetime, and today is largely a copy of the building which once stood there. It is not known how much of the historic fabric remains.

A brick dovecote possibly originating from the seventeenth century is linked by a wall to the east side of the Hall.

=== Haden Hill House ===
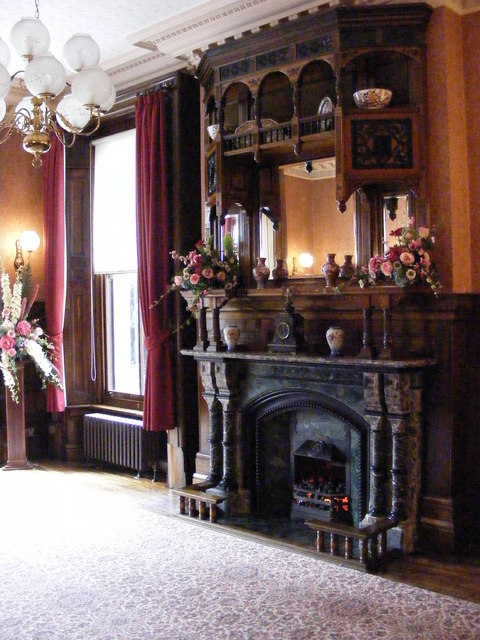
Inside Haden Hill House

George Alfred Haden Haden-Best inherited the estate in 1877 and work began on his new house soon after, although it was probably 1879 by the time he moved in. There would have been at least five bedrooms in the house as well as extensive servants' quarters. It is thought that Haden-Best's intention, on the death of his aunt, was to demolish Haden Hall and extend his house, so that the front door would occupy an imposing central position. Architectural evidence for this is the absence of quoins on the corner of the House to the right hand side of the front door. On the north side of the house was a separate complex of buildings comprising a carriage house (with living rooms on the first floor), a harness room with storage loft, a corn room with cellar and loft, stabling, a cow byre, washing shed, a coal shed, stables and a barn.

On the western side of the old duck pond were vineries, peach houses, ferneries, palm houses and potting sheds. A stoke house with three Quorn boilers provided the heating for the glasshouses.

Today, Haden Hill House is open to the public all year round. Guided tours of the buildings are available and plays, workshops and dances take place too. Authentic Victorian furniture and instruments are on display.

=== Grounds ===
In front of the east facade of Haden Hall is the remnant of a sandstone cross, likely medieval in origin. It once stood at the top of what now is Station Road, Old Hill and was moved to the Park in 1937. At the centre of the park is a natural 'bowl' of open grassland. In the days of Haden-Best, this was used for haymaking. It formerly accommodated a bandstand and a football field. By the side of a pathway below Haden Hill House there are two monuments where family pets are buried. One grave is for three cats, the other for a dog. A Ha ha was built before the estate came into the ownership of Haden-Best, separating the gardens and terrace of Haden Hall from the farmland beyond. This was removed during the 1960s to facilitate park maintenance but restored as part of the National Lottery Project.

A pool has been present to the west of the house since before Haden-Best's time. It has been altered several times, and was restored with a feeding platform as part of the National Lottery Project. At the southern end of the park, Haden-Best constructed a large pool known as the Boating Lake, with a boat house and two rustic bridges. The boat house and one of the bridges are no longer there, but the other bridge was recreated in 2002. Near the Boating Lake is a hermitage built by Haden-Best.

=== Corngreaves nature reserve ===
Following the closure of the Corngreaves Golf Course in 1999, a programme of tree-planting was undertaken to create a nature reserve which has been incorporated into the park.

=== Gallery ===
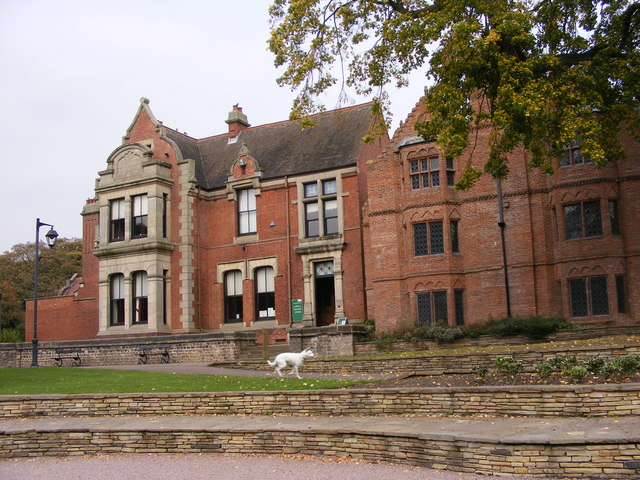
Haden Hill House.

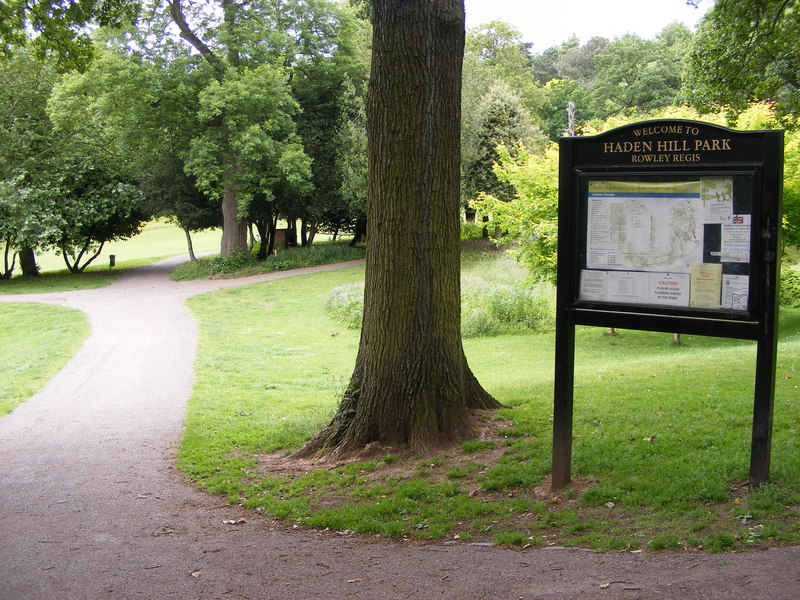
The entrance to the park.

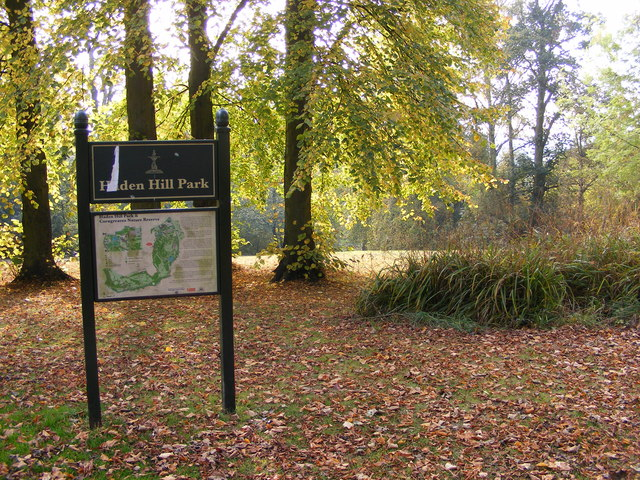
Woods in the park.

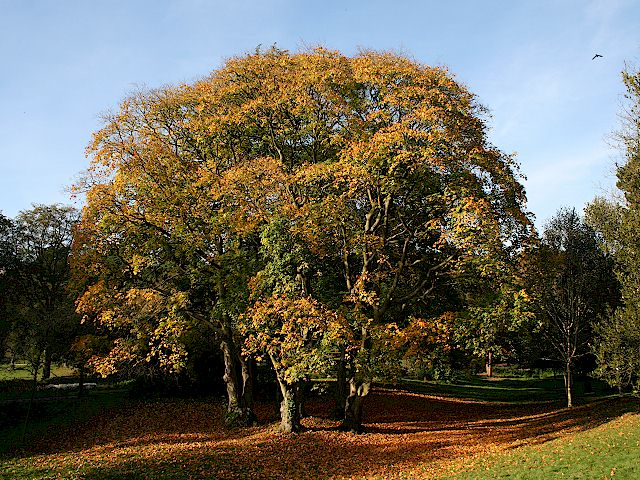
Autumnal Tree in the park.

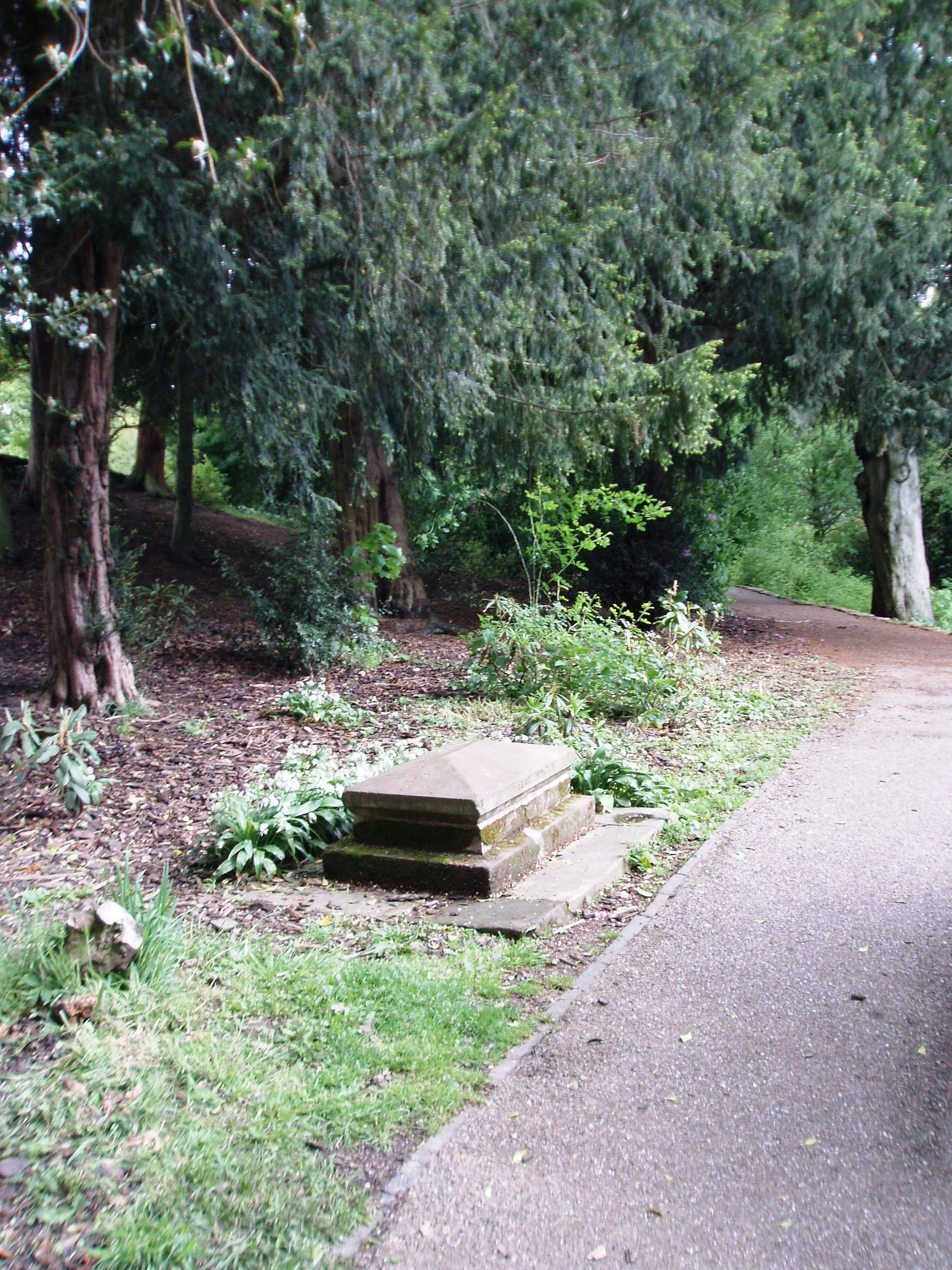
Cats Grave

== Former features ==
Swimming Pool

In July 1926, an unheated 75 by 30 feet outdoor swimming bath was opened by Charles Sitch M.P. on the site of demolished farm buildings to the immediate west of the stables block. It closed in 1966 and no trace remains.

On a slope below the houses was a building known as the Sons of Rest, where retired men would meet. The name derived from The Sons of Rest Movement, a social organisation that has provided leisure facilities for men of retirement age in and around Birmingham and the Black Country since 1927, and more recently for women as well. At its peak, the movement had 29 buildings. The Haden Hill Park building was opened in 1937 and destroyed by fire in 2000.

A bandstand donated by prominent local residents was erected in the grass bowl when the park entered public ownership in 1922. It was very popular during the 1920s hosting weekly performances through the summer, especially on Sunday evenings. In 1924 the council's decision to deduct 25 per cent from concert takings led to local bands boycotting the venue. In contrast, the Orchestral Society of Stewarts & Lloyds steel tube works at Coombs Wood donated the entire net proceeds from its concert to a council fund to provide chairs for the park. The bandstand was rebuilt in 1938 and removed in 1967.

In addition to the Boating Lake, Haden-Best constructed three small pools higher up the park which fed the Boating Lake through a series of Waterfalls. These have now been filled in.

== Past usage and events ==
The Glasgow Evening News of 19 September, 1891 reported that Joseph Darby had claimed a new record of 12 feet 11 inches for one backward jump at Haden Hill Park Fete. The report appeared to question the feat by adding "this seems somewhat 'steep' considering the previous record was 11 feet 8½ inches".

In June 1929, open-air classes for school children were held in the park. Topics covered included "Clothing and the Seasons", "Sunshine and Artificial Light" and "Exercise and Health".

There have been two football fields laid out in the grounds. One was in the grassy bowl, made in 1949, the other in the 9-acre field and was opened in 1953. Both had gone by the 1970s. In the 1970s the park hosted whippet racing organised by the Cradley Heath Whippet Racing Club. The Club was formed in 1957 in a revival of a traditional Black Country sport popular among the chain-makers of Cradley Heath.

Attractions that included a fun fair and Second World War re-enactment display for Cradley Heath's second annual carnival were staged at the park in July 1987.

== Corngreaves par 3 golf course ==
In 1977, a municipal nine-hole Par 3 golf course was created on land associated with Corngreaves Hall, to the immediate west of the nine-acre field, which had been incorporated into the Park in 1922. In the nineteenth century a mineral railway ran across this land connecting various collieries with the Dudley Canal. A section of the former railway's embankment was used as one of the tee locations; the green being 100 yards away in the valley below. In 1985, the nine acre field itself was incorporated into the golf course, making it an eighteen-hole course, again all holes being par 3. The course was closed in 1999 and planted over with trees, turned into a nature reserve and incorporated back into the park, including the land formerly belonging to Corngreaves Hall.

== Related nearby properties ==
=== Haden Hill Leisure Centre ===
In 1976, a modern leisure centre was built to the north of Haden Hill House, on the piece of land known as Temple Meadow, purchased by the Council in 1922 and partly incorporated into the park. The Leisure Centre hosted the 1981 John Courage English Professional Snooker Championship.

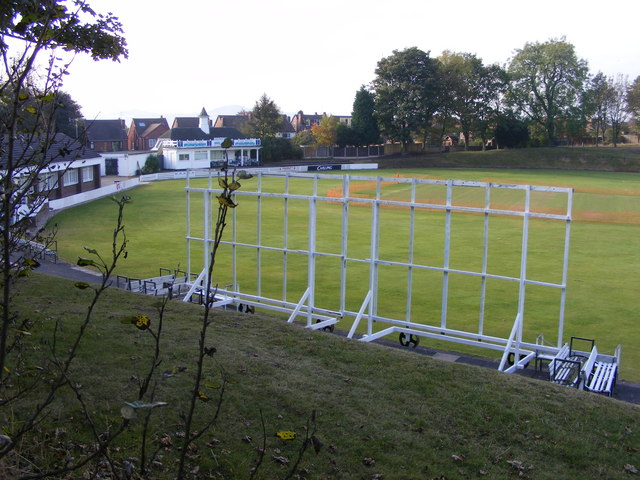
Old Hill Cricket Club

=== Old Hill Cricket Club and Old Hill Tennis Club ===
To the north west of the Park is the ground of Old Hill Cricket Club and the courts of Old Hill Tennis Club. These sites, formerly owned by Haden-Best, were leased out for sporting use in 1884 and were purchased by a charitable trust in 1934 for the benefit of the respective clubs. Old Hill Cricket Club is one of the most successful clubs in England, winning the ECB National Club Cricket Championship at Lord's in 1984, 1985, 1987 and 1993, and being runners-up in 1989. Its former players include seven internationals.
