= Hayden Creek (Lemhi River tributary) =

Stream in Idaho, U.S.

Coordinates: 44.86991°N 113.62624°W

Hayden Creek is a stream in the U.S. state of Idaho. It is a tributary to the Lemhi River.

Hayden Creek has the name of Jim Hayden, a pioneer citizen.
