= Hayden (electronics company) =

British electric guitar amplifier manufacturer

Hayden Amplification
- Type: Private
- Industry: Amplification
- Founded: 2000; 26 years ago
- Headquarters: Northampton, United Kingdom
- Area served: United Kingdom, United States
- Products: Amplifiers
- Website: Site

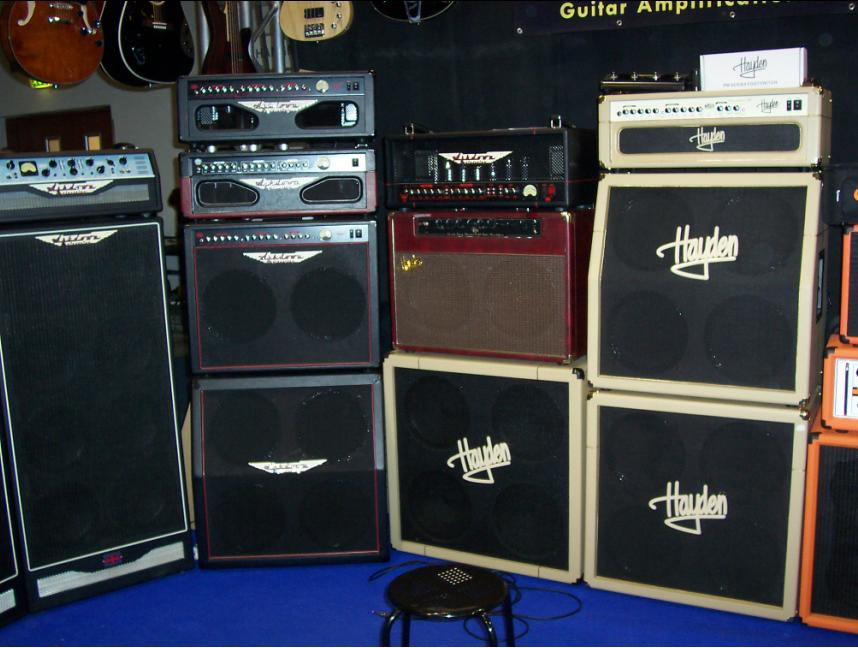
Hayden amplifiers (right) and Ashdown amplifiers (left)

Hayden is a British company which designs hand-wired electric guitar amplifiers. It is a sister company to Ashdown Engineering, which makes high-quality, hand-wired, vacuum-tube (or valve in Britain) amplifiers in England.

At the end of 2007 it was announced that Dave Green, Matamp's chief engineer, would be joining Hayden full-time as 'Valve Amp Guru'. The new designed by Dave Green range has been launched and comprises the products as listed below, a range of valve pedals is expected early 2011.

== Products ==
=== Hand wired series ===
- Peacemaker 100 Head (4x EL34) made in UK
- Classic Lead 80 Head and Combo (4 x ecc83, 4x EL34)
- Cotton Club 7/15 combo (3 x ecc83, 2 x EL84)
- Cotton Club 15/30 (3x ecc83 4xEL84)
- Petite 2 combo (1 x ecc83, 1x6V6)
- Petite 5 (2xecc83 1x6V6 +1 x EL84 switchable)
- Speakeasy 50 Head and Combo 5 x ecc83 2xEL34 + 2x6L6 switchable)
- Mofo 30 Head (3x ecc83 4 x EL84)
- Mofo 55 head and combo (4 x ecc83 2 x 6550)
- Mofo 100 head (4 x ecc83, 2x6L6+2 x EL34)

=== Manufactured Offshore ===
- Mofo 30 as above but more affordable (3x ecc83 4xEL84)
- Mofo 15 (3xECC83 2xEL84)
- Mofo 40 classic (mofo in a traditional wood cabinet)
- HGTA 20 head and combo (high gain all tube amplifier) (3 x ecc 83, 2 x EL84)
- HGTA 40 head and combo (as above) (3 x ecc 83 2 x EL34)

=== Peacemaker series(Now Discontinued) ===
- Peacemaker 40 and 60 watt combos
- Peacemaker 60 watt head
- Fallen angel 180 watt Head

=== FA DSP series (Now Discontinued) ===
- FA 100 and 50 watt DSP Combos
- FA DSP 100 watt head

== Notable Users ==
Artists who use Hayden Guitar Amplifiers;

- Carl Barat - Dirty Pretty Things
- Chris Urbanowicz - Editors
- Keith Murray - We Are Scientists
- Kevin Roentgen - Orson
- Henry Dartnall - The Young Knives
- Rick McNamara - Embrace
- Marcus "Fox" Barker - Disappointments
- Simon Neil - Biffy Clyro and Marmaduke Duke
- Jesse Hughes and Dave Catching - Eagles Of Death Metal
- Jamie Wallace - Velouria

== See also ==
- Ashdown Engineering
