= Haden (appliances) =

British Motorcycle brand

Haden Appliances
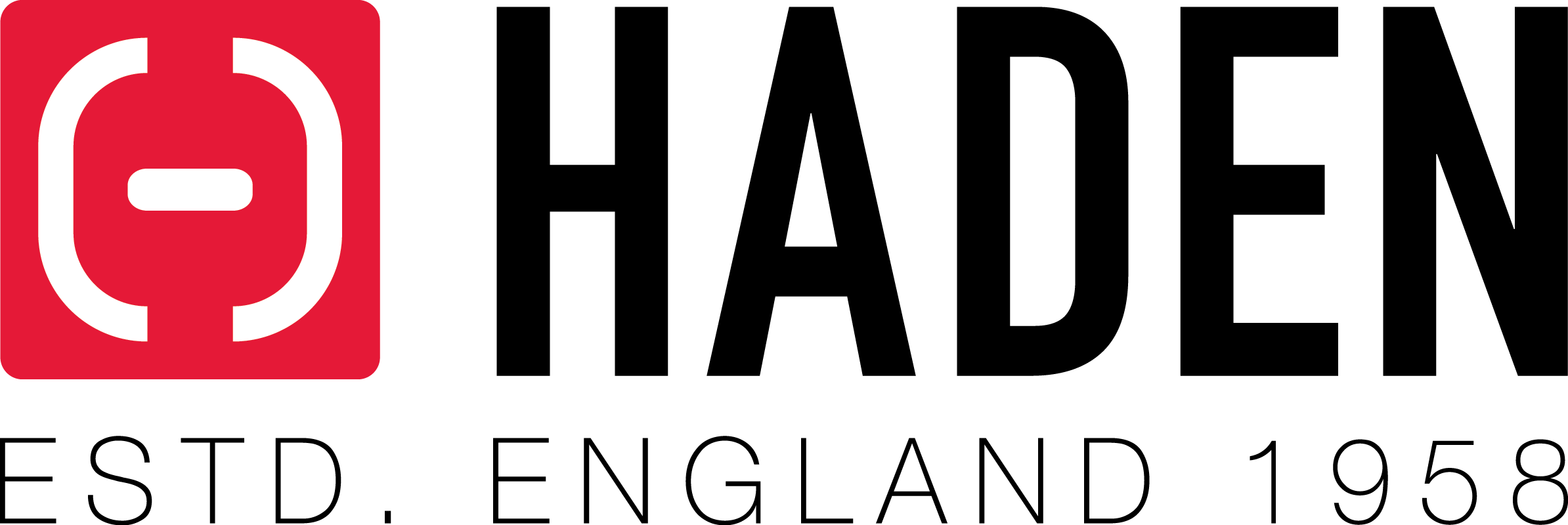
- Product type: Domestic appliances
- Current owner: Sabichi
- Country: United Kingdom
- Introduced: 1958; 68 years ago
- Markets: United States, United Kingdom and worldwide
- Previous owners: Pifco, Russell Hobbs, Inc.
- Website: www.haden.com; www.hadenusa.com

Haden Appliances (branded as Haden) is a British brand of kitchen appliances that include kettles, toasters and coffee makers. It was spun out of motorbike manufacturer Haden Motorcycles in 1958 by its then owner with purpose of manufacturing kettles.

It became one of the first companies in the United Kingdom to manufacture electric kettles. The company was acquired by a string of United States based owner, who continued to produce products under the brand name. The brand has been owned by Sabichi since 2016.

== History ==
A British motorcycle company from Birmingham, A.H. Haden Motorcycles became “Haden Bros” after Donald William Haden and Denis Howard Haden, took over the business after 1937.

Haden, as the appliance brand was founded in 1958 after Denis Howard Haden founded his own, separate company, D.H. Haden Ltd. to focus his efforts on manufacturing kettles.

Haden Appliances was purchased by Pifco in 2000. and production at the company's Burntwood factory ceased the following year. Pifco was later acquired in 2001 which meant the brand fell under the ownership of US company Salton Group and then Spectrum Brands before being sold to homewares business company Sabichi in 2016. In 2019 Haden Appliance branded products were for the first time launched in the United States.

== Sales ==
Haden products retail in the UK and the United States and other countries.
