= Hayden Creek (Minnesota) =

Stream in Minnesota, U.S.

Coordinates: 46°23′20″N 94°45′55″W

Hayden Creek is a stream in the U.S. state of Minnesota.

Hayden Creek was named for an early settler.

== See also ==
- List of rivers of Minnesota
