= Haden Hill =

Residential area in the West Midlands, England

Coordinates: 52.4673°N 2.0663°W

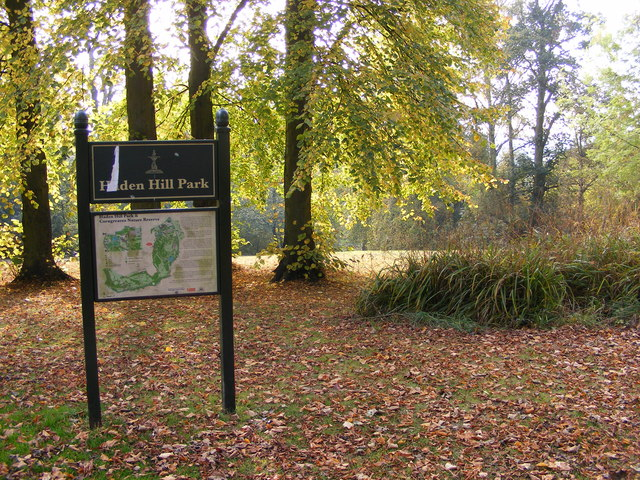
The parkland next to Haden Hill House

Haden Hill is a residential area in the West Midlands of England, straddling the border of Halesowen and Cradley Heath townships and the modern boroughs of Dudley and Sandwell.

Its most famous landmarks are Haden Hill Park and the historic Haden Hill House, both of which were constructed during the 19th century.

The River Stour flows through Haden Hill, and formed the historic county boundary of Staffordshire (Cradley Heath) and Shropshire (Halesowen). The Halesowen side of the river later became part of Worcestershire, and in 1966 all of Haden Hill was moved into Worcestershire when the Staffordshire side of the river (originally in Rowley Regis Borough) became part of Warley County Borough.

Since 1974, all of Haden Hill has existed within the West Midlands county, though it is still split over two different local authorities, with Halesowen now being part of the Metropolitan Borough of Dudley and Cradley Heath being part of the Metropolitan Borough of Sandwell.

The busy A459 road between Halesowen and Dudley passes through Haden Hill, and gives the area bus links with Merry Hill Shopping Centre, Dudley, Netherton, Halesowen and Birmingham.

The British songwriter Owen Tromans grew up in Haden Hill and his 2013 release For Haden features songs that refer to the area. The inner sleeve features a mythologised representation of Haden Hill.
