= Hayden Mountain (Oregon) =

Mountain in Oregon, United States

- Location within Oregon Location within the United States

Highest point
- Elevation: 5120+ ft (1561+ m)
- Coordinates: 42°06′25″N 122°05′59″W

Geography
- Location: Klamath County, Oregon, U.S.
- Parent range: Siskiyou Mountains
- Topo map: USGS Chicken Hills

Hayden Mountain is located in the Siskiyou Mountains of Klamath County in the U.S. State of Oregon.

== See also ==
- Applegate Trail
- Hayden Mountain Summit
