= Esther Hayden =

American poet (1713–1758)

- Born: Esther Allen; 1713
- Died: February 14, 1758 (aged 45)
- Known for: Poet; Religious writer
- Notable work: A Short Account of the Life, Death and Character of Esther Hayden
- Spouse: Samuel Hayden

Esther Hayden (née Allen; 1713 – February 14, 1758) was an American poet who is known for her poem A Short Account of the Life, Death and Character of Esther Hayden (1759), which was written on her deathbed.

== Biography and writing ==
Hayden was born in 1713. She was the daughter of Samuel Allen and the identity of her mother is unknown. Hayden was married to Samuel Hayden of Braintree, Massachusetts, and together they had nine children. She died on February 14, 1758, aged 45 after suffering from a serious illness for over a year.

Short Account of the Life, Death and Character of Esther Hayden (1759) may have been published as a memorial to Hayden. The volume includes a short testimonial by an anonymous author and a longer tribute by a "near Relative". This near relative describes Hayden as a woman who "strove for Grace and Holiness, / That Christ might be her Part", and who "Appear'd a precious Saint."

The poem written by Hayden is titled Composed About Six Weeks Before Her Death, When Under Distressing Circumstances. It consists of a verse of 167 lines dedicated to her family and friends. Like many deathbed statements written at the time, the poem urges them to Christian devotion and expresses concern for their religious character. She also describes her own religious insecurities as she laments her physical and mental pain, her "wasting sickness" and her "fear to die".

Although this is Hayden's only extant work, the poem suggests the hand of an experienced writer.
