= Karl von der Heyden =

German-American businessman (born 1936)

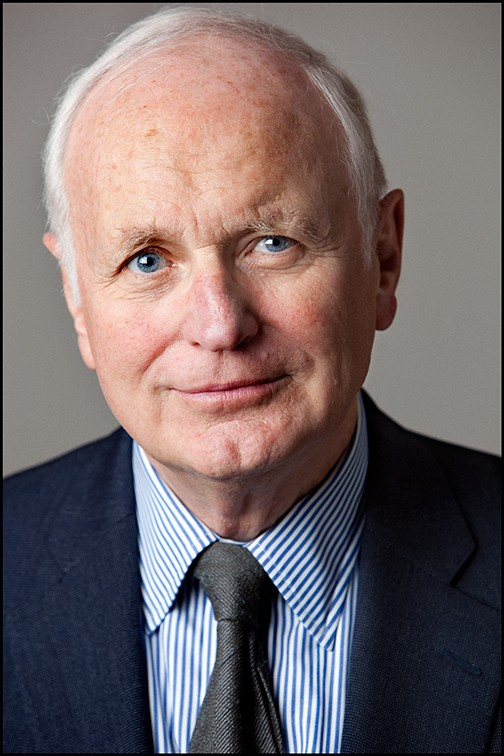
- Born: 1936 (age 89–90); Berlin, Germany
- Education: Duke University; The Wharton School
- Occupation: Businessman
- Known for: CEO of RJR Nabisco; CFO of PepsiCo

Karl von der Heyden is a German-American businessman best known for his former roles as the Co-Chairman and CEO of RJR Nabisco, and CFO of PepsiCo, as well as multiple other positions and roles in the world of finance and business.

== Early life ==
Karl von der Heyden was born in 1936 in Berlin, Germany, and attended the Free University of Berlin. He graduated from Duke University in 1962 and obtained an MBA degree from the Wharton School of the University of Pennsylvania in 1964.

== Career ==
Karl von der Heyden began his business career as a management trainee at the Berliner Bank AG. He joined Coopers & Lybrand, Philadelphia, in 1963, and in 1966 he moved to Pitney Bowes, where he advanced to the position of corporate controller.

Karl von der Heyden was senior vice president, chief financial officer and a director of Heinz. He joined Heinz in 1980 as vice president of finance and treasurer. Previously, von der Heyden had worked for PepsiCo in various senior management capacities: vice president, controller from 1974 to 1977, chief financial officer of Pepsi-Cola Company from 1977–1979, and then vice president of manufacturing for the Pepsi-Cola Bottling Group.

In December 1993 he took over as president and chief executive officer at financially troubled Metallgesellschaft Corp. on an interim basis and successfully restructured the company in a period of seven months. He had also served as Chairman of the Financial Accounting Standard Board’s Advisory Council (FASAC).

He was Vice Chairman of the Board of Directors of PepsiCo, Inc. from 1996 to 2001. He had rejoined the Company in September 1996 as Vice Chairman and Chief Financial Officer. During his tenure, he concentrated on re-focusing the company by spinning off or selling the restaurant companies, buying Tropicana and Quaker Oats, and taking the bottling business, Pepsi Bottling Group, public, among other things. He had previously retired from RJR Nabisco, where he was co-chairman and chief executive officer, through May 1993 and chief financial officer since 1989.

== Philanthropy ==
Karl von der Heyden has made substantial donations to Duke University. He and his wife donated $1 million to the University in 1995 to establish the von der Heyden Fellows Program Endowment Fund and $4 million in 2000 to expand the libraries. The Karl and Mary Ellen von der Heyden Pavilion was completed in 2005, and remains a popular student eatery, meeting, and study space on Duke University's West Campus. Travel + Leisure Magazine has included the Karl and Mary Ellen von der Heyden Pavilion in their list of America's most beautiful college libraries.

In 2015, von der Heyden gave $7 million to Duke towards a new arts center and a flexible theatre in the building is named in his honor. His 2015 gift also included $1 million to help fund graduate fellowships. That gift was used to establish The von der Heyden Family Global Health Fellowship Fund, which will continue to support graduate level studies through the Duke Global Health Institute.

In 2007, the Mary Ellen von der Heyden Fellowship in Fiction was established to bring talented novelists to Berlin as part of the American Academy’s residential fellowship program. In 2017, the Mary Ellen von der Heyden Fellowship was established at the Cullman Center for Scholars and Writers of the New York Public Library.

== Other ==
Karl von der Heyden is the recipient of The International Center in New York's Award of Excellence and the Ellis Island Medal of Honor. In 2010 he was inducted into the Financial Executives International Hall of Fame. In 2011, he was awarded the Duke University Medal for Distinguished Meritorious Service.

Karl von der Heyden has served on the boards of Huntington Ingalls Industries, Inc., Macy's, Inc, AstraZeneca, NYSE Euronext, DreamWorks Animation, Aramark, Cadbury Schweppes, and numerous other companies. He served as Co-Chairman of the American Academy in Berlin. and as a former trustee of Duke University, the YMCA of Greater New York, and other nonprofit organizations.

Karl von der Heyden is the author of the memoir Surviving Berlin, An Oral History, which was released in Germany under the title Von Berlin Nach New York. He has two children and five grandchildren, and lives with his wife, Mary Ellen, in New York City.
