= Heydon (surname) =

Heydon is a surname. Notable people with the surname include:

- Benjamin Heydon (1567–1607), English Anglican clergyman
- Charles Heydon (1845–1932), Australian politician and judge
- Christopher Heydon (1561–1623), English soldier, politician and astrologist
- Dyson Heydon (born 1943), Australian judge
- Henry Heydon (died 1504)
- John Heydon (died 1479)
- John Heydon (astrologer) (1629 – c. 1667), English philosopher, astrologer and writer
- John Heydon (footballer) (1928–2012), English footballer
- Sir John Heydon (died 1653), English Royalist military commander and mathematician
- Louis Heydon (1848–1919), Australian politician
- Martin Heydon (born 1978), Irish politician
- Mike Heydon (1874–1913), American baseball player
- Nigel Heydon (born 1970), English darts player
- Rob Heydon (born 1970), Canadian film director
