= John Hayden (priest) =

Irish Anglican priest

John Hayden (1794–1855) was a nineteenth century Anglican priest.

Gough was born in County Kilkenny and educated at Trinity College, Dublin, graduating BA in 1814 and Master of Arts in 1840.He was Archdeacon of Derry from 1849 until his death.
