= Haden (motorcycle) =

British motorcycle manufacturer

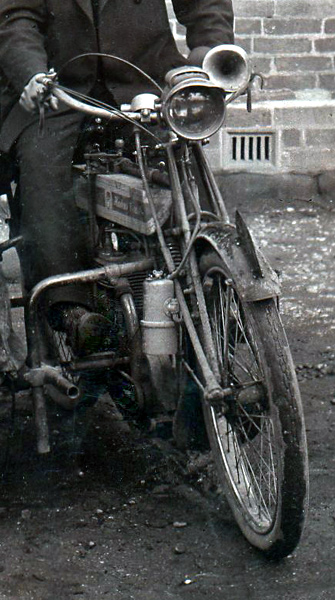
- Early Haden motorcycle, possibly a pre-production prototype, c. 1906–09. Ridden here by A. H. Haden, with sidecar attached
- Company type: Private company
- Industry: Motorcycle
- Founded: c. 1880
- Founder: George Joseph Haden
- Defunct: 2002
- Fate: Closed due to global competition
- Headquarters: Birmingham, United Kingdom
- Key people: Alfred Hamlet Haden

A.H. Haden Motorcycles was a British motorcycle marque from Birmingham that produced bicycles and later motorbikes from 1880 until the 1930s. After World War II the company transitioned to manufacturing cycle and motorcycle parts, which it did until it closed in 2002 due to global competition.

== History ==
=== Foundation and peak production ===
Haden was originally a bicycle-making business in Hockley, Birmingham, begun in the late 1880s, after the safety bicycle was introduced. The business passed from George Joseph Haden to his son Alfred Hamlet Haden, who continued making bicycles from 1902 until 1912. They began manufacturing motorcycles in about 1906, and went into more extensive motorcycle production shortly before the First World War, when in 1913 A. H. Haden bought the Regal motorcycle company.

The Haden marque was best known from 1912 to 1924. The main motorcycle was marketed under the Haden name as the "New Comet", and it was a long-standing independent brand. It used parts from Villiers, PeCo, JAP, Precision, and Climax, and was entered in the Isle of Man TT races in 1920 (10th place) and 1921. The New Comet was discontinued in 1924, but in 1931 small numbers of 198 cc models were produced with Villiers parts. The machine was probably named "New Comet" to distinguish it from the earlier "Comet" motorcycle produced by the Comet Motor Works, at New Cross, London (1902–1907). It is possible A. H. Haden had bought out the owners of the earlier London-based Comet.

=== Transition to parts manufacturer ===
Alfred's sons Donald William Haden and Denis Howard Haden, took over the business after 1937. It then became "Haden Bros.", and made tank parts for the military during the Second World War. After the War, Haden Bros. continued to be well known for making cycle and motorcycle parts, and these were sold worldwide from 1954 until 2002 when the company folded due to overseas competition.

=== Legacy ===
Denis Howard Haden founded a separate company Haden Appliances to manufacture electric kettles in 1958. This was later acquired by a United States company and continued to manufacture home appliances under the Haden brand name.

The only known surviving Haden machines are 347 cc two-stroke cycle models.

The Haden marque is not to be confused with the short-lived Hayden motorcycle, produced in 1904 only for F. Hayden of Cheltenham, by Kynochs of Birmingham.

An archive of research and original papers about the manufacture of New Comet motorcycles is held by the Vintage Motorcycle Club in Burton-upon-Trent, where they are available for inspection.
