= Haiden family of Nuremberg =

German family of musicians, luthiers and merchants

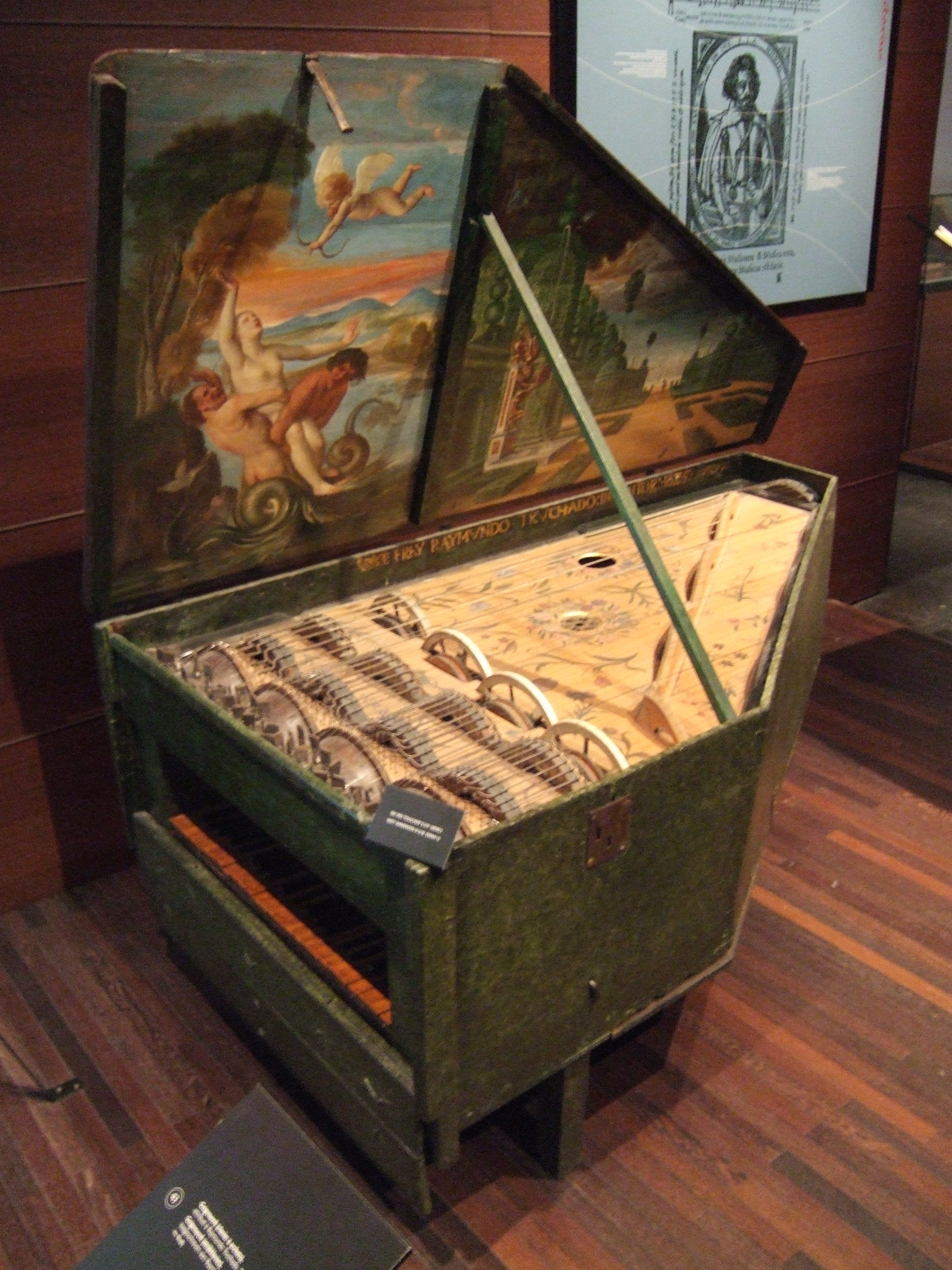
Truchado his Geigenwerk, the only geigenwerk that is still in existence. Haiden his geigenwerks don't exist anymore.

The Haiden family (spelled variously Heyden, Heiden, Hayden, Heyd) was a prominent German family of musicians, musical instrument makers, and copper merchants. The family was part of the aristocracy in 16th and 17th century Nuremberg, Germany during the ages of the German Renaissance and the Protestant Reformation. The family came to Nuremberg in 1500 when brewer Hans Haiden settled in the city with his wife and children. His son, the composer, teacher, and music theorist Sebald Heyden (1499–1561), was the first musician in the family.

Sebald's son, Hans Haiden (1536–1613), was a musical instrument maker, organist, and copper merchant who invented the geigenwerk. He had seven sons, two of which became musicians: the composer, organist, and poet Hans Christoph Haiden (1572–1617), and the composer, instrumentalist, poet and copper merchant David Haiden (1580–1660).
