= Aidan =

- Pronunciation: /ˈeɪdɪn/
- Gender: Male
- Language: English

Origin
- Language: Gaelic
- Meaning: born of fire/the fiery one/little fiery one/bringer of fire/one of fire
- Region of origin: Ireland

Other names
- Variant forms: Aiden, Aidyn, Aidin, Adin, Adon, Adan, Aden, Aedan, Aydan, Ayden
- Derived: Aodhán
- Popularity: see popular names

Aidan and Aiden are anglicised versions of the Irish male given name Aodhán. The Irish language female equivalent is Aodhnait.

== Etymology and spelling ==
The name is derived from the name Aodhán, which is a pet form of Aodh. The personal name Aodh means "fiery" and/or "bringer of fire" and was the name of a Celtic sun god (see Aed).

Formerly common only in Ireland, Scotland and Wales, the name and its variants have become popular in England, the United States, Canada, and Australia. In the 2010s, Aiden rose to the 13th most popular name in the United States as the given name of 129,433 boys, while Aidan ranked 156th as the given name of 25,399 boys. In the 2000s, Aiden was 54th most popular name in the United States as the given name of 83,527 boys while Aidan ranked 55th having been bestowed on 76,493 boys. Other variants are less popular, such as Hayden 87th, Ayden 156th, Aden 333rd, Aydan 808th, and Aydin 960th, according to the United States Social Security Database. "Aidan/Aiden" was the most popular boys' name in Canada in 2007. Aiden was the 38th most popular name given to boys in Canada in 2022.

Its popularity is also reflected in the occurrence of similar-sounding names such as Braden, Caden, Hayden, and Jadon.

Aidan (or any reasonable variant) as a girl's name does not appear in the top one thousand names for girls from the same database, although it has occasionally been used for girls.

== Notable people with the given name ==
=== Middle Ages ===
- Áedán mac Gabráin (ruled c. 574 – c. 609), King of Dál Riata, sometimes anglicised as Aidan of Dalriada
- Aeddan ap Blegywryd (died 1018), Welsh prince of Gwynedd
- Adam, Earl of Angus (ruled from before c. 1189)
- Saint Máedóc of Ferns (550–632), also known as Áedan
- Saint Aidan of Lindisfarne (died 651), Irish missionary and bishop

=== Modern times: Aidan and Aiden ===
==== Arts and entertainment ====
- Aidan Baker (born 1974/1975), Canadian musician
- Aidan Banks, English guitarist
- Aidan Browne, Northern Irish television presenter
- Aidan Bryant (born 1987), American comedian
- Aidan Cassar (born 1999), Maltese singer-songwriter
- Aidan Chambers (1934–2025), English author
- Aidan Chollet (born 2004), French snowboarder
- Aidan Coffey, Irish musician
- Aidan Coleman (born 1976), Australian poet and speechwriter
- Aidan Connolly (born 1991), Irish fiddler and teacher
- Aidan Cooney, Irish television presenter
- Aiden Curtiss (born 1998), British-American fashion model
- Aidan J. David (born 1981), English actor
- Aidan Davis (born 1997), English street dancer, rapper, and television host
- Aidan Devine, Canadian film actor
- Aiden Dillard, American film director and artist
- Aidan Dunne, Irish art critic
- Aidan Fennessy (died 2020), Australian playwright, stage director, and actor
- Aiden Flowers (born 2004), American actor
- Aidan Gallagher (born 2003), American actor
- Aidan Gillen (born 1968), Irish actor
- Aidan Gillett (born 1986), Australian actor
- Aidan Girt, Canadian drummer
- Aidan Gould (born 1996), American actor
- Aiden Grennell (born 1920), Irish actor
- Aiden Grimshaw (born 1991), English musician
- Aidan Hartley (born 1965), British author and journalist
- Aiden J. Harvey (born 1944), English comedian
- Aidan Hawken (born 1975), American musician
- Aidan Higgins (1927–2015), Irish writer
- Aidan Hughes (born 1956), English artist
- Aiden James (born 1982), American pop singer
- Aidan A. Kelly (born 1940), American academic, poet, and influential figure
- Aidan Knight (born 1986), Canadian musician
- Aidan Laprete (born 2001), American singer, songwriter, actor, and record producer
- Aiden Leslie (born 1977), American pop singer-songwriter
- Aidan Mathews (born 1956), Irish poet and dramatist
- Aidan McArdle (born 1970), Irish actor
- Aiden McCaig (born 1997), Canadian-American podcaster
- Aidan Meehan, Irish artist and author
- Aidan Moffat (born 1973), Scottish musician
- Aidan O'Rourke (born 1975), Scottish musician
- Aidan Power (born 1979), Irish television and radio presenter
- Aidan Quinn (born 1959), American actor
- Aidan Salahova (born 1964), Azeri-Russian artist and gallerist
- Aiden Shaw (born 1966), English author, model, and pornographic film actor
- Aidan Shipley (born 1992), Canadian actor and filmmaker
- Aiden Thomas, American author
- Aidan Turner (born 1983), Irish actor
- Aiden Turner (born 1977), English actor
- Aidan Zammit (born 1965), Maltese musician
- Aiden Zhane (born 1990), American drag performer

==== Politics ====
- Aidan Burley (born 1979), British politician
- Aidan Crawley (1908–1993), British politician, journalist, television executive, and editor
- Aidan Davitt (born 1978), Irish politician
- Aidan Eames, Irish politician and solicitor
- Aidan Key (born 1964), American educator, author, speaker, and community organizer
- Aidan Kohn-Murphy (born 2004), American political activist and TikTok content creator
- Aidan Larkin (born 1946), Irish politician
- Aidan Maloney (1920–2018), Canadian politician
- Aidan McGrath, Irish youth activist
- Aidan McLindon (born 1980), Australian politician
- Aidan McQuade, Irish politician
- Aidan O'Connor, Irish politician
- Aidan O'Neill (born 1961), Scottish advocate, barrister, and King's Counsel

==== Religion ====
- Aidan Cross (priest) (1918–1989), Anglican religious leader in South Africa
- Francis Aidan Gasquet (1846–1929), English cardinal
- Aidan Kelly (born 1940), American Wiccan
- Aidan Nichols (born 1948), English academic and Catholic priest
- Aiden Wilson Tozer (1897–1963), American preacher
- Aidan Troy, Irish Catholic priest

==== Sports ====
- Aidan Apodaca (born 1996), American soccer player
- Aidan Baker (born 1964), English cricketer
- Aidan Barlow (born 2000), English footballer
- Aiden Blizzard (born 1984), Australian cricketer
- Aiden Bonar (born 1999), Australian rules footballer
- Aidan Brady (Gaelic footballer) (1930–1993), Irish Gaelic football goalkeeper
- Aidan Breen, Fermanagh Gaelic footballer
- Aidan Brooker (born 1995), South African cricketer
- Aidan Browne (born 1998), Irish Gaelic footballer
- Aidan Butler (born 1974), Irish hurler
- Aidan Butterworth (born 1961), English footballer
- Aiden Cairns (1917–1992), Australian rugby league footballer
- Aidan Caves (born 1995), Canadian track cyclist
- Aidan Chippendale (born 1992), English footballer
- Aidan Coleman (born 1988), Irish jockey
- Aidan Collins (born 1986), English footballer
- Aidan Connolly (born 1995), Scottish footballer
- Aidan Corr (born 1994), Australian rules footballer
- Aidan Coyne (born 2003), Australian footballer
- Aidan Cummins (born 1979), Irish hurler
- Aidan Curry (born 2002), American baseball player
- Aidan Daly (born 1978), New Zealand basketball player
- Aidan Daniels (born 1998), Canadian soccer player
- Aidan Davison (born 1968), British football goalkeeper and coach
- Aidan de Brune (1874–1946), Australian writer and long-distance walker
- Aidan Devaney, Sligo Gaelic football goalkeeper
- Aidan Dorgan (born 1973), Irish Gaelic footballer and manager
- Aidan Downes (born 1988), Irish footballer
- Aiden English, ring name of American wrestler Matthew Rehwold (born 1987)
- Aidan Fennelly, Irish Gaelic footballer
- Aidan Ferris (born 1996), Scottish footballer
- Aiden Fink (born 2004), Canadian ice hockey player
- Aiden Fisher (born 2003), American football player
- Aidan Fitzgerald (born 1980), Irish Gaelic footballer
- Aidan Fitzpatrick (born 2001), Scottish footballer
- Aidan Flanagan (born 1974), Irish hurler
- Aidan Fogarty (Kilkenny hurler) (born 1982), Irish hurling player
- Aidan Fogarty (Offaly hurler) (born 1958), Irish hurling player
- Aidan Fulton (born 1994), Scottish footballer
- Aidan Guerra (born 1988), Australian rugby league player
- Aidan Harte (born 1988), Irish hurler
- Aidan Healy, Irish hurler
- Aidan Heaney (born 1969), English footballer and coach
- Aidan Heslop (born 2002), British high diver
- Aidan Hubbard (born 2003), American football player
- Aidan Hutchinson (born 2000), American football player
- Aidan Igiehon (born 2000), Irish basketball player
- Aidan Jenniker (born 1989), South African footballer
- Aidan John (born 2000), Canadian football player
- Aidan Kearney (hurler) (born 1984), Irish hurler
- Aidan Kearney (rugby union) (born 1979), Irish rugby union player
- Aidan Keena (born 1999), Irish footballer
- Aidan Kelly (born 1994), American luger
- Aidan Kirk (born 1986), New Zealand rugby league player
- Aidan Laros (born 2002), South African-American football player
- Aidan Laughery (born 2003), American football player
- Aidan Lennon, Irish Gaelic football goalkeeper
- Aidan Liu (born 2000), American soccer player
- Aidan Lyons (1878–1910), South African cricketer
- Aiden Maher (born 1946), English footballer
- Aiden Markram (born 1994), South African cricketer
- Aiden Marsh (born 2003), English professional footballer
- Aidan McAdams (born 1999), Scottish football goalkeeper
- Aiden McCabe (born 1987), Irish hurler
- Aidan McCaffery (born 1957), English footballer
- Aidan McCarry (born 1963), Irish hurler
- Aidan McCarthy (born 2000), Irish hurler
- Aidan McCormack (born 1992), Irish hurler
- Aidan McCullen (born 1977), Irish rugby player
- Aidan McDonough (born 1999), American ice hockey player
- Aiden McFadden (born 1998), American soccer player
- Aiden McGeady (born 1986), Irish footballer
- Aidan McHugh (born 2000), British tennis player
- Aidan McMullan (born 1997), Canadian rugby union player
- Aiden Mesias (born 1999), English footballer
- Aidan Miller (born 2004), American baseball player
- Aidan Mizell, American football player
- Aiden Moffat (born 1996), British racing driver
- Aidan Morgan (born 2001), New Zealand rugby union player
- Aidan Morris (born 2001), American soccer player
- Aiden Morris (born 1993), English cricketer
- Aidan Murphy (footballer) (born 1967), English footballer and coach
- Aidan Murphy (born 2003), Australian sprinter
- Aidan Newhouse (born 1972), English footballer
- Aidan Nesbitt (born 1997), Scottish footballer
- Aidan Nolan (born 1993), Irish hurler
- Aidan Nugent, Armagh Gaelic footballer
- Aidan O'Brien (born 1969), Irish horse-racing trainer
- Aidan O'Brien (football manager), Irish Gaelic footballer and manager
- Aiden O'Brien (born 1993), English footballer
- Aidan O'Connell (born 1998), American football player
- Aidan O'Halloran, Irish rugby union player
- Aidan O'Kane (born 1979), Northern Irish footballer
- Aidan O'Mahony (born 1982), Irish Gaelic footballer
- Aiden O'Neill (born 1998), Australian football player
- Aidan O'Rourke (born 1976), Irish Gaelic footballer and manager
- Aidan O'Shea (Kerry Gaelic footballer) (born 1985), Irish Gaelic footballer
- Aidan O'Shea (Mayo Gaelic footballer) (born 1990), Irish Gaelic footballer
- Aidan O'Sullivan (born 1987), Irish Gaelic footballer
- Aidan Olivier (born 1984), South African cricketer
- Aiden Palmer (born 1987), English footballer
- Aidan Parker (born 1983), Australian rules footballer
- Aidan Price (born 1981), Irish footballer
- Aidan Riley (born 1991), Australian rules footballer
- Aidan Roach (born 1990), Australian water polo player
- Aidan Roark (1905–1984), Irish polo player
- Aidan Robbins (born 2000), American football player
- Aidan Ross (born 1995), New Zealand rugby league player
- Aidan Ryan (Tipperary hurler) (born 1965), Irish hurler
- Aidan Ryan (Cork hurler) (born 1986), Irish hurler
- Aidan Sarikaya (born 1996), New Zealand field hockey player
- Aidan Sezer (born 1991), Turkish-Australian rugby league player
- Aidan Smith (born 1997), Scottish footballer
- Aidan Somers (born 1946), Irish hurler
- Aidan Stone (born 1999), English football goalkeeper
- Aidan Thomas, English footballer
- Aidan Thompson (born 2002), American ice hockey player
- Aiden Tolman (born 1988), Australian rugby league player
- Aidan Toua (born 1990), Papua New Guinean rugby player
- Aidan Treacy (born 1991), Irish hurler
- Aiden Wagner (born 1994), Australian motorcycle racer
- Aidan Walsh (born 1990), Irish hurler and Gaelic footballer
- Aidan Walsh (boxer) (born 1997), Northern Irish boxer
- Aidan Warner, American football player
- Aidy White (born 1991), Irish footballer
- Aiden Williams (born 2000), American football player
- Aidan Wilson (born 1999), Scottish footballer
- Aidan Zingel (born 1990), Australian volleyball player
- Aidan Zittersteijn (born 1999), Cook Island lawn bowler

==== Other professions ====
- Aiden Aslin (born 1994), British Ukrainian soldier
- Aidan Bellenger (born 1950), English historian, schoolmaster, and Benedictine monk
- Aiden Byrne (born 1972), English chef
- J. Aidan Carney (born 1934), Irish pathologist
- Aidan Delgado (born 1981), American soldier and anti-war activist
- Aidan Dodson (born 1962), English Egyptologist and historian
- Aidan Heavey (born 1953), Irish businessman
- John Aidan Liddell (1888–1915), English pilot
- Aidan MacCarthy (1914–1992), Irish doctor
- Aidan McAnespie (1965–1988), Irish victim of the Troubles
- Aidan Southall (1920–2009), British cultural anthropologist
- Aidan Sprot (1919–2021), British Army officer

=== Ayden ===
- Ayden Callaghan (born 1981), Irish-English actor
- Ayden Duffy (born 1986), English association footballer
- Ayden Eberhardt (born 1998), American football player
- Ayden Garnes (born 2003), American football player
- Ayden Heaven (born 2006), English footballer
- Ayden Johnstone (born 1996), New Zealand rugby union player
- Ayden Mayeri (born 1990), Iranian-American actress, comedian, and writer
- Ayden Owens-Delerme (born 2000), Puerto Rican athlete
- Ayden Sng (born 1993), Singaporean actor

== Fictional characters ==
- "Aidan" (The Inside episode), the title of episode 9 of the American television series The Inside
- Aidan Brosnan, fictional character played by Sean Maguire in the British soap opera EastEnders
- Aiden Burn, fictional female character in the American television series CSI: NY
- Aiden Dennison, fictional character in the American television series South of Nowhere
- Aidan Devane, fictional character played by Aiden Turner in the American soap opera All My Children
- Aidan R. Fiero, fictional character played by Zanjoe Marudo in the Filipino drama series Dirty Linen
- Aiden Ford, fictional character in the Canadian television series Stargate Atlantis
- Aidan Foster, fictional character in the Australian soap opera Neighbours
- Aiden Lucas, fictional character in the American television series Ghost Whisperer
- Aidan Lynch, fictional character in the novel Harry Potter and the Goblet of Fire by J.K. Rowling
- Aiden Pearce, protagonist in the video game Watch Dogs
- Aidan Shaw, fictional character played by John Corbett in the American television series Sex and the City
- Aidan Waite, fictional character in the American Syfy drama/horror Being Human
- Aidan, fictional character in the American television series Supernatural (American TV series)
- Aiden Caldwell, protagonist in the video game Dying Light 2

== See also ==
- St. Aidan's (disambiguation)
- Aiden (band), an American band
- Aiden Lair, historic property in Minerva, NY where Theodore Roosevelt stopped on his way to take the Oath of President at Buffalo (Sept. 14, 1901)
- W.H.L. McCourtie Estate, originally called Aiden Lair, in Somerset Center, Michigan
- Pamela Aidan, pen name of American fiction writer Pamela Mogen (born 1953)
- List of Irish-language given names
- Adin
- Aidin (name)
- Aydin (name)
