= Edin =

Male given name

- Gender: Male

Other gender
- Feminine: Edina

Origin
- Origin: Arabic
- Meaning: 'Faith, Delight'

Other names
- Variant form: Adin

Edin is a Bosnian masculine given name. In the Balkans, Edin is popular among Bosniaks in the former Yugoslav nations. The name is either a modification of the name Eden, which means "delight", or a modification of the name Adin, which is derived from the Arabic word دين (dīn), meaning faith. The feminine equivalent of the name is Edina. Notable people with the name include:

== Given name ==
- Edin Ademović (born 1987), Bosnian footballer
- Edin Ajdinović (born 2001), Serbian footballer
- Edin Cornelius Alfsen (1896–1966), Norwegian missionary
- Edin Atić (born 1997), Bosnian footballer
- Edin Bahtić (born 1956), Bosnian footballer
- Edin Bahtić (footballer, born 1996) (born 1996), Austrian footballer
- Edin Bašić (born 1979), Bosnian footballer
- Edin Bavčić (born 1984), Bosnian basketball player
- Edin Cocalić (born 1987), Bosnian footballer
- Edin Ćurić (born 1962), Bosnian footballer
- Edin Đerlek (born 1987), Serbian lawyer and politician
- Dino Merlin (Edin Dervishalidovic, born 1962), Bosnian singer-songwriter
- Edin Džeko (born 1986), Bosnian footballer
- Edin Ferizović (born 1977), Serbian footballer
- Edin Forto (born 1972), Bosnian politician
- Edin Hamidović (born 1993), Swedish footballer
- Edin Husić (born 1985), Bosnian footballer
- Edin Ibrahimović (born 1998), Austrian volleyball player
- Edin Julardžija (born 2001), Croatian footballer
- Edin Junuzović (born 1986), Croatian footballer
- Edin Karamazov (born 1965), Bosnian musician
- Edin Kozica (born 1986), Bosnian footballer
- Edin Krupalija (born 1977), Bosnian bobsledder
- Edin Mujčin (born 1970), Bosnian footballer
- Edin Mujić (born 2001), Bosnian footballer
- Edin Murga (born 1994), Bosnian footballer
- Edin Numankadić (1948–2026), Bosnian visual artist
- Edin Nuredinoski (born 1982), Macedonian footballer
- Edin Omeragić (born 2002), Swiss footballer
- Edin Osmanović (born 1964), Slovenian football player and manager
- Edo Maajka (Edin Osmić, born 1978), Bosnian rapper
- Edin Øy (born 1997), Norwegian footballer
- Edin Pehlić (born 1984), Bosnian footballer
- Edin Pepić (born 1991), German footballer
- Edin Prljača (born 1971), Bosnian football player and manager
- Edin Rahic, German businessman
- Edin Ramčić (born 1970), Bosnian footballer
- Edin Rustemović (born 1993), Bosnian footballer
- Edin Salkić (born 1989), Austrian footballer
- Edin Šaranović (born 1976), Bosnian footballer
- Edin Šehić (born 1995), Bosnian footballer
- Edin Selimović (born 1991), Serbian footballer
- Edin Škorić (born 1975), Serbian volleyball player
- Edin Smajić (born 1971), Bosnian footballer
- Edin Sprečo (1947–2020), Bosnian footballer
- Edin Terzić (born 1982), German-Croatian footballer
- Edin Terzić (alpine skier) (born 1969), Yugoslav alpine skier
- Edin Velez, Puerto Rican video artist, director, and professor
- Edin Višća (born 1990), Bosnian footballer

== Surname ==
- Johan Edin (born 1987), Swedish skier
- Kathryn Edin, American sociologist
- Niklas Edin (born 1985), Swedish curler
- Salah Edin (born 1980), Dutch-Moroccan rapper
