= Hayes =

Hayes may refer to:

- Hayes (surname), including a list of people with the name
  - Rutherford B. Hayes, 19th president of the United States
- Hayes (given name)

== Businesses ==
- Hayes Brake, an American designer and manufacturer of disc brakes
- Hayes Manufacturing Company, a Canadian manufacturer of heavy trucks
- Hayes Microcomputer Products, an American manufacturer of modems

== Football clubs ==
- A.F.C. Hayes, an English football club in Hayes, Hillingdon
- Hayes F.C., a former English football club in Hayes, Hillingdon
- Hayes & Yeading United F.C., an English football club formed from the merger of Hayes F.C. and Yeading F.C.

== Places ==
=== United Kingdom ===
- Hayes, Bromley, London, formerly in Kent
  - Hayes railway station
  - Hayes School
- Hayes, Hillingdon, London, formerly in Middlesex
  - Hayes Town (ward)
  - Hayes & Harlington railway station, historically Hayes station
  - Hayes Urban District, later known as Hayes and Harlington Urban District
- Hayes, Staffordshire, a location
  - Coton Hayes, Stafford borough, Staffordshire
  - Heath Hayes, Cannock Chase district, Staffordshire
- The Hayes, a commercial area in Cardiff, Wales
- Hayes Barton, a farmhouse in East Devon

=== United States ===
- Hayes, California
- Hayes, Louisiana
- Hayes, South Dakota
- Hayes, Wisconsin
- Hayes County, Nebraska
  - Hayes Center, Nebraska, a village
- Hayes State Park, in Michigan
- Hayes Township (disambiguation)
- Hayes Valley, San Francisco, California
- Hayes Volcano, in Alaska
- Hayes Barton Historic District in North Carolina

=== Elsewhere ===
- Hayes, Jamaica
- Hayes, Moselle, France
- Hayes Glacier, in Antarctica
- Hayes Prison Farm, in Tasmania, Australia
- Hayes, Tasmania, Australia
- Hayes River, in Manitoba, Canada, draining into the Hudson Bay
- Hayes River (British Columbia), Canada, entering Teslin Lake
- Presidente Hayes Department, Paraguay
- Lake Hayes, South Island, New Zealand

== See also ==
- Hayes Creek (disambiguation)
- Hayes High School (disambiguation)
- Hayesville (disambiguation)
- Hays (disambiguation)
- Haze (disambiguation)
- Justice Hayes (disambiguation)
- La Haye (disambiguation)
- Hay, cut and dried grass or other plants
- Francesco Hayez (1791–1882), an Italian painter
