= Hayes Township, Nebraska =

Hayes Township, Nebraska may refer to the following places:

- Hayes Township, Custer County, Nebraska
- Hayes Township, Kearney County, Nebraska

== See also ==
- Hayes Township (disambiguation)
