= Aidin (name) =

Aidin, Aidan, Aiden, Adin, Ajdin
- Pronunciation: /ˈeɪdən/, /ˈɑːdɪn/
- Gender: Unisex
- Language: English, Welsh, Persian

Origin
- Languages: Irish, Scottish Gaelic, Welsh, Persian, Hebrew
- Meaning: Holy Light/born of fire/the fiery one/Bright/intelligent/help
- Region of origin: Ireland/Persia

Other names
- Alternative spelling: Adin

Aidin (Persian: آیدین) /ˈaɪdən'/, also spelled Adin (Hebrew: עדין) /ˈɑːdɪn/, is a modern variation of Aidan and several Celtic language names.

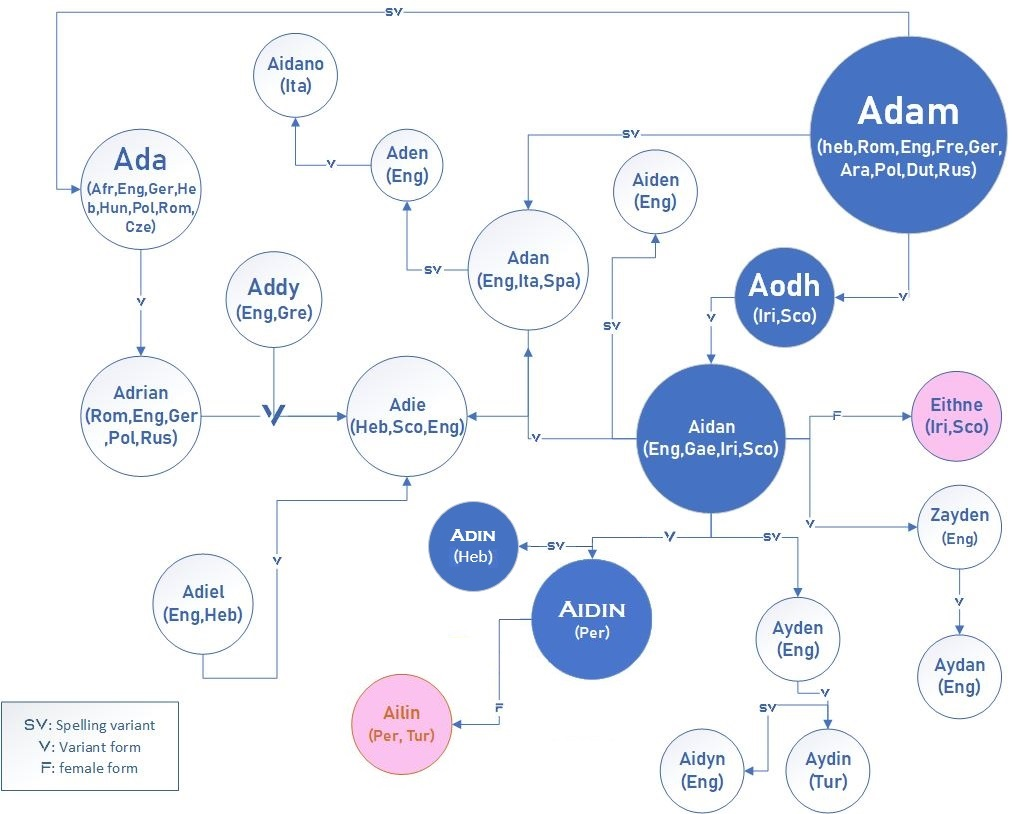

== Meanings ==
- Irish: Little fiery one
- Scottish Gaelic: The fiery one
- Persian: Holy Light
- English: Born of fire
- Hebrew: Could be a form of Adam, meaning "man". Can also be "Lahav" meaning "a flame of fire"
- Turkic Azeri and Turkish: "enlightened" and "bright"

== Related names ==
- Áed, Áedán, Áedh (Ancient Irish)
- Aodhán, Edan Aodhagán (Irish) (Scottish)
- Aidin (Persian)
- Adin (Hebrew)
- Aidan, Aden, Aiden, Aydan, Ayden (English)
- Aidenn, Aideyn, Aideynn, Aodan (Gaelic)
- Aydın (Turkish)
- Ajdin (Bosnian)
- Aidano, Aido, Aidini (Italian)

== Etymology ==
The name Aidin (Adin) is a variation of Aidan, which is derived from the Irish male given name Aodhán, a pet form of Aodh. The personal name Aodh means "fiery" and/or "bringer of fire" and was the name of a Celtic sun god (see Aed).

Other Celtic variants include the Scottish Gaelic given name Aodhàn and the Welsh name Aeddan. The Irish language female equivalent is Aodhnait.

== Popularity ==
Formerly common only in Ireland, Scotland and Wales, the name and its variants have become popular in Europe, the United States, Israel, Persia, Bosnia and Herzegovina, and Canada. Aidan has been the 57th most popular name in the United States since the start of the year 2000, bestowed on over 62,000 boys, while Aiden ranking 66th, has been used on over 51,000 boys. Other variants are less popular, such as Hayden 88th, Ayden 189th, Aden 333rd, Aydan 808th, and Aidin/Aydin 960th, according to the United States Social Security Database. "Aidan/Aiden" was the most popular boys' name in Canada in 2007. Aidan (or any reasonable variant) as a girl's name does not appear in the top one thousand names for girls from the same database, although it has occasionally been used for girls.

== People with the given name ==
- Aidin Aghdashloo (born 1940), Iranian painter
- Aidin Bozorgi (born 1989, disappeared 2013), Iranian mountain climber
- Aidin Elmi (born 1986), Indonesian footballer
- Aidin Mahmutović (born 1986), Bosnian footballer
- Aidin Nikkhah Bahrami (1982–2007), Iranian basketball player

== See also ==
- Adin (given name) and Adin (surname)
- Aodh (given name)
- Aidini
- Adin, California
