= 2009–10 Austrian Cup =

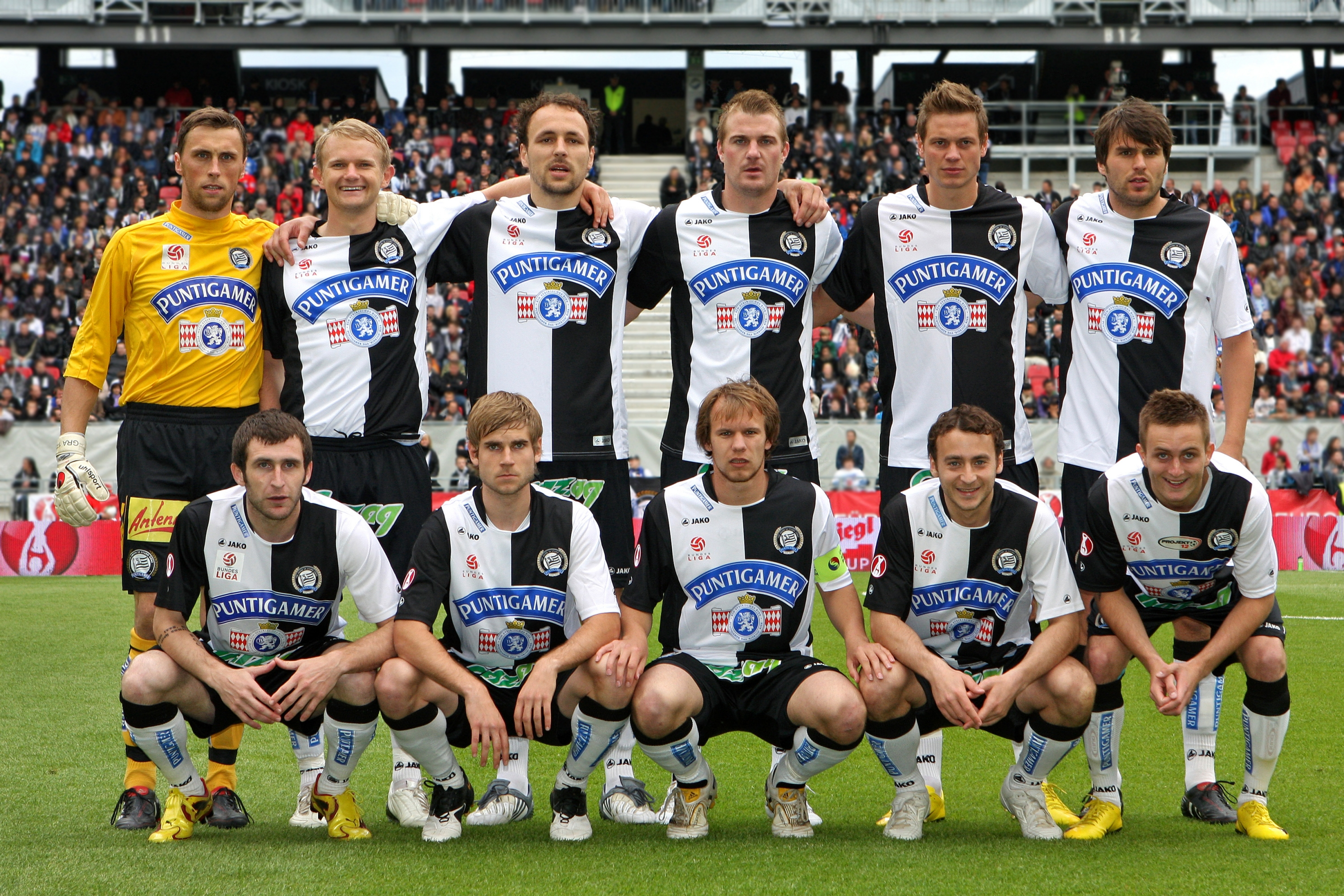
- Sturm Graz were the Austrian Cup champion club for 2009–10.

Tournament details
- Country: Austria

Final positions
- Champions: Sturm Graz
- Runners-up: SC Wiener Neustadt
- UEFA Europa League: Sturm Graz

Tournament statistics
- Top goal scorer: Thomas Stadler (5)

The 2009–10 Austrian Cup (German: ÖFB-Cup, also Stiegl-Cup for sponsoring purposes) was the 76th season of Austria's nationwide football cup competition. It commenced with the matches of the preliminary round in July 2009 and concluded with the Final on 16 May 2010. The winners of the competition, Sturm Graz, qualified for the third qualifying round of the 2010–11 UEFA Europa League.

== Preliminary round ==
The Preliminary Round involved 66 amateur clubs from all regional federations, divided into smaller groups according to the Austrian federal states. The draw for this round was conducted at Franz Horr Stadium in Vienna on 8 July 2009. Thirty-three matches were played between mid-July and 2 August 2009. The winners of these matches advanced to the first round.

Team 1	Score	Team 2
21 July 2009
SV Seekirchen	3–1	TSV Neumarkt
TSV St. Johann	1–1 (a.e.t.) (6–4 p)	USK Anif
24 July 2009
FC Wels	5–1	Union St. Florian
FC St. Veit	2–1	SC St. Stefan
Grazer AK	3–1	DSV Leoben
SV Güssing	0–3	ASK Baumgarten
25 July 2009
SV Allerheiligen	1–0	ASK Voitsberg
26 July 2009
WAC St. Andrä	3–1	VST Völkermarkt
27 July 2009
Austria Kärnten Reserves	0–1	SAK Klagenfurt
28 July 2009
SC Bregenz	1–3	FC Hard
SV Hall	5–0	SPG Axams/Götzens
FC Wacker Innsbruck Reserves	0–2	WSG Wattens
Blau-Weiß Linz	5–1	SG SV Neuhofen/SV Ried Reserves
Sturm Graz Reserves	3–0	SC Kalsdorf
SVL Flavia Solva	4–2	SC Weiz
29 July 2009
SVG Reichenau	6–2	VfB Hohenems
Salzburger AK 1914	1–2 (a.e.t.)	FC Kufstein
KSV Montelaa	3–2	FC Stadlau
31 July 2009
SV Gmunden	5–6 (a.e.t.)	SV Grieskirchen
Vorwärts Steyr	2–1	LASK Reserves
SC Fürstenfeld	3–1	SV Bad Aussee
ASV Schrems	1–4	SK Kottingbrunn
1. SV Wiener Neudorf	2–1	FC Waidhofen/Ybbs
SKU Amstetten	1–1 (a.e.t.) (4–6 p)	SV Horn
SV Oberwart	3–4	Trenkwalder Admira Reserves
UFC Purbach	1–4 (a.e.t.)	SC/ESV Parndorf
SC Neudörfl	0–5	SV Stegersbach
Rennweger SC 1901	1–0 (a.e.t.)	SV Wienerberg
1 August 2009
Union Vöcklamarkt	3–4	SV Sierning
SV Würmla	4–1 (a.e.t.)	1. SC Sollenau
SV Leobendorf	1–3	SC Zwettl
SC Floridsdorf	0–3	FAC Team für Wien
SV Schwechat	2–0	Rapid Vienna Reserves

== First round ==
The draw for this round was conducted on 4 August 2009. The draw involved the 33 winners of the preliminary round, the 22 professional teams from the 2009–10 Bundesliga and First League, and nine regional cup winners. The matches of this round were played on 14 and 15 August 2009.

Team 1	Score	Team 2
14 August 2009
Trenkwalder Admira Reserves	2–0	SV Mattersburg
SV Horn	2–2 (a.e.t.) (6–7 p)	Austria Wien Reserves
SC Zwettl	2–4	TSV Hartberg
SK Austria Kärnten	1–0	SC Rheindorf Altach
SV Sierning	0–2	FC Lustenau 07
Blau-Weiß Linz	3–2	SKN St. Pölten
SV Seekirchen	0–1	First Vienna FC
SV Schwechat	0–1	SC Austria Lustenau
SV Grieskirchen	1–3	SC Wiener Neustadt
Sturm Graz Reserves	3–1	Kapfenberger SV
ASV Zurndorf	2–3	FC Dornbirn
SV Allerheiligen	2–0	FC Hard
SV Stegersbach	2–4	SVL Flavia Solva
SC Schwarz	0–3	WSG Wattens
Grazer AK	5–0	FC Gleisdorf 09
SAK Klagenfurt	2–1	WAC St. Andrä
FAC Team für Wien	3–1	SC Fürstenfeld
15 August 2009
TSV St. Johann	2–4 (a.e.t.)	SK Sturm Graz
Vorwärts Steyr	1–7	FC Red Bull Salzburg
Rennweger SC 1901	2–4	SAK Klagenfurt
SC/ESV Parndorf	2–3 (a.e.t.)	SK Rapid Wien
SV Würmla	0–4	FK Austria Wien
FC Wels	0–3	SV Ried
ASK Baumgarten	1–6	Red Bull Salzburg Reserves
Post SV Fußball	1–4	LASK Linz
FC Kufstein	1–2	Wacker Innsbruck
SV Gaflenz	1–4	FC Gratkorn
KSV Montelaa	0–5	FC Trenkwalder Admira
SVG Reichenau	5–3 (a.e.t.)	1. SV Wiener Neudorf
FC Viktoria 62 Bregenz	1–3 (a.e.t.)	SV Grödig
SV Lendorf	1–2	FC St. Veit
SV Hall	0–2	SK Kottingbrunn

== Second round ==
This round involved the 32 winners from the first round. These matches were played on 19 September 2009.

Team 1	Score	Team 2
18 September 2009
SK Kottingbrunn	1–3	LASK Linz
FC Pasching	2–2 (a.e.t.) (2–4 p)	SC Wiener Neustadt
Grazer AK	0–2^{1}	FC Lustenau 07
SVL Flavia Solva	1–3	SC Austria Lustenau
SV Allerheiligen	1–2	SK Austria Kärnten
Blau-Weiß Linz	2–2 (a.e.t.) (5–4 p)	Austria Wien Reserves
Sturm Graz Reserves	1–2	SV Ried
Trenkwalder Admira Reserves	0–2	First Vienna FC
Red Bull Salzburg Reserves	2–2 (a.e.t.) (3–5 p)	FC Gratkorn
FC Dornbirn	3–1 (a.e.t.)	TSV Hartberg
19 September 2009
SVG Reichenau	1–4	Wacker Innsbruck
SAK Klagenfurt	1–3	FC Trenkwalder Admira
20 September 2009
FC St. Veit	1–7	SK Rapid Wien
FAC Team für Wien	0–6	FK Austria Wien
SV Grödig	0–1	FC Red Bull Salzburg
WSG Wattens	0–1	SK Sturm Graz

^{1}This match was abandoned in the 77th minute due to Grazer AK fans storming the pitch.

== Third round ==
This round involved the 16 winners from the previous round. The matches were played on 9 and 10 March 2010.

Team 1	Score	Team 2
10 February 2010
SK Sturm Graz	2–0	FC Red Bull Salzburg
9 March 2010
Wacker Innsbruck	0–1	SC Austria Lustenau
LASK Linz	1–0	FK Austria Wien
SK Austria Kärnten	3–2	First Vienna FC
FC Dornbirn	0–2	SV Ried
FC Trenkwalder Admira	0–0 (a.e.t.) (4–2 p)	FC Gratkorn
FC Lustenau 07	1–3	SC Wiener Neustadt
10 March 2010
Blau-Weiß Linz	1–2	SK Rapid Wien

== Quarter-finals ==
This round involved the eight winners from the previous round. These matches were played on 30 and 31 March 2010.

30 March 2010	SK Sturm Graz	1–0 (a.e.t.)	FC Admira Wacker Mödling	Graz
19:00	Jantscher 118'	Report		Stadium: UPC-Arena; Attendance: 6,759; Referee: Bernhard Brugger

31 March 2010	SK Austria Kärnten	3–2	SK Rapid Wien	Klagenfurt
18:15	Kaufmann 40'; Jelavić 56' (o.g.); Hierländer 76'	Report	Heikkinen 44'; Trimmel 54'	Stadium: Hypo Group Arena; Attendance: 2,997; Referee: Thomas Gangl

31 March 2010	SC Wiener Neustadt	2–1 (a.e.t.)	LASK	Wiener Neustadt
19:00	Aigner 90+2'; Grünwald 100'	Report	Kragl 48'	Stadium: Stadion Wiener Neustadt; Attendance: 1,000; Referee: Thomas Prammer

31 March 2010	SV Ried	1–1 (a.e.t.) (4–2 p)	SC Austria Lustenau	Ried im Innkreis
19:00	Drechsel 50'	Report	Salkić 89'	Stadium: Keine Sorgen Arena; Attendance: 1,900; Referee: Manfred Krassnitzer
	Penalties
	Drechsel (penalty scored); Mader (penalty missed); Sturm (penalty scored); Brenner (penalty scored); Stocklasa (penalty scored)		Sobkova (penalty scored); Salomon (penalty scored); Kampel (penalty missed); Salkić (penalty missed)

== Semi-finals ==
This round involved the four winners from the previous round. These matches took place on 20 and 21 April 2010.

20 April 2010	SK Austria Kärnten	0–4	SC Wiener Neustadt	Klagenfurt
19:00		Report	Grünwald 18'; Wolf 33'; Sadović 45'; Viana 80'	Stadium: Hypo Group Arena; Attendance: 4,070; Referee: Rene Eisner

21 April 2010	SV Ried	0–1	SK Sturm Graz	Ried
18:15		Report	Lavrič 19'	Stadium: Keine Sorgen Arena; Attendance: 3,500; Referee: Bernhard Brugger

== Final ==
16 May 2010
16:30

SC Wiener Neustadt	0–1	SK Sturm Graz
		Lavrič 81'

Hypo-Arena, Klagenfurt
Attendance: 28,000
Referee: Gerhard Grobelnik

== See also ==
- 2009–10 Bundesliga
- 2009–10 First League
