= Aidan Cross =

Aidan Cross may refer to:

- Aidan Cross (priest)
- Aidan Cross (rugby union)
