= Aodh (given name) =

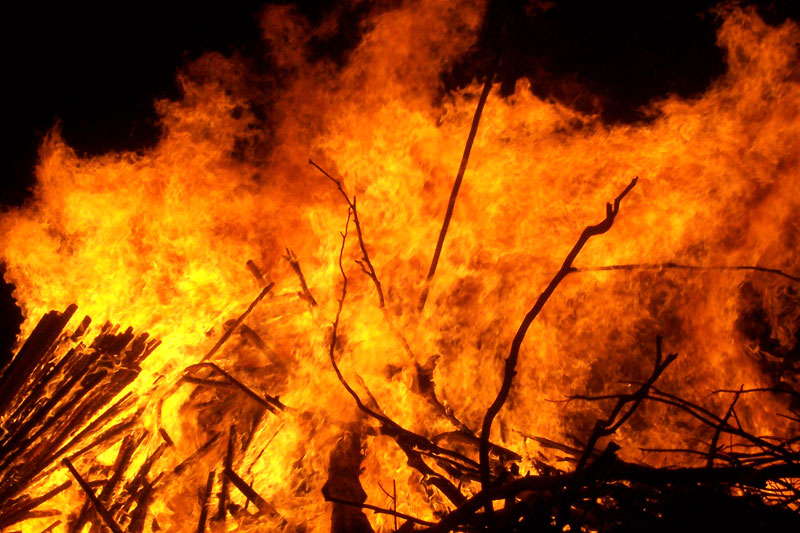
- Pronunciation: English: /iː, eɪ/ ee, ay Irish: [iː, eː] Scottish Gaelic: [ɯː]
- Gender: Masculine
- Language: Irish, Scottish Gaelic

Other gender
- Feminine: Aodhnait, Aodhamair

Origin
- Language: Old Irish
- Origin: áed
- Meaning: 'fire'

Other names
- Anglicisation: Hugh
- Derived: Aodhán, Aogán

Aodh (/iː, eɪ/ ee, ay, Irish: [iː, eː], Scottish Gaelic: [ɯː]; Old Irish: Áed) is a masculine Irish and Scottish Gaelic given name, which was traditionally anglicized as Hugh. The name means 'fire' and was the name of a god in Irish mythology.

The name features in the Irish surnames Mac Aodha (lit. 'son of Aodh'; anglicized as McGee/McHugh/McKee) and Ó hAodha (lit. 'descendant of Aodh'; anglicized as Hayes/Hughes/O'Hea), and the Scottish surname Mac Aoidh ('son of Aodh'; anglicized McKay).

The name has a number of derived forms, including:

- The feminine forms Aodhnait and Aodhamair.
- Aodhán (Old Irish: Aedán), anglicized as Aidan, formed by the addition of the diminutive suffix -án.
- Aogán (traditionally Aodhagán), a double diminutive. This form features in the surname Mac Aodhagáin ('son of Aodhagán'; anglicized as Egan and Keegan).
- Maodhóg (Old Irish: Máedóc), anglicized as Mogue, derived from the pet form m'Aodhóg ('my little Aodh').

== People with the name ==
=== Áed ===
- Áed Rúad, legendary High king of Ireland
- Áed mac Echach (died 575), king of Connacht
- Áed mac Bricc (died 587), bishop and saint
- Áed Dub mac Suibni (died 588), king of Dál nAraidi
- Áed Dibchine (died c.595), king of Leinster
- Áed mac Ainmuirech (died c.598), High king of Ireland
- Áed Sláine (died 604), High king of Ireland
- Áed Rón mac Cathail (died 604), king in Leinster
- Áed Uaridnach (died 612), High king of Ireland
- Áed Bennán mac Crimthainn (died 618), king of or in Munster
- Áed Dub mac Colmáin (died 641?), bishop of Kildare
- Áed Aired (died 698), king of Dál nAraide
- Áed Róin (died 735), king of Dál Fiatach
- Áed mac Colggen (died 738), king of Leinster
- Áed Balb mac Indrechtaig (died 742), king of Connacht
- Áed Muinderg (died 747), king of northern Uí Néill
- Áed Find (died 778), king of Dál Riata
- Áed Oirdnide (died 819), king of Ailech
- Áed mac Boanta (died 839), probably king in Dál Riata
- Áed of Scotland (died 878), king of the Picts
- Áed Findliath (died 879), king of Ailech
- Áed Ua Crimthainn (fl. mid-12th century), abbot of Terryglass

=== Aedh ===
- Aedh mac Cathal Crobdearg Ua Conchobair, king of Connacht, 1223–1228
- Aedh Muimhnech mac Felim Ua Conchobair, king of Connacht
- Aedh mac Ruaidri Ua Conchobair, king of Connacht, 1228–1233
- Aedh mac Aedh Breifneach Ua Conchobair
- Áed Ua hOissín, First Archbishop of Tuam 1152

=== Aodh ===
- Aodh, Earl of Ross (died 1333)
- Aodh Mór Ó Néill (1540–1616), Irish earl and resistance leader
- Aodh Mac Cathmhaoil (1571–1626), Irish archbishop and theologian
- Aodh Rua Ó Domhnaill (1572–1601), Irish King, Lord and rebel leader
- Aodh Mac Dónaill (Hugh McDonnell), Irish scribe

=== Aodhagan, Aodhagán, Aodhán, Aogán ===
All of these variants are /ˌeɪ.əˈɡɔːn/ AY-ə-GAWN or /eɪˈɡɔːn/ ay-GAWN. The spelling Aogán reflects the loss of the light dha syllable, pronounced [ə], but the o may be reinterpreted as [ə] even in that spellinɡ.

- Aodhagan O'Neill (born 1959), Irish darts player
- Aogán Ó Rathaille (1670–1728), Irish language poet
- Aodhán Ó Ríordáin (born 1976), Irish politician

== See also ==
- Aidan (name)
- Hayes (given name)
- Hayes (surname)
- List of Irish-language given names
- Ó hAodha
