= Salkić =

Salkić (Bosnian pronunciation: [sǎːlkitɕ]) is a Bosnian surname. Notable people with the surname include:

- Edin Salkić (born 1989), Austrian and Bosnian footballer
- Erik Salkić (born 1987), Slovenian footballer of Bosnian descent
- Mervana Jugić-Salkić (born 1980), Bosnian former tennis player
