= Gadin =

Gadin is a surname. Notable people with the surname include:

- Daniel Pérez Gadín (21st century), Argentinian accountant
- Philip Palet Gadin (21st century), South Sudanese politician

== See also ==
- Kadin (name)
- Radin
