= Hayes Creek (disambiguation) =

Hayes Creek is a river in the United States of America.

Hayes Creek may also refer to.

- Hayes Creek (British Columbia), a water course in Canada
- Hayes Creek, New Zealand, a populated place in Queenstown-Lakes District
- Hayes Creek, a populated place in Northern Territory, Australia

== See also ==
- Hayes (disambiguation)
