= Hayes (given name) =

- Gender: unisex

Origin
- Origin: English or Irish
- Meaning: from English place name meaning “fence” or “”enclosure” or an Irish surname meaning “descendant of Aodh.”

Other names
- See also: Aidan, Aodh, Hugh

Hayes is a given name of English or Irish origin that is a transferred use of a place name or surname. The English place name is derived from an Old English word that meant fence or enclosure. The Irish surname means “descendant of Aodh.”

Hayes has risen in popularity in recent years as a given name for newborn boys in the United States, where it first ranked among the top 1,000 names for boys in 2009 and has ranked among the top 300 names for newborn boys since 2019. The name is also in occasional use for girls in the United States. The popularity of the name coincides with the increasing popularity in the United States of other surname names and other names that end in the letter "s".

== See also ==
- Hayes (disambiguation)
- Hayes (surname)
