= Adin (given name) =

Male given name

- Gender: Male

Other gender
- Feminine: Adina

Origin
- Meaning: Everlasting bliss, leader, handsome, delight, faith

Other names
- Variant form: Edin

Adin is a male given name.

In the Balkans, Adin is popular among Bosniaks in the former Yugoslav nations. In this region, the name is derived from the Arabic word دين (din), meaning faith. The name is also used as a modification of Edin. Adin was the 4th most popular boys' name in Bosnia and Herzegovina in 2014. This region also has a female equivalent: Adina (for example, Adina Giurgiu).

== Given name ==
- Adin Ballou (1803–1890), American cleric and activist
- Adin Brown, American soccer player and coach
- Adin Bukva, Swedish footballer playing in Italy
- Adin B. Capron (1841–1911), American miller and politician
- Adin Džafić (born 1989), Bosnian footballer
- Adin Falkoff (1921–2010), American engineer and computer scientist
- Adin Hill (born 1996), Canadian ice hockey goaltender
- Adin P. Hobart (1822–1881), American politician in Wisconsin
- Adin Huntington (born 2002), American football player
- Adin Mulaosmanović (born 1977), Bosnian footballer
- Adin Randall (1829–1868), American businessman
- Adin Ross (born 2000), American Twitch streamer
- Adin Steinsaltz (1937–2020), Israeli rabbi and scholar
- Adin Talbar (1921–2013), German-born Israeli diplomat and athlete
- Adin Thayer (1816–1890), American politician from New York
- Adin Ballou Underwood (1828–1888), American Union Army general
- Adin Vrabac (born 1994), Bosnian basketball player
- Adin Williams (born 2000), American para swimmer

== See also ==
- Aidin (name)
- Aydın (name)
