= Tarlach Rua Mac Dónaill =

Irish poet

- Writing career
- Genre: Poetry

Tarlach Rua Mac Dónaill (fl. early 18th century) was an Irish poet.

Tarlach Rua Mac Dónaill was from the townland of Derrylasky in the parish of Donaghmore, County Tyrone, and lived in the first half of the 18th century. He was the author of Seachrán Charn tSiadhail, which became extremely popular in Gaelic Ulster. It survived in numerous oral traditions, two manuscripts, and versions run to over fifty seven verses of eight lines each. The original probably was no more than six. Seachrán Charn tSiadhail describes a young man attempting to impress a young girl with an account of all the professions he has held and all the places he has visited.

According to Aodh Mac Dónaill, Tarlach Rua

"... was shot at the age of 23 by a party of soldiers of Altmore barracks. A remarkable event happened at his death. The old man, his father, came to bring home the corpse of his son. He had an ash twig in his hand and while collecting his son's brains in his cap, he struck the twig in the ground, and forgetting all about it went away carrying his son's corpse. The twig budded and grew into a very large tree. In sixty years it covered a square perch."
