= Hayes Township =

Hayes Township may refer to:

== Iowa ==
- Hayes Township, Buena Vista County, Iowa
- Hayes Township, Crawford County, Iowa
- Hayes Township, Ida County, Iowa

== Kansas ==
- Hayes Township, Clay County, Kansas
- Hayes Township, Dickinson County, Kansas
- Hayes Township, Franklin County, Kansas
- Hayes Township, McPherson County, Kansas
- Hayes Township, Mitchell County, Kansas, in Mitchell County, Kansas
- Hayes Township, Reno County, Kansas, in Reno County, Kansas
- Hayes Township, Stafford County, Kansas, in Stafford County, Kansas

== Michigan ==
- Hayes Township, Charlevoix County, Michigan
- Hayes Township, Clare County, Michigan
- Hayes Township, Otsego County, Michigan

== Minnesota ==
- Hayes Township, Swift County, Minnesota

== Nebraska ==
- Hayes Township, Custer County, Nebraska
- Hayes Township, Kearney County, Nebraska
