= Kaden (name) =

Name list

Kaden is a given name, a variant spelling of Caden, as well as a surname.

== People with the given name ==
- Kaden Davis (born 1998), American football player
- Kaden Elliss (born 1995), American football player
- Kaden Feagin (born 2004), American college football player
- Kaden Fulcher (born 1998), Canadian ice hockey player
- Kaden Groves (born 1998), Australian cyclist
- Kaden Herchenroether (born 2005), American sledge hockey player
- Kaden Hensel (born 1986), Australian tennis player
- Kaden Honeycutt (born 2003), American racing driver
- Kaden Hopkins (born 2000), Bermudian cyclist
- Kaden Prather (born 2002), American football player
- Kaden Rodney (born 2004), English footballer
- Kaden Smith (born 1997), American football player
- Kaden Wetjen (born 2002), American football player

== People with the surname ==
- Allison Kaden (born 1977), American reporter
- André Kaden (born 1978), German figure skater
- Lewis B. Kaden (1942–2020), American businessman
- Lilly Kaden (born 2001), German sprinter
- Richard Kaden (1856–1932), German violinist
- Ulli Kaden (born 1959), German boxer

== See also ==
- Caden (given name)
