= McGlincy murders =

Mass murder in Campbell, California

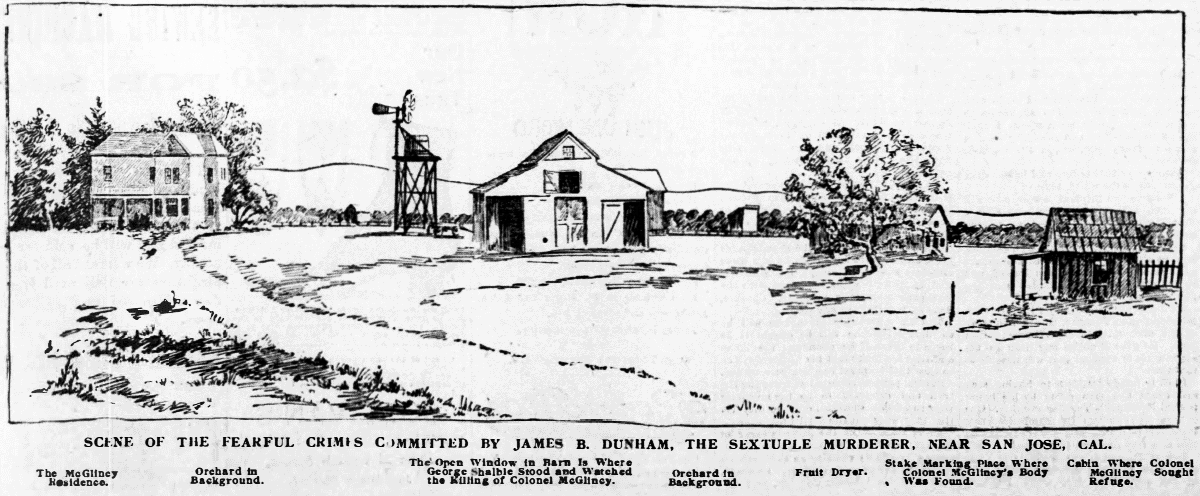
- Location: Campbell, California, United States
- Date: May 26, 1896 c. 10:00 p.m. – c. 11:00 p.m.
- Target: McGlincy family
- Weapons: Axe.38-caliber revolver.45-caliber revolver
- Deaths: 6 (3 by gunshot, 2 by axe, 1 by strangulation)
- Perpetrator: James Dunham

On May 26, 1896, six members of the McGlincy household, consisting of four family members and two servants, were murdered in Campbell, California, United States. The perpetrator, James Dunham, is thought to have targeted his wife and family-in-law, but he disappeared during the intense, ensuing manhunt and never has been positively identified since then.

== Background ==
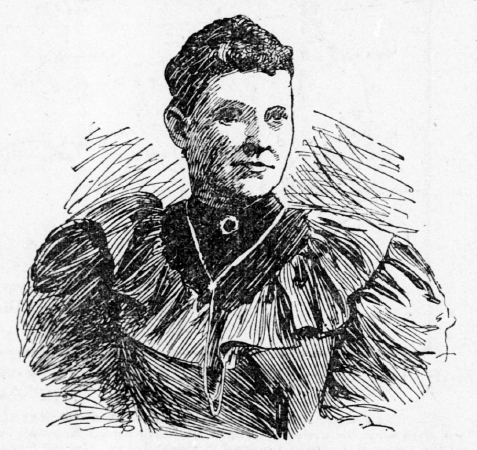
Ada Wells McGlincy

=== McGlincy-Wells family ===
Ada Wells had been a schoolteacher; her husband, Oscar C. Wells, retired from military service, had come to California in 1867 for his health and died in 1883. They owned the orchard in Campbell. She married Richard McGlincy in 1889 or 1890.

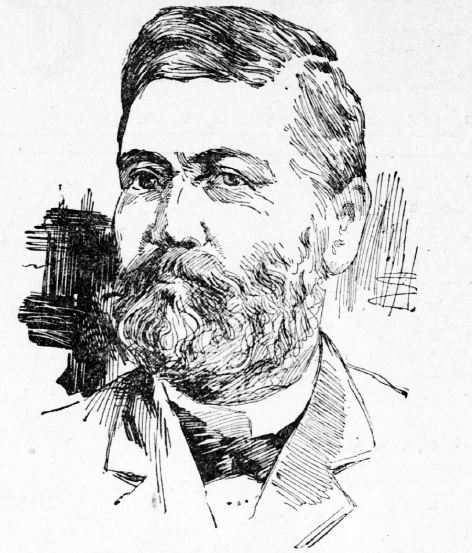
Col. Richard McGlincy

Colonel Richard McGlincy arrived in California around 1888 and held several public offices there, including Deputy Assessor of Santa Clara County, after retiring from service in the Confederate Army. He lived on the 54-acre (22 ha) orchard approximately 1 1/2 mi (2.4 km) south of Campbell with his wife, Ada Wells, her two adult children, Hattie and James, and several servants.

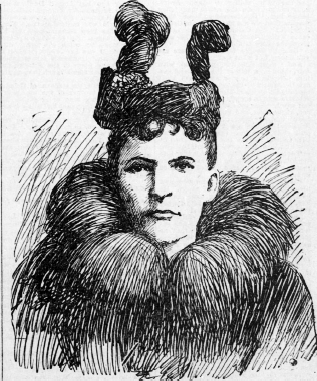
Hattie Wells Dunham

His stepdaughter, Hattie Wells, once was engaged to be married to Charles Dunham, the younger brother of James Dunham. However, she married James instead in 1895 and they lived together with the McGlincys. She was a graduate of the California State Normal School and gave birth to their son Percy Osborne on May 4.

=== James Dunham ===
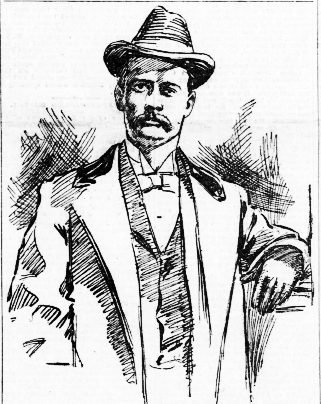
James Dunham

James C. Dunham was not highly regarded; at the time of his marriage to Hattie, he was undergoing a divorce from a young lady with whom he had eloped recently. After the murders, newspapers asserted he "[had] done nothing toward the support of his wife" since their marriage; contemporary coverage noted he had started a short-lived bicycle business in Stockton and worked as a foreman in his father-in-law's fruit orchards. The couple were both bicyclists, having ridden together from Stockton to Sacramento in August 1895. In Sacramento, after Hattie's jewelry was stolen, investigators concluded that Dunham had pawned the items while she slept. Most recently, he had enrolled at Santa Clara College aged 30, enrolling in a four-year course in the classics starting in February 1896, with the stated intention to pursue a career in law afterwards.

== Murders in May ==
On Monday, May 25, Dunham withdrew his life's savings from the bank, approximately $1,000, and the next day hid a bicycle in the brush by the dry creek bed, a few hundred yards from the house. Contemporary news coverage called these actions premeditation.

=== May 26–27, 1896 ===
Using an axe and two revolvers, Dunham murdered six people that night:

- Hattie Wells Dunham (26), his wife
- Minnie Schlesser (28), a household servant
- Ada Wells McGlincy (53), his mother-in-law
- James Wells (22), his brother-in-law
- Robert Brisco (30), a household servant
- Colonel Richard Parran McGlincy (56), his stepfather-in-law

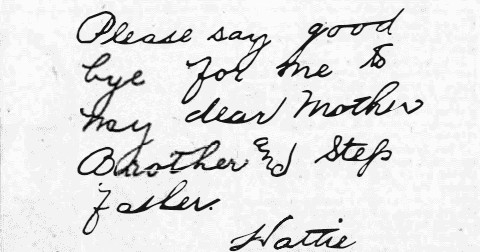
Hattie's note

On the night of May 26, Col. McGlincy left the house for a few hours to attend a meeting of the American Protective Association with his stepson, James Wells, and one of the farmhands, George Schaible. Investigators believe that Dunham did not arrive until around 10 PM that night, when the remaining occupants were getting ready for bed. First, he gagged and strangled his wife, Hattie Wells, then killed the servant Minnie Schlessler with an ax blow to the head as she rushed in from her adjoining room upon hearing the racket. A holographic note was found next to Hattie's bed, which read "Please say good bye for me to my dear mother brother and step father", implying that she had been given a short time to prepare for her death, although there is suspicion that Dunham prepared it himself. He took the ax downstairs and killed Ada Wells McGlincy, Hattie's mother; according to the coroner's inquest, one blow each from the ax was sufficient to kill Schlessler and McGlincy, but he had continued to crush their skulls with several more strikes.

Afterwards, he went through the house and took all the photographs of himself, certain papers, and two revolvers, a .38 and a .45; the one tintype photograph he left was later used on the reward poster. Two men "entirely oblivious of the noiseless tragedy which had taken place" came to the orchard that night to steal cherries; they later recalled that while watching the house for any sign they had been seen, they saw the lights go out and then, ten minutes later, Dunham came out to smoke a cigarette while sitting on the porch.

When McGlincy returned with James Wells and Schaible around 11 PM or midnight, McGlincy instructed Schaible to open the barn and throw down some hay for the animals stabled inside. As Schaible was finishing these last chores, he heard gunshots from the main house and hid himself in the hayloft, watching the scenes unfold. After McGlincy had opened the front door, Dunham, lying in wait, had struck him a glancing blow on the head with the ax. Wells, following behind McGlincy, began a short struggle with Dunham that ended when Dunham drew his revolver and slew him with it; the disorder in the entry hall bore mute witness to the ferocity which ceased with the five bullets found in Wells. Meanwhile, McGlincy's hat had cushioned the ax blow somewhat, and upon recovering his wits, he ran through the house and escaped through a rear window, shouting for help as he headed towards the barn and a shack where the hired men slept.

McGlincy was able to reach the shack and held the door closed before Dunham arrived, calling out "Come out, Mac; come out, I want to see you. ... I am bound to have you, anyhow. Bob [Brisco], come out here; I want you too, and you, too, Schaible." The wounded McGlincy offered a defiant response: "I won't come out, Jim; I have two bullets in me now. Put up your revolver." Dunham fired the revolver blindly twice into the cabin door. As Brisco jumped out the cabin's back window and began running away, Dunham ran off in pursuit and shot him twice; McGlincy took advantage of the brief distraction and started back towards the house, but had made only twenty paces before Dunham returned and killed him with a final shot to the heart.

=== Survivors ===
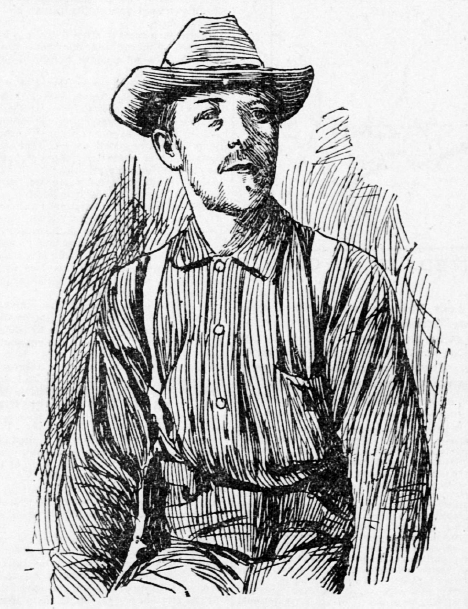
George Schaible

The survivors were Dunham's and Hattie's 3-week-old son and a farmhand, George Schaible, who had hidden in the barn during the massacre. Dunham had assumed that Schaible was already resting in the cabin with Brisco, and after checking the cabin for him, entered the barn and ascended the ladder, where Dunham struck a match, looking for Schaible, who was crouched in the hay loft. However, Dunham failed to spot Schaible and left soon afterwards, taking a horse from the barn.

Dunham's motives are unknown. According to an acquaintance of Dunham's, he may have killed everyone in the family to ensure his son would have an uncontested claim to the farm. However, it was discovered later that Col. McGlincy had an unmarried sister working in government service.

== Manhunt ==
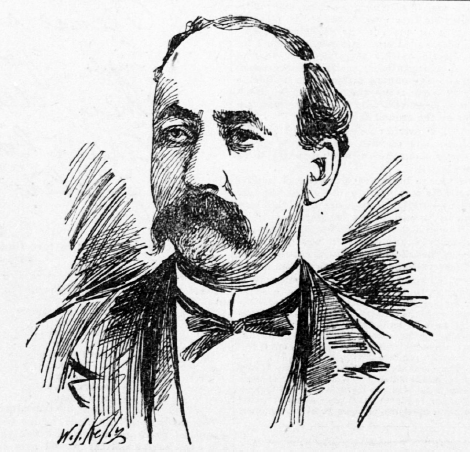
Santa Clara County Sheriff J.H. Lyndon

Although investigators conducted an extensive manhunt throughout Santa Clara County, California, Dunham was never found and the case remains officially open. The hunt was fueled by a promised US$11,000 (equivalent to $426,000 in 2025) reward for his capture, dead or alive.

On May 28, he was spotted on the road to Mount Hamilton with a "badly scratched" face and feet inexplicably shod in gunnysacks, but heavy fog prevented his arrest that night. "Patchen", the horse he had stolen from the farm for his escape, was found in Indian Gulch on the morning of May 29, formed by Smith Creek. The manhunt also had found pieces of Dunham's clothing as well as recent campfires. There was evidence that Dunham had broken into a cabin and was still present near Mount Hamilton on May 30. However, because "a shot was distinctly heard shortly after the finding of the horse, and ... no one can be found who fired that shot" and "the buzzards ... keep up their circling over one particular place in [Indian Gulch]" it was thought that Dunham had died by suicide, although his body had not been found.

On June 1, it was reported that Dunham had purchased supplies and the manhunt began anew. A rifle and pistol were stolen from a cabin in Glenwood, giving rise to theories that Dunham had escaped from Mount Hamilton and was continuing south. On June 2, the sheriffs' posse took a train to Hollister, pursuing news overnight that Dunham had been spotted heading for Quién Sabe Valley; they thought he was moving by night and seeking help from Mexican communities that were not aware of his crimes. The next sighting was at Hayes Station on June 4, by a pedestrian who "knew nothing of Dunham, but without being questioned gave them all the details regarding clothes, shoes and hat". At that point, it was believed he was seeking shelter from friends in Tulare County; a rancher near Merced believed he had shared a meal with Dunham, which turned out to be a false accusation.

By June 7, the pursuit was being discontinued; some thought he had never made it as far as Fresno County. It was believed that he effected at least part of his escape via bicycle rather than horse, as was common during that time period; Dunham was a long-distance cyclist, and a horse believed to be the one he used to make his initial escape, stolen from James Wells, was found a day and a half after the murders. A bicyclist matching his description was reported as arriving in Bakersfield on the morning of May 29.

=== Mysterious fate ===
Rumors have persisted that he escaped to Cuba or Mexico.

Multiple men have been arrested after being misidentified as Dunham. In early June 1896, a man reported as Dunham had asked for food near San Miguel, which turned out to be a different outlaw. Another suspect was arrested in 1897 in Mexico based on a cursory description; he was cleared of suspicion. In 1901, Charles Franklin Crill was arrested in Wichita, Kansas, and brought to San Jose, suspected of being Dunham. The next year, Dunham was claimed to be living among the Navajo. After a shootout in Arizona, a man was arrested in September 1904; after being told his wounds were fatal, he confessed to being Dunham. In September 1908, a Texas man was identified as Dunham; William Hatfield was brought to San Jose and released in November after a preliminary hearing.

As the trail grew cold, many of the searchers believed he had died by suicide. Skeletal remains have been examined to see if they had come from Dunham, starting in 1898. Similar stories followed in the ensuing years, including the discovery of bones in the Pacheco Pass area, at least one set which disappeared, possibly in hopes of securing the reward. These examinations persisted for at least 40 years.

Several discredited alternate theories have been advanced, postulating that Dunham had been killed to draw the blame from the real murderer(s).

== Aftermath ==
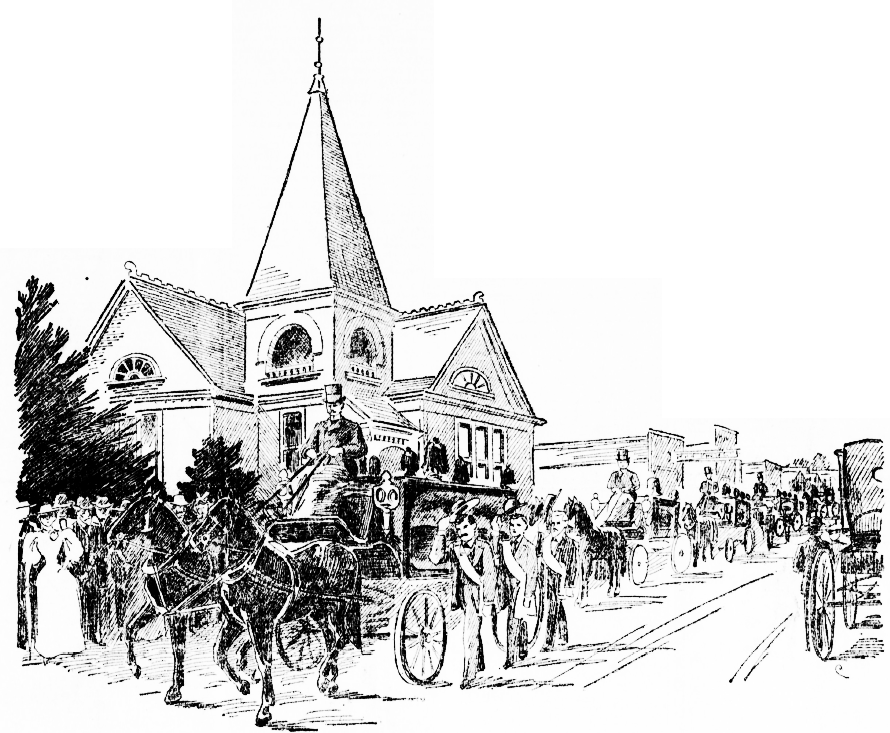
Funeral cortege arrives at Campbell Congregational Church, May 29

The funeral for the four members of the McGlincy-Wells family was held on May 29; one of the floral offerings from the Independent Order of Odd Fellows quoted Romans 12:19: "Vengeance is mine, I will repay, saith the Lord." They were buried at Oak Hill Cemetery in a family plot with Oscar Wells and Robert Brisco; five of the six headstones (all save Oscar's) echo that verse: "Vengeance" (Brisco) "is mine" (McGlincy) "I will repay" (Ada Wells) "saith" (Hattie) "the Lord" (James).

The infant Percy Osborne Brewer (née Dunham) was adopted by Mrs. M. T. Brewer in San Francisco, a sister of Ada Wells McGlincy.

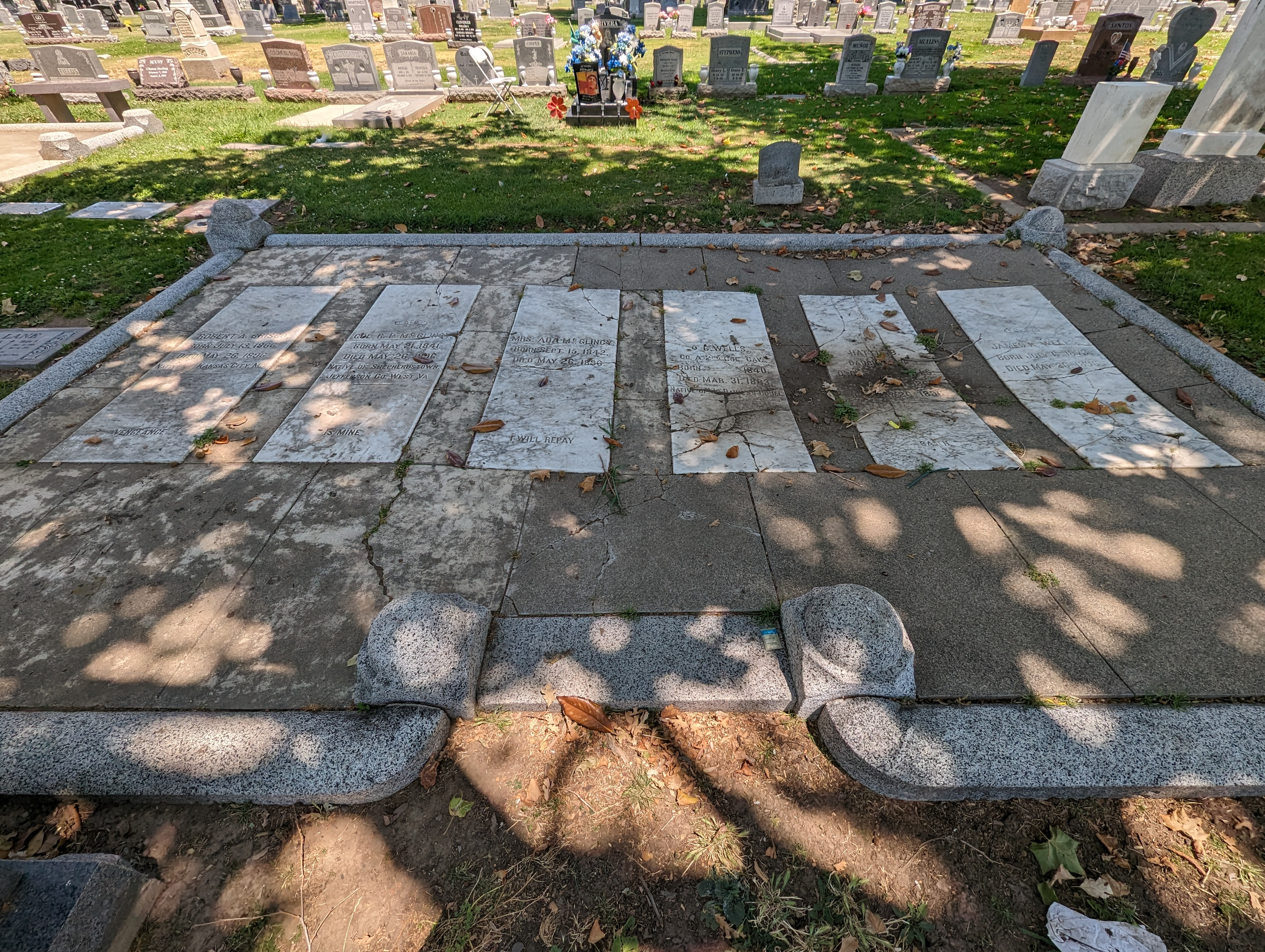
Headstones for the victims of the Mcglincy Massacre at Oak Hill Memorial Park

The McGlincy house remained until the 1960s when it was torn down by the owner, Steve Veitenheimer, who owned the last parcel of McGlincy's orchard. The house was approximately where the end of Veitenheimer Lane is today.
