= Caden (given name) =

Name list

- Pronunciation: KAY-den /ˈt͡ʃa.dɛn/
- Gender: Unisex
- Language: English

Origin
- Language: English
- Origin: Arabic; Celtic
- Meaning: Companion or friend (Arabic) son of Cadán (Irish)

Other names
- Variant forms: Cadan, Caedan, Caeden, Caedon, Caedyn, Caiden, Caidon, Caidyn, Caydan, Cayden, Kadan, Kaden, Kadeen, Kadein, Kaedan, Kaeden, Kaedin, Kaedon, Kaedyn, Kaiden, Kaidin, Kaydan, Kayden, Kaidyn

Caden is a given name in English-speaking countries that is most commonly used for males. It rose in popularity in the early 2000s due to the popularity of similar-sounding names, such as Aidan, Braden, Hayden, and Jadon.

== Origin ==
=== Etymology ===
The name has debated etymology but may be derived from the Irish surname Caden, which is an anglicized form of Mac Cadáin, meaning "son of Cadán" in Irish Gaelic.

=== Spelling and derivatives ===
The name has several alternative spellings.

==== Arabic derivatives ====
In the Arabic language the name usually begins with the letter K and is spelled as Kaden, Kadeen, Kadein, Kadin, Kadyn, Kaeden, Kaedin, Kaedon, Kaedyn, Kaidan, Kaiden, Kaidin, Kaydan and Kayden, Khaden.

==== English and Celtic derivatives ====
In English and Celtic languages the name can begin with either the Letter C or K and is spelled as Cadan, Caedan, Caden, Caedon, Caedyn, Caydn, Caiden, Cadon, Caidon, Caydan, Cayden, Kadan, Kaden, Kadeen, Kadein, Kadin, Kadyn, Kaedan, Kaeden, Kaedin, Kaedon, Kaedyn, Kaidan, Kaiden, Kyden, Kaidin, Kaydan and Kayden. In the U.S., the spelling Kayden charted for girls in the 2000s and 2010s.

== People named Caden ==
- Caden Barnett (born 2003), American football player
- Caden Nicol (born 2002), Irish pole dancer
- Caden Bodine (born 2003), American baseball player
- Caden Clark (born 2003), American soccer player
- Caden Cox (born 1999), American college football player
- Caden Cunningham (born 2003), British taekwondo practitioner
- Caden Curry (born 2003), American football player
- Caden Dana (born 2003), American baseball player
- Caden Davis (defensive end) (born 2004), American football player
- Caden Davis (placekicker) (born 2001), American football player
- Caden Dowler (born 2003), American football player
- Caden Durham (born 2006), American football player
- Caden Glauber (born 2008), American baseball player
- Caden Glover (born 2007), American soccer player
- Caden Grice (born 2002), American baseball player
- Caden Kelly (born 2003), English footballer
- Caden Manson (born 1972), American art director
- Caden McLoughlin (born 2005), Costa Rican footballer
- Caden Pierce (born 2003), American basketball player
- Caden Prieskorn (born 1999), American football player
- Caden Shields (born 1988), New Zealand runner
- Caden Stafford (born 2003), American soccer player
- Caden Sterns (born 1999), American football player
- Caden Tomy (born 2001), Canadian soccer player
- Caden Veltkamp (born 2003), American football player
- Caden VerMaas (born 2006), American football player

== See also ==
- Kaden (name)
