= Kadin (name) =

Kadin is both a given name and a surname. Notable people with the name include:

Given name

- Kadin Chung (born 1998), Canadian association football player
- Kadin Semonza (born 2005), American football player

Surname

- Heather Kadin (born 1972), American television and film producer
- Mark Kadin (born 1965), Russian musical director and conductor

== See also ==
- Kaden (name)
