= Aodhamair =

Aodhamair (pronounced [ˈiːmˠəɾʲ, ˈeː-]; Old Irish: Áedammair) is a medieval Gaelic-Irish feminine given name. It has enjoyed a slight resurgence in the late 20th and early 21st century.

== See also ==
- List of Irish-language given names
