= Adin Randall =

American politician

- Born: October 12, 1829; Brookfield, New York
- Died: April 26, 1868 (Age 39)
- Occupations: Entrepreneur, Proprietor, land agent
- Known for: Founder of Eau Claire, Wisconsin and 1st Eau Claire County Treasurer
- Spouse: Clamenzia Babcock (m.1852)
- Children: Six children

Adin Randall (October 12, 1829 – April 26, 1868) was a philanthropist, businessman, and politician in the Chippewa Valley of Wisconsin, who served as a first Treasurer of Eau Claire County, Wisconsin. He ran a ferry across the Chippewa, a planing mill, a sash and door factory, and contracted with Levi Wesley Pond who invented and patented the sheer boom to efficiently shunt logs into Half Moon Lake. He is regarded as one of the founders of the city. He donated the land for Randall Park, Lakeview Cemetery and the Eau Claire Area School District.

== Early life ==
Adin Randall was born in Brookfield, New York. In 1852 he married Clamenzia Babcock, and in 1854 moved west and settled in Madison, Wisconsin. There he became a building contractor and made a little money, with which he bought an interest in a sawmill in Eau Claire, Wisconsin in the fall of 1855.

== Logger and entrepreneur ==
Early in his career in Eau Claire, Randall was associated with Gage & Reed, but soon sold out his interest in the business and purchased the land which is now the west side of the city of Eau Claire. This area was known as Randall Town for some time afterwards. He built a small planing mill and secured the right to operate a ferry on the Chippewa River between the east and west sides.

Randall donated the land for Randall Park to the corporation and also the land for Lakeview cemetery in Eau Claire. To the First Congregational church he gave the land which that society still owns and occupies, and to the Methodist church he donated half of the land which constitutes the present grounds of the Eau Claire Area School District Central Office Building.

In 1856, upon the recognition of Eau Claire as a county by the state legislature, Randall was elected the first county treasurer. In the same year, Randall built the Eau Claire House hotel. Randall was one of the thousands whose finances were affected by the financial convulsions of the United States from 1857 to 1860. In order to carry out his plans he had mortgaged the west side and being unable to meet the claims of the mortgagees they took the property. Randall had the parcel platted as "Eau Claire City." In that way, he helped give the current city its name.

In 1860 he sold out his planing mill and went to Chippewa Falls. He remained there only a short time, however, and then built a saw mill at Jim Falls, Wisconsin, which he ran for two years. Having sold that mill he purchased a grist mill at Reed's Landing, Minnesota and made it over into a saw mill. He operated this until his death on April 26, 1868, when he was thirty-nine years old.

== Legacy ==
Noted for his philanthropies, he donated Randall Park to the city of Eau Claire, and a statue is erected to commemorate him and his service to Eau Claire. Mears began working on the statue in 1911, when commissioned by O. H. Ingram of the City of Eau Claire. The final statue was cast in bronze and installed in Randall Park in Eau Claire in 1915. The Eau Claire Landmarks Commission created a commemorative marker of the life of Randall which is located in Owen Park along the Chippewa River Trail. Randall's home (built in 1862) is in the National Register of Historic Places.
