= Allison Kaden =

American journalist (born 1977)

Allison Kaden (born November 1, 1977) is a general assignment reporter for WPIX-TV in New York City. Kaden joined the station in 2004, after working for News 12 The Bronx. She was hit by a car on March 4, 2010, but returned six weeks later.

== Education and training ==
Kaden holds a bachelor's degree in American Studies from Tulane University and in 2000, earned a master's degree in journalism from Northwestern University's Medill School of Journalism. She also studied photography at American University of Paris.

== Awards and nominations ==
Kaden was nominated for a 2005 Emmy Award by the National Academy of Television Arts & Sciences-New York City in the category Educational Programming: Segment(s) for a piece she did for News 12 The Bronx entitled "In Depth-Waterfront" which aired on July 5, 2004.

Kaden received a Special Mention in 2005 from the New York State Associated Press Broadcasters Association in the category Best Spot News Coverage for a piece on WPIX entitled "Chopper Down."

In 2007, Kaden won a New York Emmy in the category Spot News Story for her part in a report entitled "East Side Explosion."
