= Aidan Meehan =

Celtic artist and author

- Known for: Celtic Art
- Notable work: Celtic Design Series
- Style: Celtic

Aidan Meehan is an Irish artist and author of 18 books on Celtic art and design. including the eight-volume Celtic Design series and Celtic Alphabets, Celtic Borders, The Book of Kells Painting Book, The Lindisfarne Painting Book and Celtic Knots, all published by Thames & Hudson

== Career ==
In 1974 Meehan discovered the triple grid format for creating Knotwork.

== Bibliography ==
- Celtic Design: Knotwork: The Secret Method of the Scribes by Aidan Meehan published 1991
- Celtic Design: A Beginner's Manual by Aidan Meehan published 1991
- Celtic Design: Animal Patterns by Aidan Meehan published 1992
- Celtic Design: Illuminated Letters by Aidan Meehan published 1992
- Celtic Design: Spiral Patterns by Aidan Meehan published 1993
- Celtic Design: Maze Patterns by Aidan Meehan published 1993
- Celtic Design: The Tree of Life by Aidan Meehan published 1995
- Celtic Design: The Dragon and the Griffin: The Viking Impact by Aidan Meehan published 1995
- Celtic Patterns for Painting and Crafts by Aidan Meehan 1997
- Celtic Alphabets by Aidan Meehan published 1998
- Celtic Borders by Aidan Meehan Published 1999
- The Book of Kells Painting Book by Aidan Meehan published 1999
- The Lindisfarne Painting Book by Aidan Meehan 2000
- Celtic Knots: Mastering the Traditional Patterns by Aidan Meehan published 2003
- The Treasury of Celtic Knots by Aidan Meehan 2005
- The Celtic Design Book by Aidan Meehan published 2007

== See also ==
- Celtic knot
- Labyrinth
- Celtic maze
- Endless knot
- Book of Kells
