= Aiden Maher =

English footballer

Personal information
- Date of birth: 1 December 1946 (age 79)
- Place of birth: Liverpool, England
- Position: Winger

Senior career*
Years	Team	Apps	(Gls)
1967–1968	Everton	1	(0)
1968–1971	Plymouth Argyle	64	(3)
1971–1972	Tranmere Rovers	7	(1)
- Bath City
Total		72	(4)
- * Club domestic league appearances and goals

Aiden Maher (born 1 December 1946) is a footballer who played as a winger in the Football League for Everton, Plymouth Argyle and Tranmere Rovers.
