= Hayes High School =

Hayes High School may refer to:

- Carol W. Hayes High School, Birmingham, Alabama
- Cardinal Hayes High School, New York City (Bronx)
- Rutherford B. Hayes High School, Delaware, Ohio
- Max S. Hayes High School, Cleveland, Ohio
- Leo Hayes High School, Fredericton, New Brunswick, Canada
