= Aidan Somers =

Irish hurler

Personal information
- Native name: Aodán Ó Somacháin (Irish)
- Born: 1945 (age 80–81) Rathnure, County Wexford, Ireland
- Occupation: Farmer Retired

Sport
- Sport: Hurling
- Position: Right corner-back
Club
- Years: Club
- Rathnure
Club titles
- Wexford titles: 8
- Leinster titles: 3
Inter-county*
Years	County	Apps (scores)
1970	Wexford	1 (0-00)
Inter-county titles
- Leinster titles: 1
- All-Irelands: 0
- NHL: 0
- All Stars: 0
- *Inter County team apps and scores correct as of 17:48, 8 July 2014.

Aidan Somers (born 1945) is an Irish retired hurler who played as a right corner-back for the Wexford senior team.

Born in Rathnure, County Wexford, Somers first arrived on the inter-county scene at the age of seventeen when he first linked up with the Wexford minor team, before later joining the under-21 side. He joined the senior panel during the 1970 championship and played for just one season. Somers won one Leinster medal on the field of play.

At club level Somers is a three-time Leinster medallist with Rathnure. In addition to this he also won eight championship medals.

== Honours ==
=== Team ===
Rathnure

- Leinster Senior Club Hurling Championship (3): 1971, 1973, 1977
- Wexford Senior Club Hurling Championship (8): 1967, 1971, 1972, 1973, 1974, 1977, 1979, 1980

Wexford

- Leinster Senior Hurling Championship (1): 1970
- All-Ireland Under-21 Hurling Championship (1): 1965
- Leinster Under-21 Hurling Championship (2): 1965, 1966
