= Edin Rahic =

German businessman

Edin Rahic is a German businessman who was the co-owner of Bradford City.

== Career ==
In 2016, Dai became co-owner of English side Bradford City.
