= Lukas Kragl =

Austrian footballer (born 1990)

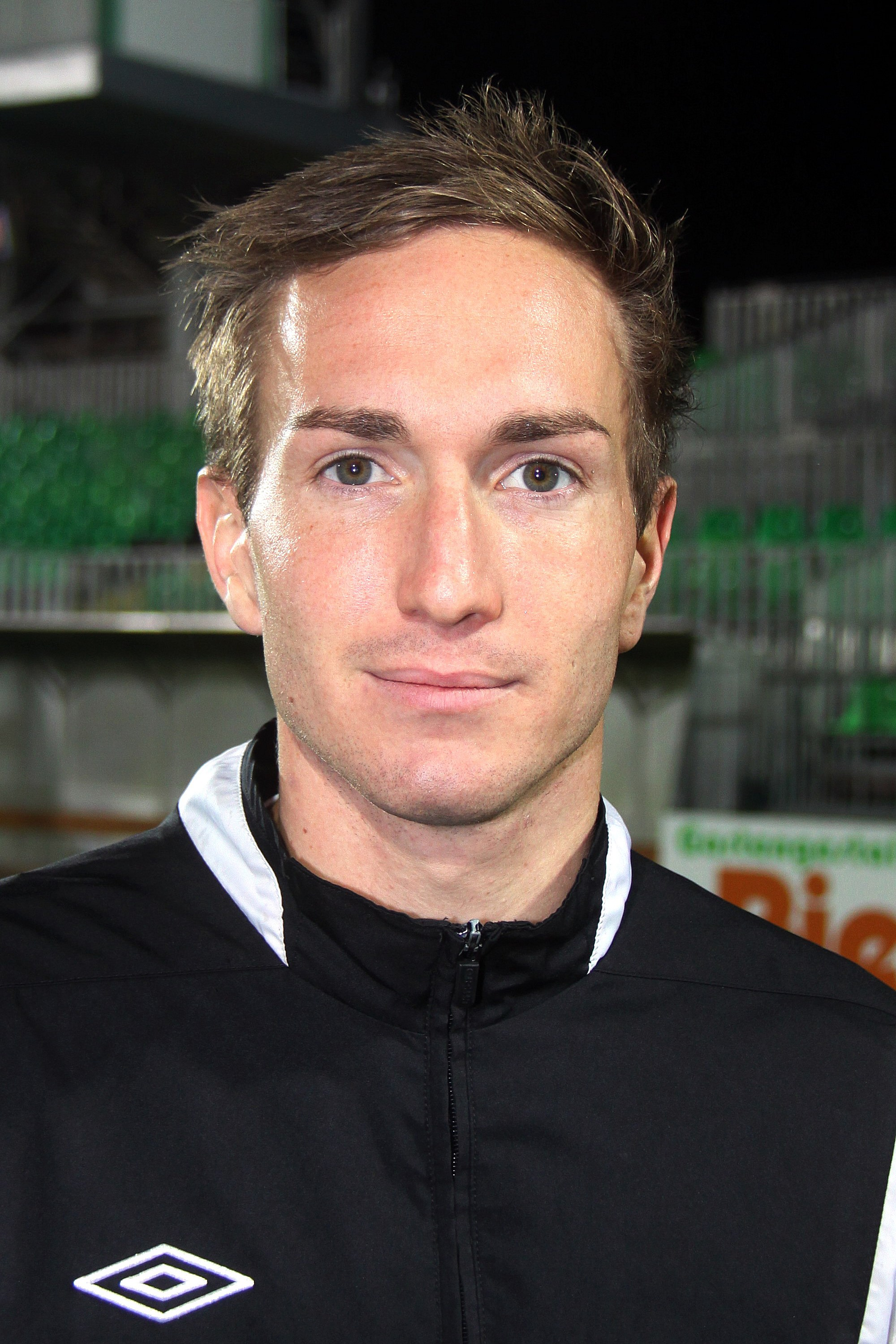
- Kragl in 2013

Personal information
- Date of birth: 12 January 1990 (age 36)
- Place of birth: Linz, Austria
- Height: 1.81 m (5 ft 11 1/2 in)
- Position: Midfielder

Team information
- Current team: Union Dietach
- Number: 9

Youth career
- 1996–1998: ASKÖ Ebelsberg Linz
- 1998–2009: LASK Linz

Senior career*
Years	Team	Apps	(Gls)
2009–2012	LASK Linz	41	(3)
2012–2014	Austria Lustenau	23	(1)
2014–2016	SKN St. Pölten II	4	(1)
2014–2016	SKN St. Pölten	13	(1)
2016	→ Stadl-Paura (loan)	7	(0)
2016–2017	Union Weißkirchen	22	(11)
2017–2018	FC Wels	20	(14)
2019	ASKÖ Oedt	10	(1)
2019–2020	Union Perg	12	(5)
2020–	Union Dietach	11	(8)

International career
2010	Austria U-21	2	(0)
- * Club domestic league appearances and goals as of 10:28, 26 October 2020 (UTC)

Lukas Kragl (born 20 January 1990) is an Austrian footballer who currently plays for Union Dietach.
