= Adin =

Family name

Adin /ˈɑːdɪn/ is an uncommon family name found today in the United States (particularly New York City), England, Israel, New Zealand, Spain (particularly the Basque Country, Sweden and Turkey.

== Origin ==
=== Biblical references ===
Since the name occurs in the Old Testament and is mentioned in the Bible four times, it has been suggested that the name has Jewish origins. Ezra 2:15 King James Version "The children of Adin, four hundred fifty and four".

However, the Jewish Genealogical Society of Great Britain have no records of this as a Jewish family name. Albeit, the Consolidated Jewish Family Name Index of U.S. based Avotaynu indicates Adin is a Jewish family name that was present in Poland and Belarus prior to World War II.

Due to the name having just 4 letters, it may be a phonetic coincidence that it exists across diverse cultures.

Who's Who in the Old Testament Together with the Apocrytha by Joan Comay states that Adin (Heb. "delicate") 1. date unknown. Ancestor of a family of Judah who returned with Zerubbabel from Exile in Babylon. Ezra 2:15; 8:6; Nehemiah 7:20.

=== Records of Adin's in England ===
The International Genealogical Index charts migration of the Adin family name throughout England from Great Wigborough, Essex, in 1567, to the midlands in the late 17th century, in particular Staffordshire and Derbyshire, followed by migration to Liverpool and Manchester in the 1840s during the Industrial Revolution and on to the United States. Some branches remained in Derbyshire until they emigrated to Foxton, New Zealand, in 1863, arriving on a ship called the Helvellyn.

=== Cultural assimilation within the United States ===
During the 19th and 20th centuries many immigrants poured into the United States from various European countries and the dominant culture found their names to be difficult to pronounce and/or even spell. Adin, as a family name was chosen by a very small number of Eastern European immigrants during the cultural assimilation to the United States for socio-political reasons and acceptance by the dominant culture. Entire families legally modified their family name from "Adinski" and "Adinus" to Adin; some decades after their arrival into the United States.

=== Emigration to Israel ===
Since 1948 many immigrants have also changed their names back to Hebrew names; some have chosen Adin, in order to erase remnants of "galuti" (exiled) life still surviving in family names from other languages.

== Other uses ==
Adin is also used as a first name in Spanish-speaking and Bosnian cultures.

== See also ==
- List of Biblical names
- English name
- Hebrew name
- Jewish name
- Turkish name
