= Aidan Browne (Gaelic footballer) =

Irish Gaelic footballer

Personal information
- Native name: Aodán de Brun (Irish)
- Born: 1998 (age 27–28) Newmarket, County Cork, Ireland
- Occupation: Student

Sport
- Sport: Gaelic Football
- Position: Wing-back
Club
- Years: Club
- Newmarket
Club titles
- Cork titles: 0
College
- Years: College
- Cork Institute of Technology
College titles
- Sigerson titles: 0
Inter-county
- Years: County
- 2019-present: Cork
Inter-county titles
- Munster titles: 0
- All-Irelands: 0
- NFL: 0
- All Stars: 0

Aidan Browne (born 1998) is an Irish Gaelic footballer who plays for Premier Intermediate Championship club Newmarket and at inter-county level with the Cork senior football team. He usually lines out as a wing-back.

He and Killian O'Hanlon sustained cruciate injuries in separate incidents when training resumed ahead of the delayed 2021 season. They were both ruled out for the season.
