= Aiden Dillard =

American film director

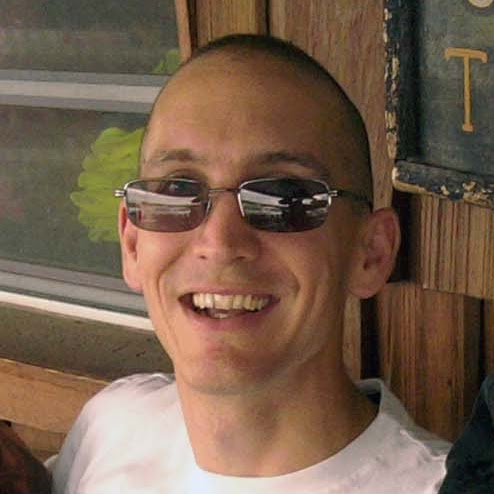
- Born: Escondido, California
- Known for: Meat Weed Madness

Aiden Dillard is an American independent film director and artist. He is known for using surreal humor and camp (style) within the confines of low-budget film. Aiden Dillard was born in Escondido, California, but grew up in Durham, North Carolina. Aiden Dillard's feature films and video art often deals with contrasts between a rural and urban area, and high culture and low culture. While studying at Cooper Union in New York City on a full-tuition scholarship, his student film "The Battle of the Burps and Farts" was screened at TromaDance 2004; it was the only film in the history of the festival that was booed by everybody in attendance. Upon graduation Aiden Dillard directed an outrageous psychedelic spoof of "Reefer Madness", titled "Meat Weed Madness", which featured set decoration by Joe Holtzman, the editor-in-chief of Nest (magazine), and crudely constructed props and stop-motion animation. "Meat Weed Madness" premièred at the Wolfsonian-FIU in December 2005 during Art Basel Miami Beach, and was released on DVD by Troma Entertainment in 2006. Aiden Dillard's even more outrageous sequel Meat Weed America was released by Troma Entertainment on DVD in the fall of 2007; the film features Troma's president Lloyd Kaufman, Debbie Rochon, and Peter Stickles. In 2008, Aiden Dillard moved to Miami, and wrote, produced, and directed a psychedelic crime-drama about children with autism who see angels called Special Angelz, which premiered at Borscht Film Festival. In 2009, Aiden Dillard wrote, produced, and directed an action-comedy spoof of Death Wish called Death Print, which was set in the Miami art-world and shows an art dealer, played by Ted Vernon, who battles a Cuban Communist terrorist, with the help of musician Otto Von Schirach. This movie had a sold out premiere at the Colony Theatre in South Beach. From 2010 to 2012, Aiden Dillard performed in an art noise band, called Ballscarf, that incorporated video projections and Aiden Dillard's own nudity to produce an effect that was described as "nightmaris chaos". In 2013, Aiden Dillard moved back to North Carolina and began to focus on visual art. In 2014, Troma Entertainment released Aiden Dillard's campy yet bloody slasher film Bikini Swamp Girl Massacre on DVD.
