= Edin Numankadić =

Bosnian visual artist (1948–2026)

- Born: 13 June 1948; Sarajevo, PR Bosnia and Herzegovina, FPR Yugoslavia
- Died: 22 June 2026 (aged 78); Sarajevo, Bosnia and Herzegovina
- Education: Pedagogical Academy Sarajevo, Department of Art Education (1953)
- Notable work: Witnesses of Existence (Svjedoci postojanja)
- Movement: Painting
- Awards: Sixth of April Sarajevo Award

Edin Numankadić (13 June 1948 – 22 June 2026) was a Bosnian visual artist active from the early 1970s.

== Early life and education ==
Edin Numankadić was born in Sarajevo on 13 June 1948.

He graduated from the Pedagogical Academy in Sarajevo, Department of Art Education. He also studied History of Yugoslav Literatures at the Faculty of Humanities in Sarajevo.

== Career ==
In his early period, Numankadić expressed himself through the language of color-field painting and process and analytical painting. Later, during and after the Bosnian war, he incorporated the practice of Objet trouvé (found objects). Numankadić reached his artistic peak with the destruction of his pre-war works.

Numerous solo exhibitions and participation in major international art events, along with many awards and accolades, testify to his active and continuous contribution to the development of Bosnian and Herzegovinian fine arts. He was one of the founders of the art group "1+1+1" in the early 1970s, the "Prostor-Oblik" (Space-Form) group in the mid-1970s, and the "KAMMEN" group. Through his artistic activities, he undoubtedly contributed to the pluralization and liberalization of the arts on the Bosnian-Herzegovinian scene. He participated twice in the Venice Biennale – in 1993 with the project "Witnesses of Existence", and in 2003 as part of the BiH selection.

He served as director of the Sarajevo Winter Olympics Museum and was one of the founders of the Ars Aevi collection (Museum of Contemporary Art in Sarajevo), where he served as a permanent advisor.

Numankadić was a member of the ULUBiH since 1974. He held over fifty solo and over 300 group exhibitions at home and abroad.

== Death ==
Numankadić died in Sarajevo on 22 June 2026, at the age of 78.

== Awards and honours ==
He received over twenty prestigious awards for his work. Notably, in 2021, he was awarded the French order of Order of Arts and Letters (Chevalier de l'ordre des Arts et des Lettres).

== Selected works ==
- Space, Color, Time (Prostor, boja, vrijeme) – acrylic on canvas, 1974–82.
- Traces (Tragovi) – mixed media, 1982.
- Records (Zapisi) – acrylic on paper, 2008.
- Boxes (Kutije) – mixed media, 2008.

== See also ==
- Ars Aevi
- Venice Biennale
