= Aidan Lyons =

South African cricketer

Personal information
- Full name: Aidan Thomas Lyons
- Born: December 1878; Port Elizabeth, Cape Colony
- Died: 12 February 1910 (aged 31); Queenstown, South Africa
- Bowling: Right-arm medium-pace
- Role: All-rounder

Domestic team information
- Years: Team
- 1902/03–1908/09: Eastern Province

Career statistics
Competition	First-class
Matches	13
Runs scored	380
Batting average	18.09
100s/50s	0/0
Top score	44
Balls bowled	1,601
Wickets	49
Bowling average	13.77
5 wickets in innings	3
10 wickets in match	1
Best bowling	7/56
Catches/stumpings	6/0
- Source: Cricinfo, 16 June 2023

Aidan Thomas Lyons (December 1878 – 12 February 1910) was a South African cricketer. He played in thirteen first-class matches for Eastern Province between 1902/03 and 1908/09.

Lyons was one of Eastern Province's most reliable players during the 1900s. In the quarter-final of the Currie Cup in 1904–05, he opened the batting and scored 37, when no one else for Eastern Province reached 20, and Western Province's highest was only 42. His best bowling figures were 7 for 56 and 6 for 23 against Griqualand West in the 1902–03 Currie Cup; eight of his victims were bowled. He took 7 for 66 and carried his bat for 31 not out for a Port Elizabeth XV against the touring MCC in 1905–06.

He died after a long illness in hospital in Queenstown in February 1910, aged 31.
