= Aidan O'Neill =

Scottish barrister (born 1961)

Aidan O'Neill KC

Personal details
- Born: 1961 (age 64–65)
- Education: University of Edinburgh; University of Sydney
- Occupation: Advocate & Barrister
- Website: https://www.matrixlaw.co.uk/member/aidan-oneill/ https://ampersandadvocates.com/people/aidan-oneill-qc/

Aidan O'Neill KC (born 1961) is a Scottish advocate, barrister, and King's Counsel.

He has pleaded almost thirty times before the Supreme Court of the United Kingdom and House of Lords, as well before the Court of Justice of the European Union and the European Court of Human Rights.

He appeared for Joanna Cherry MP before the Supreme Court of the United Kingdom in the September 2019 case relating to the prorogation of Parliament.

== Career ==
O'Neill read Law from 1978 to 1982, obtaining a First Class LL.B. (Hons.) degree from the University of Edinburgh. He then studied a Diploma in Legal Practice also at Edinburgh from 1982 to 1983.

He studied at the University of Sydney from 1983 to 1985, obtaining a First Class LL.M. (Hons.) degree where he wrote his thesis on “The Foundations and Structures of Legal Reasoning: an investigation into the role and scope of practical reasoning in our understanding of the law”.

O'Neill was called to the Faculty of Advocates in July 1987. In July 1999 he was appointed Queen's Counsel (QC) in Scotland.

He obtained a further LL.M. degree from the European University Institute after studying there between 1991 and 1992. His degree was in Comparative, International and European law and he produced a thesis titled “The Government of Judges: a study in judicial politics and the rule of law”.

O'Neill holds rare “double silk” status, having become a Scottish QC in 1999, and more recently taking silk in England and Wales in 2017.

From 1997 to 1999 O'Neill was Standing Junior Counsel to the Scottish Office Education and Industry Department.

He is a member of Ampersand Advocates in Scotland. He joined his present London chambers, Matrix Chambers of Gray's Inn, London in 2000, and became a member in 2010.

He was awarded a doctoral degree (LL.D) from the University of Edinburgh in 2012 on the basis of his work's academic merits, independent scholarship and legal substance of published books.

O'Neill was appointed Queen's Counsel in England and Wales in February 2017.

He called to the Bar of Ireland in December 2020.

He was appointed by a cross-party group of 75 MPs and peers to contest a case for judicial review against the Government in the Scottish Court of Session. He went on to receive widespread media coverage in September 2019 upon representing the group including Joanna Cherry MP against the government (represented by Advocate General for Scotland, Lord Keen QC) in the case of R (Miller) v Prime Minister; Cherry & Ors v Advocate General for Scotland.

In the case he contested the use of prorogation powers by Prime Minister Boris Johnson. He was cited in media reports as passionately arguing to the justices that the "Mother of parliaments been shut down by the father of lies".

== Specialisms ==
Ampersand Advocates describe O'Neill as having particular experience and expertise in commercial judicial review, environmental/Aarhus law and in employment/equality law. He is also specialist in EU law, in human rights law and in UK constitutional law.

== Noted cases ==
- 2018 - Case C-621/18 Wightman v. Secretary of State [2018] CSOH 8 & [2018] CSIH 62 - a case regarding Article 50 TEU notification which ended up in the CJEU, who ruled the notification is unilaterally revocable by the UK
- 2017 - Case C-333/14 Scotch Whisky Association and others v. Scottish Ministers re minimum alcohol pricing [2017] UKSC 76; [2016] CSIH 77; EU:C:2015:845; [2014] CSIH 38; [2013] CSOH 70 – a case regarding the compatibility of the Scottish Alcohol Act 2012 with Article 34 TFEU on free movement of goods
- 2017 - R (Miller) v Secretary of State for Exiting the European Union [2017] UKSC 5 - a case querying if the UK Government could rely upon prerogative powers to trigger Article 50 TEU to leave the EU
- 2013 - Bulls v. Preddy and Hall [2013] UKSC 73 – a case about whether Christian guesthouse owners could refuse a double bed room to a civil partnership couple on grounds of religious conviction

== Personal life ==
O'Neill speaks and writes in French and Italian, and has knowledge of German.

== Publications ==
Books
Title	Publisher	Year
Brexit, law and trade: a guide for the perplexed	Hart Publishing	Due to be published
EU law for UK Lawyers	Hart Publishing	2011
Judicial Review in Scotland: a practitioner's guide	Hart Publishing	1999
Decisions of the European Court of Justice and their constitutional implications	Hart Publishing	1994

Articles
Title	Publication	Year
EU law in the Supreme Court	8 UK Supreme Court Yearbook	2018
Brexit, Bilateral Investment Treaties and their Enforcement	17 ERA Forum (online)	2018
EU fundamental rights in a devolved United Kingdom	Chapter 8, Douglas-Scott (ed.) Research handbook on EU law and human rights (Edward Elgar Publishing, 2017) 186-208	2017
Miller, Brexit and breUK-up	Counsel 27-29	March 2017
(Dis)Enfranchisement and Free Movement	Chapter 4 in Koutrakos, Nic Suibhne & Syrpis (eds.) Exceptions from Free Movement Law (Hart Publishing, 2016) 53-79	2017
Strategic Litigation before the European courts	16 ERA Forum 495-509	2015
The courts, the church and the constitution revisited	Chapter 46 in Burrows, Johnston & Zimmermann (eds.) Judge and Jurist: essays in memory of Lord Rodger of Earlsferry (OUP, 2013) 637-653	2013
The sovereignty of the (Scottish) people: 1689 and all that	18 Judicial Review 446-463	2013
Back to the future? Judges, politicians and the constitution in the new Scotland	18 Judicial Review 45-71	2013
EU law and Fundamental Rights	Judicial Review 216-247	2011
The curtailment of criminal appeals to London	15 Edinburgh Law Review 88-92	2011
Prosecuting Crimes Against Peace Before the Scottish Courts	Johnson & Zelter (eds.) Trident and international law: Scotland's obligations (Edinburgh: Luath Press, 2011) 177-201	2011
Human rights and people and society	Chapter 2 in Sutherland, Goodall, Little & Davidson (eds.) The Scottish Parliament: The Early Years (Edinburgh University Press: 2010) 35-57	2009
Limited Government, Fundamental Rights and the Scottish Constitutional Tradition	Juridical Review 85-128	2009
Constitutional Judicial Review in Scotland – some recent developments	14 Judicial Review 267-290	2011
Roman Catholicism and the temptation of shari’a	15 Common Knowledge (Duke University Press) 269-315	2009

== Awards ==
Award	Organisation	Year	Result
EU law silk of the year	Legal 500	2015	Won
Silk of the year	Scottish Legal Awards	2017	Won
Silk of the year	Scottish Legal Awards	2018	Won
