= Aidan Key =

American transgender writer

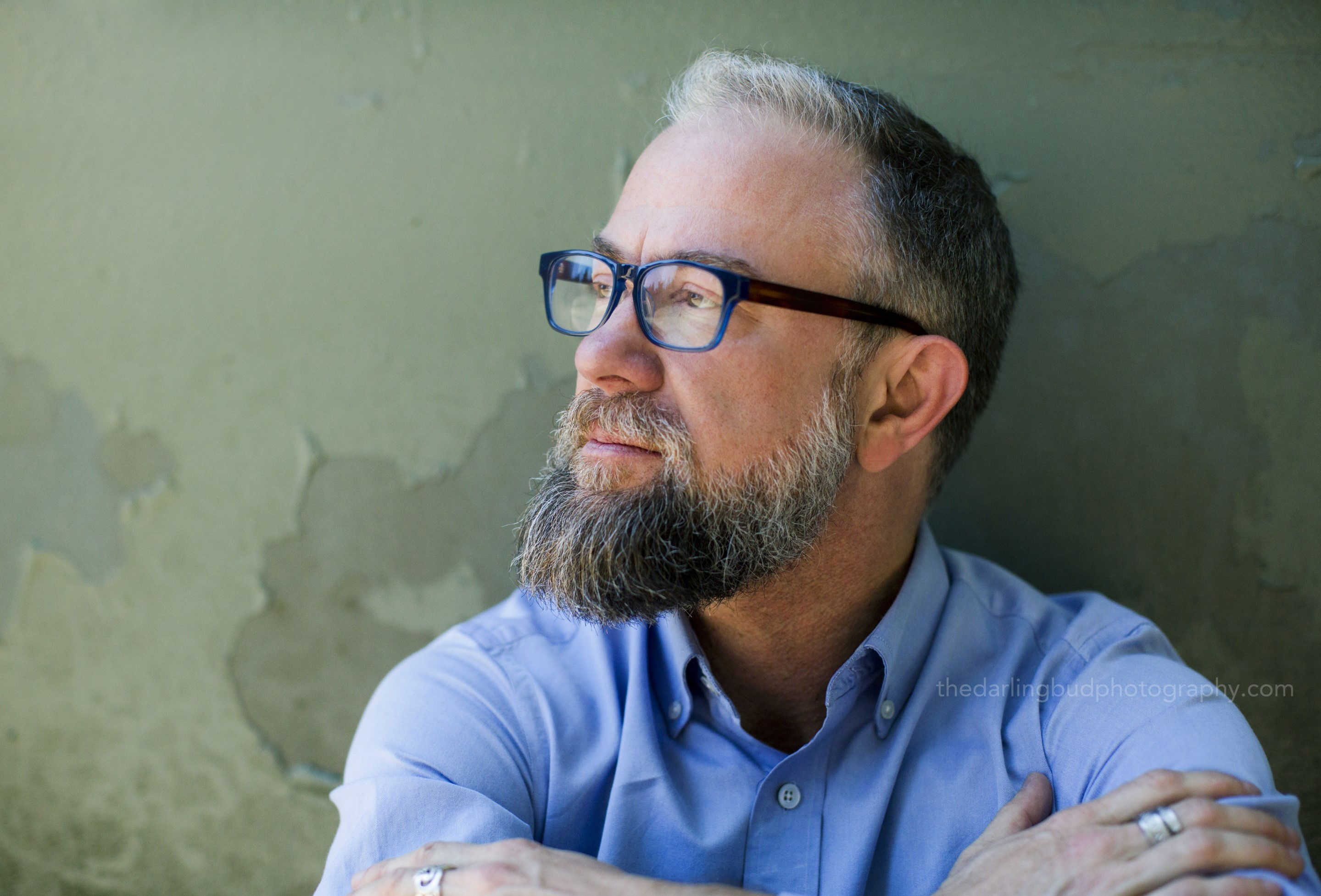
- Key in Seattle
- Born: Michigan, U.S.
- Occupations: Author, educator, public speaker
- Known for: Gender Diverse Youth Sports Inclusivity Toolkit; Gender Odyssey Conference; TransFamilies Parent Support
- Notable work: Trans Children in Today's Schools (Oxford); Trans Bodies, Trans Selves Editions 1 & 2 (Oxford)

Aidan Key (born January 22, 1964) is a speaker, author, and educator whose gender-related career spans over 25 years. His work has placed him in front of myriad audiences, including kindergartners, graduate students, teachers, superintendents, judges, physicians, psychiatrists, and clergy. Key is an expert on transgender and nonbinary children and adults and has been featured on national and international television, radio, and the internet, and in print media. As the founder and lead trainer of Gender Diversity, Key provides guidance and training to schools and school districts, as well as workplace trainings for organizations desiring to incorporate gender inclusivity.

== Career ==
Key's expertise on gender diversity in children has informed gender-inclusive policy work in the Seattle Public Schools, the Washington State Office of Superintendent of Public Instruction, and the Washington Interscholastic Activities Association, with whom he collaborated on the creation of the Gender Diverse Youth Sports Inclusivity Toolkit. His work developing policies and procedures for inclusion and equity for gender-diverse children benefits all K-12 children.

He is the author of Trans Children in Today’s Schools, published by Oxford University Press (2023). He is a contributing author to the anthology Trans Bodies, Trans Selves (2014 and 2022 second edition), which addresses support for and understanding of transgender children. He co-authored the 2016 American Psychological Association PsycNet article “Gender Cognition in Transgender Children.”

Key founded the international Gender Odyssey conference in 2001, which grew to include, in 2007, the Gender Odyssey Family conference, for families with trans and gender-diverse children, and the Gender Odyssey Professional conference, which provides instruction to medical, mental health, and education professionals. Gender Odyssey keynote speakers have included notables such as Chaz Bono; Cheryl Kilodavis, author of My Princess Boy; Janet Mock, writer, television host, director, producer, and transgender rights activist; Minneapolis city council member Andrea Jenkins, the first Black, openly transgender woman elected to public office; and author, performer, and gender activist Kate Bornstein.

In 2007 Key co-founded the (now) Bay Area nonprofit Gender Spectrum. In 2010, he founded Gender Diversity, which currently houses his training work and speaking engagements.

Key helped to create and served on the advisory board of Seattle Children's Gender Clinic, and served on the advisory committee of TRANSform Washington, a public education campaign advancing the dignity, diversity, and humanity of trans and gender-diverse people. His past collaborations include working with Three Dollar Bill Cinema to launch Translations: The Seattle Transgender Film Festival in 2006.

In 2020 Key founded Trans Families, a nonprofit that provides virtual support groups for families with trans and gender-diverse children of all ages.

== Media ==
His perspective on trans issues has often been featured in the national media, including multiple reports on CNN, The Oprah Winfrey Show, Reuters, NPR's Diane Rehm Show and Fresh Air with Terry Gross, Al Jazeera America, The Huffington Post, Inside Edition, Nightline, The New York Times, The Seattle Times, Parent Map, Vice, and Larry King Live. His appearance on Larry King Live inspired a Saturday Night Live skit spoofing the obvious confusion of the host on issues related to transgender identities. In addition, Aidan is interviewed by Joe Wenke in their 2015 book, The Human Agenda: Conversations about Sexual Orientation & Gender Identity

Key was a lead cast member and associate producer for the documentary The Most Dangerous Year.

== Speaking ==
Key has been a regular speaker, panelist, and presenter at engagements at over one hundred corporate and community events, including for Amazon, Capgemini, Starbucks, the National Association of Women Judges, JP Morgan Chase, Bechtel, National Geographic, Phillips North America, the University of Alaska Power and Privilege Conference, Marsh McClellan, Cigna, the Portland Trail Blazers, Planned Parenthood, Fred Hutchison Cancer Research Center, Seattle Children's Hospital, the National Alliance on Mental Illness, the Equal Employment Opportunity Council, the University of Chicago, the University of Washington, and the Seattle Office of Civil Rights.

He's also spoken at a host of other events at churches, universities, and conferences, including the DSHS Children's Justice Conference in 2013, the Adolescent Health Medicine Conference in 2010, The Power of One LGBT Student Leadership Conference, the Oregon Judges Conference, and the Gender Odyssey Conference in 2014.

== Personal ==
Key is an identical twin. His sister, Brenda, has joined him for numerous media appearances, including The Oprah Winfrey Show and the ITV documentary The Secret Life of Twins, and they have been featured in articles in numerous international publications. Siblings, Aidan and Brenda were the impetus for the launch of a 2001 research project by Milton Diamond, PhD, Transsexuality Among Twins, studying the concordance of transgender gender identity in identical twins.

Key is married and the father of one.

== Awards ==
Key has been awarded over 20 formal accolades for leadership and influence, including Seattle Magazine’s Most Influential People of the Year in 2019; Huffington Post’s Top 30 LGBTQ Change Makers in 2018; the 2017 Greater Seattle Business Association Community Leader and Humanitarian of the Year Award; the Trans 100 inaugural Member Award (2013); the 2014 Community Service Lifetime Achievement Award from the Washington Department of Health & Human Services; inclusion in Seattle Magazine’s "Movers & Shakers: Seattle's Most Influential People of the Year 2019"; the 2009 Chicago Black Pride Esteem Award; a 2006–2008 Horace Mann Humanitarian Award nomination from Antioch University; and a 2007 GLAAD Media Award nomination for his appearance on The Oprah Winfrey Show.
