= Aidan Lennon =

Irish Gaelic footballer

Personal information
- Born: County Westmeath

Sport
- Sport: Gaelic football
- Position: Goalkeeper
Club
- Years: Club
- St Joseph's
Inter-county
- Years: County
- 1998-2000s: Westmeath
Inter-county titles
- Leinster titles: 1
- All-Irelands: 0
- NFL: 1 (Div 2)

Aidan Lennon is a Gaelic footballer from County Westmeath, Ireland. He played in goal for the Westmeath county team during the 1990s and 2000s and was part of the Westmeath team that won the 1995 All-Ireland Minor Football Championship. He also won a National Football League Div 2 medal in 2003 and was part of the panel that won the county's first Leinster Senior Football Championship in 2004.
