= Edin Kozica =

Bosnian footballer

Personal information
- Date of birth: 30 March 1986 (age 40)
- Place of birth: SR Bosnia and Herzegovina, SFR Yugoslavia
- Position: Defender

Senior career*
Years	Team	Apps	(Gls)
2008–2009	Olimpik	2	(0)
2009–2010	Rudar Kakanj		
2009–2010	Iskra Bugojno		
2010–2011	SAŠK Napredak		
2011–2012	Famos Hrasnica	1	(0)
2012–2014	Čapljina	31	(0)
2015	London City	20	(7)
2015–2017	Goražde	22	(0)
- * Club domestic league appearances and goals

Edin Kozica (born March 30, 1986) is a Bosnian former footballer who played as a defender.

== Club career ==
=== Early career ===
Kozica initially was given a trial session with Olimpik Sarajevo during the summer of 2008 and would ultimately sign for the season. Following a brief spell in the state capital, he would remain in the country's second division by joining Rudar Kakanj. His spell with Rudar was short-lived as he departed from the club midway through the season to play with Iskra Bugojno. In 2010, he was transferred to Napredak and also played with Famos Hrasnica the following season.

For the 2012–13 season, he spent the campaign with HNK Čapljina. Kozica would participate in the 2012–13 Bosnia Cup where Čapljina initially defeated premier league side Borac Banja Luka. He would re-sign with Čapljina for the next season.

=== Canada ===
In the summer of 2015, he played in the Canadian Soccer League with London City. Kozica would help London secure a playoff berth by finishing eighth in the league's first division. London would be eliminated from the postseason competition in the opening round by the Serbian White Eagles. He would finish the season as the club's top goal scorer with 7 goals.

=== Bosnia ===
After a season abroad, he returned to Bosnia to sign with FK Goražde.

== Managerial career ==
In 2017, he retired from professional football and became involved with coaching in Canada.
