= Aidan Fitzgerald =

Irish Gaelic footballer & hurler (born 1980)

Personal information
- Native name: Aodán Mac Gearailt (Irish)
- Born: 1980 (age 45–46) Fethard, County Tipperary, Ireland

Sport
- Sport: Gaelic football
- Position: Right wing-forward
Club
- Years: Club
- Fethard
Club titles
- Tipperary titles: 1
Inter-county
- Years: County
- 2003-2010: Tipperary
Inter-county titles
- Munster titles: 0
- All-Irelands: 0
- NFL: 0
- All Stars: 0

Aidan Fitzgerald (born 1980) is an Irish Gaelic footballer who played as a right wing-forward for the Tipperary senior team.

Born in Fethard, County Tipperary, Fitzgerald first arrived on the inter-county scene at the age of nineteen when he first linked up with the Tipperary under-21 team before later joining the intermediate hurling side. He joined the senior football panel during the 2000 championship. Fitzgerald subsequently became a regular member of the starting fifteen and won one Tommy Murphy Cup medal.

At club level Fitzgerald is a one-time championship medallist with Fethard.

Fitzgerald retired from inter-county football following the conclusion of the 2009 championship.

== Honours ==
=== Player ===
Moyle Rovers

- Tipperary Senior Football Championship (1): 2001

Tipperary

- Tommy Murphy Cup (1): 2005
- McGrath Cup (1): 2003
