= Aodh Mac Dónaill =

Irish scribe

Aodh Mac Dónaill (Anglicized: Hugh McDonnell) was a scribe from County Meath. Among the works he transcribed was Seachrán Chairn tSiadhail by Tarlach Rua Mac Dónaill. It is now contained in a manuscript house in the Public Library, Belfast.
