= Aidan Troy =

Irish Roman Catholic priest

Fr. Aidan Troy is an Irish Catholic priest who has served in Rome, Ardoyne in Northern Ireland, and Paris. He is a member of the Passionist order.

== Early life ==
He was born in Bray, County Wicklow in 1946. His father worked on the railways and his mother looked after him, his brother and sister.

He graduated from University College Dublin with a Bachelor of Arts degree in philosophy in 1967 and from Clonliffe College with a bachelor of divinity degree in 1971.

He was ordained around Christmas 1971.

== Holy Cross dispute ==
He was posted from Rome to the Ardoyne area of Belfast, where he became parish priest. He also became head of the board of governors of Holy Cross Primary school, a Catholic school in a Protestant area.

In June 2001 Loyalist protestors began picketing the school, claiming that Catholics were regularly attacking their homes. The harassment escalated from sectarian taunting to stones, bricks, fireworks and blast bombs after the school holidays. He walked with the parents and children daily for three months.

During this time he received a series of death threats. On one occasion police offered to escort him to the border with the Republic of Ireland as there had been a threat to kill him that weekend. He turned down that offer as well as an offer of the use of an apartment in Belfast owned by the Irish government.

In April 2003 a 17 year old took their own life in Holy Cross and the experience he had dealing with the deceased's family led him to publish a book, Out Of The Shadow: Responding To Suicide in 2009.

In December 2024 papers declassified under the thirty-year rule revealed that the government of the Republic of Ireland had offered him the use of a flat leased by the Department of Foreign Affairs in Belfast after he received death threats. He declined the offer as he didn't want to leave Ardoyne and feared that drawing publicity to the threats would have an adverse effect on the children.

== Paris ==
In 2008 he was posted to a parish in Paris. He was reluctant to leave, but he obeyed his superiors.

He used to relax by playing golf but started cycling in Paris. He is also a fan of Accrington Stanley F.C.

He suggested in 2014 that the French practice of separating religious and secular education is something that might be explored in Ireland.
