= Aiden Grennell =

Irish actor (1920–2001)

Aiden Grennell (January 10, 1920 - January 13, 2001) was an Irish actor. He is known for his roles in Michael Collins (1996), In the Name of the Father (1993) and Driftwood (1997).

== Early life ==
Aiden was born in Dublin, Ireland as the only child of Aiden Peter Joseph and Stella Mary. He married actress Iris Lawler in 1949 while performing with her in Salisbury.

== Career ==
In his 20's, Aiden joined Longford Productions and later became a member of RTE Players for 13 years where he was cast in over 22 productions.

His funeral was held at Terenure College Chapel in Dublin.
