= Hayes Creek =

River in San Francisco, California

Hayes Creek is a small river in San Francisco, California, that has been largely culverted. The only remaining portion above ground is in the Mission Creek Channel that drains into China Basin.
