= Hayes, California =

Coordinates: 36°37′58″N 120°38′26″W

Hayes or Hayes Station is a former settlement in Fresno County, California, United States. It was located 18 miles (29 km) southwest of Mendota, next to Silver Creek and slightly northeast of that waterway's junction with Panoche Creek. The Panoche road exit on I-5 (Exit 368) lies approximately one mile east-northeast of the location.

A post office operated at Hayes from 1893 to 1902. The place was named for its first postmaster, William J. Hayes.

Murderer James Dunham was seen near Hayes station in June 1896.
