= Edin Ramčić =

Bosnian footballer

Personal information
- Date of birth: 1 August 1970 (age 56)
- Place of birth: Yugoslavia
- Height: 1.85 m (6 ft 1 in)
- Position: Midfielder

Senior career*
Years	Team	Apps	(Gls)
1989–1992	Iskra Bugojno	32	(1)
1992–1993	Uljanik	3	(0)
1993–2001	AA Gent	196	(2)
2001–2002	RWDM	22	(1)
2002–2004	Oostende	52	(5)
2004–2005	Eendracht Aalst	10	(3)
2005	Nitra		

International career
1996–1998	Bosnia and Herzegovina	6	(0)

Managerial career
- 2007: Oostende
- * Club domestic league appearances and goals

Edin Ramčić (born 1 August 1970) is a Bosnian former professional footballer who played as a midfielder.

== Club career ==
Ramčić came to Belgium as a virtually unknown player, but managed to become captain of AA Gent in a few years time. At Gent, he played alongside compatriot Suvad Katana in the centre of defense.

== International career ==
Ramčić made his debut for Bosnia and Herzegovina in a December 1996 friendly match away against Brazil and has earned a total of 6 caps, scoring no goals. His final international was an October 1998 European Championship qualification match against Lithuania.
