= Edin Pepić =

German footballer

Personal information
- Full name: Edin Pepić
- Birth name: Edin Sancaktar
- Date of birth: July 13, 1991 (age 35)
- Place of birth: Ratingen, Germany
- Height: 1.93 m (6 ft 4 in)
- Position: Goalkeeper

Senior career*
Years	Team	Apps	(Gls)
2010–2012	Fortuna Düsseldorf II	12	(0)
2012–2013	Borussia Dortmund II	2	(0)
2013–2014	FC 08 Homburg	29	(0)
2014–2015	Goslarer 08	13	(0)
2015–2019	Wattenscheid 09	111	(0)
2019–2020	Wuppertaler SV	10	(0)
- * Club domestic league appearances and goals as of 21:07, 3 January 2021 (UTC)

Edin Pepić (born 13 July 1991), previously known as Edin Sancaktar until 2019, is a German footballer who plays as a goalkeeper.

== Personal life ==
Pepić was born in Ratingen, North Rhine-Westphalia to Yugoslav immigrants to Germany, originally with the surname Sancaktar. When moving to Germany, his father had to change his surname from Pepić to Sancaktar. In 2019, he re-took his father's original surname "Pepić".
