= Aiden Leslie =

American pop singer-songwriter (born 1977)

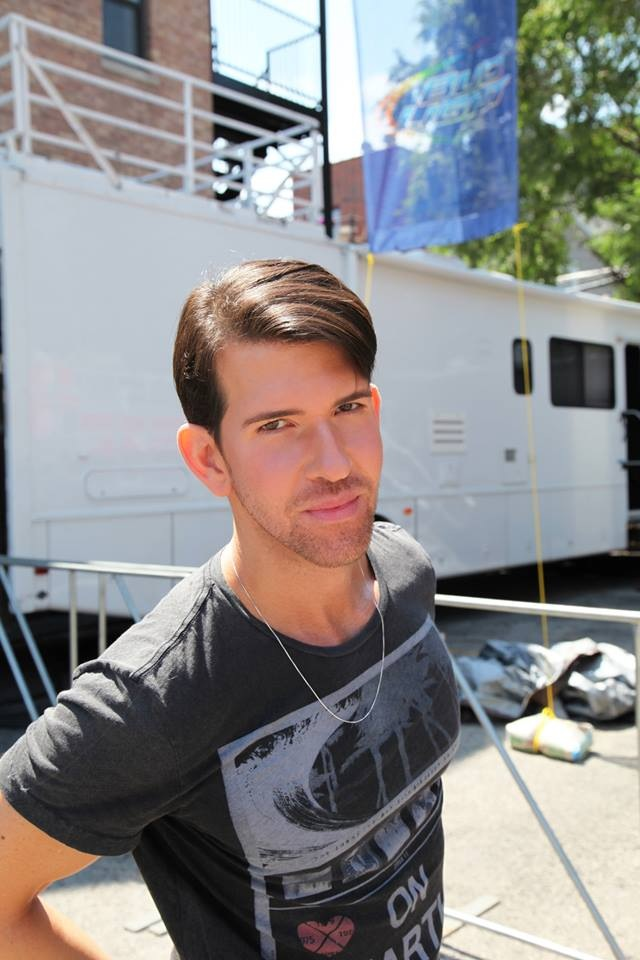

Background information
- Born: April 3, 1977 (age 49); Ohio, United States
- Genres: Pop, Dance
- Occupation: Singer-songwriter
- Instrument: Vocals
- Years active: 2005–present
- Website: Official website

Aiden Leslie (born April 3, 1977) is an American pop singer and songwriter. He received widespread recognition and acclaim after writing, recording, and performing "World's Away" in 2011. The song, featuring Farrah Burns, has been featured on VH-1 & MTV.

== Early life ==
Leslie was born in Ohio, where he attended the School for Creative and Performing Arts in Cincinnati. Shortly after graduating, he moved to New York City to pursue his music career. There he was cast in an off-Broadway play, during which he was introduced to an underground music scene he didn't know existed. It wasn't long before he became a fixture in the New York nightlife circuit, frequenting clubs like Palladium, Tunnel, Twilo, Roxy, and Jackie 60 to listen and dance to after-hour DJ's Junior Vasquez and Danny Tenaglia. He found that dance as well as music lacked the presence of strong male vocalists. "A lot of DJ's are simply not likely to play male artists on their dance floors. I think it’s time that has changed. I want to be a part of the movement to bring more guys to the dance floor".

He currently resides in New York City, living a private life.

== Career ==
Leslie released the first white label cover of Erasure's "Love to Hate You" in 2005 on JVM Music, remixed by Junior Vasquez.

As a songwriter, Leslie has become known for using his songs as personal diary entries. "Worlds Away" examines the aftermath of struggle and how people eventually reach the light at the end of the tunnel and grow from adversity. "Trying to Leave Now" looked at fighting feelings of the heart, leaving a love that the mind knows is not right. "Diamond Dreams" reflected on Aiden's story of coming to New York City six days after his high school graduation and how he grew from a boy to a man, navigating his way through the tough city streets, and seeking his dreams to become the performer he is today. This has become a reality as he has been steadily touring the country the last three years, playing to huge crowds in cities such as Chicago, Miami, New York City, Atlanta, Albany, and Columbus, opening for acts such as Wilson Phillips, 10,000 Maniacs, Debbie Gibson, Aaron Carter, and Kristine W to name just a few. "My fans are always my priority and meeting them makes it all worth it" says Leslie.

His newest track, "Nobody Said", continues his journey in search of life's ideal. It tackles a desire many (including Aiden Leslie) feel is even more out of reach: finding ultimate love.

Aiden Leslie's next release of Please on HMSP Music in 2006 met with favorable reviews.

Leslie released his breakout single "World's Away" in February 2011. "World's Away" rose to No. 1 on Masterbeat and No. 1 on Logo TV "Click List" for four consecutive weeks, and was broadcast in video rotation on MTV, VH1 and was released on iTunes and Amazon.com shortly after.

2011 saw the launch of Leslie's own record label, Ashea Records, which released his next single in July of that year. The pop anthem "Trying to Leave Now", charted number 1 on several pop/dance charts across the globe.

Leslie's next single "Diamond Dreams" was released in August 2012. Leslie's release for 2013 was "Nobody Said" issued in November of that year.

In 2015, during an interview with BWW Interviews he mentioned he was going to do New York City Parade and "Live Out Loud", a benefit helping LGBT teens connect with inspirational role models. He is vocal about LGBTQ+ issues and often shares his own experiences as a gay man. That year, he also released a music video, titled "I Just Go", a song about love, life, and mortality. In the same year, during the interview with Advocate, he mentioned his music influences, at a time, were Madonna, Pink, Taylor Clarkson, Sam Smith, and Taylor Swift.

== Awards ==
In 2012, Leslie was awarded Odyssey Magazine's Nightlife Best Male Vocalist. He was also nominated for the 2012 Odyssey Magazine's Nightlife Award – Best Male Performer as well as the Glam Award for Best Nightlife Performer.

== Discography ==
=== Singles ===
| Year | Title |
|---|---|
| 2006 | "Please" |
| 2011 | "World's Away" |
| 2011 | "Trying to Leave Now" |
| 2012 | "Diamond Dreams" |
| 2013 | "Nobody Said" |
