= Hayesville =

Hayesville may refer to:

- Hayesville, Iowa, a small city in Keokuk County, Iowa
- Hayesville, North Carolina, a town in Clay County, near the Georgia North Carolina border
- Hayesville, North Carolina (Township), One of 6 townships in Clay County, North Carolina
- Hayesville, Ohio, a village in Ashland County
- Hayesville, Pickaway County, Ohio, an unincorporated community
- Hayesville, Oregon, an unincorporated community in North West Oregon
- Hayesville, Pennsylvania, a populated area in Lower Oxford, Pennsylvania.
