= Hayes Township, Kearney County, Nebraska =

Hayes Township
- Township
- Location in Kearney County
- Coordinates: 40°29′06″N 099°00′39″W
- Country: United States
- State: Nebraska
- County: Kearney

Area
  - Total: 35.99 sq mi (93.21 km^{2})
  - Land: 35.99 sq mi (93.21 km^{2})
  - Water: 0 sq mi (0 km^{2}) 0%
- Elevation: 2,195 ft (669 m)

Population (2020)
  - Total: 1,676
  - Density: 46.57/sq mi (17.98/km^{2})
- GNIS feature ID: 0838053

Hayes Township is one of fourteen townships in Kearney County, Nebraska, United States. The population was 1,676 at the 2020 census. A 2021 estimate placed the township's population at 1,670.

A portion of the City of Minden lies within the Township.

== See also ==
- County government in Nebraska
