= Hayes Township, Custer County, Nebraska =

Hayes Township
- Township
- Location in Custer County
- Coordinates: 41°38′35″N 100°06′23″W
- Country: United States
- State: Nebraska
- County: Custer

Area
  - Total: 181.19 sq mi (469.28 km^{2})
  - Land: 181.19 sq mi (469.28 km^{2})
  - Water: 0 sq mi (0 km^{2}) 0%
- Elevation: 2,795 ft (852 m)

Population (2020)
  - Total: 32
  - Density: 0.18/sq mi (0.068/km^{2})
- GNIS feature ID: 0838052

Hayes Township is one of thirty-one townships in Custer County, Nebraska, United States. The population was 32 at the 2020 census. A 2021 estimate placed the township's population at 32.

== See also ==
- County government in Nebraska
