= Aidan Cross (priest) =

Dean of Bloemfontein (1918–1989)

Aidan Harrison Cross (5 January 1918 – 15 May 1989) was Dean of Bloemfontein from 1958 to 1982.

Educated at Michaelhouse, Leeds University, after the College of the Resurrection, Mirfield, his first posts were curacies at St John, Cinderford and St Saviour, Maritzburg. He was then Vicar of Karkloof until his time as Dean.
