= Edin Salkić =

Austrian footballer (born 1989)

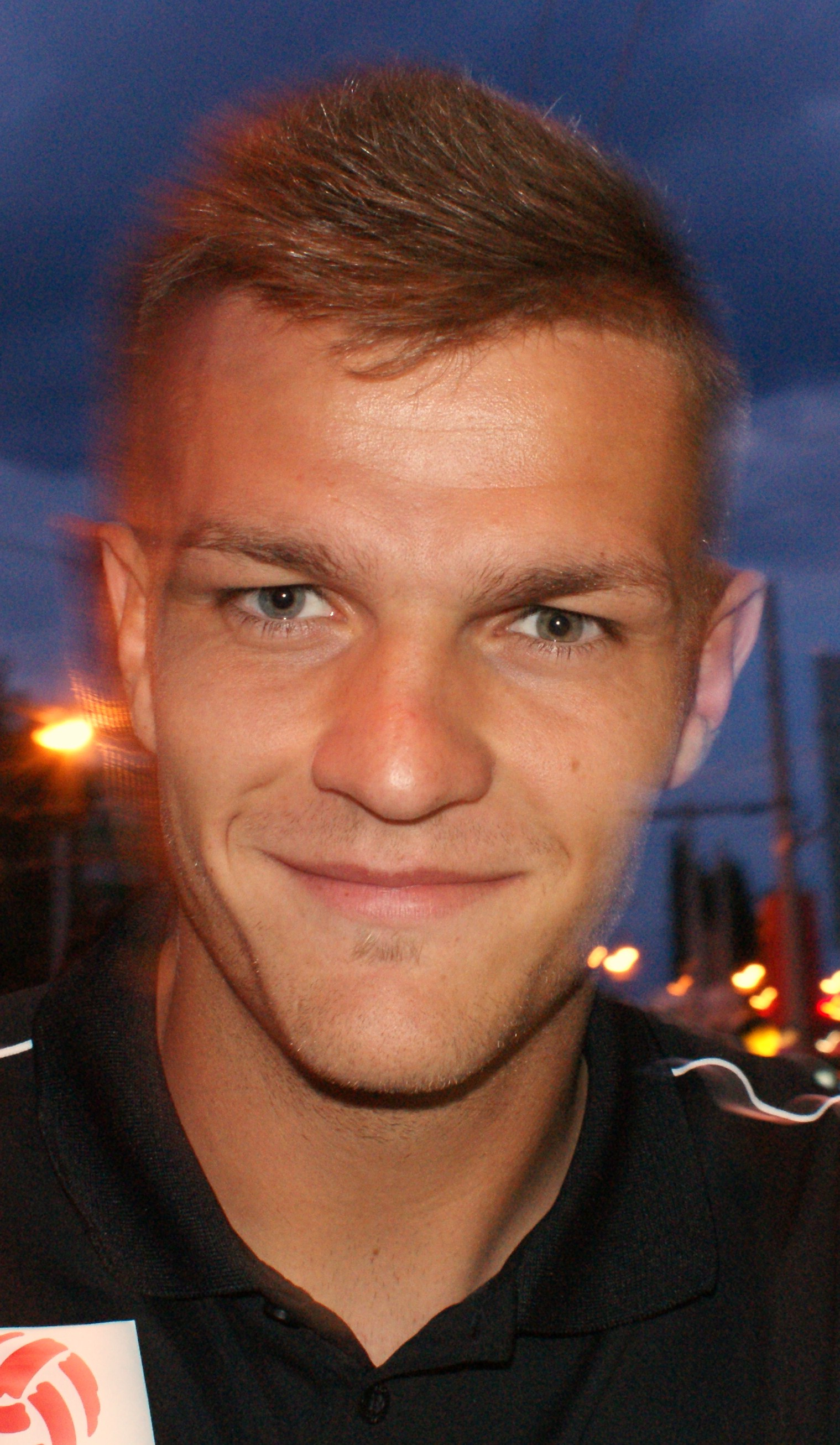
- Salkić with Sturm Graz

Personal information
- Date of birth: 16 June 1989 (age 37)
- Place of birth: SFR Yugoslavia
- Height: 1.97 m (6 ft 6 in)
- Position: Forward

Team information
- Current team: USV Kettlasbrunn
- Number: 63

Youth career
- 1996–2003: SC Liezen
- 2003–2005: Austria Wien

Senior career*
Years	Team	Apps	(Gls)
2005–2007	Austria Wien II	10	(0)
2007	→ DSV Leoben (loan)	2	(0)
2007–2008	SV Wienerberg	20	(1)
2008–2011	Sturm Graz II	17	(8)
2009–2011	Sturm Graz	3	(0)
2009–2010	→ Austria Lustenau (loan)	31	(9)
2010	→ TSV Hartberg (loan)	16	(2)
2011–2012	Wiener Neustadt	17	(0)
2012–2013	Floridsdorfer AC	27	(11)
2013–2014	SKN St. Pölten	10	(1)
2014	Hellas Kagran	4	(0)
2014–2016	ASV Vösendorf	23	(16)
2016–2017	Kremser SC	26	(20)
2017	ASK-BSC Bruck/Leitha	17	(10)
2018	Mauerwerk	11	(3)
2018–2019	SV Stripfing	10	(0)
2019–2020	SC Korneuburg	8	(2)
2020–2022	SV Neuaigen		
2022–	USV Kettlasbrunn		

International career
2007	Austria U19	4	(1)
- * Club domestic league appearances and goals

Edin Salkić (born 16 June 1989) is an Austrian footballer who plays as a forward for Austrian club USV Kettlasbrunn.

== Club career ==
Salkić spent his entire career in the Austrian leagues, playing for Wiener Neustadt at the country's top level.
