= Haden (name) =

Haden is both a surname and a given name. Notable people with the name include:

== Surname ==
- Andy Haden (1950–2020), New Zealand rugby union player
- Ben Haden, American minister in the Presbyterian Church
- Charles Harold Haden II (1937–2004), United States federal judge
- Charlie Haden (1937–2014), American jazz musician
- Sir Francis Seymour Haden, (1818-1910), English surgeon and etcher
- George Haden (1788–1856), British engineer and inventor
- J. V. Haden (dates unknown), English cricketer
- Jack Haden (1914–1996), American football player
- Joe Haden (born 1989), American footballer
- Josh Haden (born 1968), American jazz musician
- Nate Haden (born 1976), American actor
- Oliver Haden, British actor
- Pat Haden (born 1953), American football player, lawyer and athletic director
- Petra Haden (born 1971), American violinist and singer
- Rachel Haden (born 1971), American bass guitarist and singer
- Sam Haden (1902–1974), English soccer player
- Sara Haden (1899–1981), American character actress
- Tanya Haden (born 1971), American artist, cellist and singer

== Peerage ==
- Baron Haden-Guest, a title in the Peerage of the United Kingdom
  - Leslie Haden-Guest, 1st Baron Haden-Guest (1877–1960), British politician
    - David Haden-Guest (1911–1938), British communist and son of the 1st Baron
  - Peter Haden-Guest, 4th Baron Haden-Guest (1913–1996), British dancer, choreographer, diplomet, and son of the 1st Baron
  - Elisabeth Haden-Guest (1910–2002), German-British communist, 1st wife of the 4th Baron
  - Jean Haden-Guest, Lady Haden-Guest (1921–2017), American theatre director and television executive, 2nd wife of the 4th Baron
    - Anthony Haden-Guest (born 1937), British-American writer and artist, son of the 4th Baron
    - Nicholas Haden-Guest (born 1951), American actor, son of the 4th Baron
  - Christopher Haden-Guest, 5th Baron Haden-Guest (born 1948), American-British actor, director, and screenwriter, son of the 4th Baron
  - Jamie Lee Curtis, Lady Haden-Guest (born 1958), American actress, wife of the 5th Baron
    - Ruby Haden-Guest (born 1996), American-British computer gaming editor, daughter of the 4th Baron

== Given name ==
- Haden Edwards (1771–1849), Texas settler and land speculator
- Haden Harrison Edwards (1812–1864), Texan legislator, merchant soldier
- Haden Edward Knox (1937–2026), American politician from North Carolina

== Fictional characters ==
- David Haden, Executive ADA appearing on Law & Order: Special Victims Unit

== See also ==
- Hayden (given name)
- Hayden (surname)
