= Jean Haden-Guest, Lady Haden-Guest =

American theatre director and television executive

The Right Honourable The Lady Haden-Guest

Personal details
- Born: Genia Pauline Hindes; March 1, 1921 New York City, New York, U.S.
- Died: February 10, 2017 (aged 95) Santa Monica, California, U.S.
- Spouse: Peter Haden-Guest, 4th Baron Haden-Guest
- Children: 3, including Christopher and Nicholas
- Parent(s): Albert George Hindes; Freida Muldavin Sadvoronsky

Jean Pauline Haden-Guest, Baroness Haden-Guest (March 1, 1921 – February 10, 2017; née Genia Pauline Hindes) was an American theatre director and television executive. She was the Director of the American National Theater and Academy and served as the Vice President and Head of Talent at CBS. Haden-Guest was the second wife of Peter Haden-Guest, 4th Baron Haden-Guest.

== Early life and family ==
Haden-Guest was born Genia Pauline Hindes in New York City on March 1, 1921, to Russian Jewish immigrants Albert George Hindes and Freida Muldavin Sadvoronsky. She grew up being exposed to the arts and Russian and Jewish culture, and was influenced by the writings of Anton Chekhov. Her family spoke Yiddish, and she learned some of the language.

== Career ==
Lady Haden-Guest served as Director of the American National Theater and Academy, a non-profit theatre production agency, before working as a representative for actors at the firm Wender & Associates. Later she worked for CBS, where she became Vice President and Head of Talent.

== Personal life ==
Haden-Guest married The Honourable Peter Haden-Guest, a British ballet dancer and choreographer, in 1945. She was Peter Haden-Guest's second wife. Her husband was the fourth son of the politician Leslie Haden-Guest, 1st Baron Haden-Guest and a grandson of Colonel Albert Goldsmid, who founded the Jewish Lads' Brigade. Her husband, who later had a career as a diplomat, succeeded his brother as the 4th Baron Haden-Guest in 1987, thus making her a baroness.

Lady Haden-Guest and her husband had three children: Christopher Guest in 1948, Nicholas Guest in 1951, and Elissa Haden-Guest in 1953. She was also a stepmother to Lord Haden-Guest's son, Anthony Haden-Guest, with his first wife, Elisabeth Furse.

Lady Haden-Guest died on February 10, 2017, at her home in Santa Monica, California, at the age of 95.
