= David Guest (communist) =

British communist activist (1911–1938)

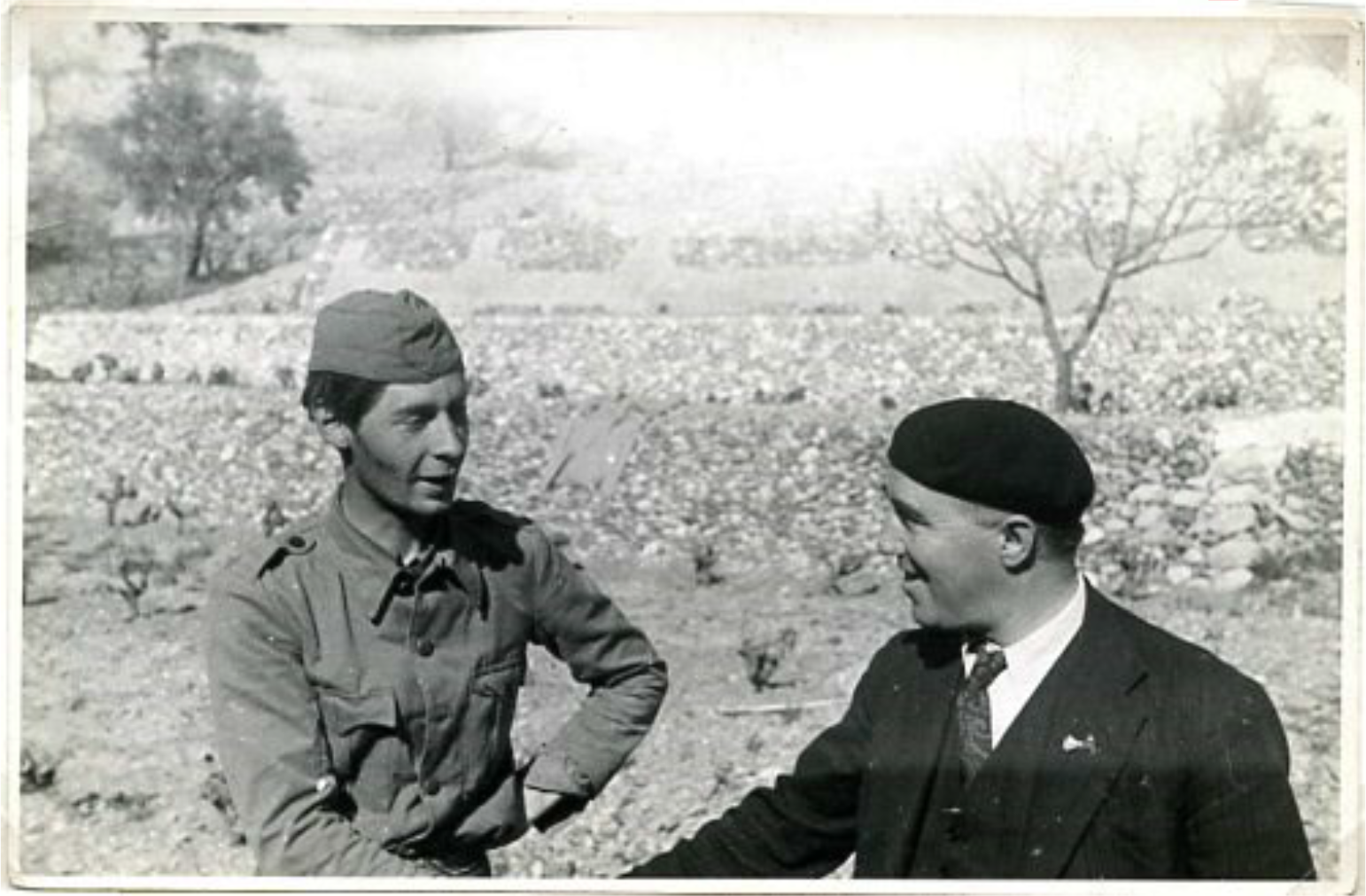
- David Guest (left) meets Harry Pollitt in Spain
- Born: David Haden-Guest; 6 January 1911
- Died: 26 July 1938 (aged 27); Gandesa, Spain
- Cause of death: Killed in action
- Resting place: Gandesa
- Education: Trinity College, Cambridge
- Occupations: Mathematician, philosopher
- Years active: 1931–1938
- Political party: Communist Party of Great Britain
- Partner: Suzanne McShane
- Parent(s): Leslie Haden-Guest, 1st Baron Haden-Guest & Muriel Ethel Carmel Goldsmid
- Relatives: Peter Haden-Guest, 4th Baron Haden-Guest (brother); Christopher Guest (nephew)
- Military service
- Allegiance: Spanish Republic
- Branch: International Brigades
- Units: British Battalion of the "Abraham Lincoln" XV International Brigade
- Conflicts: Spanish Civil War; Battle of the Ebro

David Guest (6 January 1911– 26 July 1938) was a British mathematician and Marxist philosopher who volunteered to fight for the Republicans in the Spanish Civil War and was killed in Spain in July 1938. He was the author of A Textbook of Dialectical Materialism, published posthumously in 1939.

== Biography ==
David Haden-Guest was the son of Leslie Haden-Guest (created 1st Baron Haden-Guest in 1950), a longtime Labour Party Member of Parliament, and Muriel Ethel Carmel Goldsmid, daughter of Albert Goldsmid (a pioneering Zionist as head of Hovevei Zion in Great Britain and Ireland) from the Goldsmid family of financiers.

David attended the Oundle School before entering Trinity College, Cambridge in 1929 to study mathematics. In 1930–31, he transferred to the University of Göttingen in Germany, where he witnessed the latter years of the Weimar Republic and the rise of the Nazi Party. He became involved in "anti-fascist activity". Arrested at a communist youth demonstration, he went on hunger strike and was released after two weeks. Upon his return to Cambridge, he joined the Communist Party in 1931. There, Guest led a party cell that included John Cornford, Guy Burgess, Donald Maclean, Victor Kiernan and James Klugmann. This enabled dons such as Maurice Dobb and J. D. Bernal to take a more discreet back seat. It was claimed that Guest would "stride into hall at Trinity wearing a hammer and sickle pin in his lapel." He participated in discussions at Cambridge's Moral Sciences Club. He graduated from the university in 1932 with first-class honours in mathematics.

In 1933, Guest moved to Battersea, South London, where he became active in the Young Communist League and joined the shop workers union. He ran the Communist Party's "People's Bookshop" in Lavender Hill. He also offered lectures on dialectical materialism at the Marx Memorial Workers' School in Clerkenwell Green. In May 1935, he organised a Youth Peace Parade of 50 young people, some dressed as nurses, others with gas masks and with stretchers, to warn of war. For a short period, he taught at a secondary school for English-speaking children in Moscow, but returned to England to lecture in mathematics at University College in Southampton.

In 1938, he left his job as lecturer at University College to volunteer for the International Brigades fighting in Spain. He wrote of his decision:

Today we have certainly entered a period of crisis, when the arguments of "normal times" no longer apply, when considerations of most immediate usefulness come in. That is why I have decided to take the opportunity of going to Spain.

He arrived in Spain on 31 March 1938 and joined the British Battalion of the International Brigades. He saw action at the Battle of the Ebro, which began on 25 July 1938. A day later, on 26 July, a sniper killed Guest on Hill 481 at Gandesa, allegedly while Guest was reading a newspaper.

After his death, Guest's lecture notes at the Marx Memorial Workers' School were compiled by Thomas A. Jackson into the volume, A Textbook of Dialectical Materialism, published in 1939. In a blurb for the book, Professor J. D. Bernal called it "the best short study of dialectical materialism that has appeared in English".

== Publications ==
- Guest, David (1939). Jackson, Thomas A. (ed.). A Textbook of Dialectical Materialism. International Publishers. LCCN 40004337. Republished in 1963 as Lectures on Marxist Philosophy.
