= Neil Stuart Martin =

British Jewish community leader and youth charity executive

Neil Stuart Martin CBE
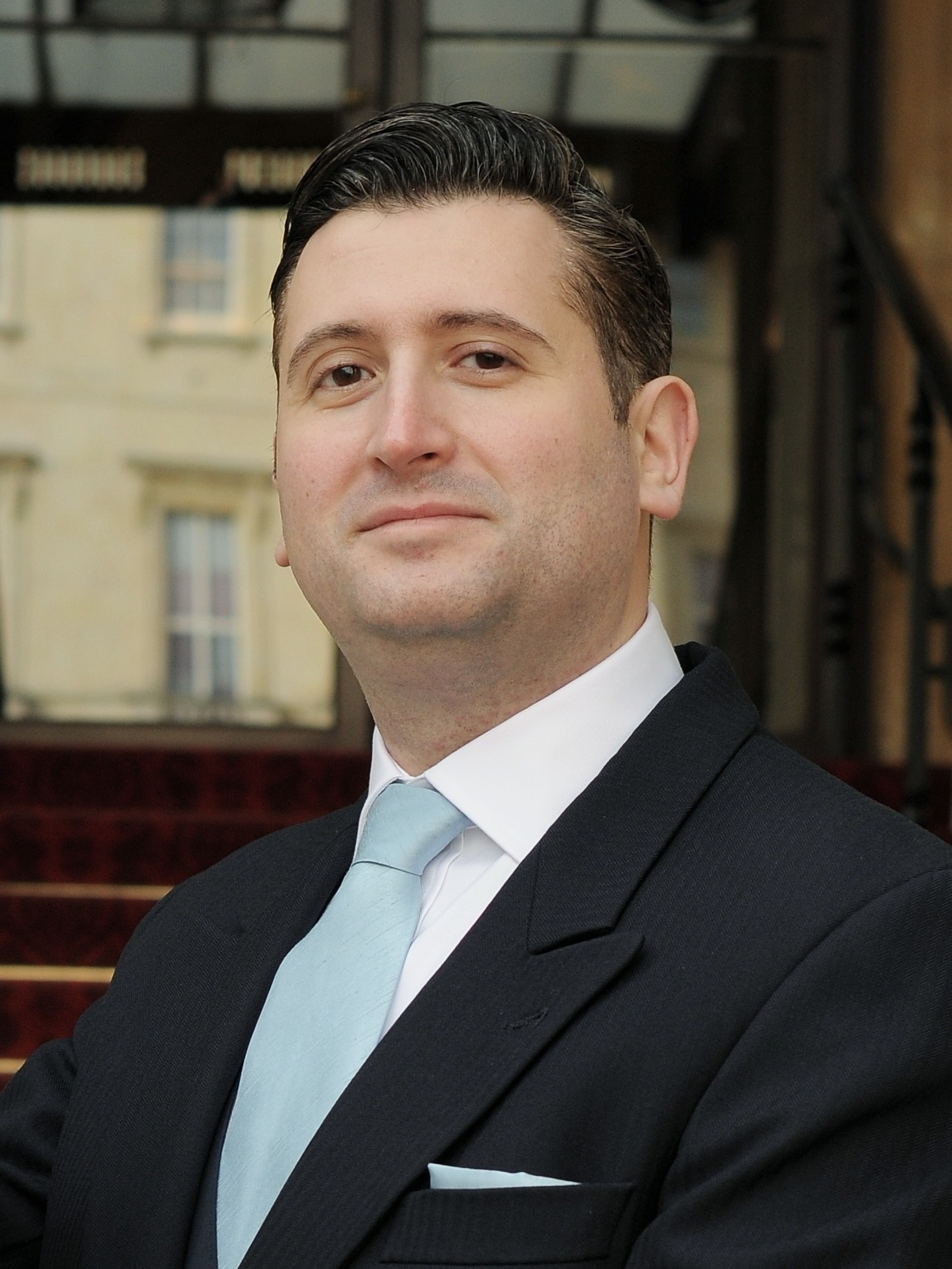
- Born: August 1978 (age 48); Essex, United Kingdom
- Occupation: Chief Executive of Jewish Lads' and Girls' Brigade

Neil Stuart Martin CBE (born August 1978) is a British Jewish community leader and youth charity executive. He has been Chief Executive of the Jewish Lads' and Girls' Brigade (JLGB) since 2005, and is Chair of Yom HaShoah UK and the Interfaith Youth Trust.

He was appointed an Officer of the Order of the British Empire (OBE) in 2016 for services to young people and interfaith relations, and was subsequently elevated to Commander of the Order of the British Empire (CBE) in the 2026 New Year Honours for national services to young people, interfaith relations and Holocaust remembrance.

== Early life and education ==
Martin was raised in Gants Hill, Essex. He attended Ilford Jewish Primary School and Beis Shammai Grammar School. At university he achieved a BSc and MA in Software, Arts and Media.

Before his OBE, Martin was recognised in May 2015 as number three on the Jewish News *Forty Under 40* list of young leaders contributing to British Jewish communal life.

== Career ==
=== Jewish Lads' and Girls' Brigade ===
Martin was appointed Chief Executive of the Jewish Lads' and Girls' Brigade (JLGB) in April 2005. During his tenure, he has overseen the charity’s development into a national provider of culturally sensitive youth provision, expanding access to volunteering, leadership and skills programmes for young people from minority and faith communities.

In 2020, as part of JLGB's 125th anniversary, Martin secured royal patronage for the organisation from Charles, then Prince of Wales, marking a significant milestone in the charity's national profile and civic recognition.

Following his accession to the throne, King Charles III reaffirmed his patronage of JLGB as part of his announced continuation of selected charitable affiliations.

Under Martin's leadership, JLGB expanded their adapted Duke of Edinburgh’s Award programmes to ensure kosher and Sabbath-compliant expeditions, and established partnerships with national youth organisations including the #iwill Campaign and the Youth United Foundation.

=== Awards and Recognition ===
In 2013, JLGB received the Civil Society Charity Award in the Children and Youth category for its interfaith National Citizen Service provision. JLGB's Interfaith National Citizen Service programme was independently evaluated by youth sector researcher Maxine Green, whose 2013 report highlighted its effectiveness in delivering inclusive, faith-sensitive youth engagement and social action outcomes.

In 2022, during Martin's tenure, JLGB was one of 20 organisations nationally to receive the special Queen Elizabeth II Platinum Jubilee Volunteering Award, a one-off addition to the Queen's Award for Voluntary Service recognising charities that empower young people across the UK. A reception for the awardees, attended by HRH The Princess Royal, highlighted the exceptional work of national charities supporting young people aged 16–25.

=== COVID-19 response ===
During the COVID-19 pandemic, Martin created JLGB Virtual, a daily digital youth platform launched in March 2020 to provide continuity of youth engagement during the national lockdown. The programme ran for nearly two years and was delivered entirely online via live broadcasts and interactive sessions.

Each evening, young people hosted activities and interviewed a guest drawn from public life, entertainment, politics and the community sector. Guests included Ashley James, Wes Streeting, Lord Robert Winston, Ben Winston, Craig David, Rachel Riley, Brent Spiner, Bob Saget, Alan Menken, Jamie Lee Curtis and Christopher Guest, whose great-grandfather, Colonel Albert E. W. Goldsmid MVO, founded the Jewish Lads' Brigade in 1895.

Across its run, JLGB Virtual featured more than 150 guests and attracted an audience reported to exceed three million views.

=== Yom HaShoah UK ===
Since 2011, Martin has been Chair of Yom HaShoah UK, the umbrella body coordinating Holocaust remembrance across the United Kingdom for the UK Jewish community. He has overseen large-scale national commemorations, including civic ceremonies and digital remembrance initiatives during the COVID-19 pandemic.

In May 2016, Martin organised the national Yom HaShoah commemorative event at Barnet Copthall Stadium, which was attended by several thousand members of the Jewish community, including more than 150 Holocaust survivors. The gathering, reported to be the largest ever UK Holocaust remembrance event at that time with around 5,000 attendees, was chosen by the newly elected Mayor of London, Sadiq Khan, as his first public engagement in office.

In April 2025, he produced the UK’s national 80th anniversary commemoration of the liberation of Bergen-Belsen by the British Armed Forces, held in Victoria Tower Gardens, London, adjacent to Parliament.

=== Interfaith and civic roles ===
Martin is Chair of the Interfaith Youth Trust, which provides grant funding to grassroots interfaith youth projects across the United Kingdom. He is also a trustee of the Youth United Foundation and formerly was a trustee of the National Council for Voluntary Youth Services (NCVYS).

== Honours ==

Commander of the Order of the British Empire (2026)

Officer of the Order of the British Empire (2016)

== Personal interests ==
Martin has spoken publicly about the influence of popular culture on his leadership outlook, including the work of Jim Henson and franchises such as The Muppets and Transformers: Generation 1, which he has cited as formative in shaping ideas of leadership, resilience and imagination.
