= Nicholas Guest =

American actor (born 1951)

The Honourable Nicholas Guest
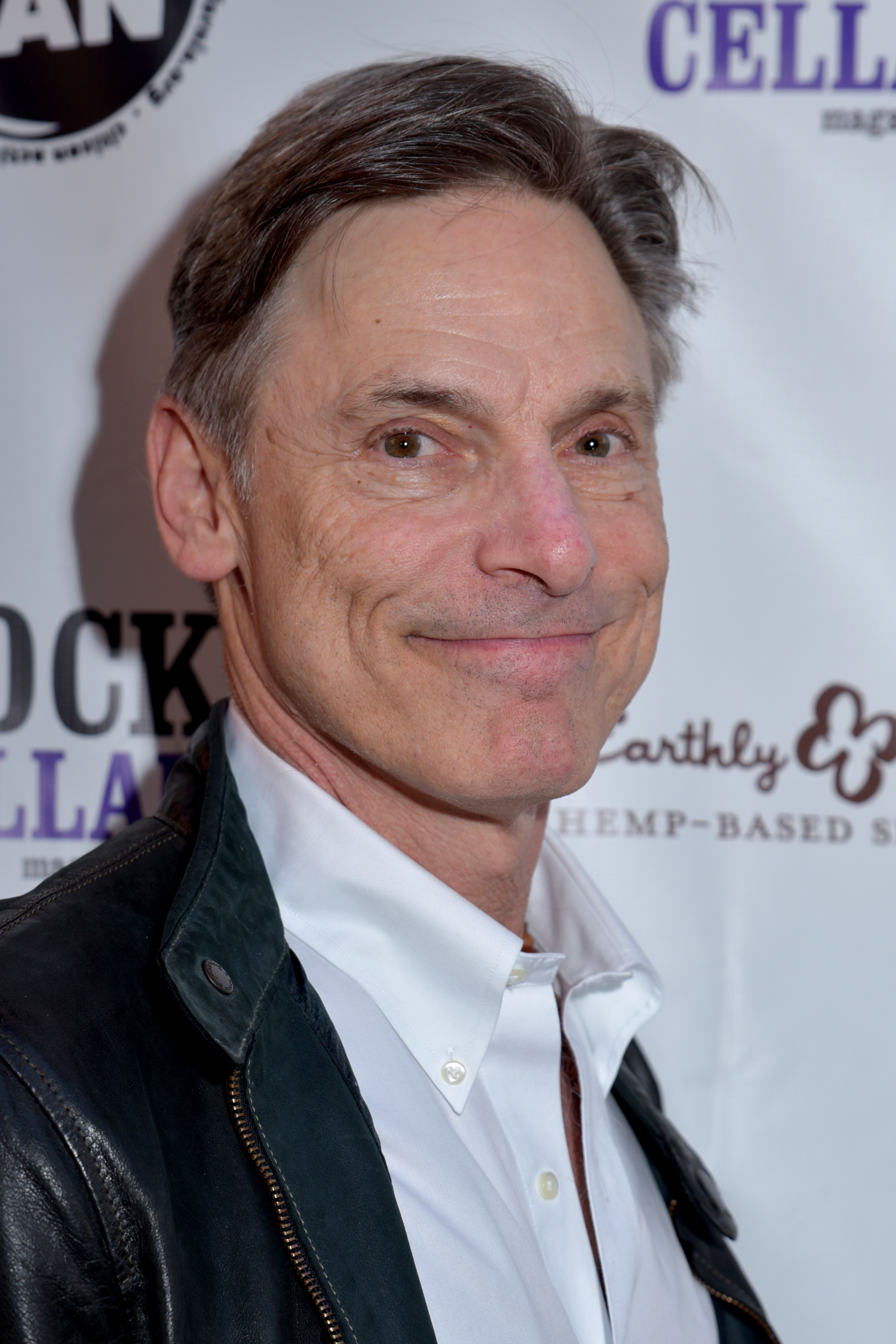
- Guest in 2019
- Born: May 5, 1951 (age 75); New York City, U.S.
- Occupation: Actor
- Years active: 1978–present
- Spouses: Jill Ellen Demby (m. 1980; div. 1989) Pamela Ann Seamon (m. 1989)
- Children: 2
- Parents: The 4th Baron Haden-Guest (father); Jean Pauline Hindes (mother)
- Relatives: Christopher Guest (brother); Elissa Haden Guest (sister); Anthony Haden-Guest (half-brother); Jamie Lee Curtis (sister-in-law)

Nicholas Haden-Guest (born May 5, 1951), known as Nicholas Guest, is an American actor who has appeared in various movie and television roles, including that of headmaster Patrick James Elliot in the teen sitcom USA High. Since 2000, he has primarily worked as a voice actor.

== Personal life ==
Guest was born in New York City, the son of Peter Haden-Guest, a British United Nations diplomat who later became the 4th Baron Haden-Guest, and his second wife, Jean Pauline Hindes, a former vice president of casting at CBS. Guest's maternal grandparents were Jewish immigrants from Russia. His paternal grandfather, Leslie Haden-Guest, was a Labour Party politician who was a convert to Judaism, and his paternal grandmother's father was Colonel Albert Goldsmid, a British officer who founded the Jewish Lads' and Girls' Brigade and the Maccabaeans. Both of Guest's parents were atheists, and Guest had no religious upbringing.

Nicholas Guest spent parts of his childhood in the United Kingdom. He is the brother of actor Christopher Guest and writer Elissa Haden Guest, the brother-in-law of actress Jamie Lee Curtis and the half brother of the British-American writer Anthony Haden-Guest.

Guest married Jill Ellen Demby on May 11, 1980 and they divorced in 1989. With Demby he had his first daughter. On November 26, 1989, he married Pamela Ann Guest (née Seamon), an actress and casting director, with whom he had his second daughter.

== Filmography ==
=== Television ===
Year	Title	Role	Notes
1993	Animaniacs	Paul	Voice, episode: "Puttin' on the Blitz"
1999–2000	Roughnecks: Starship Troopers Chronicles	Zander Barcalow	Voice, recurring role
1999	Godzilla: The Series	Chad Gordon	Voice, episode: "Freeze"
2000	Batman Beyond	Jack	Voice, episode: "King's Ransom"
2001	Rave Master	Hebi	Voice, 3 episodes (English dub)
2001	Power Rangers Time Force	Taylor	3 episodes
2001–2003	The Mummy	Ardeth Bay	Voice, recurring role
2002	The Zeta Project	Dr. Jacobs	Voice, episode: "The Wrong Morph"
2003	The Big O	Army Police	Voice, English dub; episode: "The War of Paradigm City"
2003	Justice League	Bill Brooks	Voice, episode: "Only a Dream" Pt. 1
2004	Static Shock	Scientist #2	Voice, episode: "No Man's an Island"
2005	Justice League Unlimited	Dino Trooper	Voice, episode: "Chaos at the Earth's Core"
2006	Ben 10	Clancy	Voice, episode: "Side Effects"
2008–2011	Sons of Anarchy	John Teller	Recurring role
2009–2011	Batman: The Brave and the Bold	Martian Manhunter, Question	Voice, 8 episodes
2010	Ben 10: Ultimate Alien	Simons	Voice, 1 episodes
2015	Sleepy Hollow	William Howe	2 episodes
2016-2019	Madam Secretary	President Salnikov	3 episodes
2017-2018	MacGyver	Robot	Voice, 2 episodes
2025	The American Revolution	Additional Voices	4 episodes

=== Film ===
Year	Title	Role	Notes
1980	The Long Riders	Robert Ford	
1982	Star Trek II: The Wrath of Khan	Cadet	
1983	Trading Places	Harry	
1984	Cloak & Dagger	Taxi Driver	
1984	Nausicaä of the Valley of the Wind	Additional voices	2005 English dub
1988	Appointment with Death	Lennox Boynton	
1989	National Lampoon's Christmas Vacation	Todd Chester	
1989	Tunnels	Ron Bellard	
1993	Brainsmasher... A Love Story	Detective Smith	
1993	The Joy Luck Club	Hairdresser	
1994	Kickboxer 4	Casey Ford	
1994	Puppet Master 5: The Final Chapter	Tom Hendy	
1995	The Land Before Time III: The Time of the Great Giving	Hyp's Father	Voice, direct-to-video
1996	The Late Shift	Robert Iger	
1998	Twice Upon a Time	Bed and Breakfast Manager	
2001	Cowboy Bebop: The Movie	Rasheed	Voice
2003	Terminator 3: Rise of the Machines	Additional voices	
2003	The Tale of Despereaux	Additional voices	
2005	Racing Stripes	Additional voices	
2006	Barnyard	Additional voices	
2006	Over the Hedge	Additional voices	
2008	Fly Me to the Moon	Fly Buddy	Voice
2009	Astro Boy	French Waiter Robot	Voice
2010	Dante's Inferno: An Animated Epic	Demon Priest	Voice
2010	Tangled	Additional voices	
2011	Rio	Additional voices	
2012	ParaNorman	Hippie Ghost, Mobster Ghost	Voice
2013	Frozen	Additional voices	
2013	Saving Santa	Blitzen, Shortbeard	Voice
2014	Big Hero 6	Additional voices	
2014	Mr. Peabody & Sherman	French Peasants	Voice
2014	Penguins of Madagascar	Flight Attendant	Voice
2018	Scooby-Doo! & Batman: The Brave and the Bold	Martian Manhunter	Voice, direct-to-video

=== Video games ===
Year	Title	Role	Notes
1993	Freddy Pharkas: Frontier Pharmacist	Srini Lalkala Bagdnish, Hop Singh	
2000	Vampire: The Masquerade – Redemption	Christof Romuald	
2000	Ground Control	M, additional voices	
2002	Star Trek: Bridge Commander	Lt. Felix Savalai	
2002	Blood Omen 2	Marcus	
2003	Arc the Lad: Twilight of the Spirits	Windalf	
2005	SWAT 4	Hadeon Koshka, Gary Altman, Highground	
2007	Ben 10: Protector of Earth	Clancy	
2008	Speed Racer: The Videogame	Gothorm Danneskjold, Gray Ghost	
2016	Titanfall 2	General Marder	

=== Music video ===
- 1989 - "Janie's Got a Gun" by Aerosmith - Father
