= Leslie Haden-Guest, 1st Baron Haden-Guest =

British politician (1877–1960)

The Right Honourable The Lord Haden-Guest MC
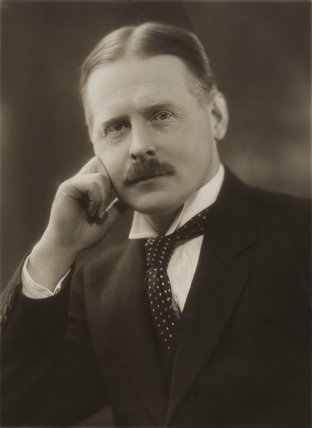
- Haden-Guest in 1922

Member of the House of Lords
- Lord Temporal
- In office 2 February 1950 – 20 August 1960
- Preceded by: Peerage created
- Succeeded by: Stephen Haden-Guest, 2nd Baron Haden-Guest

Lord-in-waiting Government Whip
- In office 13 February 1951 – 26 October 1951

Member of Parliament for Islington North
- In office 13 October 1937 – 2 February 1950
- Preceded by: Albert Goodman
- Succeeded by: Moelwyn Hughes

Member of Parliament for Southwark North
- In office 6 December 1923 – 10 March 1927
- Preceded by: Edward Strauss
- Succeeded by: Edward Strauss

Personal details
- Born: 10 March 1877 Oldham, Lancashire, England
- Died: 20 August 1960 (aged 83)
- Party: Labour
- Relations: Christopher Guest (Grandson)
- Children: Stephen, 2nd Baron Haden-Guest; Richard, 3rd Baron Haden-Guest; David Haden-Guest; Peter, 4th Baron Haden-Guest
- Education: Owens College, Manchester

Military service
- Allegiance: British Empire
- Branch/service: British Army
- Rank: Major
- Unit: Royal Army Medical Corps
- Battles/wars: Second Boer War; World War I World War II

Leslie Haden-Guest, 1st Baron Haden-Guest, MC (10 March 1877 – 20 August 1960), was a British author, journalist, doctor and Labour Party politician.

== Early life ==
Haden-Guest was born in Oldham, Lancashire, England, the son of Catharine Anna (née Johnson) and Alexander Haden-Guest, a doctor and surgeon of Manchester who was an active worker for the Left. He was educated first at William Hulme's Grammar School, then studied medicine at Owens College, Manchester and the London Hospital.

== Career ==
Haden-Guest served in the Royal Army Medical Corps in the Boer War, World War I, and World War II, being awarded the Military Cross. He was the founder of the Anglo-French Committee of the Red Cross. He was a member of the London County Council for Woolwich East (1919–1922).

He was a Labour Member of Parliament (MP) for Southwark North from 1923 until 1927 when he resigned in protest at Labour's opposition to sending troops to Shanghai. He unsuccessfully contested Wycombe in the 1931 election, but succeeded in Islington North at the 1937 by-election where he remained an MP until 1950 upon his elevation to the peerage.

Haden-Guest founded the Labour Party Commonwealth Group, and was a member of the Anderson Committee whose work led to the development of the Government's Evacuation Scheme during summer 1938.

During the Second World War Haden-Guest contributed to a social survey published by the Fabian Society regarding evacuation. He recommended that school meals and milk should be supplied irrespective of the financial circumstances of the parents. He argued that to discriminate on grounds of income would be 'socially and psychologically disastrous'.

=== Peerage ===
Haden-Guest was created a peer on 2 February 1950 as Baron Haden-Guest, of Saling in the County of Essex, and was a Lord-in-waiting to the King (February–October 1951), and thereafter an Assistant Opposition Whip in the House of Lords.

== Personal life ==
In 1898, he married Edith, daughter of Max Low of London, by whom he had two sons, Stephen and Richard. The couple divorced in 1909 and in 1910 he married Muriel Carmel, the daughter of Albert Goldsmid. They had two sons, David, who was killed in the Spanish Civil War, and Peter; and a daughter, Angela. His third marriage was in 1944 to Edith Edgar MacQueen, daughter of George MacQueen, who was the first woman to be granted a Ph.D. by the University of St Andrews. He was the grandfather of actor, writer, director, and musician Christopher Guest, who is now the 5th Baron, as well as the writer Anthony Haden-Guest.

Haden-Guest converted to Judaism before his marriage to Muriel Goldsmid, his second wife. He renounced Judaism in 1924. He was the first Jew to stand for Parliament as a Labour candidate.

Bertrand Russell described Haden-Guest as "a theosophist with a fiery temper and a considerable libido" and "very anti-Bolshevik".

== Works ==
- The Struggle for Power in Europe 1917-1921: An Outline Economic and Political Survey of the Central States and Russia (1921)

== Arms ==
Coat of arms of Leslie Haden-Guest, 1st Baron Haden-Guest
Crest A caladrius displayed Sable, beaked, legged and charged on the breast with a sun in splendour Or. Escutcheon Sable two flaunches Or, three Welsh triple harps in fess counter-changed. Supporters Dexter: a leopard Sable semée of roundels and grasping in the interior paw a quill Or; Sinister: a leopard Or semée of roundels and grasping in the interior paw a quill Sable. Motto "NON NOBIS SOLUM NATI SUMUS" (Not for ourselves alone do we come into the world).

Parliament of the United Kingdom
Preceded by Edward Strauss	Member of Parliament for Southwark North; 1923–1927	Succeeded by Edward Strauss
Preceded by Albert Goodman	Member of Parliament for Islington North; 1937–1950	Succeeded by Moelwyn Hughes
Peerage of the United Kingdom
New creation	Baron Haden-Guest; 1950–1960; Member of the House of Lords (1950–1960)	Succeeded by Stephen Haden-Guest
