= The Beyman Bros =

- Genres: Folk, jam band, acoustic, Americana
- Labels: Dharma Moon
- Members: Christopher Guest; David Nichtern; C.J. Vanston
- Website: www.thebeymanbros.com

The Beyman Bros are Christopher Guest, David Nichtern and C.J. Vanston. Their music is an instrumental mix of Americana, bluegrass and jazz elements. A full-length release, Memories of Summer as a Child, was released on January 20, 2009 on Dharma Moon.

Guest is known for This Is Spinal Tap, as is Vanston, who was the musical director for Spinal Tap, and Nichtern wrote Midnight at the Oasis for Maria Muldaur. Guest and Nichtern were childhood friends and have been playing music together for decades. They played together when they were in college in a band called Voltaire's Nose.

== Lineup ==
- Christopher Guest (mandolin, mandocello, clarinet, guitars, lap steel guitar)
- David Nichtern (acoustic, electric, and slide guitars)
- C.J. Vanston (keyboards, accordion, synths, and drum programming)

== Discography ==
Memories of Summer as a Child

Studio album
- Released: January 20, 2009
- Label: Dharma Moon

Their debut album, Memories of Summer as a Child was released in 2009. Nichtern recalled when they initially started to work on Memories, the group began with "simple rhythm-guitar ideas", and "once they arrived at an intriguing mood, they'd go off exploring". Guest said "most of the music was recorded in a matter of about a week ... much of it improvised in the studio". In the liner notes for the album, Guest describes the music as "Celtic/Rodeo, or Tyrolean/Sephardic".

== Reception ==
Music critic Tom Moon from NPR's All Things Considered said their album had a "striking, spacious sound: instrumentals that exude the placid calm of meditation music, but also carry flashes of rock-guitar brilliance, late-night swamp blues and the carefully knit tapestries of bluegrass ... it's thinking person's Americana — lovely and low-key and enchanting". Randy Lewis wrote in the Los Angeles Times that "there's little in the way of instrumental fireworks, just free-ranging exchanges in which the players challenge one another imaginatively and melodically". Jim Abbott from the Orlando Sentinel said the "11 gentle instrumentals are closer to New Age music ... tempos are utterly unhurried, and the subtle percussion allows plenty of space for the trio's wistful melodies".
