= Elissa Haden Guest =

American author

The Honourable Elissa Haden Guest
- Born: 1953 (age 72–73); United States
- Occupation: Author
- Parents: The 4th Baron Haden-Guest (father); Jean Pauline Hindes (mother)
- Relatives: Christopher Guest (brother); Nicholas Guest (brother); Anthony Haden-Guest (half-brother); Jamie Lee Curtis (sister-in-law)

Elissa Haden Guest (born 1953) is an American author of children's books.

Her 2000 book Iris and Walter received a starred review from Publishers Weekly.

Her parents were Peter Haden-Guest and Genia Pauline Hindes, also known as Jean Haden-Guest. Her brothers, Christopher Guest and Nicholas Guest, work in the film industry.

== Selected works ==
- Over the Moon. William Morrow & Company, 1986.
- Iris and Walter. Illustrated by Christine Davenier. Harcourt, 2000.
- Iris and Walter: True Friends. Illustrated by Christine Davenier. Gulliver Books, 2001.
- Iris and Walter: The Sleepover. Illustrated by Christine Davenier. Gulliver/Harcourt, 2002.
- Iris and Walter and Baby Rose. Illustrated by Christine Davenier. Harcourt Children's Books, 2002.
- Iris and Walter and Cousin Howie. Illustrated by Christine Davenier. Gulliver Books, 2003.
- Iris and Walter: The School Play. Illustrated by Christine Davenier. Gulliver/Harcourt, 2003.
- Iris and Walter: Lost and Found. Illustrated by Christine Davenier. Gulliver Books, 2004.
- Harriet’s Had Enough! Illustrated by Paul Meisel. Candlewick, 2009.
- Who's My Cupcake? Illustrated by Marina Fedotova. Little Simon, 2011.
- Bella's Rules. Illustrated by Abigail Halpin. Dial Books, 2013.
- Baby Builders. Illustrated by Hiroe Nakata. Dial Books, 2020.
