= Christine Davenier =

French author and illustrator of children's books

Christine Davenier is a French author and illustrator of children's books. She has illustrated a large number of books, the authors of which include Jack Prelutsky, Julie Andrews and her daughter Emma Walton Hamilton, Madeleine L'Engle, and Juanita Havill, and has received critical acclaim.

== Biography ==
Davenier was born in 1961 in Tours, France. She described her grandmother (from whom she received a box of watercolor paints as a gift at the age of fourteen) as a major artistic inspiration for her.

== Reception ==
Deborah Stevenson of The Bulletin of the Center for Children's Books praised her watercolor illustrations for Leon and Albertine, stating that they possess an "apparent carelessness adding to the feeling of movement". A review in Publishers Weekly praised "Davenier's luminous watercolors and vivid characterizations" in Just Like a Baby. The First Thing My Mama Told Me, written by Susan Marie Swanson and illustrated by Davenier, was a 2003 Charlotte Zolotow Award Honor Book.

== Selected works ==
- Leon and Albertine (written and illustrated by Davenier)
- The Very Fairy Princess (Written by Julie Andrews and Emma Walton Hamilton)
- Miss Lina's Ballerinas (Written by Grace Maccarone)
- Sally Jean, the Bicycle Queen (Written by Cari Best)
- I Love the Rain (Written by Margaret Park Bridges)
- Iris and Walter series (Written by Elissa Haden Guest)
- Mabel Dancing (Written by Amy Hest)
- I Heard It from Alice Zucchini: Poems About the Garden (Written by Jaunita Havill)
- Just Like a Baby (Written by Juanita Havill)
- Piper Reed series (Written by Kimberly Willis Holt)
  - Piper Reed Gets a Job
  - Piper Reed: The Great Gypsy
  - Piper Reed: Navy Brat
- Mr. and Mrs. Portly and Their Little Dog, Snack (Written by Sandra Jordan)
- The Other Dog (Written by Madeleine L'Engle)
- Has Anyone Seen My Emily Greene (Written by Norma Fox Mazer)
- Me I Am! (Written by Jack Prelutsky)
- Full Moon Barnyard Dance (Written by Carole Lexa Schaefer)
- The First Thing My Mama Told Me (Written by Susan Marie Swanson)
- Nobody Here But Me (Written by Judith Viorst)
- A Day with Miss Lina's Ballerinas (Written by Grace Maccarone)
