= Noah Becker =

American artist and writer (born 1970)

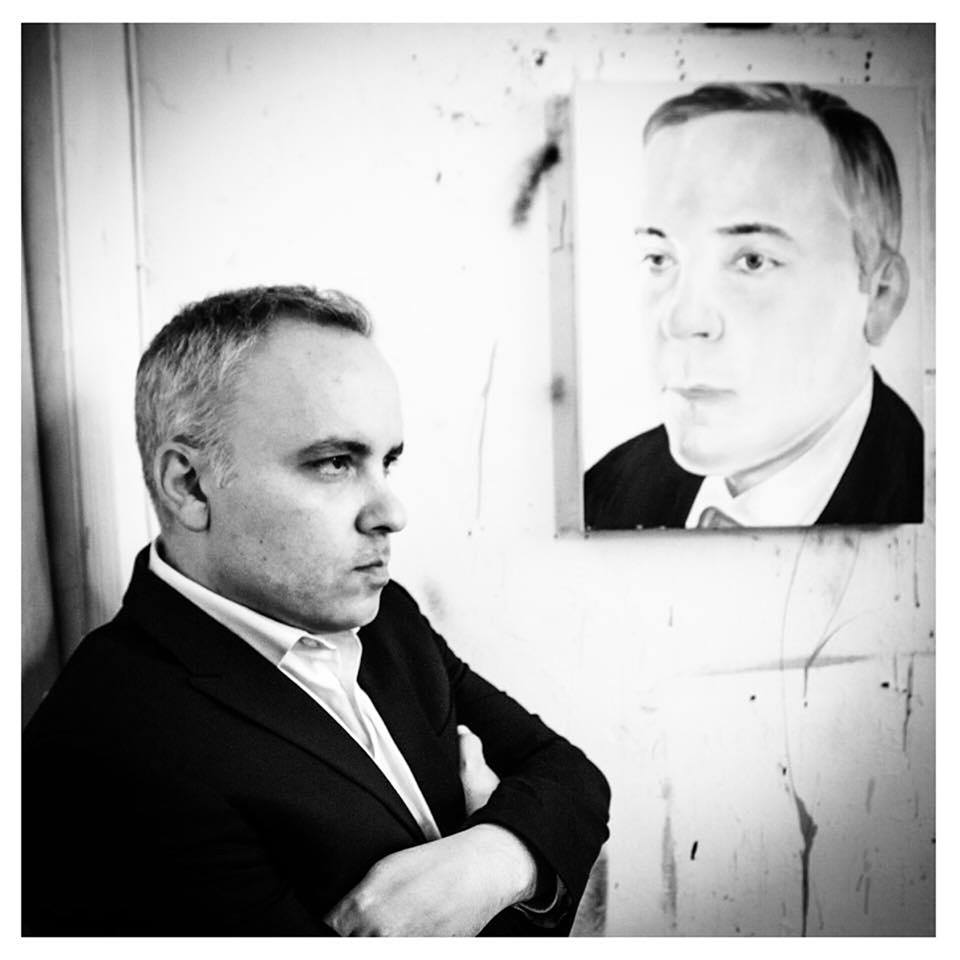
- Born: 1970 (age 55–56); Cleveland, Ohio, U.S.
- Citizenship: (dual) American and Canadian
- Occupations: Artist, painter, art writer, publisher, musician
- Musical career
- Genre: Jazz
- Instrument: saxophone
- Website: noahbeckerart.com

Noah Becker (born 1970) is an American and Canadian artist, writer, publisher of Whitehot Magazine of Contemporary Art, and jazz saxophonist who lives and works in New York City and Vancouver Island. He has written for Art in America, Canadian Art, VICE, Interview, The Guardian (UK), and the HuffPost.

== Early life and education ==
Becker was born in Cleveland, Ohio, United States, and grew up on a 40-acre farm on Thetis Island, off the coast of British Columbia, Canada. He moved with his family to Victoria, British Columbia, at the age of 15, after their house burned down. He had little early formal education and did not attend high school. He was a student at Victoria College of Art, and completed a year studying saxophone at Humber College, before moving to New York in 2004, where he befriended saxophonist Ornette Coleman in 2011. Becker made a short film with Coleman available to watch on YouTube.

== Whitehot Magazine of Contemporary Art ==
Becker is the founder and editor-in-chief of Whitehot Magazine of Contemporary Art, an online contemporary art magazine that was established in 2005. Becker has published more than 700 art writers, generating in excess of 6,500 articles on contemporary art in the magazine. Notable art writers and critics who have written in the past or currently write for Whitehot Magazine include Shana Nys Dambrot, Paul Laster, Donald Kuspit and Anthony Haden-Guest Becker has interviewed or collaborated with hundreds of prominent contemporary artists, among them Frank Stella, Neo Rauch and Spencer Tunick.

The Best Art in the World: 20 Years of Noah Becker's Whitehot Magazine – a 200-page hardcover compilation of 80 articles from Whitehot will be published internationally by Anthem Press in July 2025.

The book features interviews and reviews. Selected interviews in the book are with collector Beth Rudin DeWoody, Bill Viola, Spencer Tunick, KAWS, Shepard Fairey and the David Zwirner represented painter Neo Rauch

== Art ==
Becker lives and works in New York City and Vancouver Island. His oil paintings have been exhibited in numerous museums, galleries, and major art fairs in Canada, the United States and Europe, including in New York City, Los Angeles, Detroit, London, Vancouver, Toronto, Montreal, Miami and Switzerland. He had a New York solo exhibition in November, 2013. Becker had a 2024 solo exhibition opening in New York City at Not For Them. Becker also shows his work with Kelly McKenna Gallery in the New York area and Gallery Merrick in Victoria, British Columbia. Becker attended the DESTE Foundation's George Condo opening on Hydra Island in Greece in 2024, hosted by Greek art collector Dakis Joannou. Other attendees included artists Jeff Koons and Maurizio Cattelan.

Becker made international headlines after co-organizing an art show of Anna Sorokin's drawings and working on it with her while she was still in jail. The show Free Anna Delvey took place on the lower east side of Manhattan.

Becker's paintings have been written about by legendary NYC writers such as Donald Kuspit and Anthony Haden-Guest.

== Music ==
Becker's first album, Where We Are, from 2000 features guitarist Kurt Rosenwinkel.

Becker's recent 2024 quartet album Mode For Noah reached the top 10 most added on the Jazzweek 2024 US Jazz radio chart. Mode for Noah features an all-Canadian backing band of Brent Jarvis on piano, Kosma Busheikin on Bass and Graham Villette on drums and Becker on alto saxophone.

Becker as a sideman has recorded with Canadian hip-hop artist Moka Only. Rosenwinkel and Only also contributed music to the soundtrack of New York Is Now, Becker's 2010 documentary on the New York art scene. Becker performed with saxophonist David Murray at New York City's jazz club The Village Vanguard in 2018.

== Awards ==
In 2009, Becker was one of 15 artists nominated for the RBC (Royal Bank of Canada) Painting Prize. This exhibition toured Becker's painting to Musée D'Art Contemporain De Montréal and the Power Plant in Toronto.

NYArts magazine named Becker as one of their "30 Artists To Watch in 2012".

Becker was awarded second prize in the College Arts 86’ competition judged by Canadian artist Alex Colville

Becker's work is in The Michael C. Williams Collection of the Maltwood Art Museum and Gallery at the University of Victoria in Saanich, British Columbia, and was added to the permanent collection of the Art Gallery of Greater Victoria, in May, 2014.
