= Peter Haden-Guest, 4th Baron Haden-Guest =

British diplomat (1913–1996)

The Right Honourable The 4th Baron Haden-Guest

Personal details
- Born: Peter Albert Michael Haden-Guest; 29 August 1913
- Died: 8 April 1996 (aged 82)
- Spouse(s): Elisabeth Furse (m. 1939; div. 1945) Jean Pauline Hindes (m. 1945)
- Children: Anthony Haden-Guest; Christopher Haden-Guest, 5th Baron Haden-Guest; Nicholas Haden-Guest; Elissa Haden-Guest
- Parent(s): Leslie Haden-Guest, 1st Baron Haden-Guest; Muriel Goldsmid

Peter Albert Michael Haden-Guest, 4th Baron Haden-Guest (29 August 1913 – 8 April 1996), was a British United Nations diplomat and member of the House of Lords. A dancer and choreographer who performed as Peter Michael with the Markova-Dolin Ballet, Ballet Divertissement, Ballet Theatre, Ballet Joos, and the Repertory Dance Theatre from 1935 until 1945, Haden-Guest was a United Nations official from 1946 to 1972. He inherited his title in 1987.

Lord Haden-Guest was the fourth son of the 1st Baron Haden-Guest and Muriel Carmel (née Goldsmid), daughter of Albert Goldsmid (Muriel was the 1st Baron's second wife). Peter Haden-Guest's father was a convert to Judaism who had later renounced the religion. Haden-Guest's maternal grandparents were both converts to Judaism, though both were of partial Jewish ancestry. Peter Haden-Guest was an atheist.

Haden-Guest was married twice, his wives being:

- Elisabeth Wolpert (née Louise Ruth Wolpert, 1910–2002), a German-born writer and socialite better known as Elisabeth Furse; she and Peter Haden-Guest married in 1939 and divorced in 1945. They had one child, Anthony Haden-Guest (born 2 February 1937)
- Jean Pauline Hindes (1921–2017), whom he married in 1945. They had three children: Christopher (born 1948), Nicholas (born 1951), and Elissa (born 1953).

Upon his death, Lord Haden-Guest was succeeded by his son Christopher, an actor married to Jamie Lee Curtis. Lord Haden-Guest's eldest son, New York journalist Anthony Haden-Guest, was born before his parents were married and was thus ineligible for the title.

== Arms ==
Coat of arms of Peter Haden-Guest, 4th Baron Haden-Guest
Crest A caladrius displayed Sable, beaked, legged and charged on the breast with a sun in splendour Or. Escutcheon Sable two flaunches Or, three Welsh triple harps in fess counter-changed. Supporters Dexter: a leopard Sable semée of roundels and grasping in the interior paw a quill Or; Sinister: a leopard Or semée of roundels and grasping in the interior paw a quill Sable. Motto "NON NOBIS SOLUM NATI SUMUS" (Not for ourselves alone do we come into the world).

Peerage of the United Kingdom
Preceded by Richard Haden-Guest	Baron Haden-Guest; 1987–1996	Succeeded by Christopher Guest
