= Anderson Committee =

Committee formed by the British government to review signage on British motorways

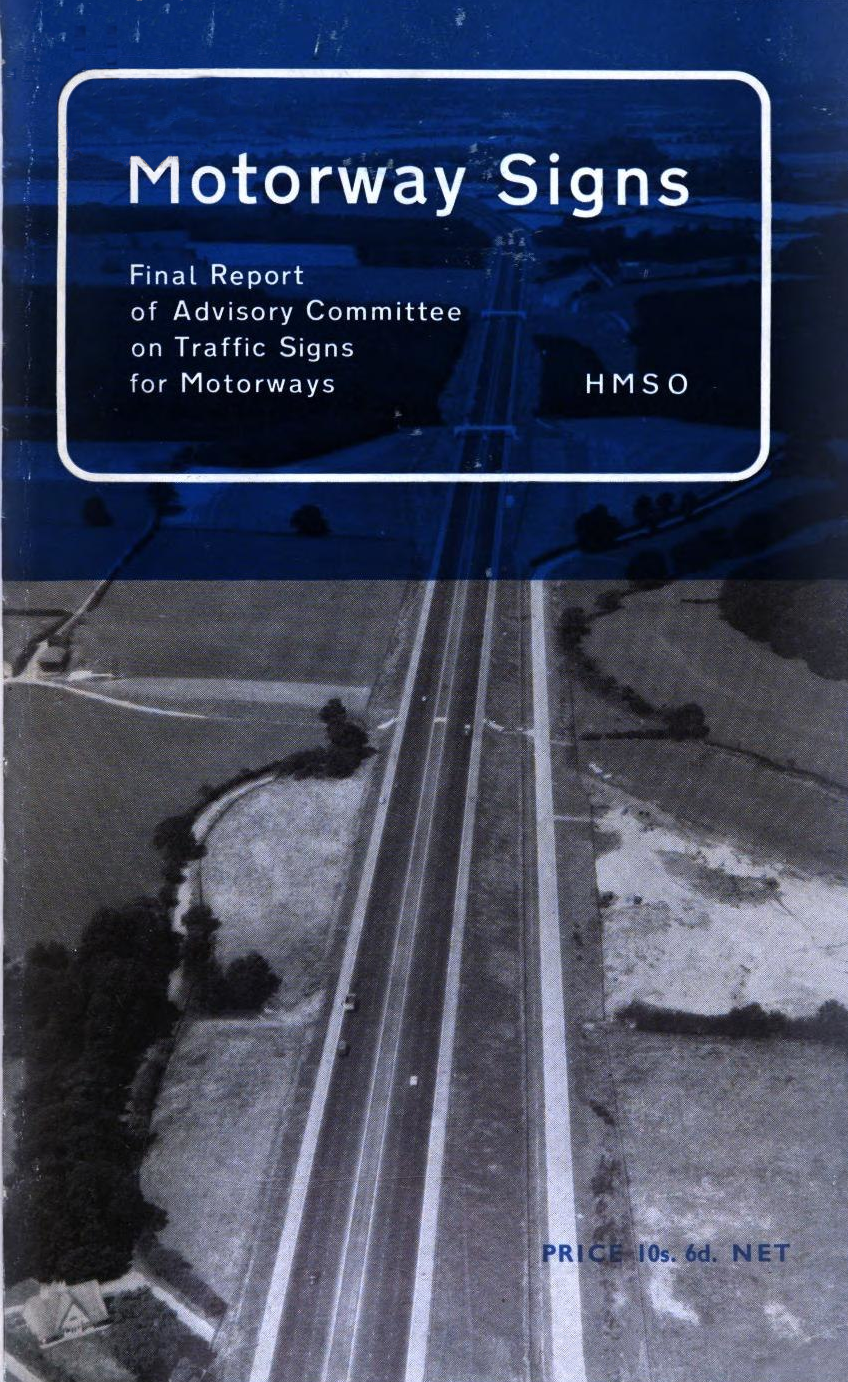
Cover of the report

The Anderson Committee, formally, "Advisory Committee on Traffic Signs for Motorways", was a 1957 government committee formed to design signs for the new motorway network under development. A system was needed that could be easily read at high speed. The Committee published its final report, Traffic Signs for Motorways, in 1962.

== Committee ==
The Committee's informal name came from its chairman, Sir Colin Anderson, chairman of the P&O.

- Sir Colin Anderson, Chairman
- Noel Carrington
- Sir Hugh Casson
- Sir William Glanville
- J. S. McNeil
- E. J. Powell
- Lord Waleran
- Assistant Secretary responsible for road traffic at Ministry of Transport (Note: D. F. Allen (Nov 1957-Oct 1958); C. H. Wykes (Oct 1958-March 1960); A. R. Hiscock (Mar-Sept 1960); T. G. Usborne (Oct 1960-1962))
- R. L. Huddy, Secretary (Until February 1959)
- A. W. Lovett, Secretary (From February 1959)

Two graphic designers were commissioned to design the system of signage: Jock Kinneir and his assistant (and later business partner) Margaret Calvert. In October 1958, the Committee presented an interim report to the Minister of Transport, Harold Watkinson. This report was not published.

== Impact ==
=== Overall recommendations ===
The Committee came to several findings the design of signage for motorways. Signage should consist of mixed case letters, only capitalizing the first letters of sentences. This deviated from the designs of prior road signs and the then regulations in effect, Traffic Signs Regulations, 1957. This decision was based on research in the United States for traffic signs used on the new Interstate Highway System, a limited-access dual carriageway network similar to motorways. While there was objections to this concept in public, the Committee concluded that

The use of blue with white text/symbols colour scheme was decided on for several reasons. A dark background with light lettering was decided upon due to its ease of reading, especially at night when illuminated. By using a distinct colour from the black and white signs being used on all-purpose roads, a driver is informed by the sign's colour that they are interacting with a motorway when approaching from a all-purpose road. While green was considered, following American design practice, the Committee settled upon blue for backgrounds as it had better contrast against greenery near motorways and blue was already in use in multiple European countries, and using it would maintain a consistency for motorists.

We find it confused and over-representational, it does not tell well at a distance and it lacks the instant impact which we believe to be essential. ... Moreover, if it is to be incorporated in various traffic signs relating to the motorway, as we originally proposed, we believe it will be impossible...

— Advisory Committee on Traffic Signs for Motorways, Traffic Signs for Motorways

Illumination of signage by bottom mounted floodlights was recommended as best practice over top mounted lighting, which resulted in irregular illumination. Reflectorizing signs was recommended as the second best option, where it was simply impracticable to use electric lighting, as reflective signage had diminished performance when using dipped headlamps, which was often necessary due to opposing traffic. There were also minor issues noted about loss of contrast and reflectorised material not appearing as a 'pure white', but these issues were deemed minor.

To identify motorways, the Committee considered an existing symbol adopted by the Economic Commission for Europe. The Committee disliked the design, finding it poor at identifying at a distance, difficult to impossible to incorporate with other signage. In its place, the Committee proposed a circular symbol, which was tested on the Preston Bypass The Committee also considered if it was possible to modify the E.C.E. symbol to make it more suitable, and came up with modified design, however were still unsatisfied with the design. It was also suggested that no symbol be adopted, relying on the colour scheme alone, which was trialed on the newly opened London-Yorkshire Motorway. (Note: Now known as the M1 Motorway) The Committee ultimately left it to the Ministry of Transport to decide on a final symbol design, which would ultimately be the modified E.C.E. symbol.

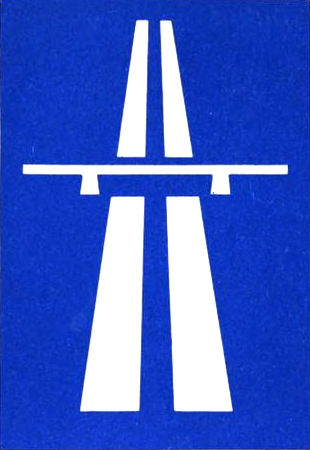
Motorway symbol adopted by the Inland Transport Committee of E.C.E.

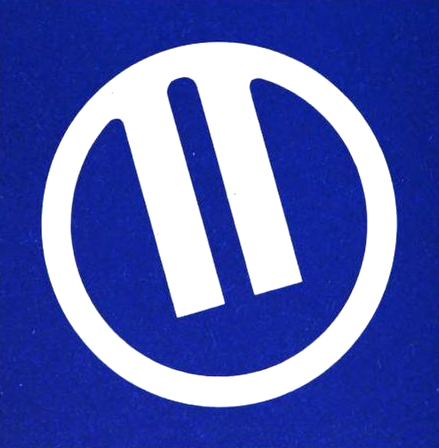
Motorway symbol now suggested for use in this country.

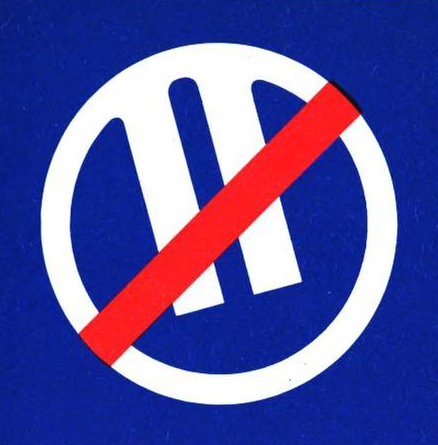
Sign now suggested for use in this country to denote the end of a motorway.

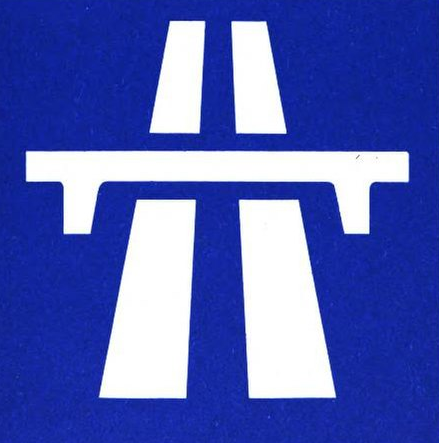
Proposed modification of motorway symbol adopted by the Inland Transport Committee of E.C.E.

The handling of place names on signs was a point of considerable concern and consideration. The Committee felt it was important to minimize the number of place names on any one sign, as names both contribute to excessive size of signs and difficulty in easily reading and understand signs at high speed. It was recommended that ideally, advanced direction signs for slip roads should have no more than three place names, and signage identifying the possible destinations that could be reached via a particular motorway not exceed four under normal circumstances. The Committee also proposed that abbreviating place names was likely necessary due to the long lengths of some locations, such as Birmingham (Birm'ham), Northampton (N'hampton) and Wellingborough (Wellingboro). While it could prove unpopular with impacted areas, it was in the best interest of design and drivers. The Committee did caution that overuse of abbreviations could reduce the effectiveness of using lowercase lettering improved readability over capital letters.

=== Adoption ===
Sign 907 - The third sign placed at the start of the deceleration lane

The recommendations of the Anderson Committee would be implemented by the Traffic Signs Regulations and General Directions 1964, which would also see the incorporation of the recommendations of Worboys Committee, tasked with reviewing traffic signs for all-purpose roads. The signs adopted largely followed the design principals laid out, however using straight lines, rather than the curved, dispensing with the red and white symbol in favor of the Worboys Committee recommendation of a red border, white background and black symbol for warning signs. The sign for cloverleafs, depicting two slip roads would not appear until 1975.

=== Legacy ===
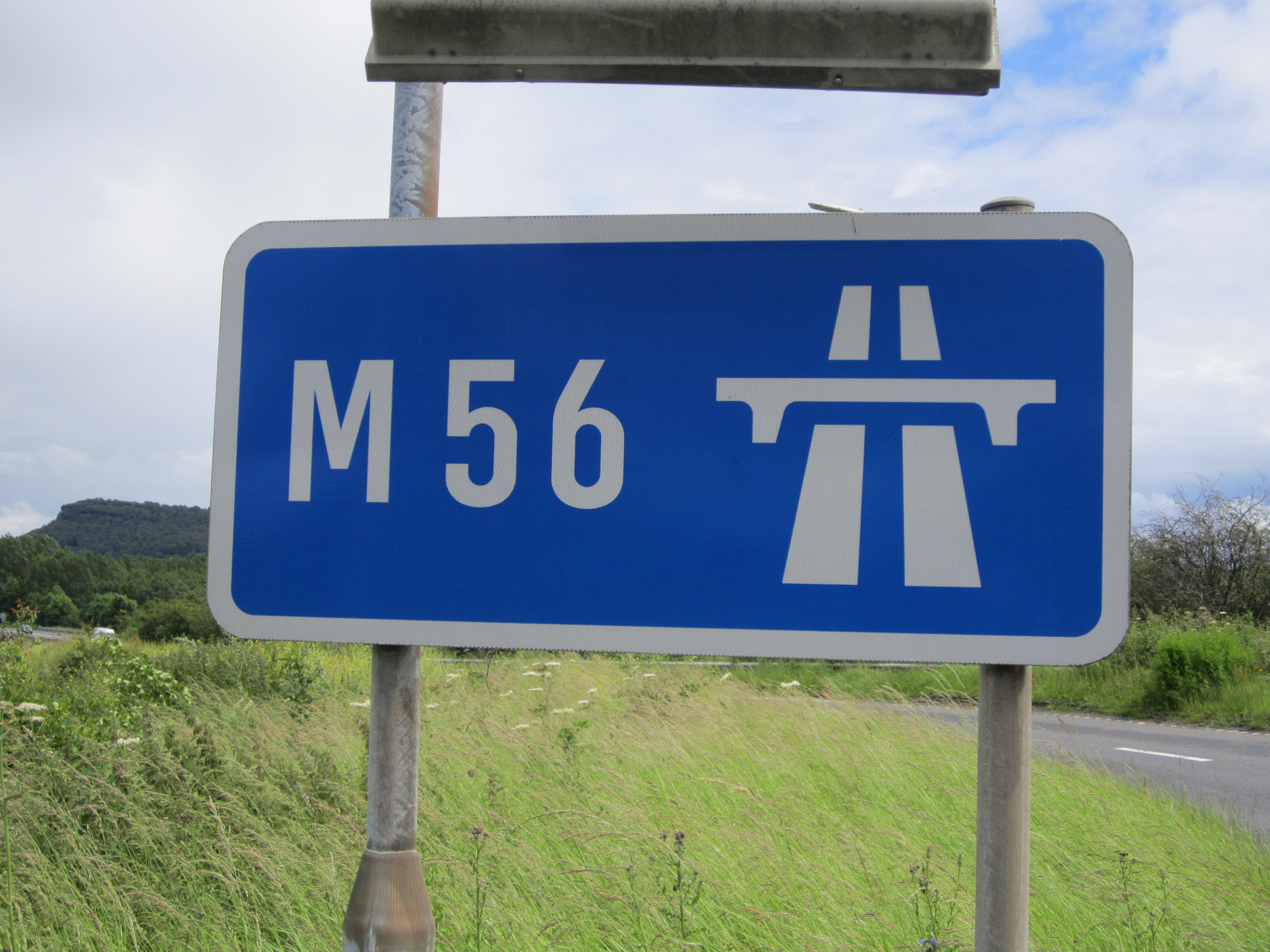
Photograph of a Sign 901.1 - 'start of motorway regulations'

The Anderson Committee's recommendations were not accepted by all. David Kindersley published an article in Traffic Engineering & Control in December 1960, disagreeing with the concept of using mixed-case lettering instead of capital letters as well as the large size of signs. Further, he wrote Later research revealed a mixed conclusion, the currently used, all capital font, MOT Serif was superior in a specific format: signs with narrow spacing between each line and the edge of the sign. However, on larger signs, where text was not close to edges or other text and there was space, no advantage was found using MOT Serif.

The signage proposed by the Anderson Committee would be further revised and updated in 1975, by the Traffic Signs Regulations and General Directions 1975. In the 1975 Regulations, Sign 901.1 indicting the 'commencement of Motorways Traffic Regulations' was updated to a simple design consisting of the Committees revised version of the E.C.E symbol and the motorway route number, eliminating the large list of traffic to be excluded from the motorway. Additionally, the revised symbol was added to directional route and place name signs. The 1975 Regulations also introduced an updated 'end of motorway regulations' sign for use at junctions: the modified E.C.E. symbol with a red diagonal bar through it.

== Recommended signs ==
These were some of the new motorway signs proposed by the Anderson Committee in 1962.

=== Motorway regulation signs ===
Due to the new nature of motorways, and the fact they were not intended for certain types of common traffic, the Committee deemed it necessary to state on the sign marking the start of the motorway, what traffic was prohibited. It was their goal that when the public becomes more familiar with motorways, that the large, wordy signs would be phased out.

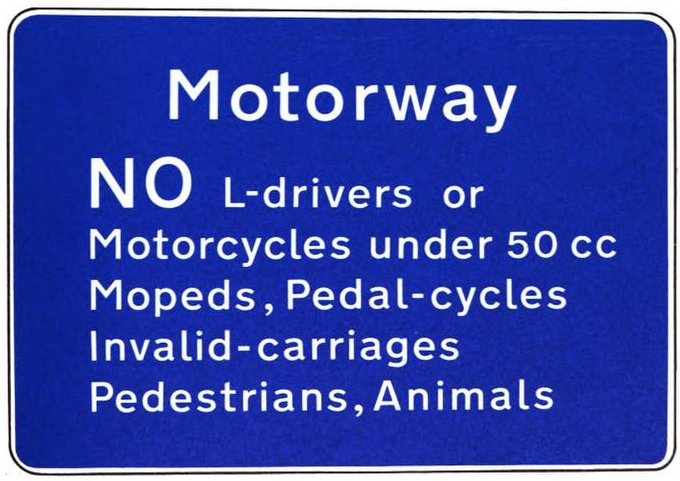
Sign now recommended to indicate traffic excluded from the motorway.

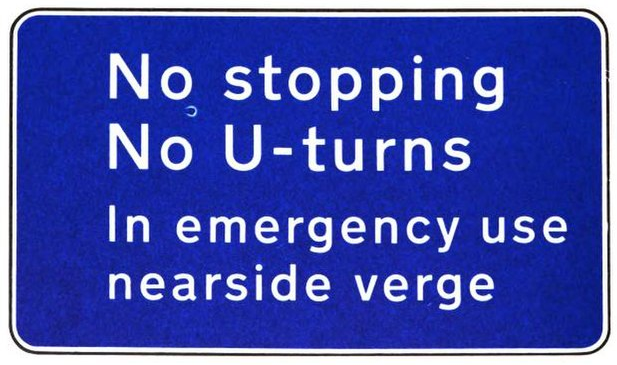
Sign to indicate rules governing use of the motorway.

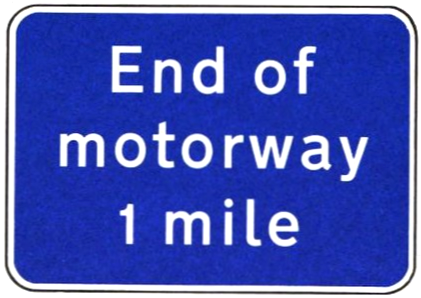
Sign to give warning of approach to end of motorway.

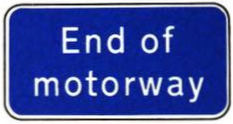
Sign to indicate that the motorway regulations no longer apply. (Note: Used in service areas.)

=== Advance Direction signs ===
The Committee also made recommendations regarding the posting of signage on all-purpose roads for directing traffic to the motorways, as well as near and at junctions interacting with slip roads onto motorways. Simple signage directing traffic to motorway was to be posted 10 miles (16 km) or further away. A specific sign was designed incorporating two roundabouts, for situations where two separate roundabouts formed a junction onto the motorway. During observation of drivers on the Preston Bypass, it was observed that drivers were reluctant to pass through the first roundabout to reach the second one, potentially unaware of the next roundabout's existence, resulting in navigational errors.

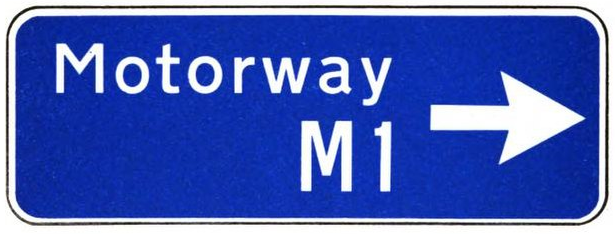
Sign to direct traffic to the motorway from distant points.

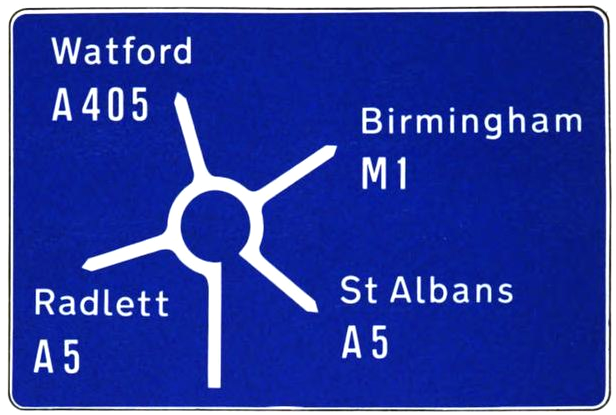
Advance direction sign on the immediate approach to a junction with the motorway.

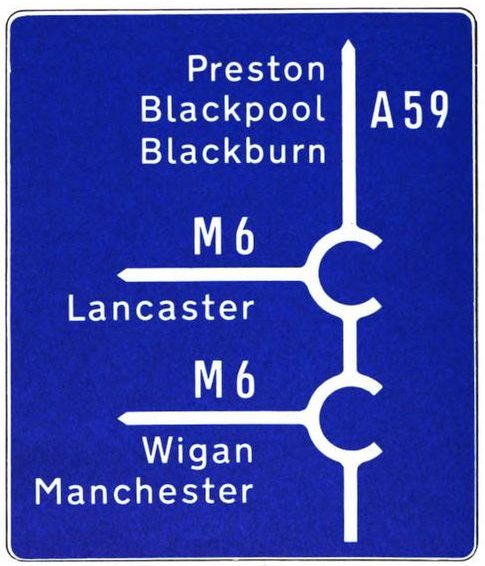
Advance direction sign on the immediate approach to a junction with the motorway which incorporates two roundabouts.

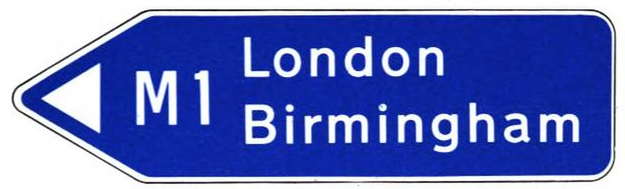
Supplementary sign at a junction with, and indicating, a motorway

=== Junction signs ===
==== Slip roads ====
To inform drivers leaving the motorway, the Committee recommended a three sign approach, first sign at 1 mile (1.6 km), the second sign at a half-mile (0.80 km), and the final sign at the start of the deceleration lane of the slip road. The provision of markers signalling the distance to the start of the deceleration, with them placed at intervals of 300, 200, and 100 yards (274, 183, and 91 m) was also recommended.

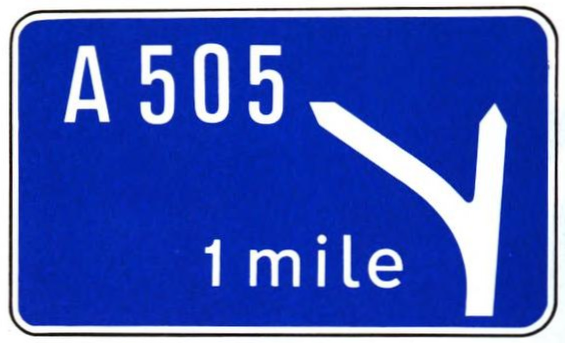
First advance direction sign for an intermediate junction.

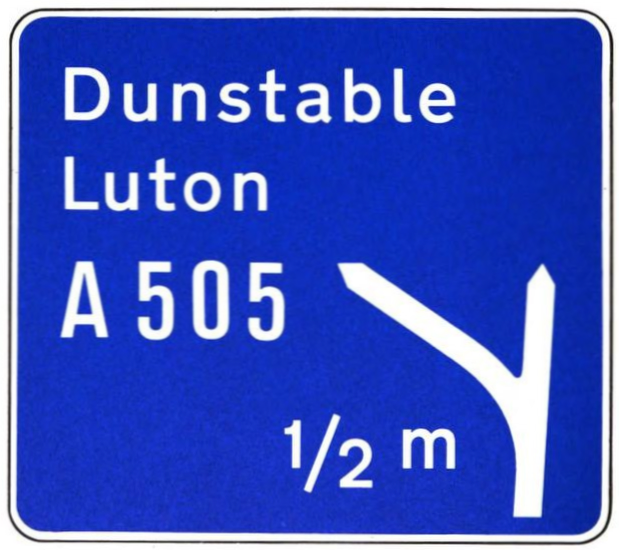
Second advance direction sign for an intermediate junction

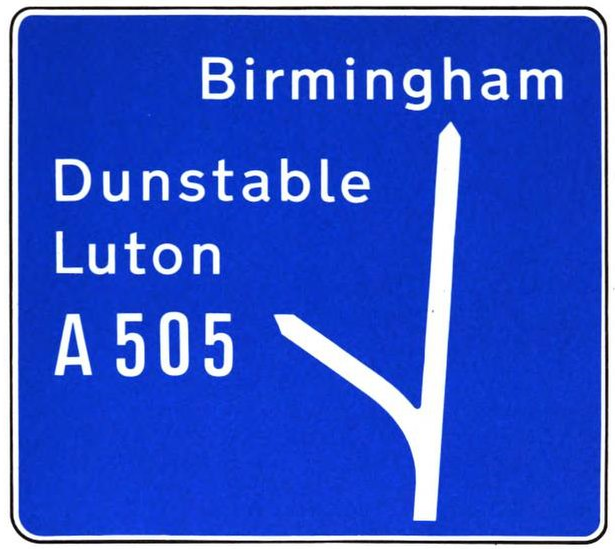
Third advance direction sign for an intermediate junction

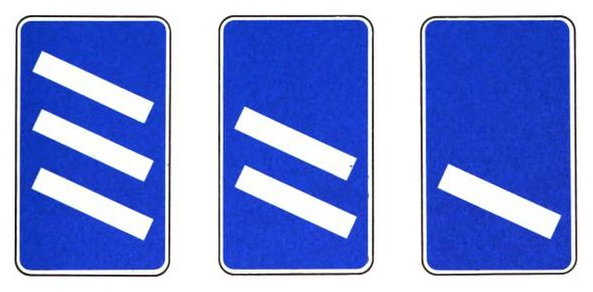
Exit distance markers, to be placed 300, 200 and 100 yards in advance of the beginning of the deceleration lane.

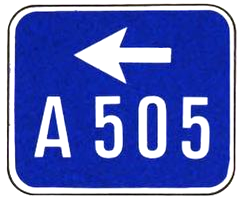
Supplementary exit sign for use where there is not room for place names

==== Junctions of two motorways ====
On approach to junctions with other motorways, guidance on placement of signs is similar to standard slip roads, but using mo In situations where motorways converge, signage was recommended to advise drivers of the merger, the rectangular blue sign at a half-mile before the merger, and the red triangular sign at the merger. In situations where a separation, a traffic island, is being used at the merger point, the 'Traffic island - Don't change lane' sign was to be used.

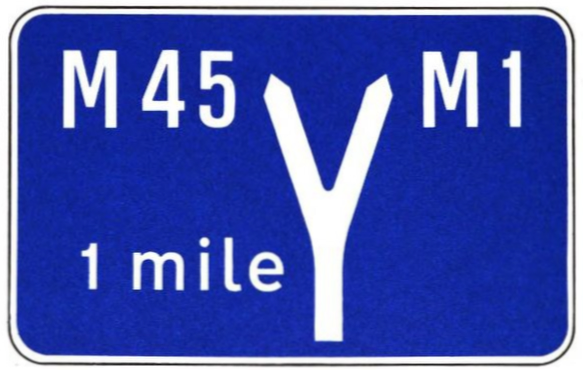
First advance direction sign for a junction of two motorways.

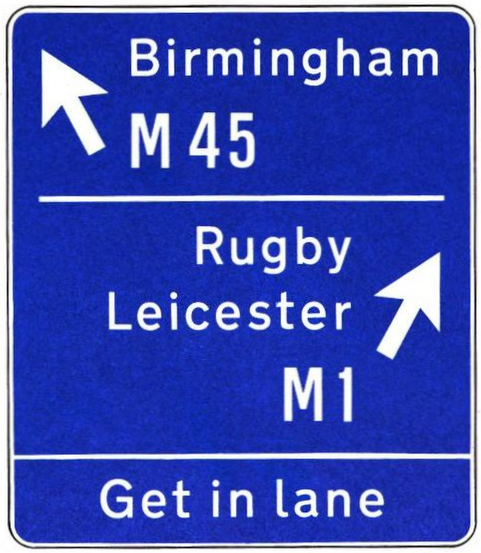
Design for second advance direction sign for a junction of two motorways.

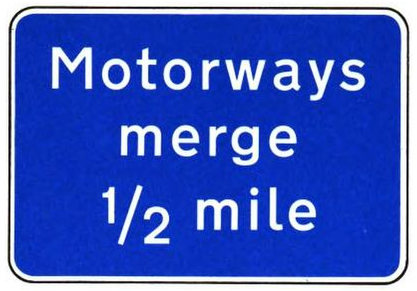
First warning sign for a convergence of two motorways.

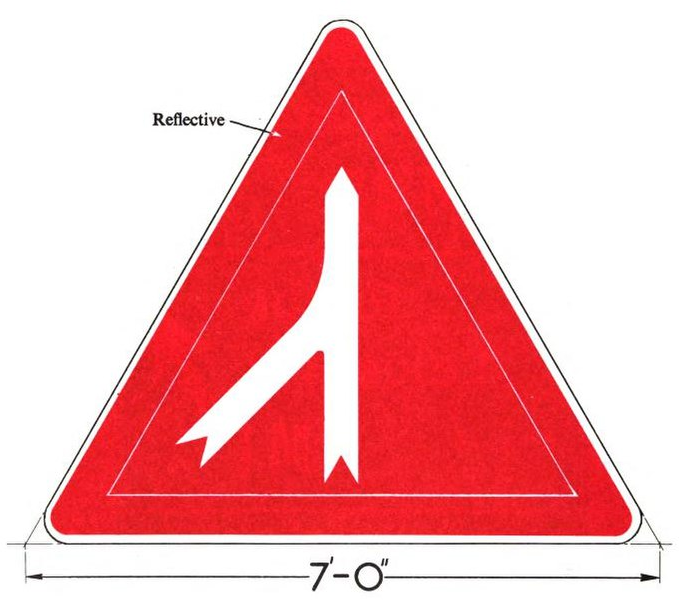
Second warning sign for a convergence of two motorways.

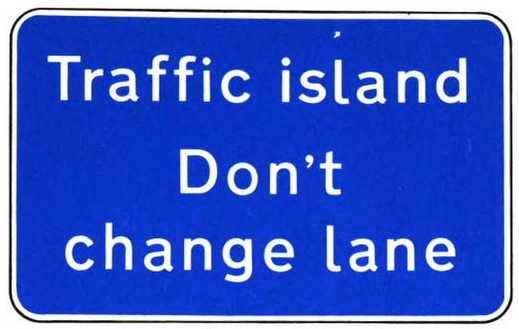
Warning of traffic island

==== Cloverleaf junctions ====
While no cloverleaf junctions existed or were in the immediate plans, the Committee was advised it was likely that such junctions would be used in the motorway network. Like other instances of slip roads leaving the motorway, the first sign at 1 mile (1.6 km) was standard 'First advance direction' sign, the second sign at a half-mile (0.80 km) depicted two junctions, and then a smaller sign at the start of the deceleration lane for each slip road, identifying the route the slip road would take the driver to. Overhead signs would be used in helping indicate to drivers the place names the various lanes would take them.

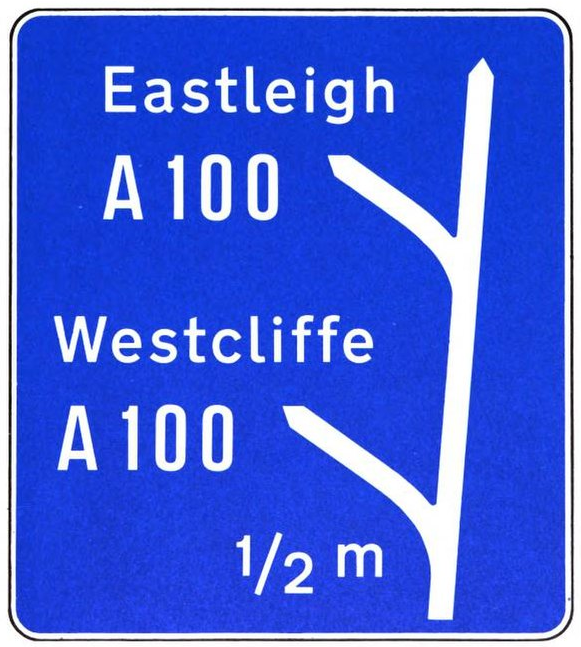
Advance direction sign for a cloverleaf junction

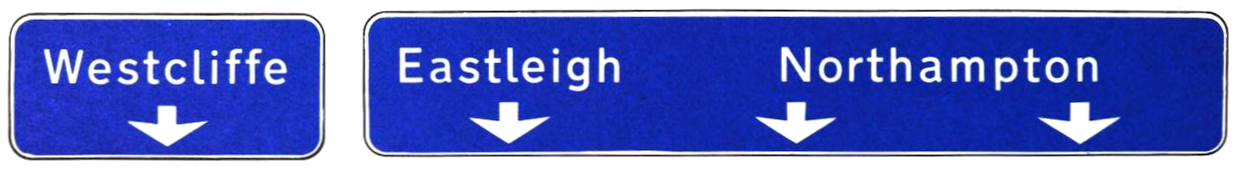
Overhead sign for cloverleaf junction

=== Signs for obstructions ===
Due to the high speed nature of the road, signage warning of unexpected obstructions from accidents or poor weather conditions is critical, to ensure drivers do not encounter these hazards at 70 miles per hour. The design of these signs deviated from the standard blue and white, instead using red and white scheme; white symbols on a non-reflective red background, with a reflective red border, which would result in a white words or symbols within a red border at night, when illuminated by headlights. The signs were designed to be portable, carried in police vehicles and deployed as needed when accidents occurred.

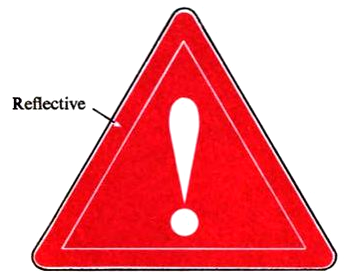
Emergency sign to be placed 1.000 yards in advance of obstruction.

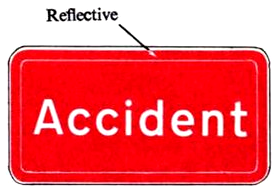
Emergency sign to be placed 900 yards in advance of an accident.

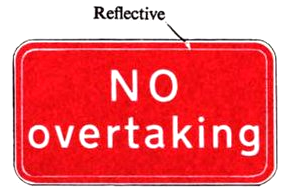
Emergency sign to be placed 600 yards in advance of an obstruction

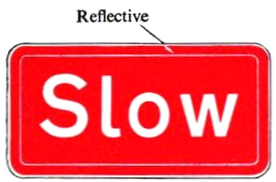
Emergency sign to be placed 300 yards in advance of an obstruction

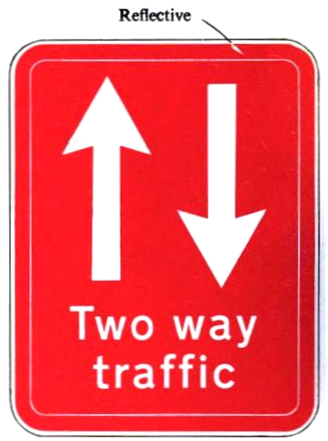
Emergency sign for use, where appropriate, at gaps in the central reservation.

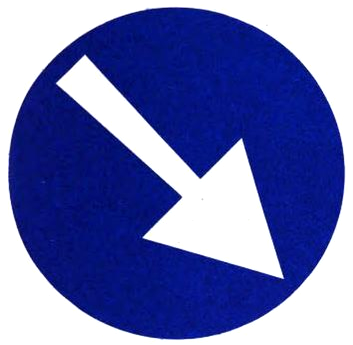
Emergency sign to indicate the route to be followed past an obstruction.

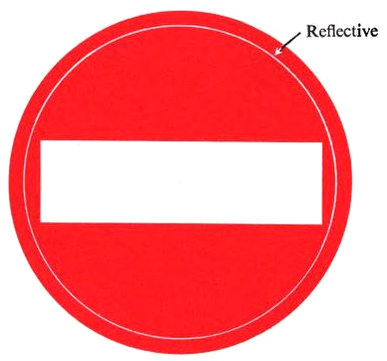
Emergency sign to indicate prohibition of entry.

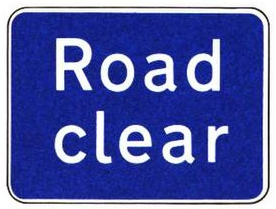
Sign to be placed after an obstruction

=== Signs for services ===
The Committee recommended that service areas be signed similar to junction slip roads, with signs at one mile and a half mile in advance of the slip road. The symbols of fuel, meals, snacks and parking were selected. Symbols indicating telephones and toilets are omitted, as every service will have these facilities, so marking them is redundant. The including of fuel and parking was a decision to emphasize the presence of these critical facilities to drivers to minimize unnecessary stopping on the motorway.

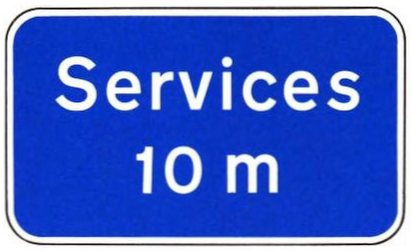
Sign to be erected, where appropriate, after each intersection along the motorway.

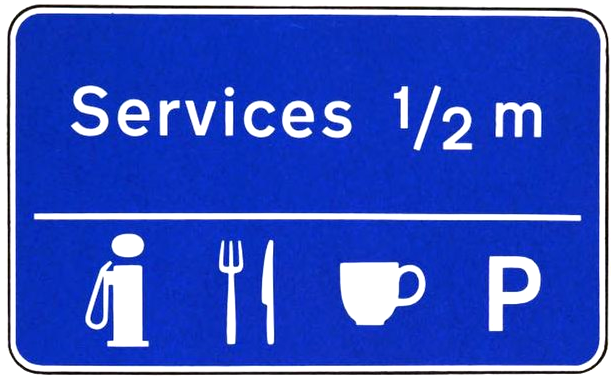
Sign to be erected half a mile in advance of a service area.

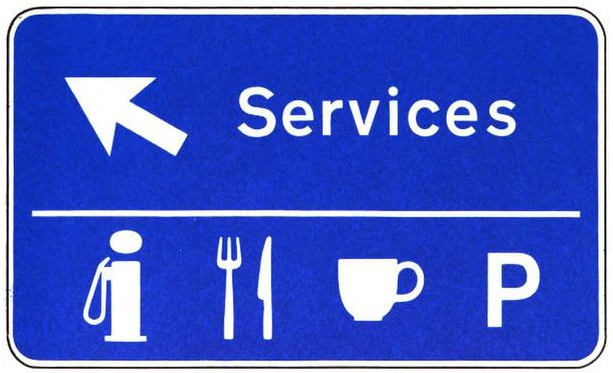
Sign to be erected at the beginning of the deceleration lane leading to a service area.

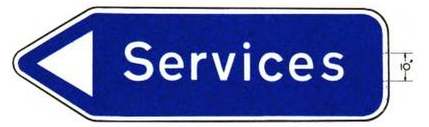
Supplementary direction sign indicating a service area.

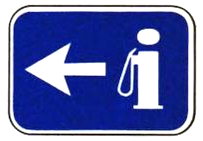
Alternative design for supplementary exit sign indicating a service area

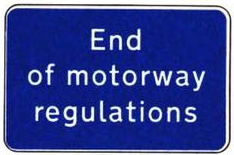
Sign at the entrance to a service area to indicate that the motorway Regulations no longer apply.

=== Miscellaneous signs ===
The Committee introduced two warning signs specific for unusual conditions that may exist during the early days of motorways, where a motorway may temporary terminate while a future section of the route is under construction. As result, drivers may encounter unusually sharp bends or reductions from the three lane configuration to two lanes, as the current route might be intended as a slip road once construction of the entire route was complete. The original northern terminus of the London-Yorkshire Motorway at what is now Junction 18, had such a lane reduction.

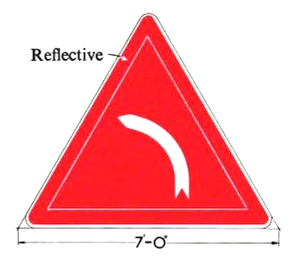
Sign to give warning of a bend

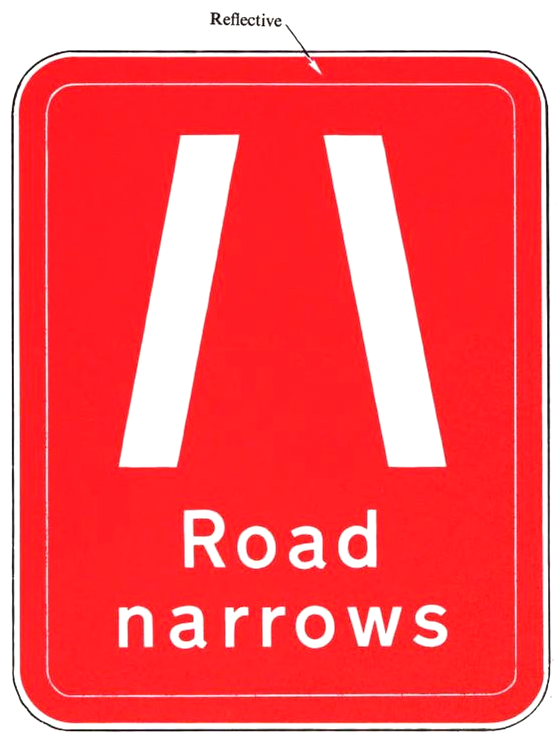
Sign to give warning that the motorway narrows

== See also ==
- Worboys Committee
- Road signs in the United Kingdom

== Bibliography ==
This article incorporates text published under the British Open Government Licence: Traffic Signs for Motorways - Final Report of Advisory Committee and Traffic signs: report of the committee on traffic signs for all-purpose roads

- "The Traffic Signs Regulations and General Directions 1957 - SI 1957/13" (PDF). legislation.gov.uk. Government of the United Kingdom. 7 January 1957.
- Anderson Committee (1962). Traffic Signs for Motorways - Final Report of Advisory Committee. London: Her Majesty's Stationery Office.
- Worboys Committee (1963). Traffic signs: report of the committee on traffic signs for all-purpose roads. London: Her Majesty's Stationery Office.
- "The Traffic Signs Regulations and General Directions 1964 - SI 1964/1857" (PDF). legislation.gov.uk. Government of the United Kingdom. 20 November 1964.
- Marshall, Chris (12 September 2021). "From War to Worboys: Anderson and Kindersley". roads.org.uk. Archived from the original on 15 August 2025.
- Kindersley, David (December 1960). "Motorway Sign Lettering". Traffic Engineering & Control. 2 (8).
- "The Traffic Signs Regulations and General Directions 1975 - SI 1975/1536" (PDF). legislation.gov.uk. Government of the United Kingdom. 18 September 1975.
