= Elisabeth Furse =

German-British Communist activist

- Born: Louise Ruth Wolpert; 30 August 1910; Königsberg, German Empire
- Died: 14 October 2002 (aged 92); London, England
- Resting place: Brompton Cemetery, London
- Spouse(s): Bertie Coker (m. 1934–?) Peter Haden-Guest (1939–1945) Patrick Furse (after 1945)
- Children: 5, including Anthony Haden-Guest

Elisabeth Furse (30 August 1910 – 14 October 2002) was a Communist activist, World War II worker in the Pat O'Leary escape line in Marseille, and a London bistro proprietor.

== Early life ==
Louise Ruth Wolpert was born on 30 August 1910 in Königsberg, East Prussia (now Kaliningrad), and brought up in Berlin. Her father, Paul Wolpert, was a Russian-speaking Latvian Jew and a wealthy textile merchant. She was nicknamed "Lisl" by an aunt, from which she derived Elisabeth, the name she later adopted for herself.

== Political activist ==
As a teenager she joined the Communist Party, and in her early twenties collected money in France and England to help political refugees in Germany to escape the Nazis.

In 1934, she married Bertie Coker, a fellow Communist. It was a marriage of convenience for a new nationality and legal residence outside Germany, where her activities with the Communists put her at risk of arrest and execution by the Gestapo. She left the Communist movement in 1934.

== Second World War ==
Her second marriage was to Peter Haden-Guest, after she had borne him a son, Anthony Haden-Guest, in 1937. The marriage was dissolved in 1945.

Elisabeth was in France when war broke out. She made her way to Marseille, where she met Pat Line leader Ian Garrow and helped those opposed to the Germans escape occupied France via the Pat O'Leary escape line. The Pat line was eventually betrayed, and after her release she returned to London. She spent the rest of the war on the Devon estate of Patrick Furse, who was to become her third husband. They had four children.

In 1953 she started The Bistro, behind London's Royal Court Theatre with her husband. Under her eccentric management, The Bistro became a regular haunt of various journalists, politicians, artists, and society figures, many of whom went on to become well-known public figures.

== Memoir ==
Furse wrote her life memoir, Dream Weaver, with the assistance of writer Ann Barr. The book was published in 1993. British journalist Christopher Long has published a long list of inaccuracies and exaggerations that appear in the book.

== Death ==
She died in 2002, aged 92, and was interred in Brompton Cemetery, London.
