= JLGB =

National Jewish youth organisation

Jewish Lads' and Girls' Brigade
- Abbreviation: JLGB
- Formation: 1895; 131 years ago
- Type: Youth organisation
- Legal status: Charity, Company Limited by Guarantee
- Headquarters: South Woodford, London, E18
- Patron: Charles III
- President: Lord Levy
- Chairman: Norman Terret
- Chief Executive: Neil Stuart Martin, CBE
- Website: www.jlgb.org
- Formerly called: Jewish Lads' Brigade (JLB)

The JLGB (Jewish Lads' and Girls' Brigade) is a national Jewish youth organisation based in and primarily serving the United Kingdom.

The UK's oldest Jewish youth movement, it was founded in 1895 as the Jewish Lads' Brigade by Colonel Albert E. W. Goldsmid, a senior army officer, to provide an interest for children of the many poor immigrant families who were coming into England at that time. The first company was launched in London's East End but others soon appeared throughout the city and the provinces. The movement later spread as far as South Africa and Canada.

Modelled on the Church Lads' and Church Girls' Brigade (and often referred to as its "Sister Organisation"), The Brigade catered for boys only in the early days, providing them with more than just spare-time activities. It offered food, clothes and the chance to learn skills which might help in finding a job, and it sought to turn young Jewish immigrant boys into good Englishmen. Just 19 boys attended the first summer camp in 1896. Girls were admitted to membership in the 1963 (as the Jewish Girls' Brigade) and in 1974 the JLB and JGB amalgamated to become the JLGB. Nowadays, several hundred youngsters camp with JLGB throughout the year. JLGB still gives young people the type of valuable training which helps them to succeed in today's world. It also offers a summer tour to Israel for its members.

King Charles III is the organisation's royal patron. He was appointed to the role in 2020, when he was Prince of Wales, to mark the brigade's 125th anniversary.

== History ==
In April 1891 The Jewish Chronicle published a letter from Rev Francis Lyon Cohen headed ´But what about the boys?´ in which he called for the creation of a Jewish youth group based on the Boys' Brigade for the well-being of working-class Jewish boys in the East End of London at the crucial period ´"Between their leaving school and their attainment of manhood". After a lecture by Colonel Albert Goldsmid before the Maccabaeans at a meeting held at the Jews' Free School in the East End of London on 16 February 1895 the first company of boys was enrolled; and six weeks later the first weekly drill was held. Recruits were drawn from JFS, the Norwood Orphanage and local elementary schools, known as Board Schools, which had been set up under the Education Act of 1870. In 1896 the first summer camp, of nineteen boys, was held at Deal, and social and athletic clubs were organised. Rev Cohen served as staff chaplain.

The idea quickly became popular, and by March 1898, there were thirteen companies in England, while a company was also established at Montreal, Quebec, Canada. Four of these, consisting of five officers and ninety boys, had been represented at the seaside camp at Deal, England, during the preceding summer. A labour bureau was then established with a view to obtaining employment for the boys; and provincial companies rapidly sprang into existence. In 1898 the summer encampment consisted of 400 boys; and a year later the number of companies in existence rose to 23, including one at Johannesburg, South Africa.

In August 1899, a second summer camp was formed in the north of England for the benefit of the members of the northern contingent, while the Deal camp was inspected by Lt.-Gen. Sir Charles Warren, who highly praised the efficiency of the lads. In 1900 a public display was given in London, which was attended by Maj.-Gen. Sir Henry Trotter, the general officer commanding the home district. The following year the number of companies had increased to thirty, while the muster-roll showed a total strength of between 3,000 and 4,000 members. Seventeen officers and members of the brigade took part in the South-African war, including Colonel Goldsmid, his place as commandant being occupied by Lieut.-Col. E. Montefiore. Of the seventeen, two died, one of them being Lieut. F. M. Raphael, who was killed at Spion Kop while attempting to rescue a wounded soldier.

In 1901 there were 540 boys at the Deal camp, and about 250 at the camp at Lytham. Goldsmid returned to the helm in 1902, followed by Montefiore later returning again in 1904. The membership by 1904 was about 3,500, and there were companies existing, in addition to those in London, at Newcastle, Bradford, Leeds, Sheffield, Hull, Birmingham, Manchester (with an adjoining youth club), Liverpool, Johannesburg, and Montreal. A somewhat similar movement in New York City has resulted in the formation of the Manhattan Rifles.

In 1912-13 Camperdown House in Half Moon Passage in the London Aldgate was built as the headquarters for the JLB.

=== Wartime ===
The JLB declined in popularity in the inter-war period as a result of public desire for peace and revulsion against 'militarism'. Membership in the JLB halved from a peak of 4,000 in 1910 to a low of 2,000 in 1925.

Most of the senior Brigade members went into Civil Defence in 1939. The ordinary boys in the Brigade units were more confident and able to cope with service in the war. They knew their drill and were able to bypass a great deal of basic training because of the training they got in the Brigade.

During World War II, approximately 60,000 Jewish men and women out of an Anglo-Jewish community estimated at 400,000 undertook military service. At least 2,010 of them died. No separate figures exist for the JLB contribution to the national effort during the war, but there is ample evidence that many ex-JLB lads saw rapid promotion through the ranks.

=== Post-war ===
On Thursday 13 August 2009 at their annual summer camp the JLGB broke the Guinness World Record for the largest custard pie fight, with 253 people taking part and throwing 648 pies in a matter of minutes.

In 2017, 80% of JLGB trustees left the organisation following a governance review the year before.

JLGB adapted their weekly groups to create JLGB Virtual as a result of the Coronavirus pandemic: they have had professionals, performers and celebrities featured in their online sessions.

== Activities ==
The JLGB runs weekly groups, Israel tours and seasonal camps. They provide a diverse range of activities within a Jewish environment, including camping, voluntary and community service, citizenship, sports, drama, social events, crafts, music, outdoor pursuits and tours. In 2014 JLGB launched their new volunteering initiative eVOLve, to create a platform for different awards and opportunities including:

- Duke of Edinburgh's Award Scheme (for which the JLGB is the only Jewish Operating Authority)
- NCS (National Citizens Service) providing a faith sensitive version of their summer programmes
- Yoni Jesner Award
- Chief Rabbi Kindness Award

== Recognition ==
By virtue of its work towards the personal and social development of young people, JLGB was a member of the National Council for Voluntary Youth Services (NCVYS).

== See also ==
- Jewish Brigade
