= Anthony Haden-Guest =

British writer and artist (born 1937)

The Honourable Anthony Haden-Guest
- Born: 2 February 1937 (age 89); Paris, France
- Education: Gordonstoun
- Occupations: Critic, journalist, cartoonist, and poet
- Notable work: Birds of Britain
- Parent(s): Peter Haden-Guest and Elisabeth Furse
- Relatives: Christopher Guest

Anthony Haden-Guest (born 2 February 1937) is an English and American writer, reporter, cartoonist, art critic, poet, and socialite who lives in New York City and London. He is a frequent contributor to major magazines and has had several books published.

== Family ==
Born in Paris, Haden-Guest is the son of Peter Haden-Guest, a United Nations diplomat who later became the 4th Baron Haden-Guest. His mother was Elisabeth Haden-Guest, née Louise Ruth Wolpert. As Haden-Guest was born before his parents' marriage, upon his father's death the peerage passed to his younger half-brother, Christopher Guest, a comedian, actor, writer, director, musician and Grammy Award-winning composer.

A blurb on the back cover of The Chronicles of Now, a book of Haden-Guest's cartoons, reads as follows:

Boring, pompous, and a complete and utter waste of time. I don't know what my brother was thinking.
—Christopher Guest.

Through Christopher Guest, Haden-Guest is brother-in-law of actress Jamie Lee Curtis. Due to the laws of peerage, the barony cannot be passed to children who are adopted, as are Christopher Guest's daughters. Therefore, the heir presumptive to the barony is actor Nicholas Guest, younger half-brother of Anthony and brother to Christopher. He also has a half-sister, Elissa Haden Guest.

== Career ==
Haden-Guest formerly penned a weekend column on art collection for the Financial Times and was the original male voice on Cristina's single "Disco Clone". His drawings have appeared in The New York Observer and he has contributed articles and stories to The Sunday Telegraph, Vanity Fair, The New Yorker, The Paris Review, Whitehot Magazine, The Sunday Times, Esquire, GQ (UK), The Observer, Radar and other major publications.

In 1979 he was awarded a New York Emmy Award for writing and narrating the PBS documentary The Affluent Immigrants. He also wrote Down the Programmed Rabbit-Hole, a collection of essays on 1970s corporate figures.

Haden-Guest frequently turns to upscale Manhattan social life for his subject matter as seen in the following sample of his work from Rolling Stone:

The lead singer had been married to one of those decadent European rich so numerous in Manhattan nowadays—"International White Trash," as the uncharitable put it—and there was a sizeable splinter group of fashionable uptown faces cruising among the downtown regulars, their expressions mingling curiosity, distaste, alarm. We fetched drinks. Making small talk would have been strenuous [...] We left. He got into a Maserati the colour of arterial blood. The three of us followed in the rich girl's Mercedes. Although almost brand-new, it was already dented and scarred by careless driving.

One reviewer said about Haden-Guest's book The Last Party: Studio 54, Disco and the Culture of the Night:

British socialite and writer Anthony Haden-Guest has been a champion party-goer for more than 30 years. There are few people more qualified to lead a reader, as he does in The Last Party, past the velvet ropes and doorman and into the tornado of 1970s disco, drug excess, and excessive sex that was Studio 54. Unlike some of his contemporaries whose memories are dulled by years of hard living, Haden-Guest seems to actually recall many of his experiences at Studio. His book is therefore part personal memoir, part reportage.

Haden-Guest was a guest on Charlie Rose while promoting his book True Colors: The Real Life of the Art World.

In 2017, Haden-Guest released a spoken-word album The Further Chronicles of Now with accompanying music written and performed by Keith Patchel.

== Personality ==
Haden-Guest is known for being humorously irreverent, as seen in the following quote on Gawker:

The massive streak of Puritanism in America has reasserted itself, especially amongst liberals. When I moved to New York there were still a bunch of good writers, often half-drunk, but still very good writers. That doesn't exist any more. Where do they go? They probably go and teach at Bard.

In response to a suggestion that Peter Fallow in the Tom Wolfe novel The Bonfire of the Vanities (1987) was based on British expatriate journalist Christopher Hitchens, Hitchens said that Haden-Guest was a more likely candidate. A website maintained by the University of Kent cites Haden-Guest as the inspiration for Fallow.

Once known for his late-night antics, Haden-Guest was named the winner of Spy magazine's "Iron Man Decathlon" in 1988 and 1989.

== Publications ==
=== Writing ===
- Bad Dreams. Macmillan, 1981. ISBN 9780025471801.
- The Last Party: Studio 54, Disco and the Culture of the Night. William Morrow & Co., 1997. ISBN 978-0-688-14151-6.
- True Colors: The Real Life of the Art World. Grove Atlantic, 1998. ISBN 978-0-8711-3725-8.

=== Cartoons ===
- The Chronicles of Now, a book of Haden-Guest's cartoons. Allworth, 2002. ISBN 9781581152203.
- In the Mean Time: The Other Ends of the World Cartoons and Dark Light Verse. Freight + Volume, 2010. ISBN 9780615423807.
- Fun Times: Further Chronicles of Now. Orange Art Foundation, 2020. ISBN 9780578600932. With essays by Adrian Dannatt, Karen Finley, and Tama Janowitz.
