= Baron Haden-Guest =

UK peerage title

Barony of Haden-Guest
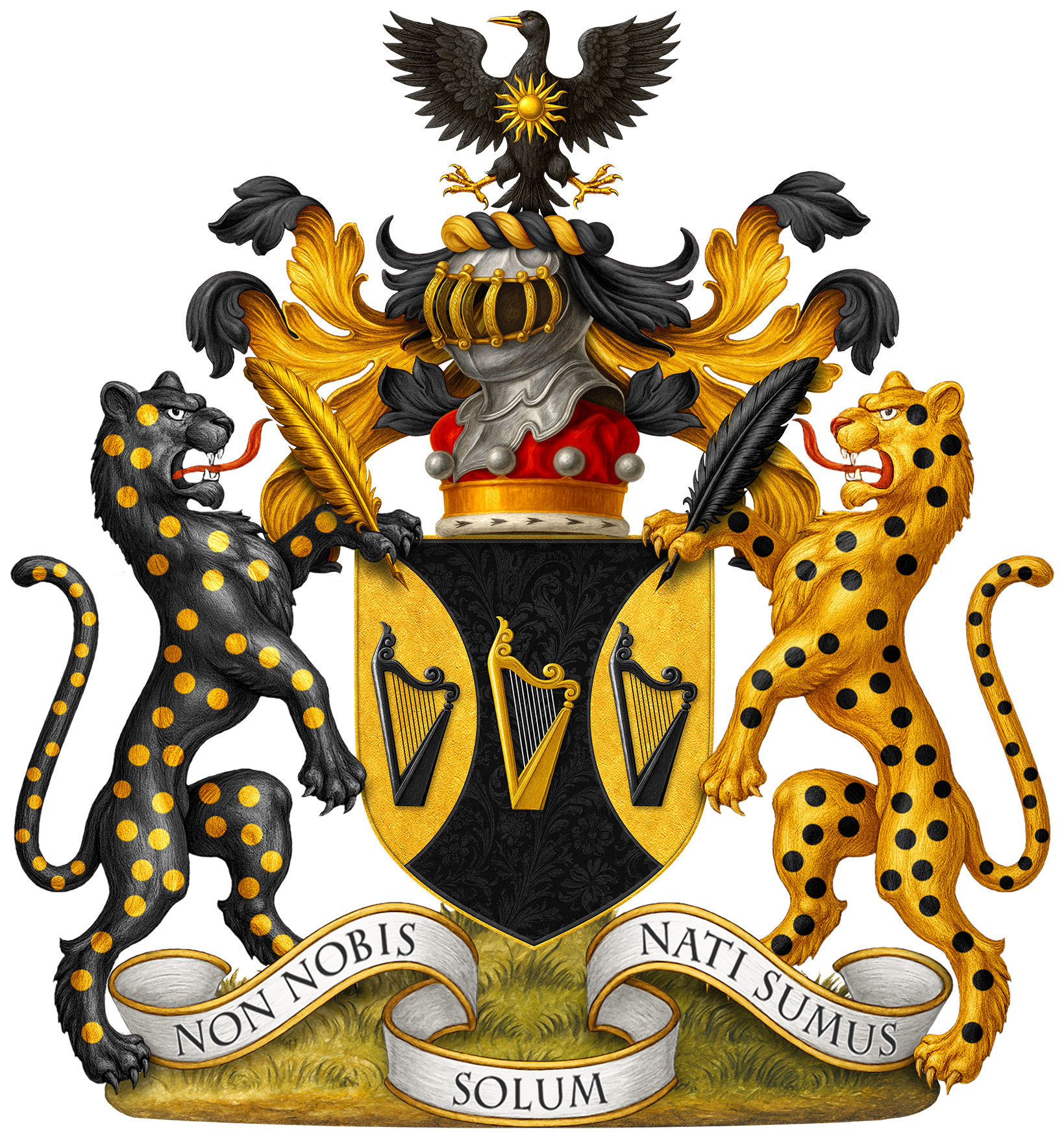
- Creation date: 2 February 1950
- Created by: George VI
- Peerage: Peerage of the United Kingdom
- First holder: Leslie Haden-Guest, 1st Baron Haden-Guest
- Present holder: Christopher Haden-Guest, 5th Baron Haden-Guest
- Heir presumptive: The Hon Nicholas Haden-Guest
- Remainder to: the 1st Baron's heirs male of the body lawfully begotten
- Status: Extant
- Motto: Non Nobis Solum Nato Sumus ("We Are Not Born Alone")

Baron Haden-Guest, of Saling in the County of Essex, is a title in the Peerage of the United Kingdom. It was created on 2 February 1950 for the Labour Party politician Leslie Haden-Guest who had previously represented Southwark North and Islington North in the House of Commons. His fourth son, the fourth Baron (who succeeded his half-brother in 1987, who in his turn had succeeded his brother in 1974), was a United Nations official for many years.

The title is held by his son, the fifth Baron, who succeeded him in 1996. Known professionally as Christopher Guest, he is a film director, writer, actor and musician. He is married to the actress Jamie Lee Curtis, who is therefore the current Lady Haden-Guest.

== Barons Haden-Guest (1950) ==
- Leslie Haden-Guest, 1st Baron Haden-Guest (1877–1960)
- Stephen Haden Haden-Guest, 2nd Baron Haden-Guest (1902–1974)
- Richard Haden Haden-Guest, 3rd Baron Haden-Guest (1904–1987)
- Peter Albert Michael Haden-Guest, 4th Baron Haden-Guest (1913–1996)
- Christopher Haden-Guest, 5th Baron Haden-Guest (born 1948)

Anthony Haden-Guest, the current baron's older half-brother, was born out of wedlock, and hence is not in the line of succession. As the current baron has no sons, the heir presumptive is his brother, Nicholas Haden-Guest (born 1951). Nicholas Haden-Guest fathers two daughters.

== Title succession chart ==
Title succession chart, Barons Haden-Guest

Leslie Haden-Guest; 1st Baron Haden-Guest; 1877–1960
Stephen Haden-Guest; 2nd Baron Haden-Guest; 1902–1974	Richard Haden-Guest; 3rd Baron Haden-Guest; 1904–1987	David Haden-Guest; 1911–1938	Peter Haden-Guest; 4th Baron Haden-Guest; 1913–1996
Brian Haden-Guest; 1935–1951	Christopher Haden-Guest; 5th Baron Haden-Guest born 1948	Hon. Nicholas Haden-Guest born 1951

== Coat of arms ==
ARMS: Sable two flaunches or, three Welsh triple harps in fess counter-changed.

CREST: A caladrius displayed sable, beaked, legged and charged on the breast with a sun in splendour or.

SUPPORTERS: Dexter, a leopard Sable semée of roundels Or and grasping in the interior paw a quill Or; Sinister, a leopard Or semée of roundels Sable and grasping in the interior paw a quill Sable.

MOTTO: Non nobis solum nati sumus (Not for ourselves alone do we come into the world).
