= Albert Goldsmid =

British Army officer (1846–1904)

Colonel Albert Goldsmid MVO
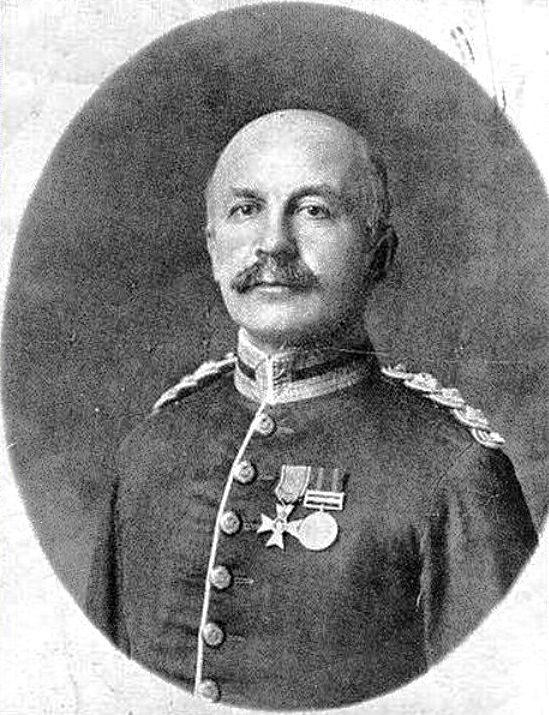
- Goldsmid in 1890-1900
- Born: 6 October 1846; Poona, British India
- Died: 27 March 1904 (aged 57); London, United Kingdom
- Resting place: Willesden Jewish Cemetery, London
- Spouse: Ida Hendricks
- Children: Gladys Montagu, Baroness Swaythling
- Military career
- Allegiance: United Kingdom
- Branch: British Army
- Unit: 104th Regiment of Foot

Colonel Albert Edward Williamson Goldsmid MVO (6 October 1846 – 27 March 1904) was a British Army officer. He was the founder of the Jewish Lads' Brigade and the Maccabaeans.

== Biography ==
Albert Goldsmid was born in Poona, India, the son of Jessie Sarah (née Goldsmit) and Henry Edward Goldsmid. Both of his parents were the great-grandchildren of Aaron Goldsmid, the founder of the Goldsmid family, and his mother was the sister of Major-General Frederic John Goldsmid. His American-born maternal grandmother, Eliza Frances Campbell, was the granddaughter of Revolutionary War aide-de-camp David Franks. His father and maternal grandfather were born Jewish, and had converted to Christianity to achieve social and economic opportunities that were denied Jews. As an adult, Goldsmid converted to Judaism and always maintained that being Jewish had not impinged upon his military career. In his later years, he identified himself as the living personification of George Eliot's Daniel Deronda. Eliot's book was transformative for Zionist development and understanding amongst Jews and non-Jews. Goldsmid's wife, Ida Stewart Hendriks, was also a convert to Judaism; she had been raised a Christian by her Protestant mother and Jewish-born father (Ida Hendriks' paternal great-great-great-grandfather had also been Aaron Goldsmid).

Goldsmid is buried at the Willesden United Synagogue Cemetery, London. He was the great-grandfather of American-born entertainer Christopher Guest, who succeeded as the 5th Baron Haden-Guest in 1996.

== Military career ==
In June 1866, having passed out from Sandhurst, Goldsmid was commissioned into the 104th Regiment of Foot. He became adjutant of battalion in 1871, captain in May, 1878, major in 1883, lieutenant-colonel in 1888, and colonel on 21 April 1894. In 1892 Colonel Goldsmid was selected by Baron de Hirsch to supervise the Jewish colonies in Argentina, but retired from the task to take up his appointment as colonel-in-command of the Welsh regimental district at Cardiff in 1894. In 1897 he was promoted chief of staff, with the grade of assistant adjutant-general in the Thames district.

At the departure of the Aldershot staff with Sir Redvers Buller in the conflict with the Boers in 1899, he acted as chief staff officer at the camp at Aldershot, and was entrusted with the duties of mobilization. In December, 1899, when the sixth division of the South-African field force was mobilized, Goldsmid was selected as chief staff officer to General Thomas Kelly-Kenny with the grade of assistant adjutant-general, and in that capacity was present at the battle of Paardeberg. During the earlier stages of the war he was commandant of the Orange River, Herbert, and Hay districts, 1900. After his service in South Africa, he was placed on half-pay in July 1901.

== Zionist activism ==
Colonel Goldsmid was an ardent Zionist, and head of the Hovevei Zion of Great Britain and Ireland. From 1896 to 1904 he was associated with Theodor Herzl as the head of the British Zionist movement and the key contact in the failed Zionist effort to establish a British Zionist protectorate in the Northern Sinai area of El Arish.
