= Christopher Guest =

American and British director and actor (born 1948)

The Right Honourable The Lord Haden-Guest
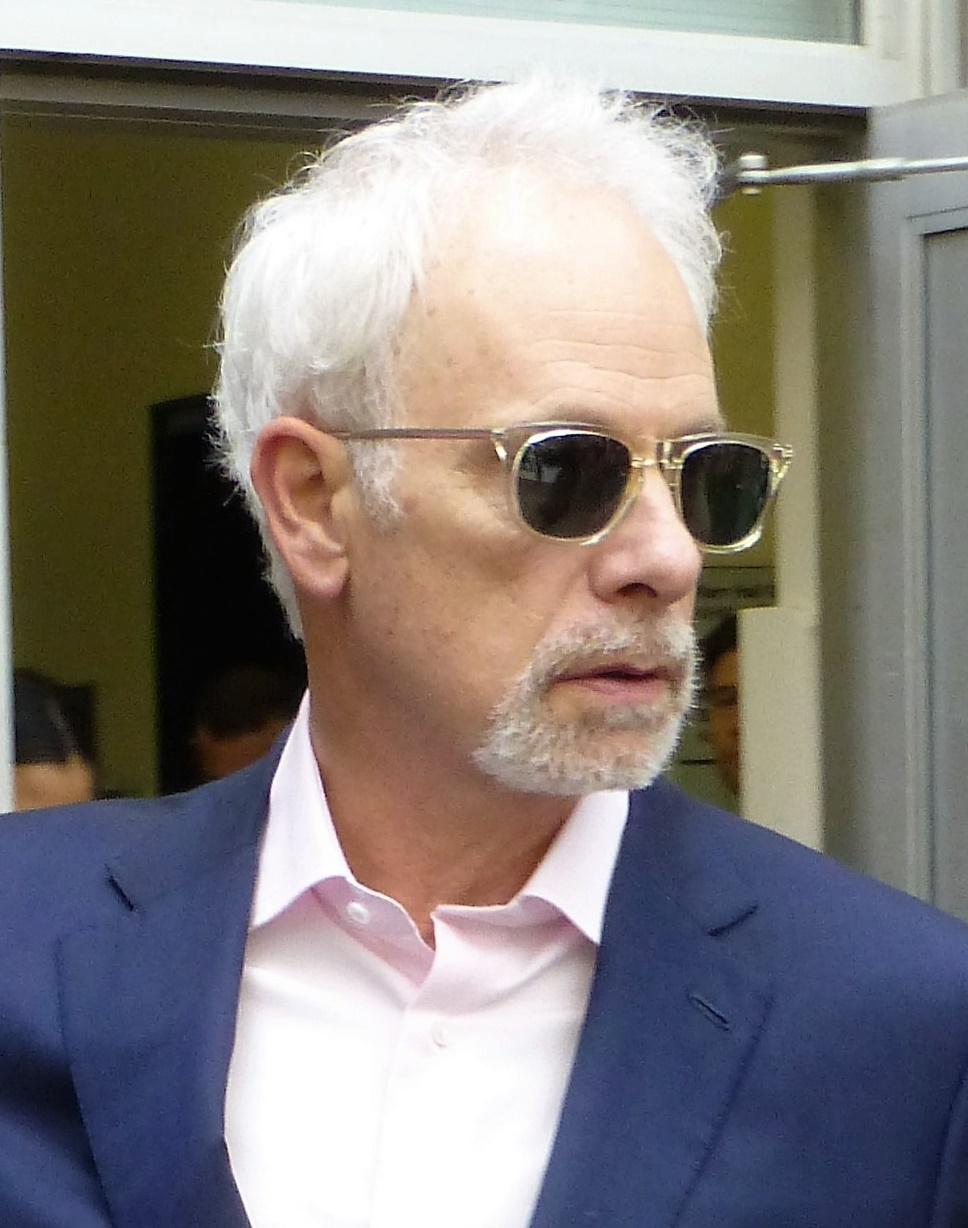
- Guest in 2016

Member of the House of Lords
- Lord Temporal
- as a hereditary peer April 8, 1996 – November 11, 1999
- Preceded by: The 4th Baron Haden-Guest
- Succeeded by: Seat abolished (Note: Under the House of Lords Act 1999.)

Personal details
- Born: Christopher Haden-Guest; February 5, 1948 (age 78) New York City, U.S.
- Spouse: Jamie Lee Curtis (m. 1984)
- Children: 2
- Parents: Peter Haden-Guest, 4th Baron Haden-Guest (father); Jean Pauline Hindes (mother)
- Relatives: Elissa Haden Guest (sister); Nicholas Guest (brother); Anthony Haden-Guest (half-brother)
- Education: New York University (MFA)

Christopher Haden-Guest, 5th Baron Haden-Guest (born February 5, 1948), known professionally as Christopher Guest, is an American-British actor, comedian, screenwriter and director. Guest has written, directed, and starred in his series of comedy films shot in mockumentary style. He co-wrote and acted in the rock satire This Is Spinal Tap (1984), and later directed a string of satirical mockumentary films such as Waiting for Guffman (1996), Best in Show (2000), A Mighty Wind (2003), For Your Consideration (2006), and Mascots (2016). He also acted in the films Death Wish (1974), Little Shop of Horrors (1986), The Princess Bride (1987), and A Few Good Men (1992); and was a regular cast member on the 10th season of Saturday Night Live.

Guest holds a hereditary British peerage as the 5th Baron Haden-Guest. He was an active member of the House of Lords from 1996 until the 1999 reforms abolished his seat. When his title is used, he should be styled as Lord Haden-Guest. Guest is married to the actress Jamie Lee Curtis.

== Early life, family and education ==
Guest was born on February 5, 1948 in New York City, the son of Peter Haden-Guest, a British United Nations diplomat who later became the 4th Baron Haden-Guest, and his second wife, the former Jean Pauline Hindes, an American former vice president of casting at CBS. Both of Guest's parents were atheists, and Guest himself had no religious upbringing.

Guest spent parts of his childhood in the UK, but he attended the High School of Music & Art in New York City. Additionally he studied classical music (clarinet) at the Stockbridge School in the village of Interlaken in Stockbridge, Massachusetts. He later took up the mandolin, became interested in country music, and played guitar with Arlo Guthrie, a fellow student at Stockbridge School. Guest later began performing with bluegrass bands until transitioning to rock and roll. Guest attended Bard College for a year and then studied acting at New York University's Graduate Acting Program at the Tisch School of the Arts, graduating in 1971.

== Career ==
=== 1970s ===
Guest began his career in theatre during the early 1970s with one of his earliest professional performances being the role of Norman in Michael Weller's Moonchildren for the play's American premiere at the Arena Stage in Washington, DC, in November 1971. Guest continued with the production when it moved to Broadway in 1972. The following year, he began making contributions to The National Lampoon Radio Hour for a variety of National Lampoon audio recordings. He both performed comic characters (Flash Bazbo—Space Explorer, Mr. Rogers, music critic Roger de Swans, and sleazy record company rep Ron Fields) and wrote, arranged, and performed numerous musical parodies (of Bob Dylan, James Taylor, and others). He was featured alongside Chevy Chase and John Belushi in the off-Broadway revue National Lampoon's Lemmings. Two of his earliest film roles were small parts as uniformed police officers in the 1972 film The Hot Rock and 1974's Death Wish.

Along with Bill Murray, Brian Doyle-Murray, and others, Guest was one of the "Prime Time Players" on Saturday Night Live with Howard Cosell. This was the short-lived variety show that aired from September 20, 1975, to January 17, 1976, not to be confused with the long-running sketch show Saturday Night Live, which began airing a month later and lampooned the group by billing their own sketch comedy actors as "The Not Ready for Prime Time Players".

Guest played a small role in the 1977 All in the Family episode "Mike and Gloria Meet", where in a flashback sequence Mike and Gloria recall their first blind date, set up by Michael's college buddy Jim (Guest), who dated Gloria's girlfriend Debbie (Priscilla Lopez).

Guest also had a small but important role in It Happened One Christmas, the 1977 gender-reversed TV remake of the Frank Capra classic It's a Wonderful Life, starring Marlo Thomas as Mary Bailey (the Jimmy Stewart role), with Cloris Leachman as Mary's guardian angel and Orson Welles as the villainous Mr. Potter. Guest played Mary's brother Harry, who returned from the Army in the final scene, speaking one of the last lines of the film: "A toast! To my big sister Mary, the richest person in town!"

=== 1980s ===
Guest's biggest role of the first two decades of his career is likely that of Nigel Tufnel in the 1984 Rob Reiner film This Is Spinal Tap. Guest made his first appearance as Tufnel on the 1978 sketch comedy program The TV Show.

Along with Martin Short, Billy Crystal, and Harry Shearer, Guest was hired as a one-year-only cast member for the 1984–1985 season on NBC's Saturday Night Live. Recurring characters on SNL played by Guest include Frankie, of Willie and Frankie (coworkers who recount in detail physically painful situations in which they have found themselves, remarking laconically "I hate when that happens"); Herb Minkman, a novelty toymaker with his brother Al (played by Crystal); Rajeev Vindaloo, an eccentric foreign man in the same vein as Andy Kaufman's Latka character from Taxi; and Señor Cosa, a Spanish ventriloquist often seen on the recurring spoof of The Joe Franklin Show. He also experimented behind the camera with pre-filmed sketches, notably directing a documentary-style short starring Shearer and Short as synchronized swimmers. In another short film from SNL, Guest and Crystal appear in blackface as retired Negro league baseball players, "The Rooster and the King".

He appeared as Count Rugen (the "six-fingered man") in The Princess Bride. He had a cameo role as the first customer, a pedestrian, in the 1986 musical remake of The Little Shop of Horrors. As a co-writer and director, Guest made the Hollywood satire The Big Picture.

Upon his father succeeding to the family peerage in 1987, he was known as "the Hon. Christopher Haden-Guest". This was his official style and name until he inherited the barony in 1996.

=== Since 1990 ===
The experience of making This is Spinal Tap directly informed the second phase of his career. Starting in 1996, Guest began writing, directing, and acting in his own series of substantially improvised films. Many of them are considered definitive examples of what came to be known as "mockumentaries"—not a term Guest appreciates.

Together, Guest, his frequent writing partner Eugene Levy, and a small band of actors have formed a loose repertory group, which appears in several films. These include Catherine O'Hara, Michael McKean, Parker Posey, Bob Balaban, Jane Lynch, John Michael Higgins, Harry Shearer, Jennifer Coolidge, Ed Begley Jr., Jim Piddock and Fred Willard. Guest and Levy write backgrounds for each of the characters and notecards for each specific scene, outlining the plot, and then leave it up to the actors to improvise the dialogue, which is supposed to result in a much more natural conversation than scripted dialogue would. Typically, everyone who appears in these movies receives the same fee and the same portion of profits. Among the films performed in this manner, which have been written and directed by Guest, include Waiting for Guffman (1996), about a community theatre group, Best in Show (2000), about the dog show circuit, A Mighty Wind (2003), about folk singers, For Your Consideration (2006), about the hype surrounding Oscar season, and Mascots (2016), about a sports team mascot competition.

Guest had a guest voice-over role in the animated comedy series SpongeBob SquarePants as SpongeBob's cousin, Stanley.

Guest again collaborated with Reiner in A Few Good Men (1992), appearing as Dr. Stone. In the 2000s, Guest appeared in the 2005 biographical musical Mrs Henderson Presents and in the 2009 comedy The Invention of Lying.

He is also a member of the musical group The Beyman Bros, which he formed with childhood friend David Nichtern and Spinal Tap's keyboardist C. J. Vanston. Their debut album Memories of Summer as a Child was released on January 20, 2009.

In 2010, the United States Census Bureau paid $2.5 million to have a television commercial directed by Guest shown during television coverage of Super Bowl XLIV.

Guest holds an honorary doctorate from and is a member of the board of trustees for Berklee College of Music in Boston.

In 2013, Guest was the co-writer and producer of the HBO series Family Tree, in collaboration with Jim Piddock, a story in the style he made famous in This is Spinal Tap, in which the main character, Tom Chadwick, inherits a box of curios from his great-aunt, spurring interest in his ancestry.

On August 11, 2015, Netflix announced that Mascots, a film directed by Guest and co-written with Jim Piddock, about the competition for the World Mascot Association championship's Gold Fluffy Award, would debut in 2016.

Guest was offered an opportunity to do another film for Netflix, but, by his own account, didn't have an idea for one and essentially decided to retire instead. He did reprise his role as Count Tyrone Rugen at a table read in the Princess Bride Reunion on September 13, 2020. After a nine-year absence from film acting, Guest came out of retirement in 2025 to reprise the role of Nigel Tufnel in Spinal Tap II: The End Continues.

== Family ==
Guest became the 5th Baron Haden-Guest, of Great Saling, in the County of Essex, when his father died in 1996. His older half-brother, Anthony Haden-Guest, was ineligible to succeed as he was born before his parents married. Guest sat in the House of Lords regularly until the House of Lords Act 1999 barred him (and most hereditary peers) from their seats. Guest remarked:

There's no question that the old system was unfair. I mean, why should you be born to this? But now it's all just sheer cronyism. The prime minister can put in whoever he wants and bus them in to vote. The Upper House should be an elected body, it's that simple.

Guest married actress Jamie Lee Curtis in 1984 at the home of their mutual friend Rob Reiner. They have two daughters, through adoption. Guest was played by Seth Green in the film A Futile and Stupid Gesture.

== Arms ==
Coat of arms of Christopher Guest
Crest A caladrius displayed Sable, beaked, legged and charged on the breast with a sun in splendour Or. Escutcheon Sable two flaunches Or, three Welsh triple harps in fess counter-changed. Supporters Dexter: a leopard Sable semée of roundels and grasping in the interior paw a quill Or; Sinister: a leopard Or semée of roundels and grasping in the interior paw a quill Sable. Motto "NON NOBIS SOLUM NATI SUMUS" ("We are not born for ourselves alone" / "Not for ourselves alone do we come into the world").

== Filmography ==
=== Film ===
Year	Title	Actor	Screenwriter	Director	Producer	Role	Notes
1971	The Hospital	Yes	No	No	No	Resident	Uncredited
1972	The Hot Rock	Yes	No	No	No	Policeman	
1973	National Lampoon Lemmings	Yes	Yes	No	No		Musical arranger
1974	Death Wish	Yes	No	No	No	Patrolman Jackson Reilly	
1975	The Fortune	Yes	No	No	No	Boy Lover	
1975	Tarzoon: Shame of the Jungle	Yes	No	No	No	Chief M'Bulu / Short / Nurse	Voice only
1978	Girlfriends	Yes	No	No	No	Eric	
1979	The Last Word	Yes	No	No	No	Roger	
1980	The Long Riders	Yes	No	No	No	Charley Ford	
1980	The Missing Link	Yes	No	No	No	No Lobes	English version; voice
1981	Heartbeeps	Yes	No	No	No	Calvin	
1981	Likely Stories, Vol. 1	Yes	Yes	Yes	No	All roles (segment "Dead Ringer")	
1983	Likely Stories, Vol. 3	Yes	Yes	No	No	Frankie (segment "Split Decision")	
1984	This Is Spinal Tap	Yes	Yes	No	No	Nigel Tufnel	Composer, musician
1985	Martin Short: Concert for the North Americas	Yes	No	No	No	Rajiv Vindaloo	
1986	Little Shop of Horrors	Yes	No	No	No	The First Customer	
1987	Beyond Therapy	Yes	No	No	No	Bob	
1987	The Princess Bride	Yes	No	No	No	Count Tyrone Rugen	
1988	Sticky Fingers	Yes	No	No	No	Sam	
1989	The Big Picture	No	Yes	Yes	No		
1992	A Few Good Men	Yes	No	No	No	Dr. Stone	
1994	The Return of Spinal Tap	Yes	No	No	No	Nigel Tufnel	
1996	Waiting for Guffman	Yes	Yes	Yes	No	Corky St. Clair	
1998	Almost Heroes	No	No	Yes	No		
1998	Small Soldiers	Yes	No	No	No	Slamfist/Scratch-It	Voices
2000	Best in Show	Yes	Yes	Yes	No	Harlan Pepper	
2003	A Mighty Wind	Yes	Yes	Yes	No	Alan Barrows	
2005	Mrs Henderson Presents	Yes	No	No	No	Lord Cromer	
2006	For Your Consideration	Yes	Yes	Yes	No	Jay Berman	
2009	Night at the Museum: Battle of the Smithsonian	Yes	No	No	No	Ivan the Terrible	
2009	The Invention of Lying	Yes	No	No	No	Nathan Goldfrappe	
2012	Her Master's Voice	No	No	No	Yes		
2016	Mascots	Yes	Yes	Yes	No	Corky St. Clair	
2025	Spinal Tap II: The End Continues	Yes	Yes	No	No	Nigel Tufnel	

=== Television ===
Year	Title	Actor	Screenwriter	Director	Producer	Role	Notes
1975	Saturday Night Live with Howard Cosell	No	Yes	No	No		Variety series
1975	The Lily Tomlin Special	No	Yes	No	No		TV special
1975	Kojak	Yes	No	No	No	Sound Man (uncredited)	Episodes: "Question of Answers Pt. 1 & Pt. 2"
1976	The Billion Dollar Bubble	Yes	No	No	No	Al Green	TV film
1976	TVTV Looks at the Oscars	No	Yes	No	No		TV special
1976	TVTV: Super Bowl	No	Yes	No	No		TV special
1976	The TVTV Show	Yes	Yes	No	No	Various	TV special
1977	It Happened One Christmas	Yes	No	No	No	Harry Bailey	TV film
1977	The Andros Targets	Yes	No	No	No	Gordon Hamilton	Episode: "A Currency for Murder"
1977	All in the Family	Yes	No	No	No	Jim	Episode: "Mike and Gloria Meet"
1978	Laverne & Shirley	Yes	No	No	No	Greg Harris	Episode: "Bus Stop"
1978	Peeping Times	No	Yes	No	No		Television special
1979	Blind Ambition	Yes	No	No	No	Jeb Stuart Magruder	Miniseries
1979	The Chevy Chase National Humor Test	Yes	Yes	No	No	Various	Television special
1980	Haywire	Yes	No	No	No	The T.V. Director	Television film
1982	Million Dollar Infield	Yes	No	No	No	Bucky Frische	Television film
1982	A Piano for Mrs. Cimino	Yes	No	No	No	Philip Ryan	Television film
1982	St. Elsewhere	Yes	No	No	No	H.J. Cummings	2 episodes
1984–85	Saturday Night Live	Yes	Yes	No	No	Various	19 episodes
1986	Shelley Duvall's Tall Tales & Legends	No	Yes	No	No		Episode: "Johnny Appleseed"
1989	Trying Times	No	No	Yes	No		Episode: "The Sad Professor"
1989	Billy Crystal: Midnight Train to Moscow	Yes	No	No	No	The Voice	Stand-up special
1989	I, Martin Short, Goes Hollywood	Yes	No	No	No	Antoninus DiMentabella	
1991	Morton & Hayes	Yes	Yes	Yes	Yes	El Supremo / Crooner / Dr. Von Astor	Directed 5 episodes; acted in 3 episodes Composed theme music
1991	Amnesty International's Big 3-0	Yes	No	No	No	Nigel Tufnel	Television special
1992	The Simpsons	Yes	No	No	No	Nigel Tufnel	Episode: "The Otto Show"; Voice
1993	Animaniacs	Yes	No	No	No	Umlatt	Episode: "King Yakko"; Voice
1993	Attack of the 50 Ft. Woman	No	No	Yes	No		Television film; also composer
1999	Dilbert	Yes	No	No	No	The Dupey	Episode: "The Dupey"; Voice
2003	MADtv	Yes	No	No	No	Alan Barrows	Episode #8.21
2007, 2021	SpongeBob SquarePants	Yes	No	No	No	Stanley S. SquarePants / Clem Clam	2 episodes: "Stanley S. SquarePants", "Goofy Scoopers"; Voice
2009	Stonehenge: 'Tis a Magic Place	Yes	No	No	No	Nigel Tufnel	3 episodes
2012	84th Academy Awards	Yes	No	Yes	No	Focus Group Member	Directed focus group segment
2013	Family Tree	Yes	Yes	Yes	Yes	Dave Chadwick / Phineas Chadwick	3 episodes; also co-creator Composed credits theme

=== Recurring cast members ===
Guest has worked multiple times with certain actors, notably with frequent writing partner Eugene Levy, who has appeared in five of his projects. Other repeat collaborators of Guest include Don Lake (8 projects); Fred Willard (7 projects); Michael McKean, Bob Balaban, and Ed Begley Jr. (6 projects each); Paul Benedict, Parker Posey, Jim Piddock, Michael Hitchcock and Harry Shearer (5 projects each); Catherine O'Hara, Larry Miller, John Michael Higgins, Jane Lynch, and Jennifer Coolidge (4 projects each); Paul Dooley, Fran Drescher, Rachael Harris and Rob Reiner (3 projects each)

Work Actor
Work Actor	This Is Spinal Tap	The Big Picture	Morton & Hayes	Attack of the 50 Ft. Woman	Waiting for Guffman	Almost Heroes	Best in Show	A Mighty Wind	For Your Consideration	Family Tree	Mascots	Spinal Tap II: The End Continues
Bob Balaban					Yes		Yes	Yes	Yes	Yes	Yes	
Ed Begley Jr.	Yes						Yes	Yes	Yes	Yes	Yes	
Paul Benedict	Yes		Yes	Yes	Yes			Yes				
Jennifer Coolidge							Yes	Yes	Yes		Yes	
Paul Dooley					Yes			Yes	Yes			
Fran Drescher	Yes	Yes										Yes
Christopher Guest	Yes		Yes		Yes		Yes	Yes	Yes	Yes	Yes	Yes
Rachael Harris							Yes	Yes	Yes			
John Michael Higgins							Yes	Yes	Yes		Yes	Yes
Michael Hitchcock					Yes		Yes	Yes	Yes		Yes	
Don Lake					Yes	Yes	Yes	Yes	Yes	Yes	Yes	Yes
Eugene Levy					Yes	Yes	Yes	Yes	Yes			
Jane Lynch							Yes	Yes	Yes		Yes	
Michael McKean	Yes	Yes	Yes		Yes		Yes	Yes	Yes	Yes		Yes
Larry Miller					Yes		Yes	Yes	Yes			
Catherine O'Hara			Yes		Yes		Yes	Yes	Yes			
Jim Piddock							Yes	Yes	Yes	Yes	Yes	
Parker Posey					Yes		Yes	Yes	Yes		Yes	
Rob Reiner	Yes		Yes		Yes		Yes	Yes	Yes			Yes
Harry Shearer	Yes				Yes	Yes		Yes	Yes		Yes	Yes
Fred Willard	Yes				Yes		Yes	Yes	Yes	Yes	Yes	

== Awards and nominations ==
Year	Award	Category	Film	Result
1976	Primetime Emmy Award	Outstanding Writing in a Comedy-Variety or Music Special; Shared with Ann Elder, Earl Pomerantz, Jim Rusk, Lily Tomlin, Rod Warren, George Yanok	The Lily Tomlin Special	Won
1995	International Fantasy Film Award	Best Film	Attack of the 50 Ft. Woman	Nominated
1998	Independent Spirit Award	Best Male Lead	Waiting for Guffman	Nominated
1998	Independent Spirit Award	Best Screenplay; Shared with Eugene Levy	Waiting for Guffman	Nominated
1998	Lone Star Film & Television Award	Best Director	Waiting for Guffman	Won
2001	DVD Exclusive Award	Best DVD Audio Commentary	This Is Spinal Tap	Won
2001	American Comedy Award	Funniest Supporting Actor in a Motion Picture	Best in Show	Nominated
2001	Golden Satellite Award	Best Performance by an Actor in a Motion Picture, Comedy or Musical	Best in Show	Nominated
2001	Independent Spirit Award	Best Director	Best in Show	Nominated
2001	Writers Guild of America Award	Best Screenplay Written Directly for the Screen; Shared with Eugene Levy	Best in Show	Nominated
2003	Seattle Film Critics Award	Best Music; Shared with John Michael Higgins, Eugene Levy, Michael McKean, Catherine O'Hara, Annette O'Toole, Harry Shearer, Jeffrey C. J. Vanston	A Mighty Wind	Won
2004	Grammy Award	Best Song Written for a Motion Picture, Television or Other Visual Media; Shared with Eugene Levy, Michael McKean	A Mighty Wind	Won

== Notes ==
Peerage of the United Kingdom
Preceded by Peter Haden-Guest	Baron Haden-Guest; 1996–present Member of the House of Lords (1996–1999)	Incumbent; Heir presumptive: Hon. Nicholas Haden-Guest
