= Islington North by-election =

Islington North by-election may refer to one of three by-elections held in the British House of Commons constituency of Islington North, in London:

- 1937 Islington North by-election
- 1958 Islington North by-election
- 1969 Islington North by-election

== See also ==
- Islington North constituency
