= 1999 Special Honours =

British government recognitions

As part of the British honours system, Special Honours are issued at the Monarch's pleasure at any given time. The Special Honours refer to the awards made within royal prerogative, operational honours and other honours awarded outside the New Years Honours and Birthday Honours

== Life Peer ==
=== Baronesses ===
- Catherine Ashton, Chair, East and North Hertfordshire Health Authority.
- Elizabeth Jean Barker, Field Officer, Age Concern and Member, Liberal Democrat Federal Policy Committee.
- May Blood, MBE, Member, Northern Ireland Women's Coalition.
- Anita Gale, General Secretary, Wales Labour Party.
- Joan Brownlow Hanham, CBE, JP, Conservative Leader of the Council, Royal Borough of Kensington and Chelsea.
- Angela Felicity Harris, DL, Deputy Chair, National Association of Police Authorities; Liberal Democrat Councillor, Richmond Town Council and North Yorkshire County Council.
- Rosalind Patricia-Anne Howells, OBE, Retired Community and Equal Opportunities Worker.
- Doreen Elizabeth Massey, Independent Consultant in Health Education, Sex Education and Sexual Health.
- Genista McIntosh, Artistic Director, National Theatre.
- Diana Warwick, Chief Executive, Committee of Vice-Chancellors and Principals of the Universities of the United Kingdom (CVCP).
- Janet Whitaker, Consultant, United Kingdom Commission for Racial Equality and Commonwealth Secretariat.
- Rosalie Catherine Wilkins, Information Officer, National Centre for Independent Living.

=== Barons ===
- Professor William Peter Bradshaw, Senior Visiting Research Fellow, Centre for Socio-Legal Studies, Wolfson College, Oxford.
- William Henry Brett, lately General Secretary, Institution of Professionals, Managers and Specialists (IPMS).
- Alexander Charles Carlile, QC, former Liberal Democrat Member of Parliament for Montgomery.
- Murray Elder, Special Adviser, Scottish Office.
- Richard Oliver Faulkner, First Deputy Chairman, Football Trust, Joint Managing Director, Westminster Communications Group Ltd.
- David Geoffrey Nigel Filkin, CBE, Policy Analyst and Writer.
- The Right Honourable Sir Michael Bruce Forsyth, Director, Robert Fleming & Co. Ltd. Former Conservative Member of Parliament for Stirling and Secretary of State for Scotland.
- Sir Norman Foster, OM, to be Baron Foster of Thames Bank, of Reddish in the County of Greater Manchester
- Robert Gavron, CBE, Chairman, Folio Society Ltd; Guardian Media Group pic; National Gallery Publications Ltd.
- Peter Henry Goldsmith, QC, Barrister and Queen's Counsel.
- Anthony Stephen Grabiner, QC, a Recorder.
- Lyndon Henry Arthur Harrison, Former Member (Labour) European Parliament, Cheshire West and Wirral.
- Tarsem King, Managing Director, Sandwell Polybags Ltd.
- Sir Graham Kirkham, Executive Chairman, DFS Furniture.
- John Laird, Chairman, John Laird Group of Communication Companies
- David Edward Lea, OBE, Assistant General Secretary, Trades Union Congress.
- David Lawrence Lipsey, Public Policy Editor, The Economist.
- Hector Uisdean Mackenzie, Associate General Secretary, UNISON.
- Christopher John Rennard, Director of Campaigns, Liberal Democrat Party.
- Colin Morven Sharman, OBE, Chairman, KPMG International.
- Peter Smith, Labour Leader, Wigan Borough Council.
- The Right Honourable William Arthur Waldegrave, Director of Corporate Finance, Dresdner Kleinwort Benson. Former Conservative Member of Parliament for Bristol West, Secretary of State for Health, Chancellor of the Duchy of Lancaster, Minister of Agriculture, Fisheries and Food and Chief Secretary to the Treasury.
- Professor John Watson, CBE, Chairman, Corporate Vision Ltd; Corporate Television Networks, Burson-Marsteller UK, Burson-Marsteller Europe.
- Kenneth John Woolmer, Chairman, Leeds University Business School, University of Leeds.

== Most Distinguished Order of St Michael and St George ==
=== Knight Grand Cross of the Order of St Michael and St George (GCMG) ===
- The Reverend Father John Ini Lapli, Governor-General of the Solomon Islands.

== Royal Victorian Order ==
=== Knight Commander (KCVO) ===
- General Sir Charles Patrick Ralph Palmer, K.B.E., Constable and Governor of Windsor Castle.

=== Commander (CVO) ===
- Philip Sinton Astley, L.V.O., on relinquishment of the post of Vice Marshal of the Diplomatic Corps.
- Captain Michael Fulford-Dobson, Royal Navy, Gentleman Usher to The Queen.

=== Lieutenant (LVO) ===
- Lieutenant Colonel Sir Christopher Guy Dyke Acland, Bt., M.V.O., on retirement as Deputy Master of the Household.

=== Member (MVO) ===
- Captain (QGO) Dharambahadur Gurung, The Royal Gurkha Rifles.
- Captain (QGO) Chitraj Limbu, The Queen’s Own Gurkha Transport Regiment.
- Lieutenant Commander Martin Richard Mitchell Tarran, Royal Navy; on completion of service as Equerry to The Duke of Edinburgh.

== Air Force Cross (AFC) ==
- A8260425 Flight Sergeant Gary Forsyth, Royal Air Force.

== Queen's Commendation for Bravery ==
- Lieutenant Robin Metcalf, Royal Navy.
- Chief Petty Officer (Diver) Clive Robert Gale, D143099G.
- Lieutenant Commander Martin Fredrick Jenrick, Royal Navy.
- Colour Sergeant Dennis Charles Lang, Royal Marines PO36530N.
- 24650262 Corporal David Atkinson, The Parachute Regiment.
- 24604353 Corporal Carl Hill Bougourd, The Princess of Wales’s Royal Regiment.

== Queen's Commendation for Valuable Service ==
- Chief Petty Officer Medical Assistant Rikki Douglas Charles Chamberlain, 112676C.
- Lieutenant Andrew Nicholas Cunningham, Royal Marines.
- Flight Lieutenant (Local Squadron Leader) Trevor Douglas Howie (8023806E), Royal Air Force Regiment.

== Mention in Despatches ==
- Squadron Leader Nicholas David Collins, (8029011A), Royal Air Force.

== Queen's Commendation for Bravery in the Air ==
- Flight Lieutenant (Acting Squadron Leader) Stephen Anthony Hayward, (8028598P), Royal Air Force.
