= Cheshire West (European Parliament constituency) =

Former European Parliament constituency

- European Parliament constituency
- Boundary within North West England (1979-1984)
- Member state: United Kingdom
- Created: 1979
- Dissolved: 1994
- MEPs: 1

Prior to its uniform adoption of proportional representation in 1999, the United Kingdom used first-past-the-post for the European elections in England, Scotland and Wales. The European Parliament constituencies used under that system were smaller than the later regional constituencies and only had one Member of the European Parliament each.

The constituency of Cheshire West was one of them.

From 1979 to 1984, it consisted of the Westminster Parliament constituencies of Bebington and Ellesmere Port, Birkenhead, City of Chester, Nantwich, Northwich, Wallasey, and Wirral. From 1984 to 1994, it consisted of Birkenhead, City of Chester, Eddisbury, Ellesmere Port and Neston, Halton, Wallasey, Wirral South, and Wirral West.

Boundary within North West England (1984-1994)

== MEPs ==
Election	Member	Party
1979	Andrew Pearce	Conservative
1989	Lyndon Harrison	Labour
1994	Constituency abolished, see Cheshire West and Wirral	

== Election results ==
European Parliament election, 1979: Cheshire West
Party	Candidate	Votes	%	±%
Conservative	Andrew Pearce	93,589	56.8	
Labour	Adrian E. Bailey	47,276	28.7	
Liberal	R. M. Green	23,816	14.5	
Majority		46,313	28.1	
Turnout		164,681	32.6	
Conservative win (new seat)				

European Parliament election, 1984: Cheshire West
Party	Candidate	Votes	%	±%
Conservative	Andrew Pearce	74,579	43.9	−12.9
Labour	David G. Hanson	64,887	38.2	+9.5
SDP	Eric C. H. Owen	30,470	17.9	+3.4
Majority		9,692	5.7	
Turnout		169,936	31.5	
Conservative hold		Swing		

European Parliament election, 1989: Cheshire West
Party	Candidate	Votes	%	±%
Labour	Lyndon Harrison	102,962	47.2	+9.0
Conservative	Andrew Pearce	79,761	36.6	−7.3
Green	Geoffrey L. Nicholls	25,933	11.9	New
SLD	John C. Rankin	9,338	4.3	−13.6
Majority		23,201	10.6	N/A
Turnout		217,994	40.1	+8.6
Labour gain from Conservative		Swing		
