= Andrew Pearce (politician) =

British politician (1937–2015)

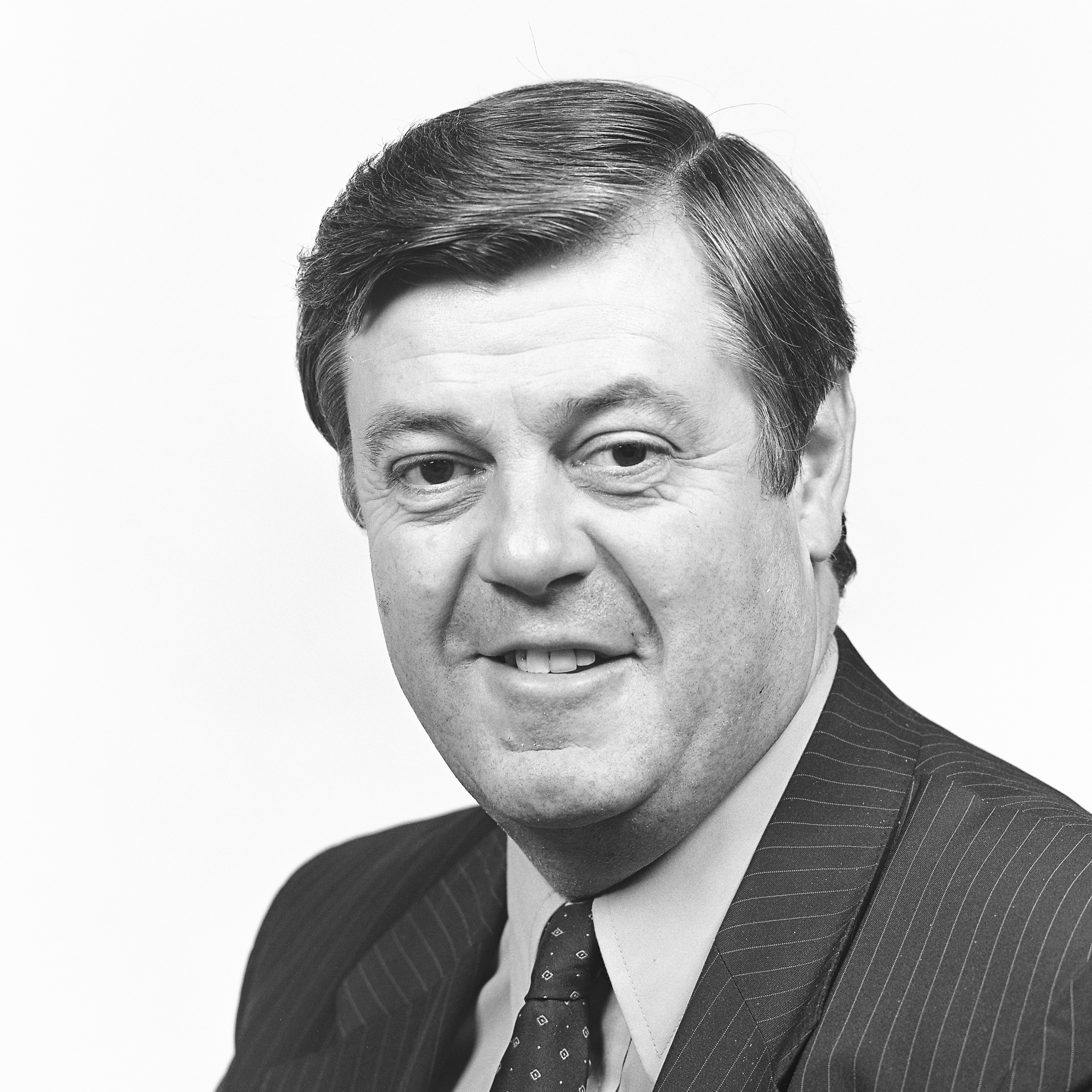

Member of the European Parliament for Cheshire West
- In office 1979–1989
- Succeeded by: Lyndon Harrison

Personal details
- Born: 1 December 1937 (age 88) Aughton, Lancashire, England
- Party: Conservative; Pro-Euro Conservative Party (1999)
- Education: King's College, Newcastle

Andrew Pearce (born 1 December 1937) is a former Conservative Party politician who served as the Member of the European Parliament (MEP) for Cheshire West from 1979 to 1989. He also ran unsuccessfully as a Conservative candidate in the 1970 general election.

Among other positions Pearce was chairman of the British Retail Consortium's International Trade Committee and chairman of the Friends of National Museums Liverpool.

== Background ==
Andrew Pearce was born to Henry Pearce and Evelyn Andrew in 1937 and grew up in Aughton. Pearce attended Rydal School in North Wales before being called for two years of national service in the Royal Air Force. In 1958 he began studying at King's College, Newcastle for a degree in economics.

== Political career ==
Pearce was personal assistant to Charles Morrison in the 1966 General Election. He was chosen to be prospective parliamentary candidate for the Conservative Party in Islington North in 1968, though lost the 1969 by-election and the 1970 general election.

Pearce was elected to the European Parliament in 1979, for Cheshire West and Wirral. In 1984 Pearce estimated that he spent 453 hours a year travelling as part of his position. In 1988 Pearce campaigned for local organisations to put in bids to the European Economic Community for free food for welfare organisations, stating that he was "puzzled and disappointed" that none in his constituency applied. In the June 1989 elections Pearce was not re-elected to the European Parliament, with Labour's Lyndon Harrison elected in his place.

He later joined the Pro-Euro Conservative Party, standing for them in the North West England region at the 1999 EU Parliament elections
