= No Love for Johnnie =

1961 British film by Ralph Thomas

- Directed by: Ralph Thomas
- Written by: Mordecai Richler; Nicholas Phipps
- Story by: novel No Love for Johnnie by Wilfred Fienburgh
- Produced by: Betty E. Box executive Earl St. John
- Starring: Peter Finch; Stanley Holloway
- Cinematography: Ernest Steward
- Edited by: Alfred Roome
- Music by: Malcolm Arnold
- Production company: Five Star
- Distributed by: The Rank Organisation
- Release dates: 9 February 1961 (World Premiere, London); 14 February 1961 (UK)
- Running time: 110 minutes
- Country: United Kingdom
- Language: English

No Love for Johnnie is a 1961 British drama film in CinemaScope directed by Ralph Thomas and starring Peter Finch. It was written by Mordecai Richler and Nicholas Phipps based on the 1959 novel No Love for Johnnie by the Labour Member of Parliament Wilfred Fienburgh.

It depicts the disillusionment and cynicism of a rebellious leftist Labour MP, who seeks escape in a relationship with a younger woman.

The film had its world premiere on 9 February 1961 at the Leicester Square Theatre in London's West End. It has been called Thomas' best film.

== Plot ==
Johnnie Byrne, a cynical and burnt-out Yorkshire Labour MP, whose career has seemingly stalled due to his ostensibly leftist leanings, is re-elected with the victorious Labour Party after a general election. Bitter not to receive an invitation to join the Government, his left-wing wife leaves him, and he accepts an invitation to lead a conspiratorial group of MPs working against the centrist government. Mary, the single woman upstairs, adores him, but they never quite become a couple.

Johnnie falls in love with a 20-year-old student/model Pauline, and misses making an important speech against the Government's militaristic plans because he is in bed with her. His conspirators turn against him and cause his local party to attempt to deselect him. He suffers a humiliating vote of no-confidence at a meeting of his Constituency Labour Party, but is put on probation. He then goes in search of Pauline, who has ended their relationship, still in love, but knowing it is not the right relationship for her.

He goes back home, where he finds his wife, who wants to give their marriage another chance; she gives Johnnie her phone number to call if he decides he wants her back. Meanwhile, the Prime Minister offers him a junior post, and reveals that the reason Johnnie was not offered one earlier was due to his wife's communist connections. Johnnie tears up the paper with his wife's phone number and embraces his role in government.

== Cast ==
- Peter Finch as Johnnie Byrne
- Stanley Holloway as Fred Andrews
- Mary Peach as Pauline
- Donald Pleasence as Roger Renfrew
- Billie Whitelaw as Mary
- Hugh Burden as Tim Maxwell
- Rosalie Crutchley as Alice
- Michael Goodliffe as Dr. West
- Mervyn Johns as Charlie Young
- Geoffrey Keen as the Prime Minister
- Paul Rogers as Sydney Johnson
- Dennis Price as Flagg
- Peter Barkworth as Henderson
- Fenella Fielding as Sheila
- Derek Francis as Frank
- Conrad Phillips as Drake
- Gladys Henson as constituent
- Peter Sallis as M.P.

== Novel ==
The film was based on a novel by Labour politician Wilfred Fienburgh whose wife later said he wrote it over three months to "make some money". Fienburgh died in a car crash in February 1958 and the novel was published in early 1959. In February 1959 the BBC bought the rights to adapt the book for television. The book was serialised in a newspaper and became a best seller in England for several months. It was picked up for publication in the US.

== Development ==
Film rights were bought by Sydney Box who hired Mordecai Richler to do the script and David Deutsch to produce. Richler said the original hope was for Jack Clayton to direct. However two weeks into Richler working on a script, Box had a heart attack and retired, and Deutsch moved on to another project. No Love for Johnnie transferred to Betty Box and Ralph Thomas. They were dissastifed with Richler's script and had Nicholas Phiipps work on it.

Box and Thomas had made the Doctor comedies for the Rank Organisation, and used this as leverage to get the studio to finance other projects, such as No Love for Johnnie. Ralph Thomas later said "we made that because we wanted to make it very much. We all loved it – Betty, myself, Peter Finch."

Betty Box said she was "very surprised Rank let me do it... because they were very politically conservative as an organisation. Perhaps they liked the Peter Finch character being so corrupt because, after all, he was left-wing. I must say I liked it very much... I enjoyed making it very much. I loved working with Peter Finch. He was drunk some of the time, and not always very easy, but I was just very fond of him. Ralph and I both knew how to work with him."

In August 1960 St John announced Rank would make fifteen films that year, down from his peak of 55 a year. "About a third will be comedies," he said. "The remainder will be dramas - some of them more frankly adult than we have ever attempted before. We must move with the times." No Love for Johnnie was expected to be Rank's first X rated movie.

== Shooting ==
Filming started in August 1960. Ralph Thomas said "Peter managed to get everything that existed in that man [Fienburgh] on to the screen without ever having known him. People who knew Fienburgh really well identified Peter absolutely with the character."

Music was by Malcolm Arnold, the score containing themes similar to those from Whistle Down the Wind (1961), which he also scored the same year. Arnold produced music scores for more than a hundred films, among these The Bridge on the River Kwai (1957), for which he won an Oscar.

There is a brief appearance of a young Oliver Reed as a bohemian party-goer.

Filmink said "Rank’s films under St John were famously timid in their story angles, especially compared to rivals such as Woodfall, Bryanston, Hammer and Romulus" but argued "the odd gutsy movie did sneak through", giving No Love for Johnnie as an example.

== Reception ==
Thomas says the Labour Party were "enormously supportive" of the film even though it "knocked the Labour Party terribly" and "half the cabinet came to premiere."

=== Box Office ===
In March 1961 Kinematograph Weekly wrote the film "had a first-class opening week. The melodrama... is an amalgam of sex and politics, but, although politics are usually anathema to the ladies, the film's appealing equally to men and women. The picture bears an X certificate, but the X, far from being a handicap, is almost an infallible sign of success." However it was not a commercial success. Thomas says the film "got great notices although it was never a commercial success, didn't even pay for itself... it very much reflected the politics of the day. The plain fact is that people were not very interested in the politics of the day."

=== Critical ===
Reviews were very strong, particularly for Finch.

The Monthly Film Bulletin wrote: "The story splits awkwardly in two. Its emphasis, and most of the feeling, are on the side of Johnnie's affair with Pauline, a middle-aged man's efforts to rediscover himself through his love for a twenty-year-old girl. ... Stanley Holloway's fatherly M.P., with his talk of "the people in the streets", and Donald Pleasence's thin lipped intriguer are undeveloped and consequently improbable characters, though hardly more so than Dennis Price's chic photographer or Fenella Fielding's wild party-giver. With its range of contemporary allusions, No Love for Johnnie no doubt considers that it is making a move towards realism; but the lack of real conviction or spirit behind its "frank" love scenes, its strip-tease club visit and the rest of it, produce an effect which at first looks self-conscious and ends up looking vulgar."

Variety said the film "though not sensational in treatment, it has some earthy sex angles and is a strong, adult film which should hold intelligent audiences. Though it has no obvious stellar value for the U.S., No Love For Johnnie is a film worth the attention of any out-of-the-rut booker."

Filmink argued "it's extremely well made with superb work from Peter Finch but is also (surprisingly) dramatically underwhelming. The movie didn’t recover its cost at the box office; Ralph Thomas blamed politics, but we think the main reason is the lead has no drive, no passion – he’s bad at his job, slacks off, doesn't care about anything, just sort of flounders around. If Finch’s character had ambition and drive like the leads of Room at the Top and Saturday Night and Sunday Morning, this film would’ve had more kick. Nonetheless, No Love for Johnnie remains a high point in the career of Finch, Box and Thomas."

Bosley Crowther of The New York Times praised the films authentic depiction of British political life, highlighting Ralph Thomas' direction and the films vivid sense of place, from constituency backrooms to the House of Commons. He also praised it for Peter Finch's performance calling it "sharp and compelling" and called the supporting cast strong. Crowther also criticised the film for its structural inconsistency, saying that the shift from political drama to romantic melodrama weakened the narrative, the romance subplot being implausible and overly dominant, causing the film to lose focus and he also felt that the final act of the film felt contrived.

== Accolades ==
Finch won two film awards for this performance – one a BAFTA (his third), and the other the Silver Bear for Best Actor at the 11th Berlin International Film Festival. The film won Best Film from the British Film Academy.
