= Robert Young (Islington North MP) =

Reginald Stanley Young (28 May 1891 – 20 March 1985), known as Robert Young, was a Labour Party politician in the United Kingdom.

Born in Manchester, Young was educated at Manchester Grammar School, before becoming a theatre producer and critic. He also wrote Cricket on the Green. During World War I, he served in the Australian and New Zealand Army Corps in France.

Young joined the Labour Party, and at the 1929 general election, he was elected as Member of Parliament (MP) for Islington North, the first Labour MP for that constituency. He lost his seat at the 1931 general election to the Conservative candidate Albert Goodman. He stood again at the 1935 election, but Goodman retained the seat.

Parliament of the United Kingdom
Preceded by Henry Cowan	Member of Parliament for Islington North; 1929–1931	Succeeded by Albert Goodman
