= Albert Goodman =

United Kingdom Conservative politician

Albert William Goodman (1880 – 22 August 1937) was a Conservative politician in the United Kingdom.

At the 1929 general election, he unsuccessfully contested the safe Labour seat of Bow and Bromley in east London, losing to the incumbent George Lansbury by a wide margin.

As Labour's vote collapsed at the 1931 general election, he won the Islington North seat from the constituency's Labour member of parliament (MP) Robert Young, who had gained it from the Conservatives in 1929.

Goodman held his seat at the 1935 general election, and died in 1937, aged 57 (the first of three 20th-century MPs from that constituency to die in office). At the following by-election, the Labour candidate, Leslie Haden Guest, won the seat for his party.

== Bibliography ==
- UK General Elections since 1832
- Craig, F. W. S. (1983) [1969]. British parliamentary election results 1918–1949 (3rd ed.). Chichester: Parliamentary Research Services. ISBN 0-900178-06-X.
- Leigh Rayment's Historical List of MPs

Parliament of the United Kingdom
Preceded by Robert Young	Member of Parliament for Islington North; 1931–1937	Succeeded by Leslie Haden Guest
