= No Love for Johnnie (novel) =

1959 political novel by Wilfred Fienburgh

- First edition cover
- Author: Wilfred Fienburgh
- Publisher: Hutchinson Heinemann
- Publication date: 1959

No Love for Johnnie is a political novel by British politician Wilfred Fienburgh, first published in 1959 by Hutchinson Heinemann. The novel tells the story of Johnny Byrne, a cynical and burnt-out politician whose career has stalled due to his leftist leanings in a conservative Labour government. The novel was adapted into a film in 1961, directed by Ralph Thomas. Through Byrne's story, the novel explores the complexities of power and ideology, the true cost of ambition and the corrupting influence of power. Stylistically, the novel belongs to the genre associated with John Osborne, John Braine, Shelagh Delaney and other realist writers who were to find their voices in the new wave of British verismo art forms.
