= Gerry Reynolds (British politician) =

British Labour politician (1927–1969)

Gerry Reynolds MP

Member of Parliament for Islington North
- In office 15 May 1958 – 7 June 1969
- Preceded by: Wilfred Fienburgh
- Succeeded by: Michael O'Halloran

Personal details
- Born: Gerald William Reynolds; 17 July 1927 Brentford, Middlesex, England
- Died: 7 June 1969 (aged 41) London, England
- Party: Labour
- Spouse: Dorothy Budd (m. 1949)
- Children: 2

Gerald William Reynolds (17 July 1927 – 7 June 1969) was a British Labour Party politician who was the Member of Parliament for Islington North from 1958 until his death.

== Background ==
Reynolds was born Brentford, Middlesex, in 1927, and was educated in Acton. He was diagnosed with kidney disease when he was fourteen, and at the time was given only three months to live. He went on to attend the Ealing School of Art.

== Political career ==
Reynolds began his political career on the Acton Borough Council, to which he was elected in 1949. He served as mayor of Acton from 1961 to 1962. He was elected as the Member of Parliament for the constituency of Islington North in a 1958 by-election following the early death of the sitting MP Wilfred Fienburgh, who was killed in a car crash at the age of 38. He was re-elected the following year at the 1959 general election, and at the next two general elections in the constituency.

In the British Government of the 1960s he was Parliamentary Under-Secretary for the Army from 1964 to 1965, then for two years he was the Minister of Defence (Army). From 1967 to 1969 he held the office of Minister of Defence (Administration) at the Ministry of Defence.

== Personal life and death ==
Reynolds married Dorothy Budd in 1949, and they had two daughters.

Reynolds died from cancer at a London hospital on 7 June 1969, at the age of 41. Few in parliament knew he was ill, and so his death came as a considerable shock; he had previously been considered a "rising star" in Westminster, and was being talked of as a potential future prime minister.

== Publications ==
The Night the Police Went on Strike, by Reynolds, G.W. & Judge, A. (Pub. Weidenfeld & Nicolson, London, 1968).

Parliament of the United Kingdom
| Preceded by Wilfred Fienburgh | Member of Parliament for Islington North; 1958–1969 | Succeeded by Michael O'Halloran |
