= 1969 Islington North by-election =

UK parliamentary by-election

The 1969 Islington North by-election was a parliamentary by-election held on 30 October 1969 for the UK House of Commons constituency of Islington North in Islington, north London.

The seat had become vacant when the constituency's Labour Member of Parliament (MP), Gerry Reynolds died on 7 June 1969, aged 42. He had held the seat since a by-election in 1958 following the death of his predecessor, Wilfred Fienburgh.

Although traditionally a safe Labour seat, the Conservatives had gained control of Islington in the 1968 Islington Council election.

The result of the contest was a victory for the Labour Party candidate, Michael O'Halloran, who won with a majority of 1,534 votes over the Conservative candidate Andrew Pearce.

Islington North by-election, 1969
Party	Candidate	Votes	%	±%
Labour	Michael O'Halloran	7,288	49.2	−10.2
Conservative	Andrew Pearce	5,754	38.9	+8.2
Liberal	Eric G. Thwaites	1,514	10.2	+0.4
Independent Socialist	Austin Williams	245	1.7	New
Majority		1,534	10.3	−18.5
Turnout		14,801	32.8	−21.4
Registered electors		45,077		
Labour hold		Swing	−9.2	

== See also ==
- Islington North (UK Parliament constituency)
- Islington
- 1937 Islington North by-election
- 1958 Islington North by-election
- Lists of United Kingdom by-elections
