= 1937 Islington North by-election =

UK parliamentary by-election

- 13 October 1937

Constituency of Islington North
- Turnout: 40.4% (▼19.3%)
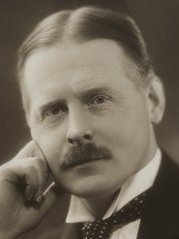
	First party	Second party
		Con
Candidate	Leslie Haden-Guest	Wilfrid Sugden
Party	Labour	Conservative
Popular vote	13,523	12,227
Percentage	52.5%	47.5%
Swing	▲6.9%	▼6.9%
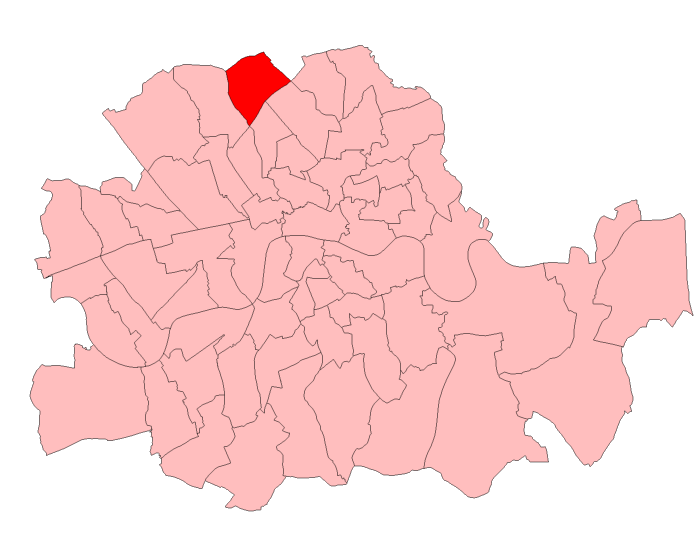
- A map of parliamentary constituencies within the County of London at the time of the by-election, with Islington North highlighted in red.
MP before election
Albert Goodman
Conservative
Subsequent MP
Leslie Haden-Guest
Labour

The 1937 Islington North by-election was a parliamentary by-election held on 13 October 1937 for the British House of Commons constituency of Islington North in Islington, North London.

The seat had become vacant when the constituency's Conservative Member of Parliament (MP), Albert Goodman, died on 22 August 1937, aged 57. He had held the seat since the 1931 general election.

The result of the contest was a victory for the Labour candidate, Leslie Haden-Guest, who won with a majority of 1,296 over the Conservative candidate, former MP Sir Wilfrid Sugden. Haden Guest represented the constituency until he stepped down at the 1950 general election.

The constituency was then held by Labour almost continuously from 1937 until 2024, save for a brief period in the 1980s when incumbent Labour MP Michael O'Halloran joined the breakaway Social Democratic Party. Labour's victory streak ended in 2024 when Independent Jeremy Corbyn won the seat, having been deselected as the Labour Party candidate.

Islington North by-election, 1937
Party	Candidate	Votes	%	±%
Labour	Leslie Haden-Guest	13,523	52.5	+6.9
Conservative	Wilfrid Sugden	12,227	47.5	−6.9
Majority		1,296	5.0	N/A
Turnout		25,750	40.4	−19.3
Registered electors		63,747		
Labour gain from Conservative		Swing	+6.9	

== See also ==
- Islington North (UK Parliament constituency)
- Islington
- 1958 Islington North by-election
- 1969 Islington North by-election
- List of United Kingdom by-elections
