= Wilfred Fienburgh =

British politician (1919–1958)

Wilfred Fienburgh MBE
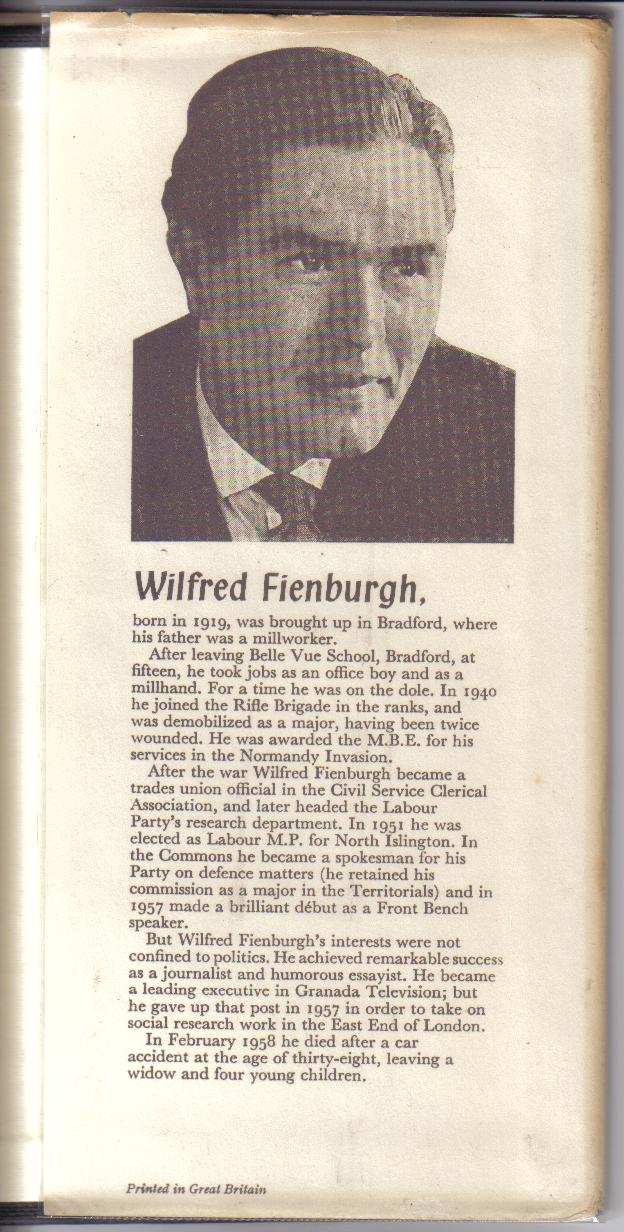

Member of Parliament for Islington North
- In office 25 October 1951 – 3 February 1958
- Preceded by: Moelwyn Hughes
- Succeeded by: Gerry Reynolds

Personal details
- Born: Wilfred Fienburgh; 4 November 1919 Ilford, England
- Died: 3 February 1958 (aged 38) London, England
- Party: Labour
- Spouse: Joan McDowell (m. 1940)
- Children: 4

Wilfred Fienburgh MBE (4 November 1919 – 3 February 1958) was a British Labour Party politician.

== Early life ==
Though born in Ilford, he was brought up in the Belle Vue area of Bradford, Yorkshire, where he attended primary and secondary school. Between 1935 and 1939 he was a manual labourer and an office boy, but was also unemployed for a while.

== Military service ==
In 1940, early in the Second World War, he enlisted in the British Army in the Rifle Brigade and was commissioned as an officer the same year. He took part in the Normandy landings in 1944 and was twice wounded. He was made a Member of the Order of the British Empire (MBE) in 1945 and was demobilised as Major, serving on the General Staff, in 1946. He continued to serve with the Territorial Army, and was a Major with the Intelligence Corps before his death.

== Political career ==
At the general election in 1945 he stood unsuccessfully at the Pembrokeshire constituency in Wales, losing by only 168 votes to the Liberal Party candidate Gwilym Lloyd George.

After demobilisation he became full-time Assistant Secretary of the Civil Service Clerical Association, a trade union. In 1947 he joined the Labour Party Research Department. For four years he was the secretary of the party's policy committee, drafting various articles of party policy.

At the general election in 1951 Fienburgh was elected as Member of Parliament (MP) for Islington North in North London, although at the time of his death he was living in Hemel Hempstead. Percy Lucas, a friend and fellow MP, mentioned in his memoir Five Up that Fienburgh also had a burgeoning media career with both Granada Television and the Sunday Express.

Commentators have expressed varying views of Fienburgh. Anthony Howard described him (in The Times 7 November 2000) as "rather louche", and Denis Healey asserted in his autobiography The Time of My Life (1989) that Fienburgh's "good looks and big brown eyes often led him astray". Edward Pearce, writing in The Guardian, described him as a "delightful and amusing Labour politician". Peter Hitchens in his book The Abolition of Britain described him as "one of the most talented men on the party's Left". Fienburgh was allegedly involved in an altercation with Jennie Lee during the Labour Party conference in 1952, according to Lee's biographer Patricia Hollis.

Wilfred Fienburgh represented Islington North until his death in a car crash in 1958, aged 38. At the resulting by-election the seat was retained for Labour by Gerry Reynolds with an increased majority.

== Writer ==
Fienburgh wrote several books, including non-fiction works such as Steel is Power – The Case for Nationalisation and 25 Momentous Years: A 25th Anniversary in the History of the Daily Herald. However, his best remembered book is a posthumously published novel, No Love For Johnnie, a cynical portrayal of British politics in the late 1950s that was later adapted as a film starring Peter Finch. The novel seems to give vent to Fienburgh's deep-seated concerns about corruption in politics. According to Michael Rush, in The Selection of Parliamentary Candidates (1969), Fienburgh claimed in 1955 that "the Labour Party is the only party in Britain in which you can buy a seat". One near-contemporary critic, Alan Lovell, writing in the New Left Review in 1961, considered No Love For Johnnie a "bad novel" and wrote that "Fienburgh seems to have had no conception of what idealism means". Derek Jewell, writing in 1967, called it "a bitter study of political life". Geoffrey Wheatcroft in The Observer in 2001 suggested that No Love for Johnnie was the archetype of a genre that he named "the Labour Party novel of disillusionment". In the New Statesman in 2000 Paul Routledge idescribed the novel as being highly prescient about New Labour.

== Personal life ==
In 1940 Fienburgh married Joan Valerie Hudson McDowell, daughter of Captain Thomas McDowell of Belfast. The couple had two sons and two daughters.

Fienburgh died aged 38 when the car he was driving collided with a lamppost at Mill Hill, London on 3 February 1958. His funeral took place on 7 February at Golders Green Crematorium. He left £6,177 in his will (worth £139,951.35 in 2018), according to The Times report of 8 May 1958.

According to The Library Association Record (1961, p. 205) Fienburgh's widow Joan was invited to open a new Islington public library in July 1960 as an official mark of respect for her late husband. MP Bob Mellish collected a sum of £400 from fellow MPs to give to Joan Fienburgh. Joan remarried in 1975, and died in 1991.

Parliament of the United Kingdom
Preceded by Moelwyn Hughes	Member of Parliament for Islington North; 1951 – 1958	Succeeded by Gerry Reynolds
Party political offices
Preceded by Michael Young	Secretary of the Research Department of the Labour Party; 1947–1952	Succeeded by David Ginsburg
