= Michael O'Halloran (British politician) =

British politician

Member of Parliament for Islington North
- In office 30 October 1969 – 13 May 1983
- Preceded by: Gerry Reynolds
- Succeeded by: Jeremy Corbyn

Personal details
- Born: Michael Joseph O'Halloran; 20 August 1933 County Clare, Ireland
- Died: 29 November 1999 (aged 66) County Wexford, Ireland
- Party: Labour (Before 1981); SDP (1981–1983); Independent Labour (1983–1999)

Michael Joseph O'Halloran (20 August 1933 – 29 November 1999) was an Irish-born British politician. He was brought up in County Clare, Ireland, and being out of work, he "drifted to London" in 1948, aged fifteen, and worked as a railwayman until he entered politics.

He stood as a Labour candidate, and was elected as the Member of Parliament for Islington North at a by-election in 1969 following the death of sitting MP Gerry Reynolds. He had previously been the secretary of the Islington North Constituency Labour Party. His selection over Keith Kyle was the subject of an investigation in the early 1970s by The Sunday Times newspaper. They highlighted his background with a local building company and the local Irish community and questioned the propriety of the tactics of his supporters during his selection as candidate. He was a staunch Catholic in his political beliefs, although he made relatively few contributions to parliamentary debates. He frequently drew on his experience as a railwayman when discussing transport policy.

In 1976, Keith Veness, a local party member, was expelled for saying that O'Halloran was dominated by Irish Catholic influences, but later reinstated by the party's NEC.

He was a strong opponent of the legalisation of abortion. His office was invaded by activists in 1977, and he claims that he was punched to the ground and kicked, and was only revived when the police arrived. During the same year, when the Labour Government's parliamentary majority was under threat, he threatened to resign unless the left wing in his constituency party was brought under control.

Following pressure from the left in his local party, O'Halloran was among the Labour MPs who defected to the newly founded Social Democratic Party (SDP) in 1981. However, in 1983, the SDP chose John Grant, the MP for Islington Central (which was being abolished in boundary changes), to be their official candidate in Islington North. O'Halloran left the SDP to stand as an Independent Labour candidate at the 1983 general election. The official Labour Party candidate and future leader, Jeremy Corbyn won the seat; whilst O'Halloran came in fourth place with 11% of the vote. Grant finished in third place with 22% of the vote.

O'Halloran retired to County Wexford with his wife, and lived there until his death aged 66.

Parliament of the United Kingdom
Preceded by Gerry Reynolds	Member of Parliament for Islington North; 1969–1983	Succeeded by Jeremy Corbyn
