= Islington North =

Parliamentary constituency in the United Kingdom, 1885 onwards

Coordinates: 51.561°N 0.114°W

- Borough constituency for the House of Commons
- Interactive map of boundaries from 2010
- Location within Greater London
- County: Greater London
- Electorate: 73,970 (March 2020)

Current constituency
- Created: 1885
- Member of Parliament: Jeremy Corbyn (Your Party)
- Seats: One
- Created from: Finsbury

Islington North is a constituency (Note: A borough constituency (for the purposes of election expenses and type of returning officer)) in Greater London established for the 1885 general election. It has been represented in the House of Commons of the Parliament of the United Kingdom by one member of Parliament (MP) since it was created, with Jeremy Corbyn serving as its MP since 1983. Corbyn, who served as Leader of the Labour Party and Leader of the Opposition from 2015 until 2020, was an independent between 2020 and 2026. After having only ever stood as a candidate of the Labour Party, he was returned as an independent MP for Islington North at the 2024 general election, before formally registering as a Your Party MP in the House of Commons in June 2026.

== Constituency profile ==
Islington North is an urban constituency in the Borough of Islington in Greater London, located around 3 miles (4.8 km) north of the centre of London. It includes the neighbourhoods of Archway, Finsbury Park, Highbury, Tufnell Park and parts of Holloway. The constituency is densely-populated and developed around the Great North Road (now the A1). The road has existed since mediaeval times but the area was mostly developed during the 19th century. Arsenal Football Club is located in the constituency. Islington North has average levels of wealth; there is some deprivation in Finsbury Park whilst Highbury is more affluent. House prices are higher than the rest of London and more than double the national average.

In general, residents of the constituency are very young and well-educated, and a high proportion work in professional occupations. They are unlikely to be married and have low rates of homeownership. White people made up 62% of the population at the 2021 census, a higher percentage than London as a whole. Around one-third of the White population are of non-British origin, including large Irish and Italian communities. Black people were the largest ethnic minority group at 15% and Asians made up 9% of residents. Most of the constituency is represented by the Labour Party at the local borough council, although Green Party councillors were elected in Highbury. Voters in the constituency overwhelmingly supported remaining in the European Union in the 2016 referendum; an estimated 78% voted to remain compared to the nationwide figure of 48%, making Islington North one of the top fifteen most Remain-supporting constituencies out of 650 across the country.

== Boundaries ==
=== 1885–1918 ===
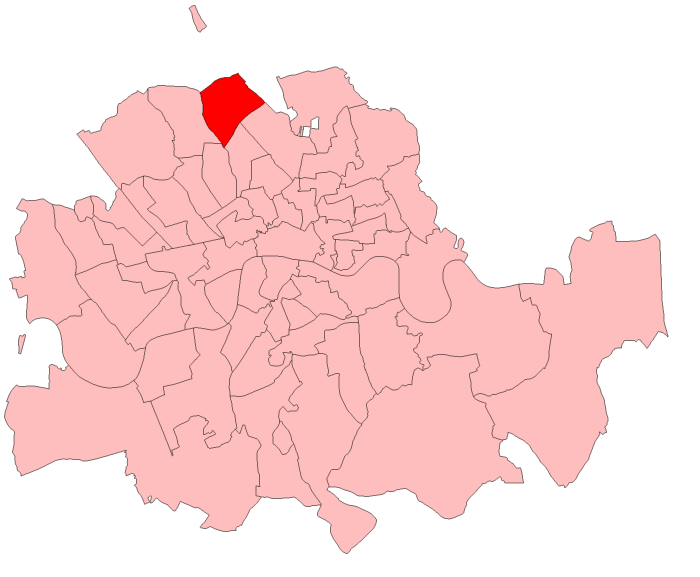
Islington North in London 1885–1918

The seat was created by the Redistribution of Seats Act 1885, as one of four divisions of the new parliamentary borough of Islington. The constituency was defined in the legislation as consisting of the single ward of Upper Holloway of the parish of Islington. The ward was one of eight used in the election of Islington vestrymen under the Metropolis Management Act 1855.

=== 1918–1950 ===
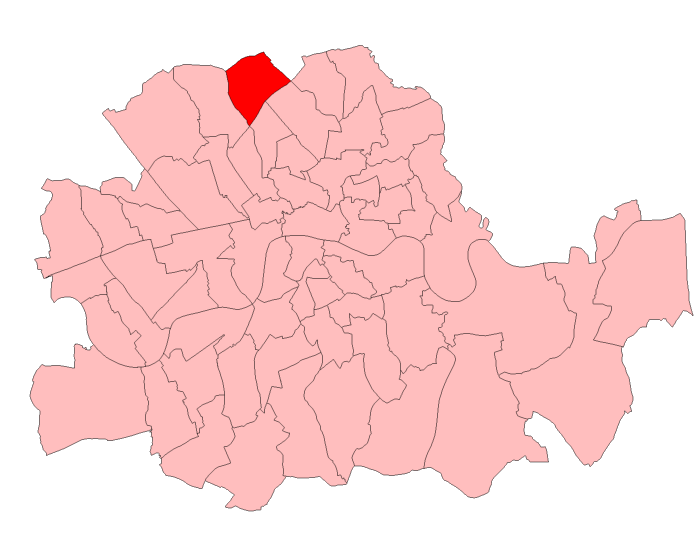
Islington North in London 1918–50

Under the next redistribution of seats by the Representation of the People Act 1918 constituencies in the County of London were defined in terms of wards of the metropolitan boroughs created in 1900. Islington North comprised three wards of the Metropolitan Borough of Islington: Tollington, Tufnell and Upper Holloway.

=== 1950–1974 ===
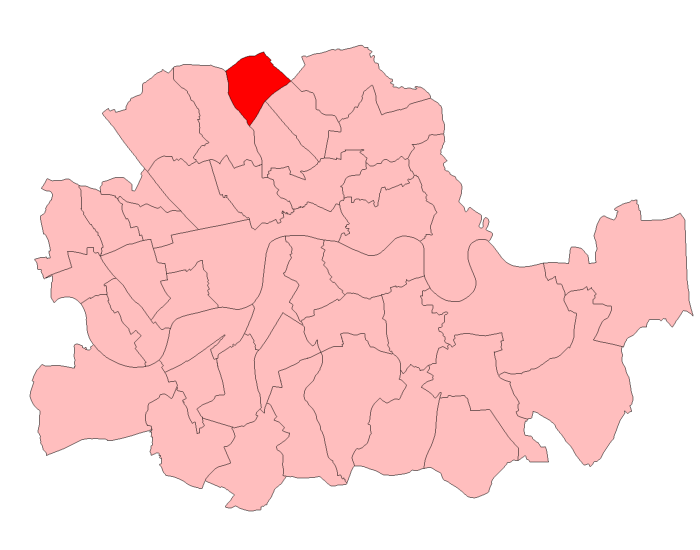
Islington North in London 1950–74

At the next redistribution of seats by the Representation of the People Act 1948 the constituency was again defined as Tollington, Tufnell and Upper Holloway wards of the Metropolitan Borough of Islington, with boundaries as they existed at the end of 1947.

=== 1974–1983 ===
In 1965 local government in Greater London was reorganised, with the formation of London boroughs. The changes were reflected in parliamentary boundaries from 1974. The London Borough of Islington was divided into three constituencies. Islington North was defined as comprising seven wards: Highview, Hillmarton, Hillrise, Junction, Parkway, St. George's and Station.

=== 1983–1997 ===
In 1983 the parliamentary representation of Islington was reduced to two constituencies. The new, enlarged, Islington North was formed from ten wards of the borough as they existed in February 1983. These were Gillespie, Highbury, Highview, Hillrise, Junction, Mildmay, Quadrant, St. George's, Sussex and Tollington wards.

=== 1997–2010 ===
In 1997 there were only slight boundary changes, with the constituency defined as the same ten wards with their boundaries as they existed on 1 June 1994.

=== Since 2010 ===
The seat covers the northern half of the London Borough of Islington, which includes the areas of Holloway, Highbury, Tufnell Park, Upper Holloway and Archway.

From 2010 until 2022, the constituency comprised the following eight electoral wards: Finsbury Park, Highbury East, Highbury West, Hillrise, Junction, Mildmay, St. George's and Tollington.

Following a review of local authority ward boundaries which came into effect on 4 May 2022, the seat now comprises the following eight London Borough of Islington wards: Arsenal; Finsbury Park; Highbury; Hillrise; Junction; Mildmay; Tollington; Tufnell Park.

The boundaries of the constituency were not changed as part of the 2023 review of Westminster constituencies.

These boundaries have been considerably changed since 1970, when Islington returned three MPs and shared another with Hackney. This reflects the depopulation of central London on a lowering of adult occupancy of households and the local authority has replaced tower blocks. The core of the constituency was the area north of Seven Sisters Road and Camden Road. At the Fifth Periodic Review of Westminster constituencies begun in 2012 the seat was approximately 1,300 electors below the electoral quota and the highest concentration of elector density nationally. The criteria of successive reviews emphasise equal electorates as well as restricting seats to one or, if unavoidable, two local authority areas.

== Political history ==
The constituency was held by the Labour Party without interruption from a by-election in 1937 until former Labour member Michael O'Halloran defected to the Social Democratic Party in 1981. He subsequently left the Social Democrats in 1983 and held the seat under the label "Independent Labour", unaffiliated with his first party of a similar name, until his departure the same year.

Jeremy Corbyn was subsequently elected as a Labour Party member, and he himself would also become an independent after four decades in the seat. Having led the Labour Party from 2015-2020, through two elections, he would step down from the leadership due to a perceived failure in 2019. His successor Keir Starmer would have him ejected from the party over differing stances on the Israeli occupation of Palestine, and a politicised disciplinary process around allegations of antisemitism, which conflated opposition to Zionism with antisemitism.

After sitting as an independent whilst seeking his re-admittance to the party, he would regain the seat as an independent in 2024, against the Labour candidate, after being denied the opportunity of rejoining Labour. In 2025 he would subsequently co-lead the foundation of a new party, Your Party, which he at first did not adopt the label of in parliament. Having since became leader of Your Party, he would finally adopt it's label in 2026, representing another change of livery for the seat.

From 1945 to 2019, Labour's smallest majority was 10.4% of the vote, in a by-election in 1969, on a very low turnout.

As a Labour candidate, Corbyn had his smallest majority (15.3%) in 1983, when he was first elected, and his largest (60.5%) in 2017, when he was leader of the party. In the ten elections since Corbyn began representing the constituency, the Conservatives have finished in second place five times while the Liberal Democrats have also been runners up on five occasions. The 2015 result made the seat the 26th safest of Labour's 232 seats by percentage of majority.

In the 2016 referendum to leave the European Union, the constituency voted remain by 78.4%. This was the fifth highest support for remain for a constituency.

== Members of Parliament ==
| Election | Member | Party |
|---|---|---|
| 1885 | Sir George Trout Bartley | Conservative |
| 1906 | David Waterlow | Liberal |
| Dec 1910 | Sir George Touche | Conservative |
| 1918 | Sir Newton Moore | Conservative |
| 1923 | Sir Henry Cowan | Conservative |
| 1929 | Robert Young | Labour |
| 1931 | Albert Goodman | Conservative |
| 1937 | Leslie Haden-Guest | Labour |
| 1950 | Moelwyn Hughes | Labour |
| 1951 | Wilfred Fienburgh | Labour |
| 1958 | Gerry Reynolds | Labour |
| 1969 | Michael O'Halloran | Labour |
| 1981 | Michael O'Halloran | SDP |
| 1983 | Michael O'Halloran | Independent Labour |
| 1983 | Jeremy Corbyn | Labour |
| 2020 | Jeremy Corbyn | Independent |
| 2024 | Jeremy Corbyn | Independent |
| 2026 | Jeremy Corbyn | Your Party |

== Election results ==
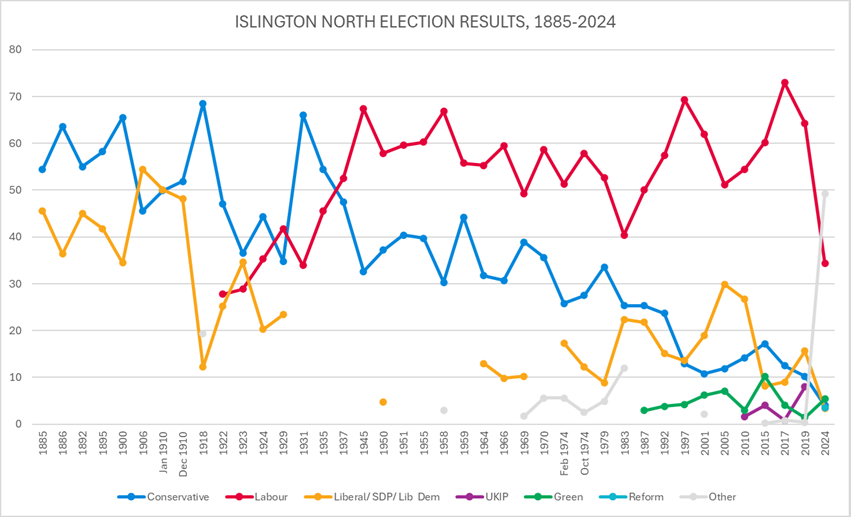
Election results 1885–2024

| Elections: | 2020s | 2010s | 2000s | 1990s | 1980s | 1970s | 1960s | 1950s | 1940s | 1930s | 1920s | 1910s |

=== Elections in the 2020s ===
General election 2024: Islington North
| Party | Candidate | Votes | % | ±% |
|---|---|---|---|---|
| Independent | Jeremy Corbyn | 24,120 | 49.2 | N/A |
| Labour | Praful Nargund | 16,873 | 34.4 | −29.9 |
| Green | Sheridan Kates | 2,660 | 5.4 | −2.6 |
| Conservative | Karen Harries | 1,950 | 4.0 | −6.2 |
| Reform | Martyn Nelson | 1,710 | 3.5 | +2.1 |
| Liberal Democrats | Vikas Aggarwal | 1,661 | 3.4 | −12.2 |
| Independent | Paul Josling | 32 | 0.1 | +0.1 |
| Majority | | 7,247 | 14.8 | N/A |
| Turnout | | 49,006 | 67.5 | −4.1 |
| Registered electors | | 72,582 | | |
| Independent gain from Labour | | Swing | | |

=== Elections in the 2010s ===
General election 2019: Islington North
| Party | Candidate | Votes | % | ±% |
|---|---|---|---|---|
| Labour | Jeremy Corbyn | 34,603 | 64.3 | −8.7 |
| Liberal Democrats | Nick Wakeling | 8,415 | 15.6 | +6.6 |
| Conservative | James Clark | 5,483 | 10.2 | −2.3 |
| Green | Caroline Russell | 4,326 | 8.0 | +3.9 |
| Brexit Party | Yosef David | 742 | 1.4 | N/A |
| Monster Raving Loony | Nick The Incredible Flying Brick | 236 | 0.4 | +0.2 |
| Majority | | 26,188 | 48.7 | −11.8 |
| Turnout | | 53,805 | 71.6 | −1.8 |
| Registered electors | | 75,162 | | |
| Labour hold | | Swing | | |

General election 2017: Islington North
| Party | Candidate | Votes | % | ±% |
|---|---|---|---|---|
| Labour | Jeremy Corbyn | 40,086 | 73.0 | +12.8 |
| Conservative | James Clark | 6,871 | 12.5 | −4.7 |
| Liberal Democrats | Keith Angus | 4,946 | 9.0 | +0.9 |
| Green | Caroline Russell | 2,229 | 4.1 | −6.1 |
| UKIP | Keith Fraser | 413 | 0.8 | −3.2 |
| Independent | Michael Foster | 208 | 0.4 | N/A |
| Monster Raving Loony | Knigel Knapp | 106 | 0.2 | N/A |
| Independent | Susanne Cameron-Blackie | 41 | 0.1 | N/A |
| Socialist (GB) | Bill Martin | 21 | 0.1 | −0.2 |
| Communist League | Andres Mendoza | 7 | 0.03 | N/A |
| Majority | | 33,215 | 60.5 | +17.5 |
| Turnout | | 54,928 | 73.4 | +6.3 |
| Registered electors | | 74,831 | | |
| Labour hold | | Swing | +8.7 | |

General election 2015: Islington North
| Party | Candidate | Votes | % | ±% |
|---|---|---|---|---|
| Labour | Jeremy Corbyn | 29,659 | 60.2 | +5.7 |
| Conservative | Alex Burghart | 8,465 | 17.2 | +3.0 |
| Green | Caroline Russell | 5,043 | 10.2 | +7.2 |
| Liberal Democrats | Julian Gregory | 3,984 | 8.1 | −18.6 |
| UKIP | Greg Clough | 1,971 | 4.0 | +2.4 |
| Socialist (GB) | Bill Martin | 112 | 0.2 | N/A |
| Majority | | 21,194 | 43.0 | +15.2 |
| Turnout | | 49,234 | 67.1 | +1.7 |
| Registered electors | | 73,326 | | |
| Labour hold | | Swing | | |

General election 2010: Islington North
| Party | Candidate | Votes | % | ±% |
|---|---|---|---|---|
| Labour | Jeremy Corbyn | 24,276 | 54.5 | +3.3 |
| Liberal Democrats | Rhodri Jamieson-Ball | 11,875 | 26.7 | −3.2 |
| Conservative | Adrian Berrill-Cox | 6,339 | 14.2 | +2.3 |
| Green | Emma Dixon | 1,348 | 3.0 | −4.1 |
| UKIP | Dominic Lennon | 716 | 1.6 | N/A |
| Majority | | 12,401 | 27.8 | +6.5 |
| Turnout | | 44,554 | 65.4 | +11.5 |
| Registered electors | | 68,119 | | |
| Labour hold | | Swing | +3.3 | |

=== Elections in the 2000s ===
General election 2005: Islington North
| Party | Candidate | Votes | % | ±% |
|---|---|---|---|---|
| Labour | Jeremy Corbyn | 16,118 | 51.2 | −10.7 |
| Liberal Democrats | Laura Willoughby | 9,402 | 29.9 | +10.9 |
| Conservative | Nicola Talbot | 3,740 | 11.9 | +1.1 |
| Green | Jon Nott | 2,234 | 7.1 | +0.9 |
| Majority | | 6,716 | 21.3 | −21.6 |
| Turnout | | 31,494 | 53.9 | +5.1 |
| Registered electors | | 58,428 | | |
| Labour hold | | Swing | −10.8 | |

General election 2001: Islington North
| Party | Candidate | Votes | % | ±% |
|---|---|---|---|---|
| Labour | Jeremy Corbyn | 18,699 | 61.9 | −7.4 |
| Liberal Democrats | Laura Willoughby | 5,741 | 19.0 | +5.4 |
| Conservative | Neil Rands | 3,249 | 10.8 | −2.1 |
| Green | Christopher Ashby | 1,876 | 6.2 | +2.0 |
| Socialist Labour | Stephen Cook | 512 | 1.7 | N/A |
| Reform 2000 Party | Emine Hassan | 139 | 0.5 | N/A |
| Majority | | 12,958 | 42.9 | −12.7 |
| Turnout | | 30,216 | 48.8 | −13.7 |
| Registered electors | | 61,970 | | |
| Labour hold | | Swing | −6.4 | |

=== Elections in the 1990s ===
General election 1997: Islington North
| Party | Candidate | Votes | % | ±% |
|---|---|---|---|---|
| Labour | Jeremy Corbyn | 24,834 | 69.3 | +11.9 |
| Liberal Democrats | James Kempton | 4,879 | 13.6 | −1.5 |
| Conservative | Simon Fawthrop | 4,631 | 12.9 | −10.8 |
| Green | Christopher Ashby | 1,516 | 4.2 | +0.4 |
| Majority | | 19,955 | 55.6 | +21.9 |
| Turnout | | 35,860 | 62.5 | −4.1 |
| Registered electors | | 57,385 | | |
| Labour hold | | Swing | +6.7 | |

General election 1992: Islington North
| Party | Candidate | Votes | % | ±% |
|---|---|---|---|---|
| Labour | Jeremy Corbyn | 21,742 | 57.4 | +7.4 |
| Conservative | Lurline Champagnie | 8,958 | 23.7 | −1.6 |
| Liberal Democrats | Sarah Ludford | 5,732 | 15.1 | −6.7 |
| Green | Christopher Ashby | 1,420 | 3.8 | +0.9 |
| Majority | | 12,784 | 33.7 | +9.0 |
| Turnout | | 37,852 | 66.6 | +0.1 |
| Registered electors | | 56,270 | | |
| Labour hold | | Swing | | |

=== Elections in the 1980s ===
General election 1987: Islington North
| Party | Candidate | Votes | % | ±% |
|---|---|---|---|---|
| Labour | Jeremy Corbyn | 19,577 | 50.0 | +9.6 |
| Conservative | Ernest Noad | 9,920 | 25.3 | ±0.0 |
| SDP | Alan Whelan | 8,560 | 21.8 | −0.6 |
| Green | Christopher Ashby | 1,131 | 2.9 | N/A |
| Majority | | 9,657 | 24.7 | +9.6 |
| Turnout | | 39,188 | 66.5 | ±0.0 |
| Registered electors | | 58,917 | | |
| Labour hold | | Swing | | |

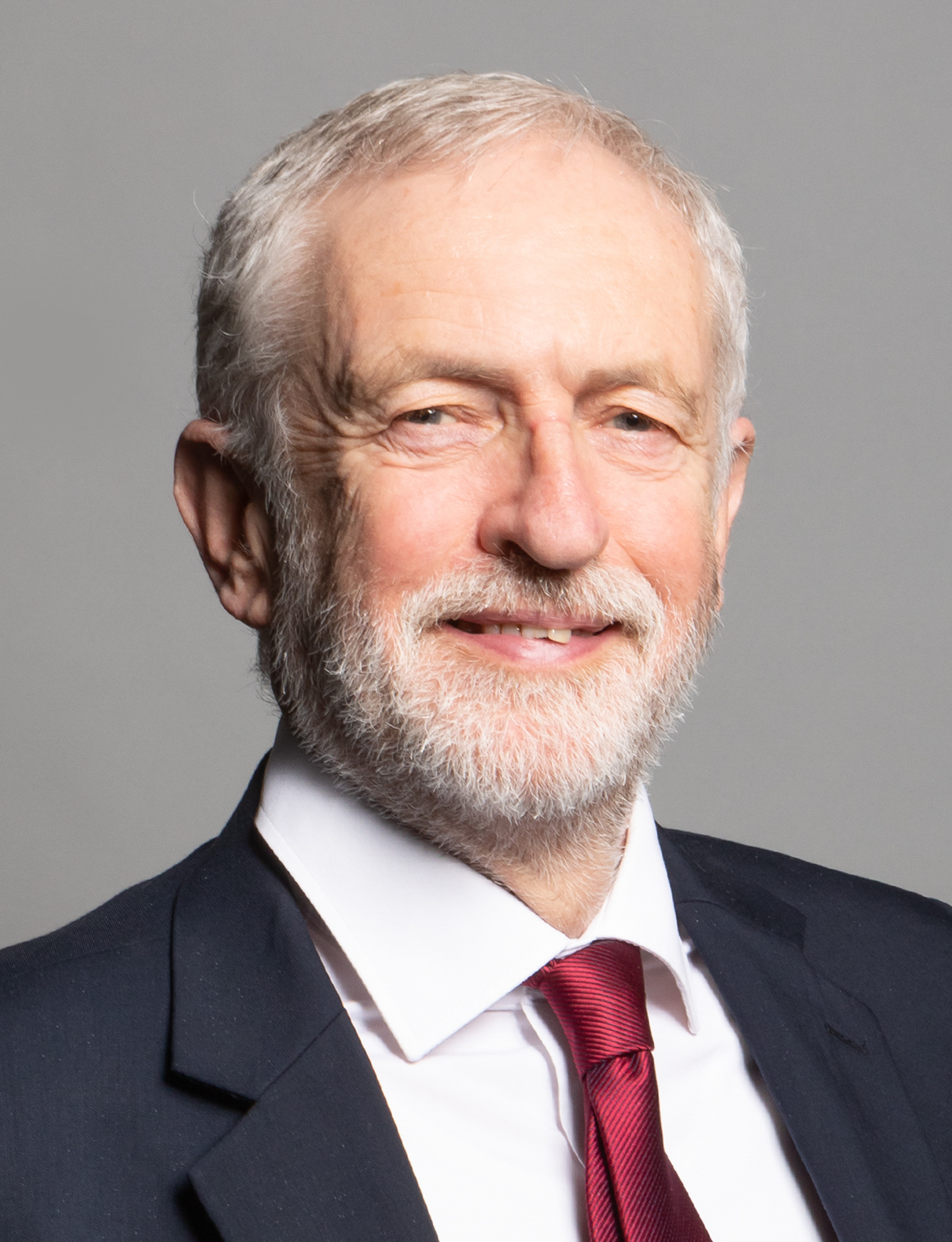
Corbyn

General election 1983: Islington North
| Party | Candidate | Votes | % | ±% |
|---|---|---|---|---|
| Labour | Jeremy Corbyn | 14,951 | 40.4 | −12.2 |
| Conservative | David A. Coleman | 9,344 | 25.3 | −8.3 |
| SDP | John Grant | 8,268 | 22.4 | +13.5 |
| Independent Labour | Michael O'Halloran | 4,091 | 11.1 | N/A |
| BNP | L. A. D. Bearsford-Walker | 176 | 0.5 | N/A |
| Independent | Roy A. J. Lincoln | 134 | 0.4 | N/A |
| Majority | | 5,607 | 15.1 | −3.9 |
| Turnout | | 36,964 | 66.5 | +5.3 |
| Registered electors | | 59,984 | | |
| Labour hold | | Swing | | |

=== Elections in the 1970s ===
General election 1979: Islington North
| Party | Candidate | Votes | % | ±% |
|---|---|---|---|---|
| Labour | Michael O'Halloran | 12,317 | 52.6 | −5.3 |
| Conservative | Neil Kerr | 7,861 | 33.6 | +6.1 |
| Liberal | (Hugh) Kenneth Clarke | 2,079 | 8.9 | −3.3 |
| National Front | Stephen Hook | 501 | 2.1 | N/A |
| Socialist Unity | Michael Simpson | 438 | 1.9 | N/A |
| Workers Revolutionary | Roy McCullogh | 217 | 0.9 | N/A |
| Majority | | 4,456 | 19.0 | −11.4 |
| Turnout | | 23,413 | 61.2 | +7.0 |
| Registered electors | | 38,253 | | |
| Labour hold | | Swing | | |

General election October 1974: Islington North
| Party | Candidate | Votes | % | ±% |
|---|---|---|---|---|
| Labour | Michael O'Halloran | 12,973 | 57.9 | +6.6 |
| Conservative | Charles Wellesley | 6,155 | 27.5 | +1.7 |
| Liberal | Michael Davenport | 2,736 | 12.2 | −5.1 |
| Labour and Democrat | D. Fallon | 558 | 2.5 | +0.3 |
| Majority | | 6,818 | 30.4 | +4.9 |
| Turnout | | 22,422 | 54.2 | −8.9 |
| Registered electors | | 41,390 | | |
| Labour hold | | Swing | | |

General election February 1974: Islington North
| Party | Candidate | Votes | % | ±% |
|---|---|---|---|---|
| Labour | Michael O'Halloran | 13,332 | 51.3 | −7.4 |
| Conservative | Mark Wolfson | 6,704 | 25.8 | −9.8 |
| Liberal | Michael Davenport | 4,503 | 17.3 | N/A |
| National Front | J. Score | 871 | 3.4 | −2.2 |
| Labour and Democrat | D. Fallon | 570 | 2.2 | N/A |
| Majority | | 6,628 | 25.5 | +2.2 |
| Turnout | | 25,980 | 63.1 | +14.1 |
| Registered electors | | 41,185 | | |
| Labour hold | | Swing | | |

General election 1970: Islington North
| Party | Candidate | Votes | % | ±% |
|---|---|---|---|---|
| Labour | Michael O'Halloran | 13,010 | 58.7 | −0.8 |
| Conservative | Andrew Pearce | 7,862 | 35.6 | +4.9 |
| National Front | Brian Green | 1,232 | 5.6 | N/A |
| Majority | | 5,148 | 23.1 | −5.7 |
| Turnout | | 22,104 | 49.0 | −5.2 |
| Registered electors | | 45,083 | | |
| Labour hold | | Swing | | |

=== Elections in the 1960s ===
1969 Islington North by-election
| Party | Candidate | Votes | % | ±% |
|---|---|---|---|---|
| Labour | Michael O'Halloran | 7,288 | 49.2 | −10.2 |
| Conservative | Andrew Pearce | 5,754 | 38.9 | +8.2 |
| Liberal | Eric G. Thwaites | 1,514 | 10.2 | +0.4 |
| Independent Socialist | Austin Williams | 245 | 1.7 | N/A |
| Majority | | 1,534 | 10.4 | −18.4 |
| Turnout | | 14,801 | 32.8 | −21.4 |
| Registered electors | | 45,077 | | |
| Labour hold | | Swing | −9.2 | |

General election 1966: Islington North
| Party | Candidate | Votes | % | ±% |
|---|---|---|---|---|
| Labour | Gerry Reynolds | 16,188 | 59.46 | +4.15 |
| Conservative | Michael Morris | 8,357 | 30.69 | −1.06 |
| Liberal | Eric G. Thwaites | 2,682 | 9.85 | −3.10 |
| Majority | | 7,831 | 28.77 | +5.21 |
| Turnout | | 27,227 | 54.23 | −0.47 |
| Registered electors | | 50,203 | | |
| Labour hold | | Swing | | |

General election 1964: Islington North
| Party | Candidate | Votes | % | ±% |
|---|---|---|---|---|
| Labour | Gerry Reynolds | 15,525 | 55.31 | −0.49 |
| Conservative | Victor Lyon | 8,912 | 31.75 | −12.45 |
| Liberal | Eric G. Thwaites | 3,634 | 12.95 | N/A |
| Majority | | 6,613 | 23.56 | +11.96 |
| Turnout | | 28,071 | 54.70 | −7.30 |
| Registered electors | | 51,315 | | |
| Labour hold | | Swing | | |

=== Elections in the 1950s ===
General election 1959: Islington North
| Party | Candidate | Votes | % | ±% |
|---|---|---|---|---|
| Labour | Gerry Reynolds | 18,718 | 55.8 | −4.5 |
| Conservative | Ronald Bartle | 14,820 | 44.2 | +4.5 |
| Majority | | 3,898 | 11.6 | −9.0 |
| Turnout | | 33,538 | 62.0 | −2.7 |
| Registered electors | | 54,120 | | |
| Labour hold | | Swing | −12.5 | |

1958 Islington North by-election
| Party | Candidate | Votes | % | ±% |
|---|---|---|---|---|
| Labour | Gerry Reynolds | 13,159 | 66.8 | +6.5 |
| Conservative | Ronald Bartle | 5,968 | 30.3 | −9.4 |
| Ind. Labour Party | Jim McKie | 576 | 2.9 | N/A |
| Majority | | 7,461 | 36.5 | +15.9 |
| Turnout | | 19,703 | 35.6 | −29.1 |
| Registered electors | | 54,576 | | |
| Labour hold | | Swing | +7.9 | |

General election 1955: Islington North
| Party | Candidate | Votes | % | ±% |
|---|---|---|---|---|
| Labour | Wilfred Fienburgh | 22,100 | 60.3 | +0.7 |
| Conservative | Euan Mackinnon | 14,522 | 39.7 | −0.7 |
| Majority | | 7,578 | 20.6 | +1.4 |
| Turnout | | 36,622 | 64.7 | −13.1 |
| Registered electors | | 56,574 | | |
| Labour hold | | Swing | +0.7 | |

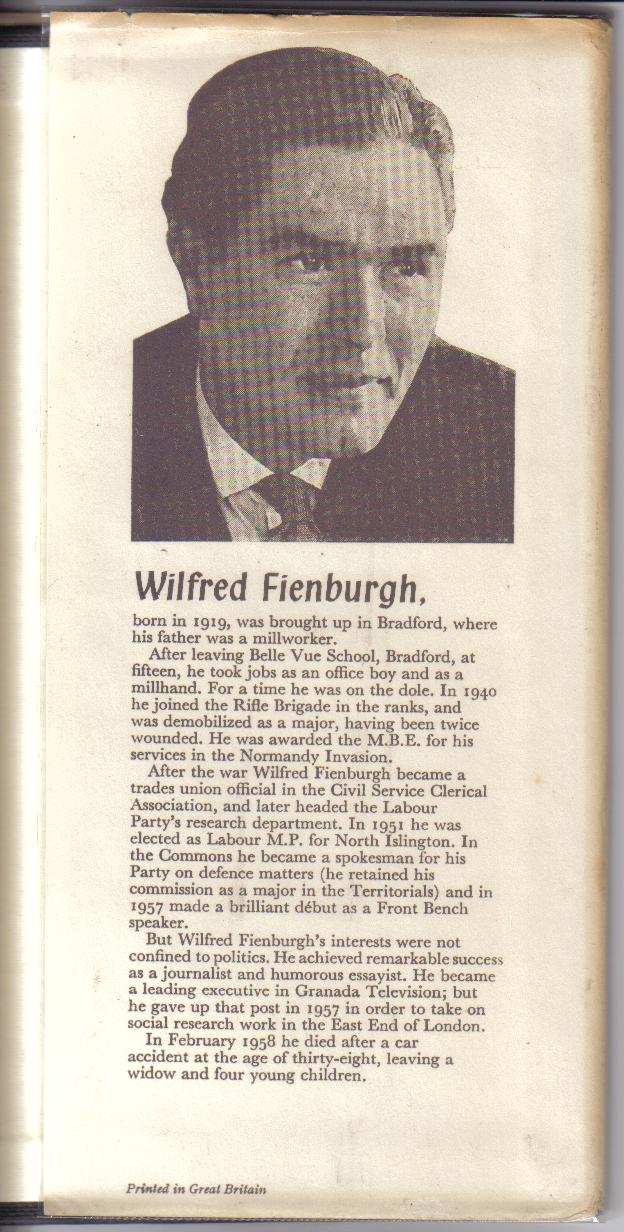
Fienburgh

General election 1951: Islington North
| Party | Candidate | Votes | % | ±% |
|---|---|---|---|---|
| Labour | Wilfred Fienburgh | 27,406 | 59.6 | +1.7 |
| Conservative | Graham Page | 18,541 | 40.4 | +3.2 |
| Majority | | 8,865 | 19.2 | −1.5 |
| Turnout | | 45,947 | 77.8 | +1.1 |
| Registered electors | | 59,039 | | |
| Labour hold | | Swing | −0.8 | |

General election 1950: Islington North
| Party | Candidate | Votes | % | ±% |
|---|---|---|---|---|
| Labour | Moelwyn Hughes | 26,354 | 57.9 | −9.5 |
| Conservative | Graham Page | 16,935 | 37.2 | +4.6 |
| Liberal | Robert Eric Burns | 2,189 | 4.8 | N/A |
| Majority | | 9,419 | 20.7 | −14.1 |
| Turnout | | 45,478 | 76.7 | +9.5 |
| Registered electors | | 59,086 | | |
| Labour hold | | Swing | −7.1 | |

=== Elections in the 1940s ===
General election 1945: Islington North
| Party | Candidate | Votes | % | ±% |
|---|---|---|---|---|
| Labour | Leslie Haden-Guest | 23,234 | 67.4 | +14.9 |
| Conservative | Charles Rhys | 11,240 | 32.6 | −14.9 |
| Majority | | 11,994 | 34.8 | +29.8 |
| Turnout | | 23,236 | 67.2 | +26.8 |
| Registered electors | | 51,324 | | |
| Labour hold | | Swing | | |

=== Elections in the 1930s ===
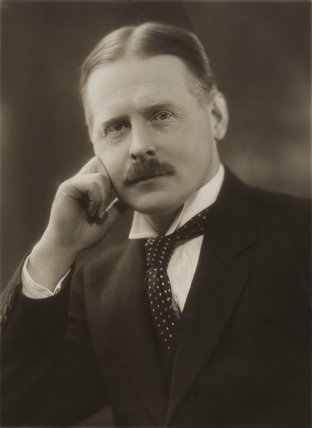
Guest

1937 Islington North by-election
| Party | Candidate | Votes | % | ±% |
|---|---|---|---|---|
| Labour | Leslie Haden-Guest | 13,523 | 52.5 | +6.9 |
| Conservative | Wilfrid Sugden | 12,227 | 47.5 | −6.9 |
| Majority | | 1,296 | 5.0 | N/A |
| Turnout | | 25,750 | 40.4 | −19.3 |
| Registered electors | | 63,747 | | |
| Labour gain from Conservative | | Swing | +6.9 | |

General election 1935: Islington North
| Party | Candidate | Votes | % | ±% |
|---|---|---|---|---|
| Conservative | Albert Goodman | 20,744 | 54.44 | −11.63 |
| Labour | Robert Young | 17,359 | 45.56 | +11.63 |
| Majority | | 3,385 | 8.88 | −23.26 |
| Turnout | | 38,103 | 59.69 | −8.65 |
| Registered electors | | 63,835 | | |
| Conservative hold | | Swing | | |

General election 1931: Islington North
| Party | Candidate | Votes | % | ±% |
|---|---|---|---|---|
| Conservative | Albert Goodman | 28,790 | 66.07 | +31.27 |
| Labour | Robert Young | 14,783 | 33.93 | −8.87 |
| Majority | | 14,007 | 32.14 | +25.14 |
| Turnout | | 43,573 | 66.54 | −1.46 |
| Registered electors | | 65,486 | | |
| Conservative gain from Labour | | Swing | | |

=== Elections in the 1920s ===
General election 1929: Islington North
| Party | Candidate | Votes | % | ±% |
|---|---|---|---|---|
| Labour | Robert Young | 18,272 | 41.8 | +6.5 |
| Unionist | Gordon Touche | 15,207 | 34.8 | −9.6 |
| Liberal | Domini Crosfield | 10,210 | 23.4 | +3.1 |
| Majority | | 3,065 | 7.0 | N/A |
| Turnout | | 43,689 | 68.0 | −4.2 |
| Registered electors | | 64,241 | | |
| Labour gain from Unionist | | Swing | +8.1 | |

General election 1924: Islington North
| Party | Candidate | Votes | % | ±% |
|---|---|---|---|---|
| Unionist | Henry Cowan | 15,562 | 44.4 | +7.9 |
| Labour | Ewart Culpin | 12,376 | 35.3 | +6.4 |
| Liberal | Norman Thomas Carr Sargant | 7,136 | 20.3 | −14.3 |
| Majority | | 3,186 | 9.1 | +7.2 |
| Turnout | | 35,074 | 72.2 | +10.6 |
| Registered electors | | 48,573 | | |
| Unionist hold | | Swing | +0.8 | |

Henry Cowan

General election 1923: Islington North
| Party | Candidate | Votes | % | ±% |
|---|---|---|---|---|
| Unionist | Henry Cowan | 10,802 | 36.5 | −10.5 |
| Liberal | Norman Thomas Carr Sargant | 10,219 | 34.6 | +9.4 |
| Labour | George Bennett | 8,556 | 28.9 | +1.1 |
| Majority | | 583 | 1.9 | −17.3 |
| Turnout | | 29,577 | 61.6 | +0.5 |
| Registered electors | | 48,002 | | |
| Unionist hold | | Swing | −10.0 | |

General election 1922: Islington North
| Party | Candidate | Votes | % | ±% |
|---|---|---|---|---|
| Unionist | Newton Moore | 13,520 | 47.0 | −21.5 |
| Labour | Edith Picton-Turbervill | 7,993 | 27.8 | N/A |
| Liberal | Norman Thomas Carr Sargant | 7,256 | 25.2 | +13.0 |
| Majority | | 5,527 | 19.2 | −30.0 |
| Turnout | | 28,769 | 61.1 | +11.5 |
| Registered electors | | 47,059 | | |
| Unionist hold | | Swing | −17.3 | |

=== Elections in the 1910s ===
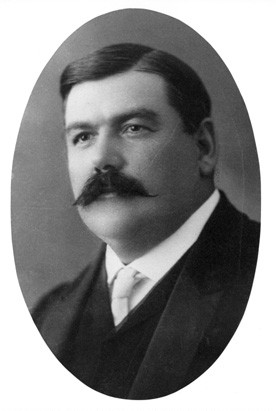
Moore

General election 1918: Islington North
| Party | | Candidate | Votes | % | ±% |
|---|---|---|---|---|---|
| C | Unionist | Newton Moore | 14,183 | 68.5 | +16.6 |
| | British Socialist Party | *John Arnall | 4,000 | 19.3 | N/A |
| | Liberal | Norman Thomas Carr Sargant | 2,529 | 12.2 | −35.9 |
| Majority | | | 10,183 | 49.2 | +45.4 |
| Turnout | | | 20,712 | 49.6 | −32.8 |
| Registered electors | | | 41,769 | | |
| | Unionist hold | | Swing | +26.3 | |
C indicates candidate endorsed by the coalition government.

* Craig lists Arnall as an Independent Labour candidate.

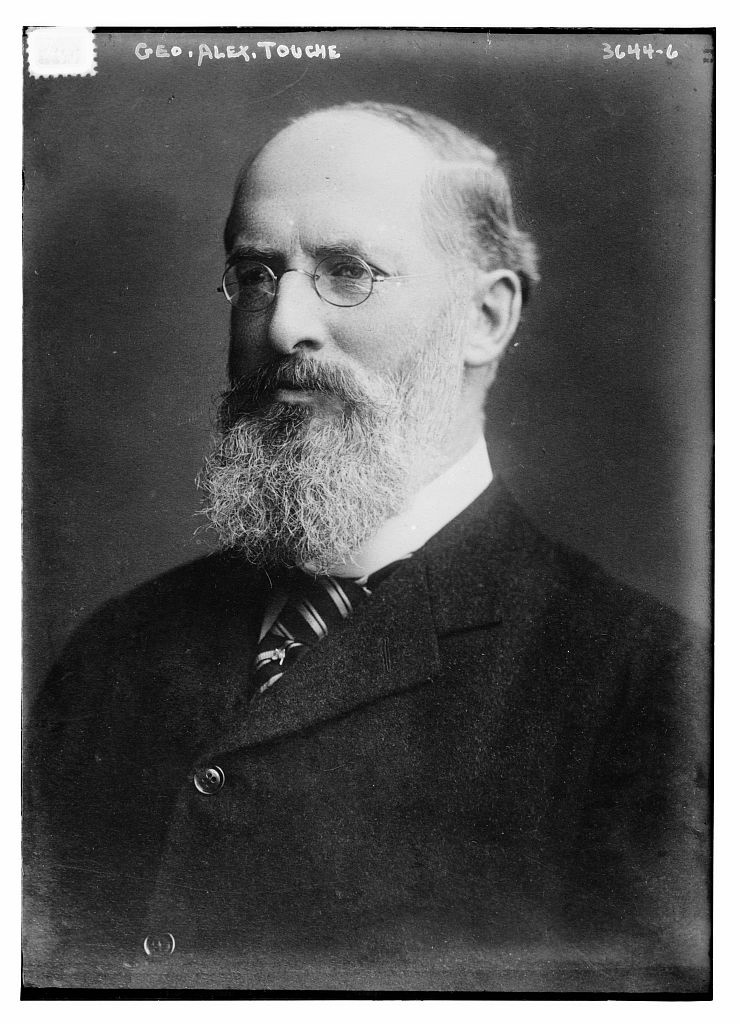
Touche

General election December 1910: Islington North
| Party | Candidate | Votes | % | ±% |
|---|---|---|---|---|
| Conservative | George Touche | 5,428 | 51.9 | +2.0 |
| Liberal | David Waterlow | 5,022 | 48.1 | −2.0 |
| Majority | | 406 | 3.8 | N/A |
| Turnout | | 10,450 | 82.4 | −4.8 |
| Registered electors | | 12,677 | | |
| Conservative gain from Liberal | | Swing | +2.0 | |

General election January 1910: Islington North
| Party | Candidate | Votes | % | ±% |
|---|---|---|---|---|
| Liberal | David Waterlow | 5,543 | 50.1 | −4.4 |
| Conservative | George Touche | 5,512 | 49.9 | +4.4 |
| Majority | | 31 | 0.2 | −8.8 |
| Turnout | | 11,055 | 87.2 | +6.9 |
| Registered electors | | 12,677 | | |
| Liberal hold | | Swing | −4.4 | |

=== Elections in the 1900s ===
Waterlow

General election 1906: Islington North
| Party | Candidate | Votes | % | ±% |
|---|---|---|---|---|
| Liberal | David Waterlow | 5,284 | 54.5 | +20.0 |
| Conservative | George Trout Bartley | 4,418 | 45.5 | −20.0 |
| Majority | | 866 | 9.0 | N/A |
| Turnout | | 9,702 | 80.3 | +18.0 |
| Registered electors | | 12,075 | | |
| Liberal gain from Conservative | | Swing | +20.0 | |

Rawlings

General election 1900: Islington North
| Party | Candidate | Votes | % | ±% |
|---|---|---|---|---|
| Conservative | George Trout Bartley | 4,881 | 65.5 | +7.3 |
| Liberal | Edmund Charles Rawlings | 2,567 | 34.5 | −7.3 |
| Majority | | 2,314 | 31.0 | +14.6 |
| Turnout | | 7,448 | 62.3 | −11.2 |
| Registered electors | | 11,964 | | |
| Conservative hold | | Swing | +7.3 | |

=== Elections in the 1890s ===
General election 1895: Islington North
| Party | Candidate | Votes | % | ±% |
|---|---|---|---|---|
| Conservative | George Trout Bartley | 4,626 | 58.2 | +3.2 |
| Liberal | Thomas Bateman Napier | 3,317 | 41.8 | −3.2 |
| Majority | | 1,309 | 16.4 | +6.4 |
| Turnout | | 7,943 | 73.5 | −1.6 |
| Registered electors | | 10,803 | | |
| Conservative hold | | Swing | +3.2 | |

General election 1892: Islington North
| Party | Candidate | Votes | % | ±% |
|---|---|---|---|---|
| Conservative | George Trout Bartley | 4,456 | 55.0 | −8.6 |
| Liberal | James Hill | 3,646 | 45.0 | +8.6 |
| Majority | | 810 | 10.0 | −17.2 |
| Turnout | | 8,102 | 75.1 | +5.2 |
| Registered electors | | 10,782 | | |
| Conservative hold | | Swing | −8.6 | |

=== Elections in the 1880s ===
General election 1886: Islington North
| Party | Candidate | Votes | % | ±% |
|---|---|---|---|---|
| Conservative | George Trout Bartley | 3,456 | 63.6 | +9.2 |
| Liberal | Peter Clayden | 1,976 | 36.4 | −9.2 |
| Majority | | 1,480 | 27.2 | +18.4 |
| Turnout | | 5,432 | 69.9 | −13.9 |
| Registered electors | | 7,774 | | |
| Conservative hold | | Swing | +9.2 | |

General election 1885: Islington North
| Party | Candidate | Votes | % | ±% |
|---|---|---|---|---|
| Conservative | George Trout Bartley | 3,545 | 54.4 | |
| Liberal | Samuel Danks Waddy | 2,972 | 45.6 | |
| Majority | | 573 | 8.8 | |
| Turnout | | 6,517 | 83.8 | |
| Registered electors | | 7,774 | | |
| Conservative win (new seat) | | | | |

== Further information ==
A short film was made about the 1969 by-election. This highlighted the importance of the local Irish community, the poor local housing conditions (the opening line talks of "a crowded, crumbling constituency") and the relatively low turn-outs at previous elections. The film is now available through British Pathé Archive.

Michael O'Halloran, elected Labour MP for Islington North in 1969, was the subject of an investigation in the early-1970s by The Sunday Times newspaper. They highlighted his background with a local building company and the local Irish community and queried the tactics of his supporters during his selection as candidate.

O'Halloran defected to the SDP in September 1981, as did both of the other Islington MPs. However the Boundary Commission cut the number of constituencies in Islington from three to two. O'Halloran sought selection as the SDP candidate for the revised Islington North constituency but the local SDP association selected John Grant, then-SDP (elected as Labour) MP for Islington Central, as their official candidate. In February 1983, O'Halloran resigned his membership of the SDP and sat in Parliament as an "Independent Labour" member, supporting the Parliamentary Labour Party. Despite this, he failed to regain the Labour Party nomination for the 1983 general election and he was defeated by the new Labour candidate, Jeremy Corbyn, and finished in fourth place with 11.1% of the vote.

Corbyn defeated Paul Boateng for the Labour Party selection. Boateng subsequently became the first Black Cabinet Minister in the UK.

== See also ==
- List of parliamentary constituencies in London
- List of parliamentary constituencies in Islington

== Bibliography ==
- Iain Dale, ed. (2003). The Times House of Commons 1929, 1931, 1935. Politico's (reprint). ISBN 1-84275-033-X.
- The Times House of Commons 1945. The Times. 1945.
- The Times House of Commons 1950. The Times. 1950.
- The Times House of Commons 1955. The Times. 1955.
- Craig, F. W. S. (1983) [1969]. British parliamentary election results 1918–1949 (3rd ed.). Chichester: Parliamentary Research Services. ISBN 0-900178-06-X.

Parliament of the United Kingdom
| Preceded by Camberwell and Peckham | Constituency represented by the leader of the opposition 2015–2020 | Succeeded by Holborn and St Pancras |
