= Lyndon Harrison, Baron Harrison =

British politician (1947–2024)

The Right Honourable The Lord Harrison
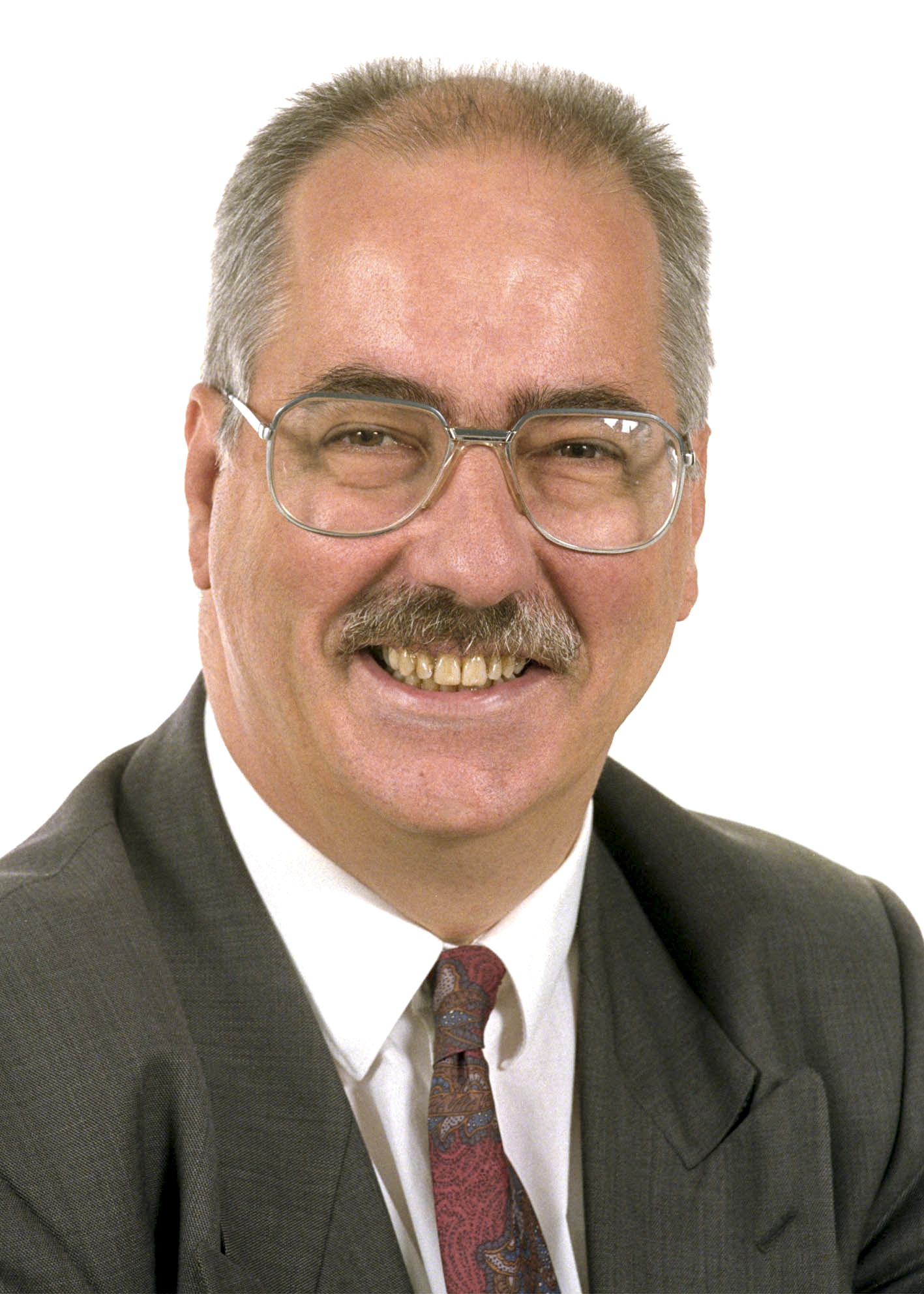
- Harrison in 1994

Member of the House of Lords
- Lord Temporal
- Life peerage 28 July 1999 – 11 July 2022

Member of the European Parliament for Cheshire West and Wirral Cheshire West (1989–1994)
- In office 1989–1999
- Preceded by: Andrew Pearce
- Succeeded by: Seat merged into North West England

Personal details
- Born: Lyndon Henry Arthur Harrison; 28 September 1947 Oxford, England
- Died: 18 October 2024 (aged 77) Chester, England
- Party: Labour
- Education: City of Oxford High School for Boys; University of Warwick (BA); University of Sussex (MA)

Lyndon Henry Arthur Harrison, Baron Harrison (28 September 1947 – 18 October 2024) was a British Labour Party politician.

== Early life ==
Harrison was born on 28 September 1947, to Charles and Edith Harrison. He was educated at the City of Oxford High School for Boys, a state school in Oxford, Oxfordshire. He then attended the University of Warwick, graduating in 1970 with a Bachelor of Arts (BA) degree in English and American studies. He continued his studies at the University of Sussex where he completed a Master of Arts (MA) degree in American studies in 1971.

== Political career ==
Harrison was a local councillor from the Labour Party from 1981 to 1990, serving on Cheshire County Council representing the Division of Sealand and College. He was Member of the European Parliament (MEP) from 1989 to 1999, representing the Cheshire West constituency. In the 1999 election Harrison originally was given a position on Labour's party list in the Wales constituency; however, after protests by Glenys Kinnock, Harrison announced he would retire from the European Parliament, giving the position to North Wales MEP Joe Wilson, who had originally been excluded from the list.

He was created a life peer on 28 July 1999 taking the title Baron Harrison, of Chester in the County of Cheshire. Lord Harrison spoke regularly in the House of Lords until his retirement on 11 July 2022.

== Personal life and death ==
Harrison was a Humanist. He was a member of the All Party Parliamentary Humanist Group and a Distinguished Supporter of Humanists UK. He was also an honorary associate of the National Secular Society.

Harrison died at the Countess of Chester Hospital on 18 October 2024, at the age of 77.

== Sources ==
- Profile, parliament.uk
- Birthdays, The Independent
- Profile on OpenSanctions, an open database of sanctions and persons of interest
- Profile at Public Accountability Initiatives LittleSis website

Orders of precedence in the United Kingdom
Preceded by The Lord Oxburgh	Gentlemen; Baron Harrison	Followed by The Lord Waldegrave of North Hill
