= 1958 Islington North by-election =

UK parliamentary by-election

The 1958 Islington North by-election was a parliamentary by-election held on 15 May 1958 for the UK House of Commons constituency of Islington North in Islington, North London.

== Background ==
The seat had become vacant when the sitting Labour Member of Parliament, Wilfred Fienburgh died on 3 February 1958, aged 38. He had held the seat since the 1951 general election.

== Result ==
The result was a victory for the Labour Party candidate, Gerry Reynolds, who won with a majority of 7,461 votes over the Conservative candidate Ronald Bartle. Reynolds represented the constituency until his own death in 1969 at the age of 42, triggering another by-election.

Islington North by-election, 1958
Party	Candidate	Votes	%	±%
Labour	Gerry Reynolds	13,159	66.8	+6.5
Conservative	Ronald Bartle	5,968	30.3	−9.4
Ind. Labour Party	Jim McKie	576	2.9	New
Majority		7,461	36.5	+15.9
Turnout		19,703	35.6	−29.1
Registered electors		54,576		
Labour hold		Swing	+7.9	

== See also ==
- Islington North (UK Parliament constituency)
- Islington
- 1937 Islington North by-election
- 1969 Islington North by-election
- List of United Kingdom by-elections
