= Cheshire West and Wirral (European Parliament constituency) =

Former European Parliament constituency

- European Parliament constituency
- Boundary within North West England (1994-1999)
- Member state: United Kingdom
- Created: 1994
- Dissolved: 1999
- MEPs: 1

Prior to its uniform adoption of proportional representation in 1999, the United Kingdom used first-past-the-post for the European elections in England, Scotland and Wales. The European Parliament constituencies used under that system were smaller than the later regional constituencies and only had one Member of the European Parliament each.

The constituency of Cheshire West and Wirral was one of them.

It consisted of the Westminster Parliament constituencies of Birkenhead, City of Chester, Crewe and Nantwich, Eddisbury, Ellesmere Port and Neston, Wallasey, Wirral South, and Wirral West.

== MEPs ==
Election	Member	Party
1994	Lyndon Harrison	Labour
1999	Constituency abolished, see North West England	

== Election results ==
European Parliament election, 1994: Cheshire West and Wirral
Party	Candidate	Votes	%	±%
Labour	Lyndon Harrison	106,160	53.6	
Conservative	David N. Senior	58,984	29.8	
Liberal Democrats	Ian A. Mottershaw	20,746	10.5	
British Home Rule	David J.E. Carson	6,167	3.1	
Green	Mike C. Money	5,096	2.6	
Natural Law	Andrew G. Wilmot	929	0.4	
Majority		47,176	23.8	
Turnout		198,082		
Labour win (new seat)				
