= Ahmad Muhammad Jamal =

Saudi Arabian journalist, author, and an Islamic Advocate

Ahmed Muhammed Jamal
- أحمد محمد جمال
- Born: 1924; Mecca
- Died: 1993 (aged 68–69)
- Education: Saudi Educational Institute
- Occupations: Journalist; Author
- Writing career
- Language: Arabic
- Notable work: A State in Islam. Fabrications about Islam

Ahmad Muhammed Jamal (1924–1993) was a Saudi Arabian journalist, author, and an Islamic Advocate, born in Mecca to a conservative surrounding.

He began his education in governmental schools there, and earned his diploma from the Saudi Educational Institute, but was unable to pursue his graduate studies.

Jamal received his education from Islamic scholar Alawi bin Abbas al-Maliki, and was known to have befriended Imam and schoolteacher, Hassan al-Banna.

Additionally, he was known for his wide contribution in the fields of philosophy, culture, advocacy, and education.

Jamal died at the age of 69 in Alexandria in 1993, and his body was translocated to Mecca where it was buried.

== Career ==
Jamal worked in jury, and was assigned as a writer in Shari’a Court. He was also involved in several administrative positions in the Ministry of Interior where he was director and assistant of the Department of Culture and Education, in addition to managing the department of passport and nationality.

He switched to journalism later on and worked as a secretary in the editing desk at AlBilad Saudi newspaper, later becoming editor-in-chief of Hira'a newspaper, in addition to AlNadwa newspaper, and the Islamic Solidarity magazine. He was a radio presenter at the Saudi Broadcast Services.

Moreover, he direct the series of Right Call which the magazine used to produce.

Jamal has had also been a member of the Saudi Shura Council since 1956 and retained his lifelong membership. He taught Islamic culture at King Abdulaziz University in Jeddah, then at Umm al-Qura University in Mecca, and was a member of the Islamic Conferences Fiqh Complex Organisation in Jeddah.

Furthermore, he was a member at the Department of Endowment in Mecca and the municipality council.

== Cultural experience ==
In addressing Islamic problems, Jamal was influenced by founder of Muslim Brotherhood Hassan al-Banna. They met in Masjid Al-Haram for some time, where Jamal was passionate about al-Banna's books, in addition to Sayyid Qutb's books.

Fascinated with cultural aspects, Jamal tended to reflect this passion upon literature, where he requested it to be imbued with the Islamic spirit.

Moreover, Jamal wrote numerous articles in the Saudi Arabian and Arab press revolving upon contemporary Islamic thinking and issues, along with giving lectures in various cities of Saudi Arabia.

Furthermore, he was selected by King Faisal as a member of the Committee for the Elaboration of the Statute of Governance.

== List of publications ==
- Contemporary Cases in the Court of Thought
- The Preciousness of Women
- At the Table of Qur'an
- Towards an Explicit Arab Policy
- Colonisation and Struggle
- |The Idea of a State in Islam
- The Divan of Reconnoiterers
- Fabrications about Islam

== Academic writings about Jamal ==
- Ahmad Jamal: The Man of Advocacy and Thought
- The Meccan Author
- Ahmad Mohammed Jamal: Advocate. Interpreter. Author.

== See also ==
- Hassan al-Banna
- Sayyid Qutb
