= Muhammad Husayn Zaydan =

Saudi historian and philosopher (1902–1992)

Muhammed Husayn Zaydan
- Born: 1906; Saudi Arabia
- Died: 1992 (aged 85–86); Saudi Arabia
- Resting place: Medina
- Occupation: Writer
- Writing career
- Language: Arabic

Muhammad Husayn Zaydan (1906–1992, Arabic: محمد حسين زيدان) was a Saudi historian, poet, and philosopher. He was also a prose writer, genealogist, jurist, experimenter, and scholar in humanities, hadith, oratory pulpits, forums, and councils, and one of the pioneers of the Renaissance discourse in the Hijaz. He was described as a historian fond of Islamic history and the history of Arab tribes, and one of those generally interested in Arab-Islamic culture. He summarized three political eras in Medina, the Ottoman, Hashemite, and Saudi eras in his book (Memories of the Three Covenants) issued in 1988, which was the last of his 18 books, including the biography of a hero 1984, the ideal approach to writing our history 1978, and a book of studies entitled: Conversations and Issues on the Middle East 1983. He died on May 2, 1992.

Zaydan first learned how to read in the al-Haraj market, then attending school in the Yanbu sea area. He then studied at the Hashemite High School in Madinah, and learned from the scholars of the Prophet's Mosque, such as the Tijani Muhaddith Alfa Hashim. He then worked various jobs, including administration, journalism, and education. He was appointed as an assistant inspector general at the Ministry of Finance. He also worked as editor-in-chief of Al-Bilad newspaper, Al-Nadwa, and Al-Dara magazine issued by King Abdulaziz Foundation.

== Birth and upbringing ==
Muhammad was born in Medina in 1906. His mother died when he was a child and his grandmother (Maytha'a) took care of him, and when he turned 8 years old he entered the book of Sheikh Muhammad Al-Mushi and this book is from the endowments of Al-Saqqaf in Medina. During the days of traveling Barlik, which is known as the deportation of the people during the time of Fakhri Pasha Al-Othmani, he traveled with his father to Yanbu al-Nakhl and from there to Yanbu al-Bahr. Abdul Ghani Sharaf and his colleague in this school Ibrahim Zare', Hamza Farhoud, Zaki Omar. After the situation in Medina ended, he returned to it and entered the writers Al-Qashashi and his Sheikh Hassan Saqr, and from the writers of Al-Qushashi, Al-Zaidan went to the Abdaliya School and its director, Mr. Ahmed Saqer, the teachers who were taught by Sheikh Al-Zaidan were Muhammad Saqr, Majid Eshqi, Muhammad Al-Katami, and Muhammad bin Salem. Muhammad graduated from school in 1342H and he was the fourth to graduate from it, the other three were Muhammad Iyas Tawfiq, Muhammad Niazi, and Muhammad Salem Al-Hujaili. He then continued his education in episodes of the Prophet's Mosque, and Sheikh Abdul Qadir Shalabi asked him to work with him as an assistant in the essential school that Shalabi opened until 1352H. After that he traveled to India for thirty days and when he came back he couldn't find a job, and because of Al-Zaydan's ability and efficiency, he was appointed as a teacher in the orphanage school with a salary of thirty-five riyals, and from the orphanage in Medina to the orphanage in Mecca after the orphanage in Medina was annexed to it.

== Description ==
He had a yellow skin tone, was of medium height, wide-eyed, clean-shaven, and bearded. He was thin in his youth, and when he grew older, he became closer to fullness. In the last years of his life, he became blind, and saw ghosts. His eye disease did not stop him from moving and working, as he used to dictate what he wanted to write, and he visited people. He was often accompanied by a friend of his age, Mr. Taha.

== Fame ==
Muhammad Husayn Zaydan was known as "Zorba Al-Hijaz" for his great ability to absorb history, especially Islamic history, and his abundant remembrance of the events. He was famous for being a historian, a poet, a genealogist who knew the origins and roots of people, and wise philosopher.

== Education ==
He got his education in the book just like the children of his generation at that time, then he joined the regular elementary school in Yanbu al-Bahr, after he had learned to read in the souk al-Haraj, he joined the Abdaliah School in Madinah, which was later called the High School of the Hashemite, and obtained his certificate in 1925. Finally, Al-Zaydan joined the Noble Prophet's Mosque and received knowledge at the hands of his great sheiks.

== Work ==
The jobs that he worked in:

- A teacher at the Amiri School and the orphanage.
- Secretary of the Jawa Tawafa Committee.
- Assistant Head of the Papers Department in the Ministry of Finance.
- Head of the accounts department in finance.
- Secretary of Hajj Administration.
- Head of Finance of Mecca.
- Inspector General of Hajj Administration.
- Representative of Finance at the Ministry of Interior.
- Editor-in-chief of Al-Bilad newspaper.
- Editor-in-chief of Al-Nadwa newspaper
- Editor-in-chief of Al-Dara magazine.
- Assistant to the Secretary of the Muslim World League

He also contributed and participated in many literature conferences, both internally and externally. Muhammad Husayn Zaydan worked as a teacher in the Saudi school in Medina, teaching Islamic topics in 1346H, then taught the Salafi belief in the orphanage in Madinah, then he was appointed as an assistant director and continued his teaching work until the year 1358H. Muhammad moved to Mecca where he worked as a secretary to the Sheikh of the Jawah sheiks, Sheikh Hamed Abd al-Mannan, in the second half of the fifties, then he moved to governmental work where he was a secretary for the Financial Council of the Ministry of Finance, then head of the accounting department, then head of accounting. He was later assigned as an assistant General Director of the Hajj Directorate in Makkah, then moved as Director of Makkah Finance, then Director General of Riyadh Affairs, then General Inspector of Hajj. In 1374H he left the governmental work so he could be free for journalistic work. He was the managing editor of Al-Bilad newspaper, then its editor-in-chief. He also headed the editor-in-chief of Al-Nadwa newspaper, and during his presidency of the two newspapers, he was a prominent writer in newspapers, particularly the newspapers of the Western Region. When the Muslim World League was established, Al-Zaydan served as assistant secretary-general of the League, and when the King Abdulaziz House was established in Riyadh, he was appointed as a member of the board of directors of the administration, and his cultural standing had the greatest impact on his selection for this position. Finally, he was appointed editor-in-chief of Al-Dara magazine, a magazine concerned with the kingdom's political, cultural, and urban historical monuments. Al-Zaidan, may God have mercy on him, represented Al-Dara magazine in scientific seminars and conferences.

== Written about him ==
- Al-Zaydan Zorba the Twentieth Century, Abdullah Al-Jafri, Okaz Foundation for Printing and Publishing, Jeddah, 1992.
- Biography in Saudi Literature, Abdullah Al-Haidari, Dar Tuwaiq for Publishing and Distribution, Riyadh, 1998.
- Qub Al-Mizan in the Teacher of Boys: Muhammad Husayn Zidan, Mustafa Amin Jahin, Al-Madina Press, 1993.
- Encyclopedia of Saudi Writers in Sixty Years, Ahmed Saeed bin Salim, Literary Club, Medina, 1992.

== Attachment to Medina ==
Al-Zaydan described himself as the following:

"I am an Arab [...] whether of ethnicity, or of interracial! I fight injustice and honor the guest. The sword stabs me, I rebel against justice, and injustice takes me to moderation. I am patient with hunger, and cover up satiety. Black, by luxury, I enslave. [...] Does anyone enslave me? I am enslaved by luxury [and] by lust. This is how I describe myself, as any Arab soul lives today!

== Death ==
Al-Zaydan fell ill and frequented the hospitals, and in his last days, he was overwhelmed by a depression that resented himself. He died on the morning of Saturday the 29th of Shawwal in 1412 AH.

== Radio and TV programs ==
- Kalima wa Noss, which was presented on Saudi Radio.
- Bright situations, an old program that was shown by Professor Muhammad Hussein Zaydan, during Ramadan
- The Life of the Companions: A television program that talks about the Companions, and was shown during Ramadan for many years.

== Books ==
He wrote 18 books:

- Sheiks and articles
- Lectures on culture
- Banu Hilal
- photos
- A word and a half 1981
- Winged thoughts
- Issues and articles in the Middle East
- memories
- Al-Dara Magazine Openings
- with the days
- Memories of the three eras.
- Hero biography 1967
- Europeans' Travels to Najd and Arabia 1977
- Lectures and seminars on Arab history and culture 1978
- The Ideal Approach to Writing Our History 1978
- The Islamic Conference is the Ideal Alternative to the Islamic Caliphate in 1979
- Conversations and Issues on the Middle East - Studies 1981
- Abdul Aziz and the great entity
- Arabs between Alharas and the miracle
- pen fruits
- The Evacuated 1992.

== Articles ==
- Writer's vacancy
- Reader's Notebook: The first and second parts of it have been published, and there are five parts that are prepared for printing.
