= Mahmoud Traoré =

Mahmoud Ibrahim Shuaib Traore
- Born: 1968 (age 57–58); Taif
- Education: Umm Al-Qura University
- Occupations: Writer, novelist, and journalist
- Known for: Founding the cultural section of Al-Riyadiah newspaper
- Notable work: Maimounah *Bayan Al-Ruwat fi Mawt Dima
- Awards: Abha Prize for Short Story (1992); Al-Janadriyah Festival Award (1997); Sharjah Prize for Arab Creativity (2002)

Mahmoud Ibrahim Shuaib Traore (Arabic: محمود تراوري; born 1968) is a Saudi writer, novelist, and journalist. He founded the cultural section of Al-Riyadiah newspaper and was one of the founders of Al-Watan newspaper and the Iqraa satellite channel. He has written short stories, plays, and novels, and has won local and Arab awards. Born in Taif, he earned a bachelor's degree in Media (Radio and Television) from Umm Al-Qura University in 1993.

== Career ==
Traore's extensive career in journalism began in 1983 as a contributor to several newspapers, including Al-Nadwah, Okaz, and Al-Madinah. From 1987 to 1993, he managed the Mecca office of Al-Riyadiah newspaper. He later worked full-time for the Saudi Research and Publishing Company from 1993 to 1998. In addition to his leadership role at Al-Watan newspaper as the head of the cultural section, he also played a key part in founding both the newspaper and the Iqraa satellite channel.

Beyond his work in media, Traore is a prolific writer whose short stories, plays, and novels have been published in Saudi and other Arab periodicals. He has also prepared and written programs for Saudi Television and, since 2007, has been the host and producer of the radio show "Cultural Cafe" on Jeddah Radio. His contributions to the arts also include his involvement in cultural, social, and theatrical activities at the Al-Wehda Club from 1985 to 1988.

== Literary Works ==
Mahmoud Traore is a prolific author of short stories and novels. His published works include:

- Bayan Al-Ruwat fi Mawt Dima (Narrators' Statement on the Death of Dima): A collection of short stories published by the Taif Literary Club in 1993.
- Rish Al-Hamam (Pigeon Feathers): A collection of short stories published by Dar Sharqiyat in Cairo in 1997.
- Maimounah: A novel that has been published in three editions (Sharjah 2002, Cairo, and Damascus 2007).
- Akhdar Ya Oud Al-Qana (Green, Oh Reed of the Channel): A novel published in 2010.
- Jiran Zamzam (Neighbors of Zamzam): A novel published in 2013.
- Nida'at Al-Aziqah Al-Akhira (The Last Alleys' Calls): A collection of short stories published in 2014.

Traore also has two unpublished, handwritten novels titled Zeeq Al-Hala and Joush Al-Masra.

== Awards ==
Mahmoud Traore has received several prestigious awards for his literary work:

- Abha Prize for Short Story (1992): Awarded for his short story collection, Bayan Al-Ruwat fi Mawt Dima.
- Al-Janadriyah Festival Award for Distinguished Playwright (1997): Received for his play, Mutaabaq Maleh.
- Second Place, Sharjah Prize for Arab Creativity (2002): Awarded for his novel, Maimounah.
