= Zidan =

Zidan or more formally Zaydan is a given name and family name in various cultures. As an Arabic name (زيدان) it is also romanised as Zidane or Zeidan. As a Chinese given name, it can be written in various ways (e.g. 子丹), with different meanings depending on the component Chinese characters.

People with the patronymic or family name Zidan include:

- Al Walid ben Zidan (died 1636), sultan of Morocco
- Gregor Židan (born 1965), Slovenian football player
- Mohamed Zidan (born 1981), Egyptian football player
- Mohamed Salah al-Din al-Halim Zaidan (born 1960 or 1963), Islamic militant
- Raed Zidan (born 1971), first Palestinian mountaineer to summit Mount Everest
- Ibrahim Mahdy Achmed Zeidan, Libyan man detained at Guantanamo Bay from 2002 to 2007

People with the given name Zidan include:

- Zaydan An-Nasser (died 1627), sultan of Morocco
- Cao Zhen (died 231), style name Zidan, military general under Cao Cao
- Donnie Yen (Zhen Zidan, born 1965), Hong Kong actor
- Zidan Saif (c. 1974 – 2004), Israeli Druze policeman killed in the 2014 Jerusalem synagogue massacre
- Zeydan Karalar (born 1958), mayor of Adana

== See also ==
- Zayd (name), also spelled Zaydan
- Zidane (name)
- Zidani (disambiguation)
