= Zeidan =

Zeidan (Arabic: زيدان) may refer to

- Zeidan (name)
- Tell Zeidan, an archaeological site in northern Syria
- Salwa Zeidan Gallery, a contemporary art gallery in United Arab Emirates

== See also ==
- Zaydan
