= Zidani =

Zidani may refer to:

- Amina Zidani (born 1993), French boxer
- Marcel Zidani, British pianist and composer
- Zidani clan, Arab family that ruled Palestine in the 18th century
- Zidani Most, a Slovenian village of the municipality of Laško
  - Zidani Most railway station
- Zidani Most, Trebnje, a Slovenian village of the municipality of Trebnje
- Zaydan, a name of Arab origin, meaning increase (z.y.d root)

== See also ==
- Zidan (disambiguation)
- Zidane (name), disambiguation page
