= Climate of Mecca =

Coordinates: 21°25′0″N 39°49′0″E

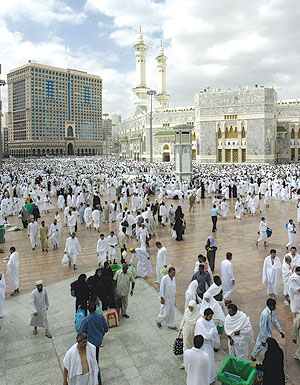
Cumulus humilis cloud over Makkah city

Mecca features a hot desert climate. Mecca retains its hot temperature in winter, which can range from 18 °C (64 °F) at night to 30 °C (86 °F) in the day. Summer temperatures are extremely hot, often being over 40 °C (104 °F) during the day, dropping to 30 °C (86 °F) at night. Rain usually falls in Makkah in small amounts between November and January. The rainfall, as scant as it is, also presents the threat of flooding and has been a danger since the earliest times. According to Al-Kurdī, there had been 89 historic floods by 1965, including several in the period. In the last century the most severe one occurred in 1941. Since then, dams have been constructed to ameliorate the problem.

Climate data for Makkah
Month	Jan	Feb	Mar	Apr	May	Jun	Jul	Aug	Sep	Oct	Nov	Dec	Year
Record high °C (°F)	37.8 (100.0)	38.3 (100.9)	42.4 (108.3)	44.7 (112.5)	49.4 (120.9)	51.8 (125.2)	51.0 (123.8)	49.7 (121.5)	49.4 (120.9)	47.0 (116.6)	41.2 (106.2)	39.4 (102.9)	51.8 (125.2)
Mean daily maximum °C (°F)	30.5 (86.9)	31.7 (89.1)	34.9 (94.8)	38.7 (101.7)	42.0 (107.6)	43.8 (110.8)	43.0 (109.4)	42.8 (109.0)	42.8 (109.0)	40.1 (104.2)	35.2 (95.4)	32.0 (89.6)	38.1 (100.6)
Daily mean °C (°F)	24.0 (75.2)	24.7 (76.5)	27.3 (81.1)	31.0 (87.8)	34.3 (93.7)	35.8 (96.4)	35.9 (96.6)	35.7 (96.3)	35.0 (95.0)	32.2 (90.0)	28.4 (83.1)	25.6 (78.1)	30.8 (87.5)
Mean daily minimum °C (°F)	18.8 (65.8)	19.1 (66.4)	21.1 (70.0)	24.5 (76.1)	27.6 (81.7)	28.6 (83.5)	29.1 (84.4)	29.5 (85.1)	28.9 (84.0)	25.9 (78.6)	23.0 (73.4)	20.3 (68.5)	24.7 (76.5)
Record low °C (°F)	11.0 (51.8)	10.0 (50.0)	13.0 (55.4)	15.6 (60.1)	20.3 (68.5)	22.0 (71.6)	23.4 (74.1)	23.4 (74.1)	22.0 (71.6)	18.0 (64.4)	16.4 (61.5)	12.4 (54.3)	10.0 (50.0)
Average precipitation mm (inches)	20.8 (0.82)	3.0 (0.12)	5.5 (0.22)	10.3 (0.41)	1.2 (0.05)	0.0 (0.0)	1.4 (0.06)	5.0 (0.20)	5.4 (0.21)	14.5 (0.57)	22.6 (0.89)	22.1 (0.87)	111.8 (4.42)
Average precipitation days	4.0	0.9	1.8	1.8	0.7	0.0	0.3	1.5	2.0	1.9	3.9	3.6	22.4
Average relative humidity (%)	58	54	48	43	36	33	34	39	45	50	58	59	46
Mean daily sunshine hours	8.4	8.7	9.1	9.4	9.8	10.7	10.1	9.6	9.4	9.7	8.8	8.0	9.3
Percentage possible sunshine	76	80	76	72	75	82	78	74	78	81	80	73	77
Source 1: Jeddah Regional Climate Center
Source 2: Deutscher Wetterdienst (sun, 1986–2000)

Climate data for Mecca
Month	Jan	Feb	Mar	Apr	May	Jun	Jul	Aug	Sep	Oct	Nov	Dec	Year
Mean daily daylight hours	11.0	11.5	12.0	12.6	13.2	13.4	13.3	12.8	12.3	11.7	11.1	10.9	12.1
Average Ultraviolet index	7	9	12	12	12	12	12	12	12	10	8	7	9.8
Source: Weather Atlas

== Factors ==
Mecca is at an elevation of 277 m above sea level, and approximately 80 km inland from the Red Sea. Flash floods are common during winter season even though the amount of precipitation is low. Since Mecca is located in a desert, dust storms are common in the city.

- Shamal winds occur in Mecca mostly during summer months, these Shamal winds are very dusty and remain at peak in the morning but decreases at night. These winds also occur in winter but not often.
- Sandstorms and Dust storms both affect Mecca almost every month but especially during summer months.
- Westerly winds bring thunderstorms to Mecca during winter and hailstorms sometimes also occur.

== Extreme weather events ==
Since Mecca is located in a low-lying region, it is threatened by seasonal flash floods despite the low amount of annual precipitation. There are less than 110 millimetres (4.3 in) of rainfall during the year, mainly falling in the winter months. Temperatures are high throughout the year and in summer it may reach 45 °C (113 °F). The following are extreme weather events in Mecca and the surrounding area.

- In November 2009, Makkah Province was badly affected when record-breaking rainfall of 90 millimetres (3.5 in) hit the province causing flash floods all over the province. It was the worst flood in 27 years.
- In November 2010, a thunderstorm killed 3 people in Makkah city following heavy rainfall. Most of the city remained under flood warning the entire night.
- In December 2010, once again the city was flooded when light to moderate intensity rainfall battered the holy city, claiming the lives of 4 people. While condition in Makkah Province was also comparable to the provincial capital.
- In January 2011, heavy rainfall created flood like situation in the provinces especially Jeddah where 111 millimetres (4.4 in) occurred in just 3 hours killing four people.
- On May 8, 2014 rainfall of more than 50mm created flood like situation with extreme lightning.
