= Zidane (name) =

Zidane most commonly refers to the name of Arab origin, Zaydān, meaning increase (ز ي د, z-y-d).

Zidane may also refer to:

- Djamel Zidane (born 1955), Algerian footballer
- Elyaz Zidane (born 2005), French footballer, son of Zinedine
- Enzo Zidane (born 1995), French footballer, son of Zinedine
- Zidane Iqbal (born 2003), Iraqi footballer
- Luca Zidane (born 1998), Algerian footballer, son of Zinedine
- Mohammed Salahaldin Abd El Halim Zidane (born 1960 or 1963), Islamic militant
- Mohamed Amine Zidane (born 1983), Algerian footballer
- Mohamed Zidan (born 1981), Egyptian footballer
- Mohamed Zidan (rower) (born 1978), Egyptian rower
- Théo Zidane (born 2002), French footballer, son of Zinedine
- Youssef Ziedan (born 1958), Egyptian scholar
- Zidane Tribal, the main protagonist of the video game Final Fantasy IX
- Zinedine Zidane (born 1972), French footballer and manager
  - Zidane: A 21st Century Portrait, a documentary about him
  - "Zinedine Zidane", a song by Australian band Vaudeville Smash

== See also ==
- Zidan (disambiguation)
- Zidani (disambiguation)
