= Zeidan (name) =

Zeidan or Zeidane (Arabic: زيدان) is an masculine given name and surname of Arabic origin. Notable people with the name include:

== Given name ==
- Zeidan Atashi (born 1940), Israeli Druze former diplomat and politician
- Zeidane Ould Hmeida (born 1955), Mauritanian politician
- Zeidane Inoussa (born 2002), Swedish footballer
- Zeidan Kafafi, Jordanian archaeologist and academic

== Surname ==
- Ali Zeidan (born 1950), Prime Minister of Libya
- Ayman Zeidan (born 1956), Syrian actor, TV host
- Moustafa Zeidan (born 1998), Swedish football player
- Rima Zeidan (born 1990), Taiwanese-Lebanese presenter, model and actress
- Salwa Zeidan, Lebanese artist, sculptor, and curator.

== See also ==
- Zaydan
