= Mecca =

Holiest city in Islam and capital of Mecca Province, Saudi Arabia

Mecca مكة
- City
- Makkah al-Mukarramah مكة المكرمة
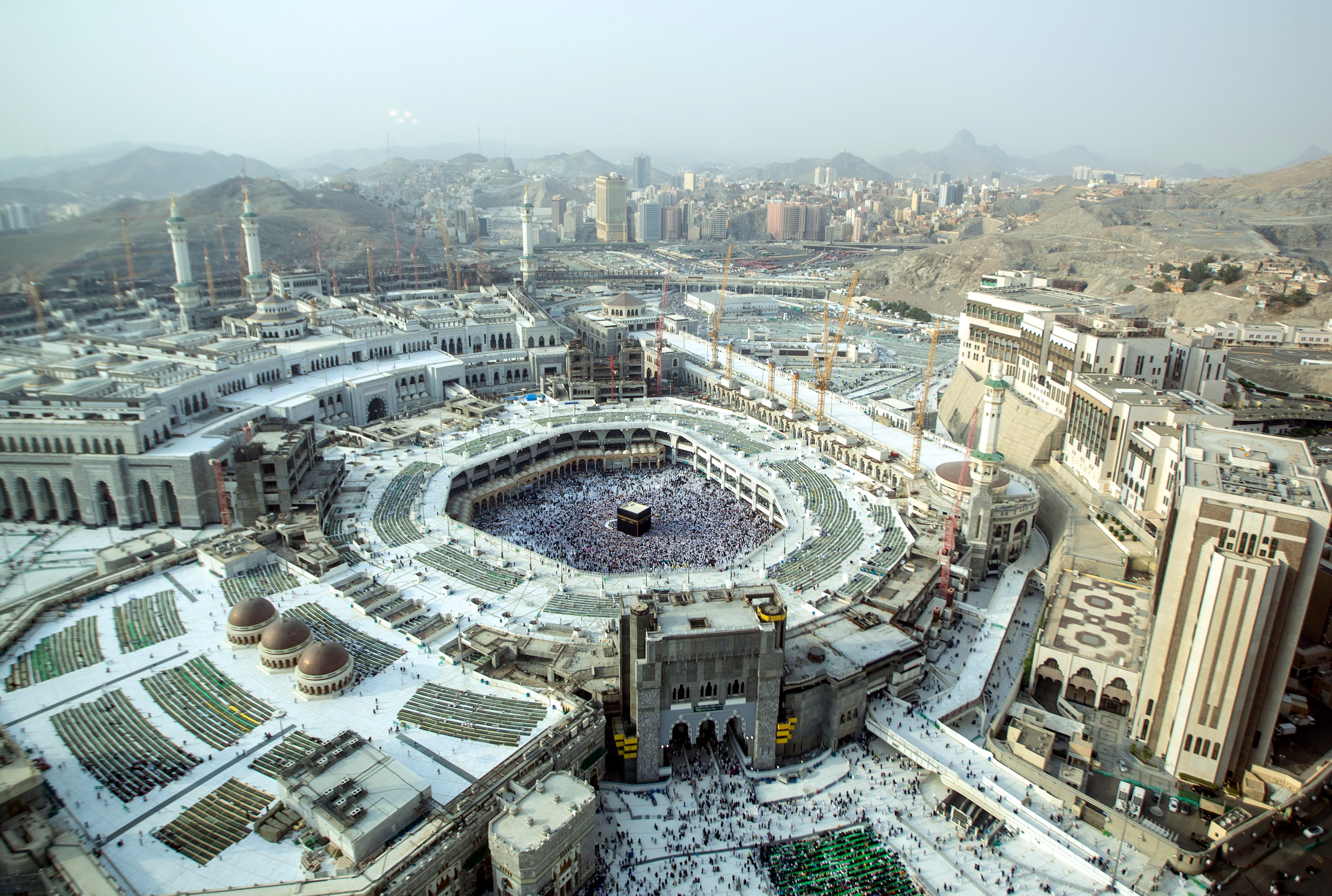
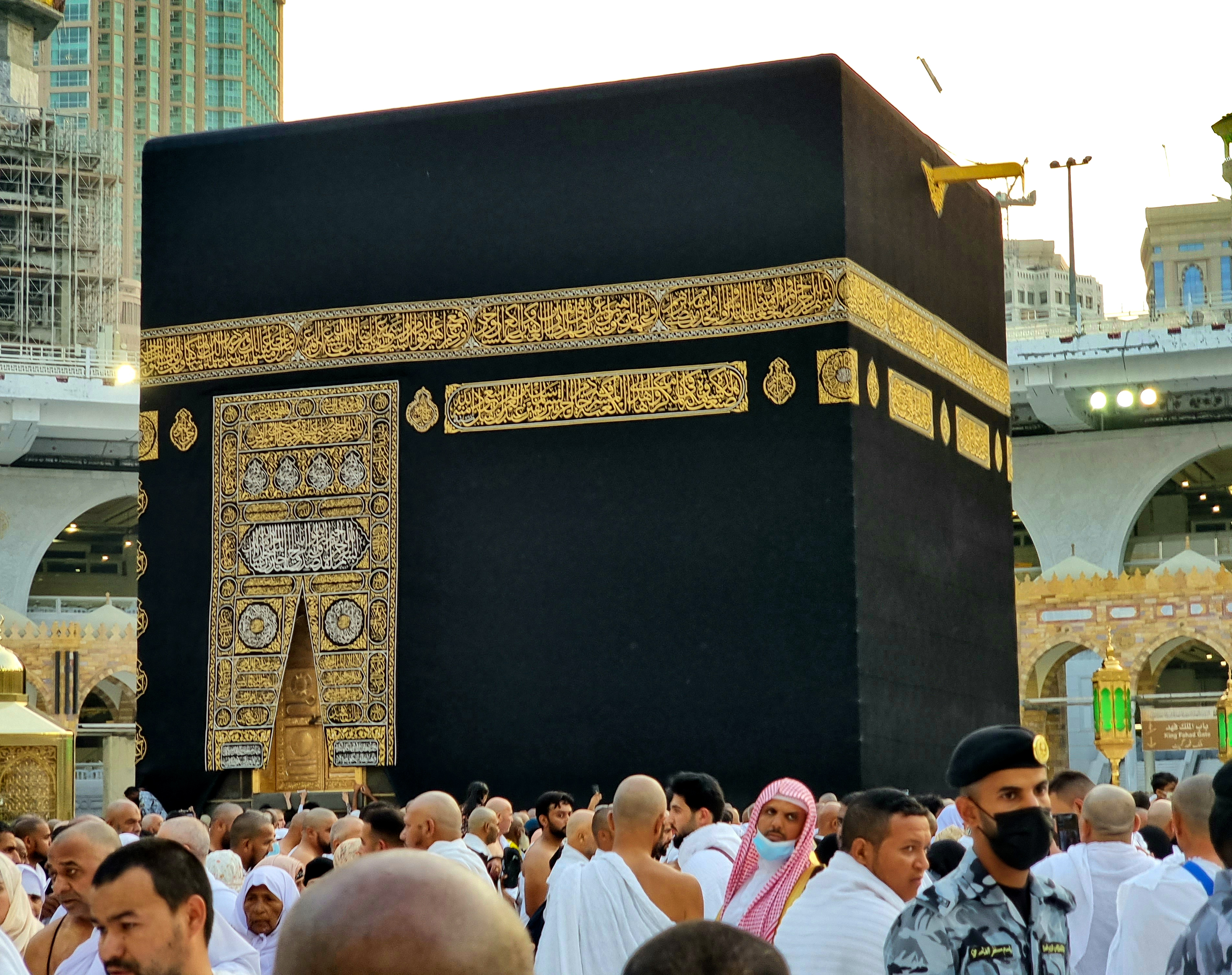
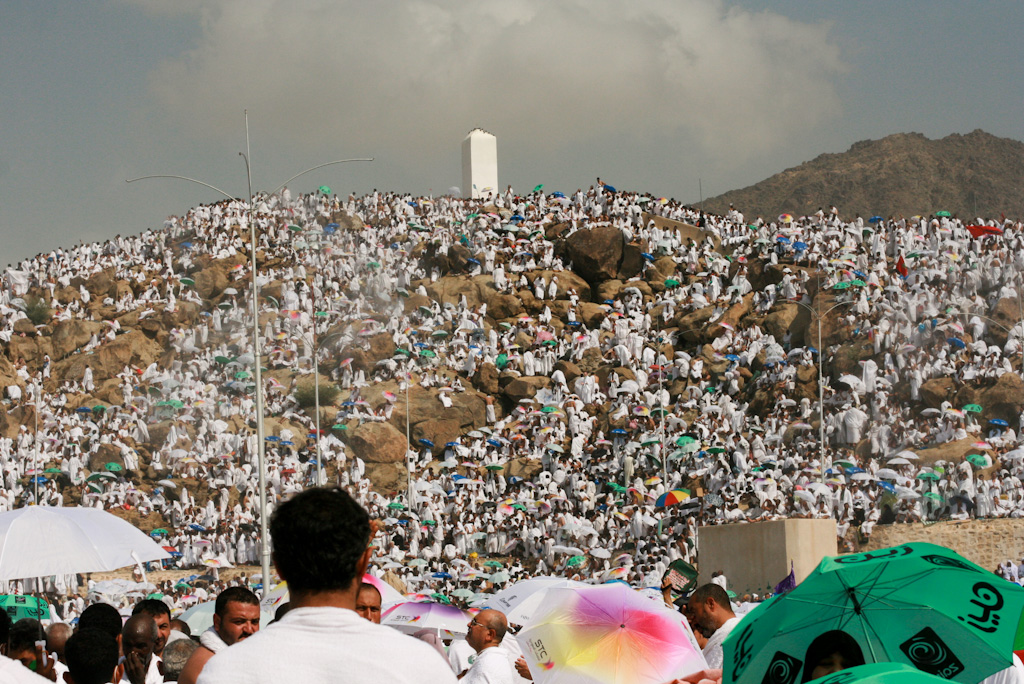
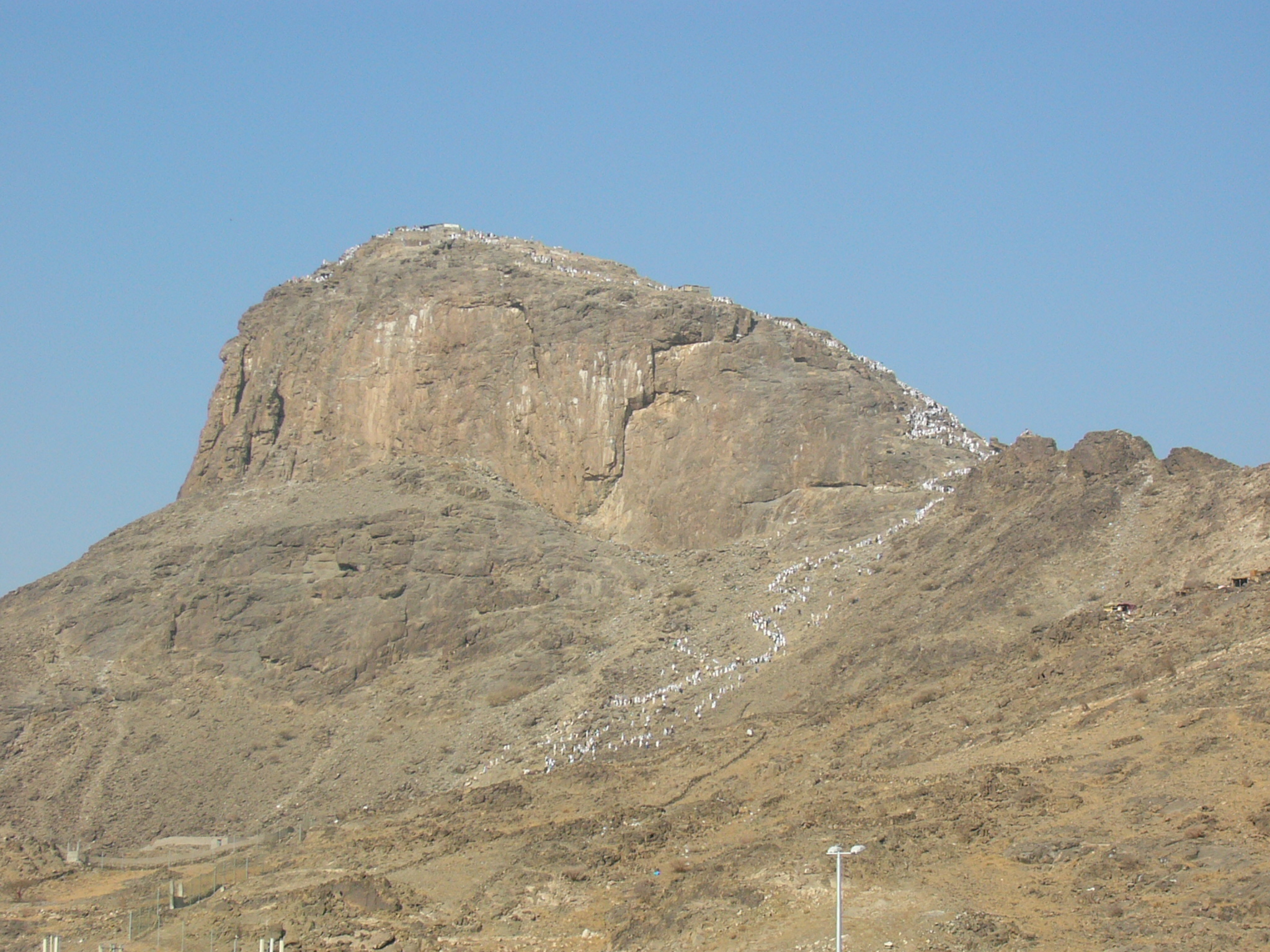
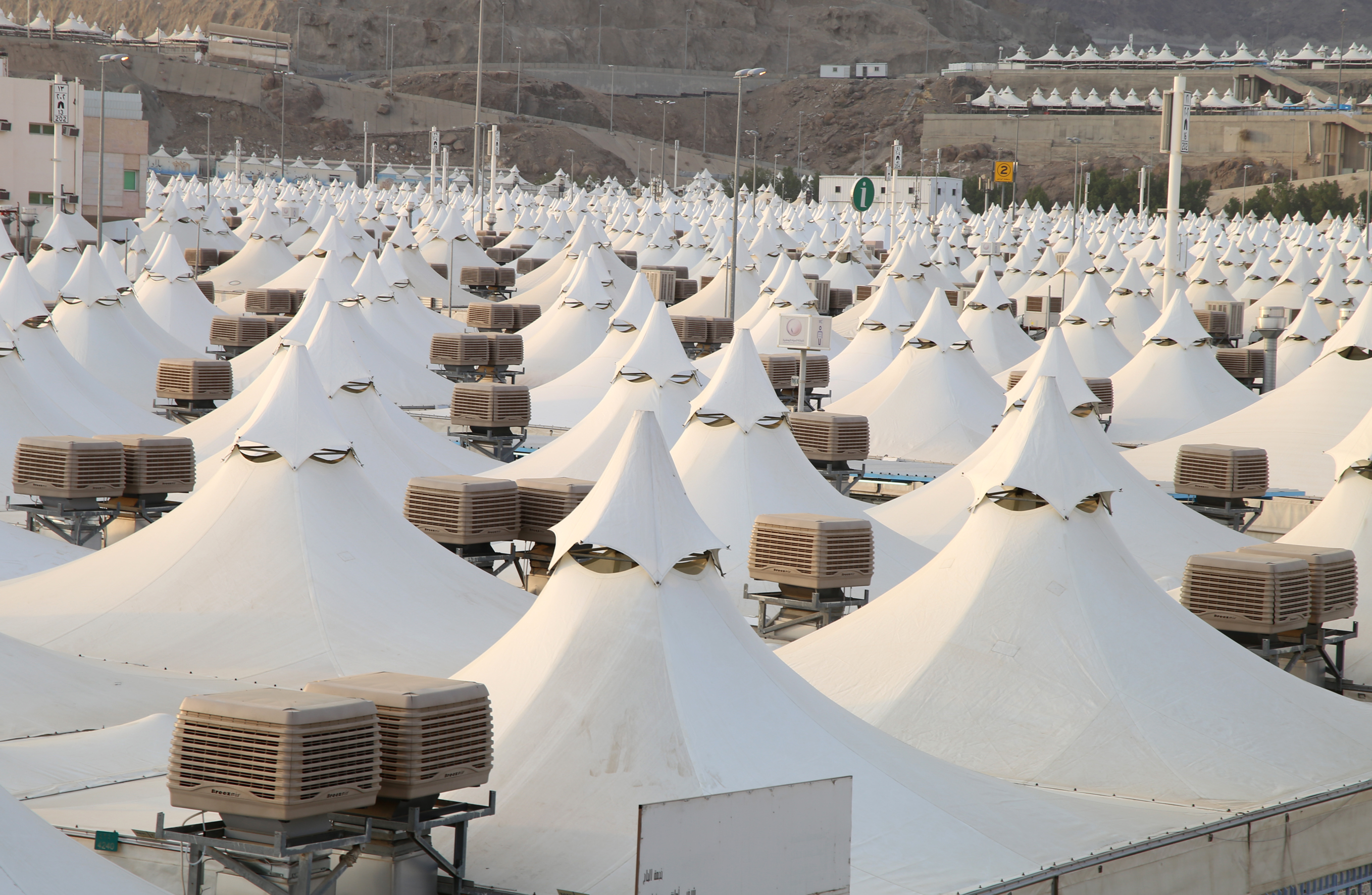
- Great Mosque of Mecca The Kaaba Mount Arafat Jabal al-Nour Mina tents

- Location of Mecca in Saudi Arabia Mecca (West and Central Asia) Mecca (Middle East)
- Coordinates: 21°25′21″N 39°49′24″E
- Country: Saudi Arabia
- Province: Mecca Province
- Governorate: Holy Capital Governorate
- Region: Hejaz
- Founder: Ibrāhīm and Ismāʿīl (traditionally believed to have built The Kaaba)

Government
  - Body: Mecca City Royal Commission (Upper body); Holy Mecca Municipality (Lower body)
  - Mayor: Saleh Al-Turki
  - Provincial Governor: Khalid Al-Faisal

Area
  - City: 1,200 km^{2} (460 sq mi)
  - Land: 760 km^{2} (290 sq mi)
- Elevation: 277 m (909 ft)

Population (2022 census)
  - City: 2,385,509
  - Rank: 3rd in Saudi Arabia
  - Density: 3,100/km^{2} (8,100/sq mi)
  - Metro: 2,427,924 (Mecca Governorate)
- Demonym(s): Meccan, Makki (مكي)

GDP (PPP, constant 2015 values)
  - Year: 2023
  - Total (Metro): $84.6 billion
  - Per capita: $39,400
- Time zone: UTC+03:00 (SAST)
- Area code: +966-12
- Website: hmm.gov.sa

Mecca, (Note: /ˈmɛkə/; Arabic: مَكَّة, Arabic pronunciation: [mak.ka]) officially Makkah al-Mukarramah, (Note: Arabic: مَكَّة ٱلْمُكَرَّمَة, lit. 'Makkah the Noble', Arabic pronunciation: [mak.ka almʊkarːama]) is a city in the Hejaz region of western Saudi Arabia and is the capital of Mecca Province. Mecca is considered the birthplace of Islam and the Islamic prophet Muhammad, as well as being the holiest city in Islam.

It is located 70 km (43 mi) inland from Jeddah on the Red Sea in a narrow valley 277 m (909 ft) above sea level. Its metropolitan population in 2022 was 2.4 million, making it the third most populated city in Saudi Arabia after Riyadh and Jeddah. The Cave of Hira atop the Jabal al-Nour just outside the city is where Muslims believe the Quran was first revealed to Muhammad. The Great Mosque of Mecca, known as the Masjid al-Haram, is home to the Kaaba, believed by Muslims to have been built by Abraham and Ishmael. It is the direction of prayer (qibla) for all Muslims worldwide. Around 44.5% of the population are Saudi citizens and around 55.5% are Muslim foreigners from other countries. Pilgrims more than triple the population number every year during the Ḥajj pilgrimage, observed in the twelfth Hijri month of Dhūl-Ḥijjah as an obligation for all Muslims at least once in their lives. With over 19.3 million international visitors in 2024, Mecca was one of the five most visited cities in the world.

Muslim rulers from in and around the region long tried to rule the city, and thus, much like most of the Hejazi region, has seen several regime changes. The city was most recently conquered in the Saudi conquest of Hejaz by Ibn Saud and his allies in 1925. Since then, Mecca has seen a tremendous expansion in size and infrastructure, with newer, modern buildings such as The Clock Towers, the world's fourth–tallest building and fifth–largest by floor area, towering over the Great Mosque. The Saudi government has also carried out the destruction of several historical structures and archaeological sites, such as the Ajyad Fortress. However, many of the demolitions have officially been part of the continued expansion of the Masjid al-Haram at Mecca and the Prophet's Mosque in Medina and their auxiliary service facilities in order to accommodate the ever-increasing number of Muslims performing the pilgrimage. Non-Muslims are prohibited from entering the city.

Under the Saudi government, Mecca is governed by the Mecca Regional Municipality, a municipal council of 14 locally elected members headed by the mayor (called Amin in Arabic) appointed by the Saudi government. As of January 2022, the mayor of the city is Saleh Al-Turki. The City of Mecca amanah, which constitutes Mecca and the surrounding region, is the capital of the Mecca Province, which includes the neighbouring cities of Jeddah and Taif, even though Jeddah is considerably larger in population than Mecca. Prince Khalid Al-Faisal has been the provincial governor since 16 May 2007.

== Etymology ==
Mecca has been referred to by many names. Its etymology is obscure as with many Arabic words. Widely believed to be a synonym for Makkah, it is said to be more specifically the early name for the valley located therein. At the same time, Muslim scholars generally use it to refer to the sacred area of the city that immediately surrounds and includes the Kaaba.

Makkah is the official transliteration used by the Saudi government and is closer to the Arabic pronunciation. The government adopted Makkah as the official spelling in the 1980s, but it is not universally known or used worldwide. The full official name is Makkah al-Mukarramah (Arabic: مكة المكرمة, lit. 'Makkah the Honored'). Makkah is used to refer to the city in the Quran in Surah Al-Fath (48), verse 24.

The word Mecca in English has come to be used to refer to any place that draws large numbers of people, and because of this some English-speaking Muslims have come to regard the use of this spelling for the city as offensive. Nonetheless, Mecca is the familiar form of the English transliteration for the Arabic name of the city.

Macoraba, another ancient city name Claudius Ptolemy says was within Arabia Felix, was also claimed to be Mecca. Some studies have questioned this association. Many etymologies have been proposed: the traditional one is that it is derived from the Old South Arabian root M-K-R-B which means "temple."

=== Other names ===
Another name used for Mecca in the Quran is at 6:92 where it is called Umm al-Qurā (أُمّ ٱلْقُرَى, meaning "Mother of all Settlements"). The city has been called several other names in both the Quran and ahadith. Another name used historically for Mecca is Tihāmah. According to an Islamic suggestion, another name for Mecca, Fārān, is synonymous with the Desert of Paran mentioned in the Hebrew Bible at Genesis 21:21. Arab and Islamic tradition holds that the wilderness of Paran, broadly speaking, is the Tihamah coastal plain and the site where Ishmael settled was Mecca. Yaqut al-Hamawi, the 12th-century Syrian geographer, wrote that Fārān was "an Arabized Hebrew word, one of the names of Mecca mentioned in the Torah."

==== Bakkah ====
The Quran refers to the city as Bakkah in Surah Al Imran (3), verse 96: "Indeed the first House [of worship], established for mankind was that at Bakkah." This is said to have been the name of the city at the time of Ibrahim and it is also transliterated as Baca, Baka, Bakah, Bakka, Becca and Bekka, among others. It was a name for the city in the ancient world.

== History ==
=== Prehistory ===
In 2010, Mecca and the surrounding area became an important site for paleontology with respect to primate evolution, with the discovery of a Saadanius fossil. Saadanius is considered to be a primate closely related to the common ancestor of the Old World monkeys and apes. The fossil habitat, near what is now the Red Sea in western Saudi Arabia, was a damp forest area between 28 million and 29 million years ago. Paleontologists involved in the research hope to find further fossils in the area.

=== Early history (up to 6th century CE) ===
The early history of Mecca is still largely shrouded by a lack of clear sources. The city lies in the hinterland of the middle part of western Arabia of which there are sparse textual or archaeological sources available. This lack of knowledge is in contrast to both the northern and southern areas of western Arabia, specifically the Syro-Palestinian frontier and Yemen, where historians have various sources available such as physical remains of shrines, inscriptions, observations by Greco-Roman authors, and information collected by church historians. The area of the Hejaz that surrounds Mecca was characterized by its remote, rocky, and inhospitable nature, supporting only meagre settled populations in scattered oases and occasional stretches of fertile land. The Red Sea coast offered no easily accessible ports and the oasis dwellers and bedouins in the region were illiterate.

One study by Majied Robinson, based on early Islamic genealogical records, estimates that at the time of Muhammad the population of Mecca was around 550. Muslim scholars using traditional sources may place the number as high as 10,000.

The first clear reference to Mecca in non-Islamic literature appears in 741, long after the death of Muhammad, in the Byzantine-Arab Chronicle or Chronicle of 741. However, English writer Tom Holland claims that here the author places the region in Mesopotamia rather than the Hejaz.

Possible earlier mentions are ambiguous. The Greek historian Diodorus Siculus writes about Arabia in the 1st century BCE in his work Bibliotheca Historica, describing a holy shrine: "And a temple has been set up there, which is very holy and exceedingly revered by all Arabians." Claims have been made this could be a reference to the Kaaba in Mecca. However, the geographic location Diodorus describes is located in northwest Arabia, around the area of Leuke Kome, within the former Nabataean Kingdom and the Roman province of Arabia Petraea.

Ptolemy lists the names of 50 cities in Arabia, one going by the name of Macoraba. There has been speculation since 1646 that this could be a reference to Mecca. Historically, there has been a general consensus in scholarship that Macoraba mentioned by Ptolemy in the 2nd century CE is indeed Mecca, but more recently, this has been questioned. Historian Glen Bowersock favors the identity of the former, with his theory being that "Macoraba" is the word "Makkah" followed by the aggrandizing Aramaic adjective rabb (great). The Roman 4th-century historian Ammianus Marcellinus also enumerated many cities of Western Arabia, most of which can be identified. According to Bowersock, he did mention Mecca as "Geapolis" or "Hierapolis," the latter one meaning "holy city" potentially referring to the sanctuary of the Kaaba. Danish writer Patricia Crone, from the Revisionist school of Islamic studies on the other hand, writes that "the plain truth is that the name Macoraba has nothing to do with that of Mecca [...] if Ptolemy mentions Mecca at all, he calls it Moka, a town in Arabia Petraea."

Procopius' 6th century statement that the Ma'add tribe possessed the coast of western Arabia between the Ghassanids and the Himyarites of the south supports the Arabic sources tradition that associates Quraysh as a branch of the Ma'add and Muhammad as a direct descendant of Ma'add ibn Adnan.

Patricia Crone and Tom Holland has cast doubt on the claim that Mecca was a major historical trading outpost. However, other scholars such as Glen W. Bowersock disagree and assert that Mecca was a major trading outpost. Crone later on disregarded some of her theories. She argues that Meccan trade relied on skins, hides, manufactured leather goods, clarified butter, Hijazi woollens, and camels. She suggests that most of these goods were destined for the Roman army, which is known to have required colossal quantities of leather and hides for its equipment. The earliest Muslim inscriptions are from the Mecca–Taif area.

Islamic narrative

In the Islamic view, the beginnings of Mecca are attributed to the Biblical figures, Adam, Abraham, Hagar and Ishmael. It was Adam himself who built the first God's house in Mecca according to a heavenly prototype but this building was destroyed in the Noahic Flood. The civilization of Mecca is believed to have started after Ibrāhīm (Abraham) left his son Ismāʿīl (Ishmael) and wife Hājar (Hagar) in the valley at Allah's command. Some people from the Yemeni tribe of Jurhum settled with them, and Isma'il reportedly married two women, one after divorcing the first, on Ibrahim's advice. At least one man of the Jurhum helped Ismāʿīl and his father to construct or according to Islamic narratives, reconstruct, the Kaaba ('Cube'), which would have social, religious, political and historical implications for the site and region.

Muslims see the mention of a pilgrimage at the Valley of the Bakha in the Old Testament chapter Psalm 84:3–6 as a reference to Mecca, similar to the Quran at Surah 3:96 In the 'āl ʿimrān, a commentary on the Samaritan midrashic chronology of the Patriarchs, of unknown date but probably composed in the 10th century CE, it is claimed that Mecca was built by the sons of Nebaioth, the eldest son of Ismāʿīl or Ishmael.

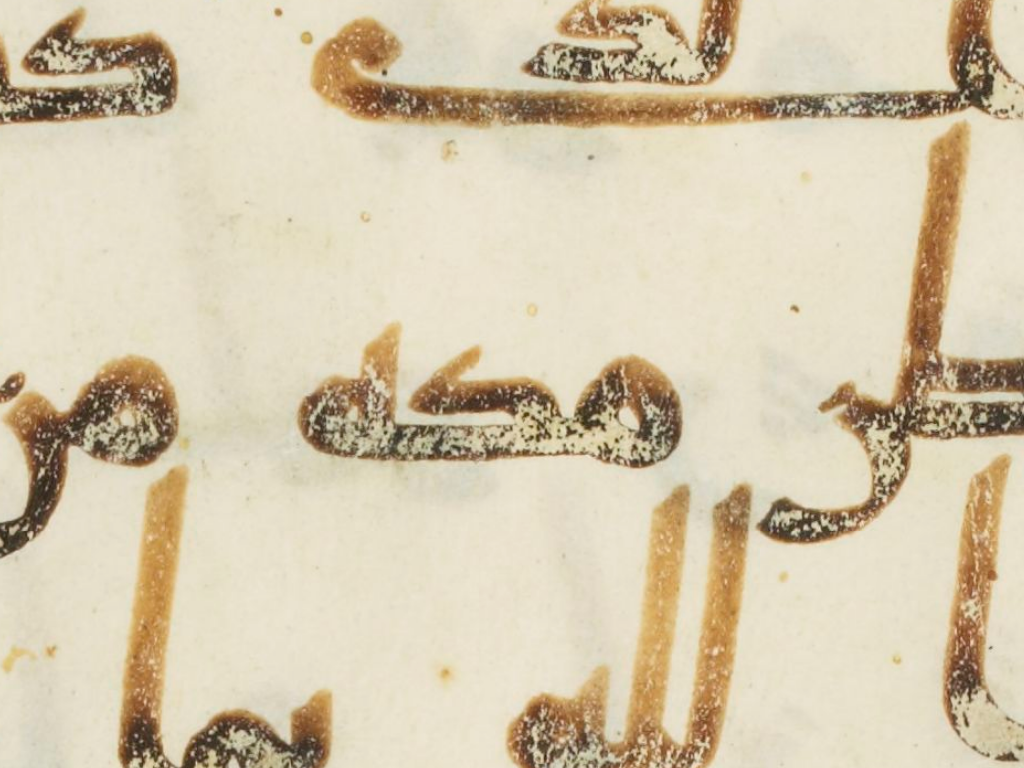
Mecca mentioned in Quranic manuscript Codex Arabe 331 (Q48:24)

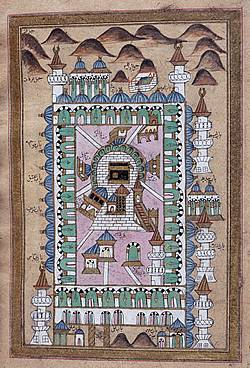
A 1787 Ottoman Turkish map of Masjid al-Haram, and related religious sites, such as Jabal al-Nour

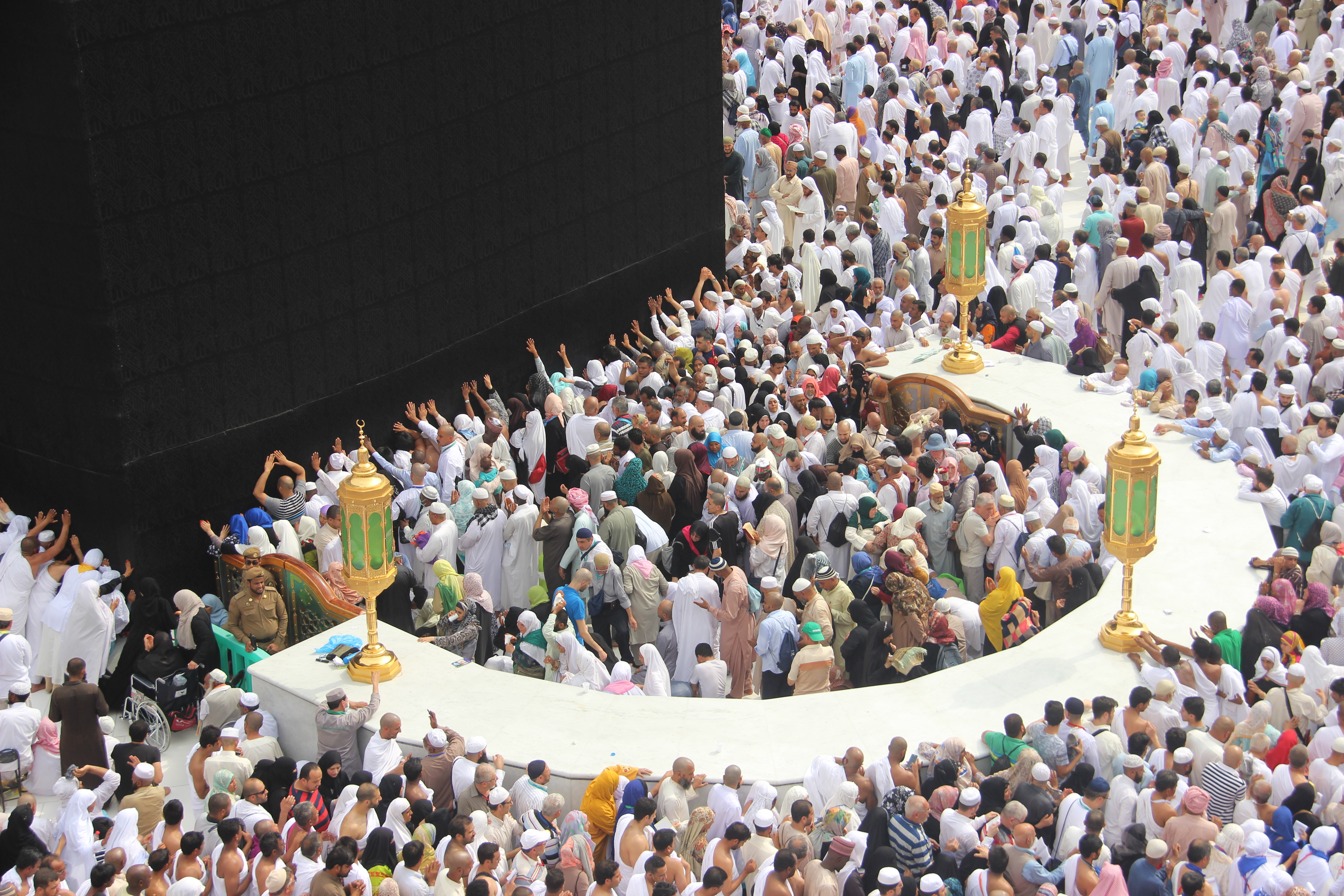
The Hateem near the Kaaba where Muslims believe that Isma'il (Ishmael) and Hajar (Hagar) dwelt

==== Under the Quraysh ====
Sometime in the 5th century, the Ka'bah was a place of worship for the deities of Arabia's pagan tribes. Mecca's most important pagan deity was Hubal, which had been placed there by the ruling Quraysh tribe, and remained until the Conquest of Mecca by Muhammad. In the 5th century, the Quraish took control of Mecca, and became skilled merchants and traders. In the 6th century, they joined the lucrative spice trade, since battles elsewhere were diverting trade routes from dangerous sea routes to more secure overland routes. The Byzantine Empire had previously controlled the Red Sea, but piracy had been increasing. Another previous route that ran through the Persian Gulf via the Tigris and Euphrates rivers was also being threatened by exploitations from the Sasanian Empire, and was being disrupted by the Lakhmid kingdom, the Ghassanids, and the Roman–Persian wars. Mecca's prominence as a trading center also surpassed the cities of Petra and Palmyra. The Sassanids however did not always pose a threat to Mecca, as in 575 they protected it from a Yemeni invasion, led by its Christian leader Abraha. The tribes of southern Arabia asked the Persian king Khosrow I for aid, in response to which he came south to Arabia with foot-soldiers and a fleet of ships near Mecca.

By the middle of the 6th century, there were three major settlements in northern Arabia, all along the south-western coast that borders the Red Sea, in a habitable region between the sea and the Hejaz mountains to the east. Although the area around Mecca was completely barren, it was the wealthiest of the three settlements with abundant water from the renowned Zamzam Well and a position at the crossroads of major caravan routes.

The harsh conditions and terrain of the Arabian peninsula meant a near-constant state of conflict between the local tribes, but once a year they would declare a truce and converge upon Mecca in an annual pilgrimage. Up to the 7th century, this journey was intended for religious reasons by the pagan Arabs to pay homage to their shrine, and to drink Zamzam. However, it was also the time each year that disputes would be arbitrated, debts would be resolved, and trading would occur at Meccan fairs. These annual events gave the tribes a sense of common identity and made Mecca an important focus for the peninsula.

==== Year of the Elephant (570) ====
The "Year of the Elephant" is the name in Islamic history for the year approximately equating to 570–572, when, according to Islamic sources such as Ibn Ishaq, Abraha descended upon Mecca, riding an elephant, with a large army after building a cathedral at San'aa, named al-Qullays in honor of the Negus of Axum. It gained widespread fame, even gaining attention from the Byzantine Empire. Abraha attempted to divert the pilgrimage of the Arabs from the Ka'bah to al-Qullays, effectively converting them to Christianity. According to Islamic tradition, this was the year of Muhammad's birth. Abraha allegedly sent a messenger named Muhammad ibn Khuza'i to Mecca and Tihamah with a message that al-Qullays was both much better than other houses of worship and purer, having not been defiled by the housing of idols. When Muhammad ibn Khuza'i got as far as the land of Banu Kinana, the people of the lowland, knowing what he had come for, sent a man of Hudhayl called ʿUrwa bin Hayyad al-Milasi, who shot him with an arrow, killing him. His brother Qays who was with him, fled to Abraha and told him the news, which increased his rage and fury and he swore to raid the Kinana tribe and destroy the Ka'bah. Ibn Ishaq further states that one of the men of the Quraysh tribe was angered by this, and going to Sana'a, entering the church at night and defiling it; widely assumed to have done so by defecating in it.

Abraha marched upon the Kaaba with a large army, which included one or more war elephants, intending to demolish it. When news of the advance of his army came, the Arab tribes of Quraysh, Kinanah, Banu Khuza'ah and Hudhayl united in the defense of the Kaaba and the city. A man from the Himyarite Kingdom was sent by Abraha to advise them that Abraha only wished to demolish the Ka'bah and if they resisted, they would be crushed. Abd al-Muttalib told the Meccans to seek refuge in the hills while he and some members of the Quraysh remained within the precincts of the Kaaba. Abraha sent a dispatch inviting Abdul-Muttalib to meet with Abraha and discuss matters. When Abdul-Muttalib left the meeting he was heard saying: "The Owner of this House is its Defender, and I am sure he will save it from the attack of the adversaries and will not dishonor the servants of His House."

Abraha eventually attacked Mecca. However, the lead elephant, known as Mahmud, is said to have stopped at the boundary around Mecca and refused to enter. It has been theorized that an epidemic such as by smallpox could have caused such a failed invasion of Mecca. The reference to the story in Quran is rather short. According to the 105th Surah of the Quran, Al-Fil, the next day, a dark cloud of small birds sent by Allah appeared. The birds carried small rocks in their beaks, and bombarded the Ethiopian forces, and smashed them to a state like that of eaten straw.

==== Economy ====
Camel caravans, said to have first been used by Muhammad's great-grandfather, were a major part of Mecca's bustling economy. Alliances were struck between the merchants in Mecca and the local nomadic tribes, who would bring goods – leather, livestock, and metals mined in the local mountains – to Mecca to be loaded on the caravans and carried to cities in Shaam and Iraq. Historical accounts also provide some indication that goods from other continents may also have flowed through Mecca. Goods from Africa and the Far East passed through en route to Syria including spices, leather, medicine, cloth, and slaves; in return Mecca received money, weapons, cereals, and wine, which in turn were distributed throughout Arabia. The Meccans signed treaties with both the Byzantines and the Bedouins, and negotiated safe passages for caravans, giving them water and pasture rights. Mecca became the center of a loose confederation of client tribes, which included those of the Banu Tamim. Other regional powers such as the Abyssinians, Ghassanids, and Lakhmids were in decline leaving Meccan trade to be the primary binding force in Arabia in the late 6th century.

=== Muhammad and the conquest of Mecca ===
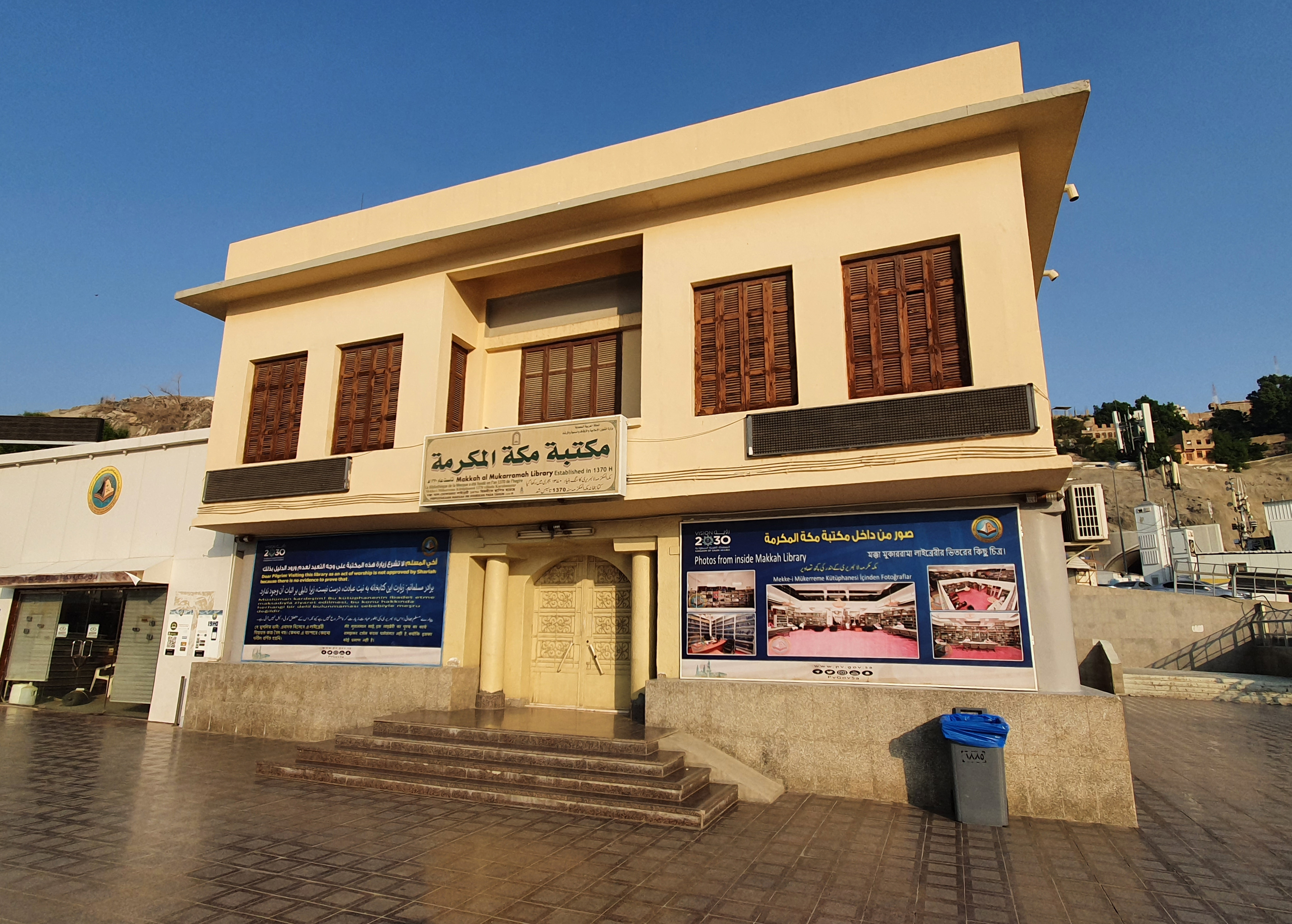
Makkah Al Mukarramah Library is believed to stand on the spot where Muhammad was born, so it is also known as the Bayt al-Mawlid (House of the Birth)

Muhammad was born in Mecca in 570, and thus Islam has been inextricably linked with it ever since. He was born into the faction of Banu Hashim in the ruling tribe of Quraysh. It was in the nearby mountain cave of Hira on Jabal al-Nour that Muhammad began receiving divine revelations from God through the archangel Jibreel in 610, according to Islamic tradition. Advocating his form of Abrahamic monotheism against Meccan paganism, and after enduring persecution from the pagan tribes for 13 years, Muhammad emigrated (Hijrah) in 622 with his companions, the Muhajirun, to Yathrib (later renamed Medina). The conflict between the Quraysh and the Muslims is accepted to have begun at this point. Overall, Meccan efforts to annihilate Islam failed and proved to be costly and unsuccessful. During the Battle of the Trench in 627, the combined armies of Arabia were unable to defeat Muhammad's forces (as the trench surrounding Muhammad's forces protected them from harm and a storm was sent to breach the Quraysh tribe). In 628, Muhammad and his followers wanted to enter Mecca for pilgrimage, but were blocked by the Quraysh. Subsequently, Muslims and Meccans entered into the Treaty of al-Hudaybiya, whereby the Quraysh and their allies promised to cease fighting Muslims and their allies and pledged to permit Muslims into the city to perform the pilgrimage the following year. It was meant to be a ceasefire for 10 years; however, just two years later, the Banu Bakr, allies of the Quraish, violated the truce by slaughtering a group of the Banu Khuza'ah, allies of the Muslims. Muhammad and his companions, now 10,000 strong, marched into Mecca and conquered the city. The pagan imagery was destroyed by Muhammad's followers and the location Islamized and rededicated to the worship of Allah alone. Mecca was declared the holiest site in Islam ordaining it as the center of Muslim pilgrimage (Hajj), one of the Islamic faith's Five Pillars.

Muhammad then returned to Medina, after assigning Attab ibn Asid as governor of the city. His other activities in Arabia led to the unification of the Arabian Peninsula under the banner of Islam. Muhammad died in 632. Within the next few hundred years, the area under the banner of Islam stretched from North Africa into Asia and parts of Europe. As the Islamic realm grew, Mecca continued to attract pilgrims from all across the Muslim world and beyond, as Muslims came to perform the annual Hajj pilgrimage. Mecca attracted a year-round population of scholars, pious Muslims who wished to live close to the Kaaba, and local inhabitants who served the pilgrims. Due to the difficulty and expense of the Hajj, pilgrims arrived by boat at Jeddah, and came overland, or joined the annual caravans from Syria or Iraq.

=== Medieval and pre-modern times ===
Mecca was never the capital of any of the Islamic states except the Zubayrid Caliphate. Muslim rulers did contribute to its upkeep, such as during the reigns of 'Umar (r. 634–644) and Uthman (r. 644–656) when concerns of flooding caused the caliphs to bring in Christian engineers to build barrages in the low-lying quarters and construct dykes and embankments to protect the area around the Kaaba.

Muhammad's return to Medina shifted the focus away from Mecca and later even further away when 'Ali, the fourth caliph, took power and chose Kufa as his capital. The Umayyad Caliphate moved the capital to Damascus in Syria and the Abbasid Caliphate to Baghdad, in modern-day Iraq, which remained the center of the Islamic Empire for nearly 500 years. Mecca re-entered Islamic political history during the Second Fitna, when it was held by Abdullah ibn al-Zubayr and the Zubayrids. The city was twice besieged by the Umayyads in 683 and 692, and for some time thereafter, the city figured little in politics, remaining a city of devotion and scholarship governed by various other factions. In 930, Mecca was attacked and sacked by Qarmatians, a millenarian Shi'a Isma'ili Muslim sect led by Abu Tahir al-Jannabi and centered in eastern Arabia. The Black Death pandemic hit Mecca in 1349.

==== Ibn Battuta's description of Mecca ====
One of the most famous travelers to Mecca in the 14th century was a Moroccan scholar and traveler, Ibn Battuta. In his rihla (account), he provides a vast description of the city. Around the year 1327 (729 AH), Ibn Battuta arrived at the holy city. Immediately, he says, it felt like a holy sanctuary, and thus he started the rites of the pilgrimage. He remained in Mecca for three years and left in 1330. During his second year in the holy city, he says his caravan arrived "with a great quantity of alms for the support of those who were staying in Mecca and Medina." While in Mecca, prayers were made for (not to) the King of Iraq and also for Salaheddin al-Ayyubi, Sultan of Egypt and Syria at the Ka'bah. Battuta says the Ka'bah was large, but was destroyed and rebuilt smaller than the original. According to Ibn Battuta, the original Kaaba, prior to the conquest of Makkah by the Prophet, contained images of angels and prophets including Jesus (Isa in Islamic tradition), his mother Mary (Maryam in Islamic tradition), and many others - Ibn Battuta however states these were all destroyed by the Prophet in the year of victory. Battuta describes the Ka'bah in his time as an important part of Mecca due to the fact that many people make the pilgrimage to it. Battuta describes the people of the city as being humble and kind, and also willing to give a part of everything they had to someone who had nothing. The inhabitants of Mecca and the village itself, he says, were very clean. There was also a sense of elegance to the village.

==== Under the Ottomans ====
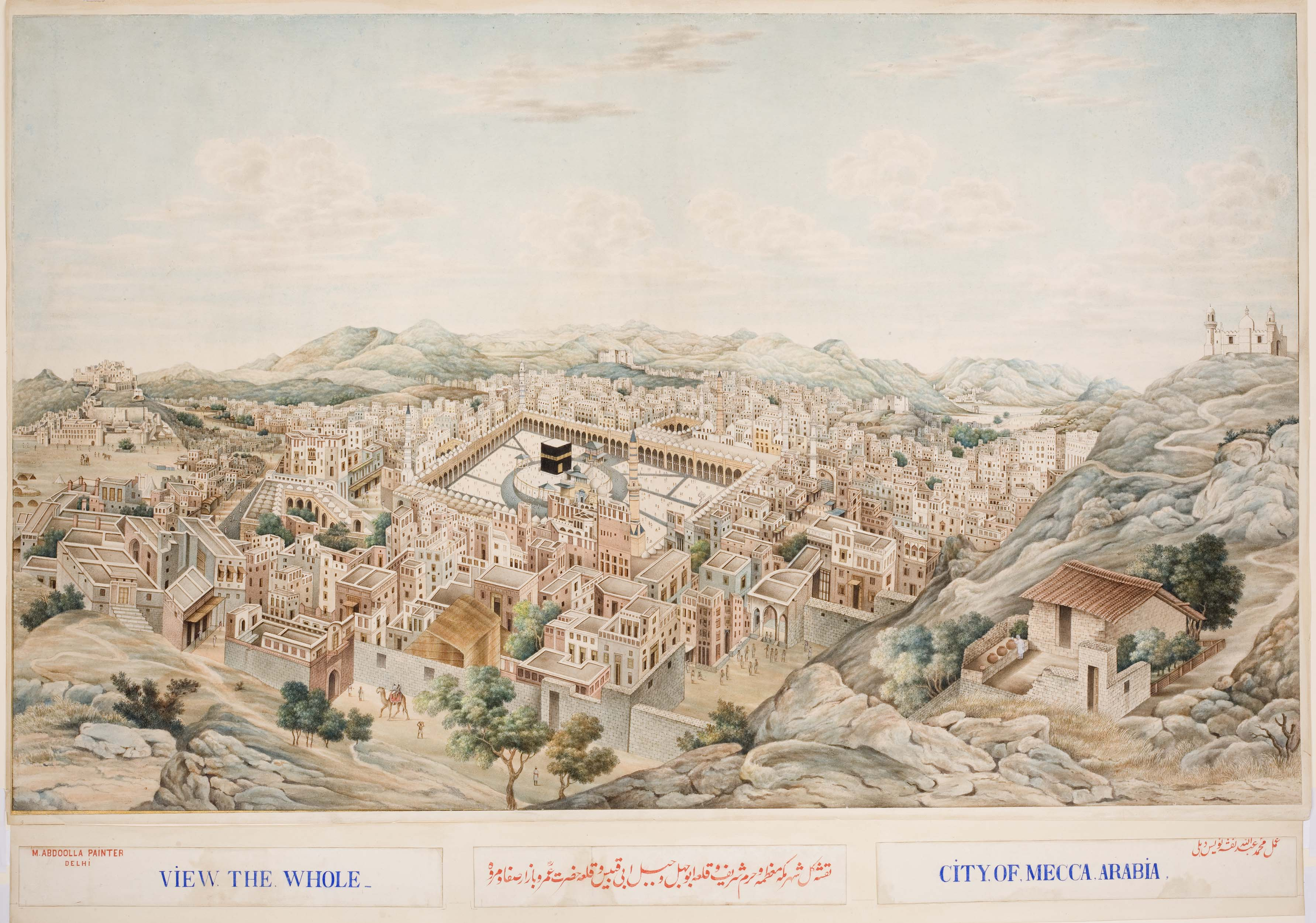
Panorama of Mecca, 1845, from the Khalili Collection of Hajj and the Arts of Pilgrimage

In 1517, the Sharif of Mecca, Barakat bin Muhammad, acknowledged the supremacy of the Ottoman Caliph but retained a great degree of local autonomy. In 1803 the city was captured by the First Saudi state, which held Mecca until 1813, destroying some of the historic tombs and domes in and around the city. The Ottomans assigned the task of bringing Mecca back under Ottoman control to their powerful Khedive (viceroy) and Wali of Egypt, Muhammad Ali Pasha. Muhammad Ali Pasha successfully returned Mecca to Ottoman control in 1813. In 1818, the Saud were defeated again but survived and founded the Second Saudi state that lasted until 1891 and led on to the present country of Saudi Arabia. In 1853, Sir Richard Francis Burton undertook the Muslim pilgrimage to Mecca and Medina disguised as a Muslim. Although Burton was certainly not the first non-Muslim European to make the Hajj (Ludovico di Varthema did this in 1503), his pilgrimage remains one of the most famous and documented of modern times. Mecca was regularly hit by cholera outbreaks. Between 1830 and 1930, cholera broke out among pilgrims at Mecca 27 times.

=== Modern history ===
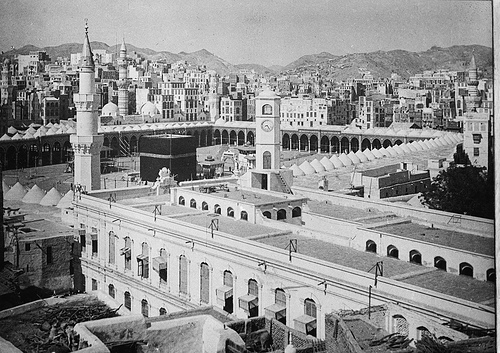
Mecca in 1910

==== Hashemite revolt and subsequent control by the Sharifate of Mecca ====
In World War I, the Ottoman Empire was at war with the Allies. It had successfully repulsed an attack on Istanbul in the Gallipoli campaign and on Baghdad in the Siege of Kut. The British intelligence officer T. E. Lawrence conspired with the Ottoman governor, Hussain bin Ali, the Sharif of Mecca to revolt against the Ottoman Empire and it was the first city captured by his forces in the Battle of Mecca (1916). Sharif's revolt proved a turning point of the war on the eastern front. Hussein declared a new state, the Kingdom of Hejaz, declaring himself the Sharif of the state and Mecca his capital. News reports in November 1916 via contact in Cairo with returning Hajj pilgrims, stated that with the Ottoman Turkish authorities gone, the Hajj of 1916 was free of the previous massive extortion and monetary demands made by the Turks who were agents of the Ottoman government.

==== Saudi conquest ====
Following the Capture of Mecca (1924), the Sharif of Mecca was overthrown by the Saud family, and Mecca was incorporated into Saudi Arabia. Under Saudi rule, much of the historic city has been demolished as a result of the Saudi government fearing these sites might become sites of association in worship besides Allah (shirk). The city has been expanded to include several towns previously considered to be separate from the holy city and now is just a few kilometers outside the main sites of the Hajj, Mina, Muzdalifah, and Arafat. Mecca is not served by any airport, due to concerns about the city's safety. It is instead served by the King Abdulaziz International Airport in Jeddah (approx. 70 km away) internationally and the Taif International Airport (approx. 120 km away) for domestic flights.

The city today is at the junction of the two most important highways in all of the Saudi Arabian highway system, Highway 40, which connects the city to Jeddah in the west and the capital, Riyadh and Dammam in the east and Highway 15, which connects it to Medina, Tabuk and onward to Jordan in the north and Abha and Jizan in the south. The Ottomans had planned to extend their railway network to the holy city, but were forced to abandon this plan due to their entry into World War I. This plan was later carried out by the Saudi government, which connected the two holy cities of Medina and Mecca with the modern Haramain High Speed Railway system which runs at 300 km/h (190 mph) and connects the two cities via Jeddah, King Abdulaziz International Airport and King Abdullah Economic City near Rabigh within two hours.

The haram area of Mecca, in which the entry of non-Muslims is forbidden, is much larger than that of Medina.

==== 1979 Grand Mosque seizure ====
On 20 November 1979, two hundred armed dissidents led by Juhayman al-Otaybi, seized the Grand Mosque, claiming the Saudi royal family no longer represented pure Islam and that the Masjid al-Haram and the Ka'bah, must be held by those of true faith. The rebels seized tens of thousands of pilgrims as hostages and barricaded themselves in the mosque. The siege lasted two weeks, and resulted in several hundred deaths and significant damage to the shrine, especially the Safa and Marwa gallery. A multinational force was finally able to retake the mosque from the dissidents. Since then, the Grand Mosque has been expanded several times, with many other expansions being undertaken in the present day.

==== Destruction of Islamic heritage sites ====
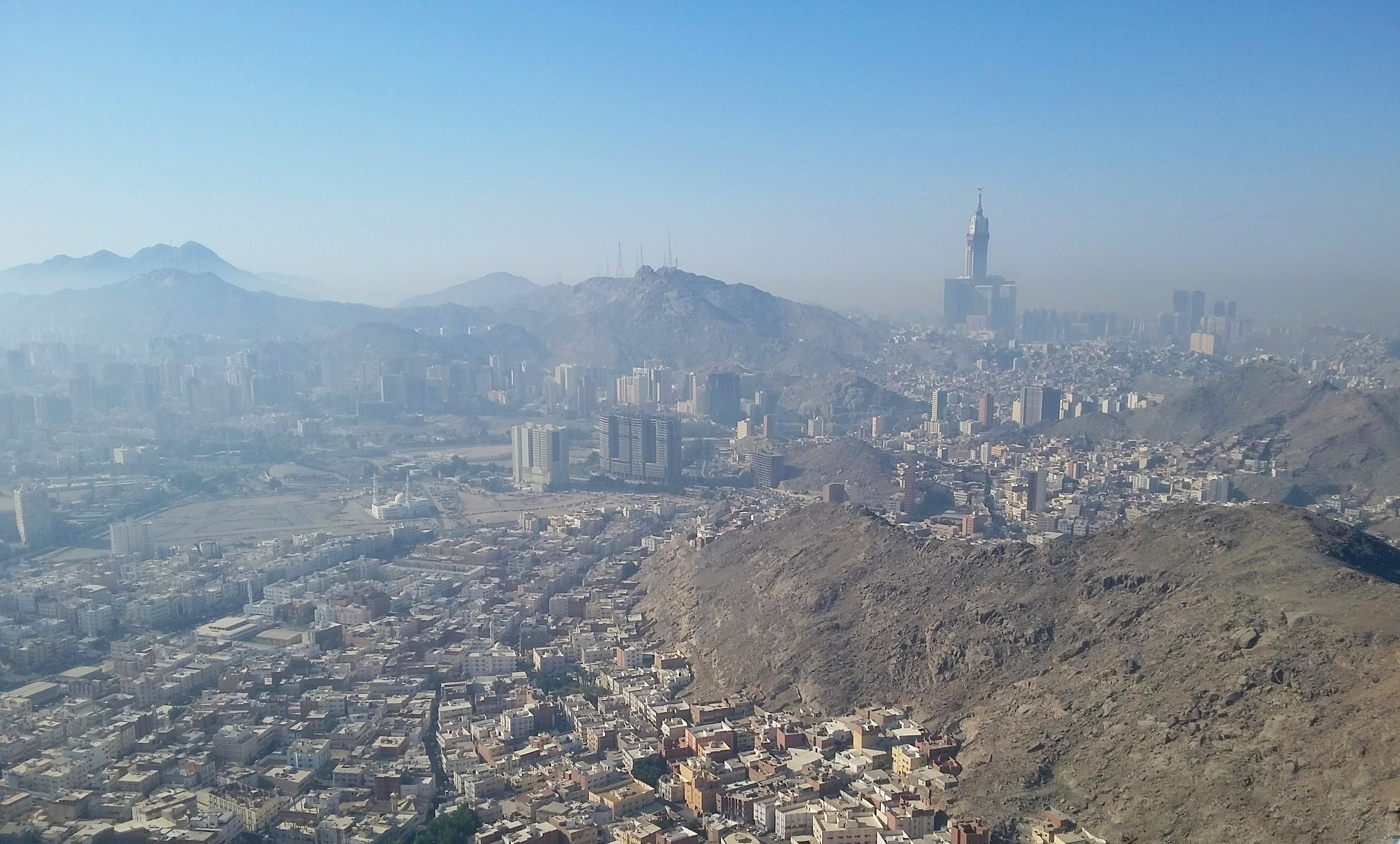
Mecca, as seen from Jabal al-Nour. The Clock Towers is visible in the skyline.

Under Saudi rule, it has been estimated that since 1985, about 95% of Mecca's historic buildings, most over a thousand years old, have been demolished. It has been reported that there are now fewer than 20 structures remaining in Mecca that date back to the time of Muhammad. Some important buildings that have been destroyed include the house of Khadijah, the wife of Muhammad, the house of Abu Bakr, Muhammad's birthplace, and the Ottoman–era Ajyad Fortress. The reason for much of the destruction of historic buildings has been for the construction of hotels, apartments, parking lots, and other infrastructure facilities for Hajj pilgrims.

==== Incidents during pilgrimage ====
Mecca has been the site of several incidents and failures of crowd control because of the large numbers of people who come to make the Hajj. For example, on 2 July 1990, a pilgrimage to Mecca ended in tragedy when the ventilation system failed in a crowded pedestrian tunnel and 1,426 people were either suffocated or trampled to death in a stampede. On 24 September 2015, 700 pilgrims were killed in a stampede at Mina during the stoning-the-Devil ritual at Jamarat.

==== 2027 total solar eclipse ====
Mecca will experience a total solar eclipse on Monday, 2 August 2027, for a duration of 5 minutes and 8 seconds.

== Significance in Islam ==
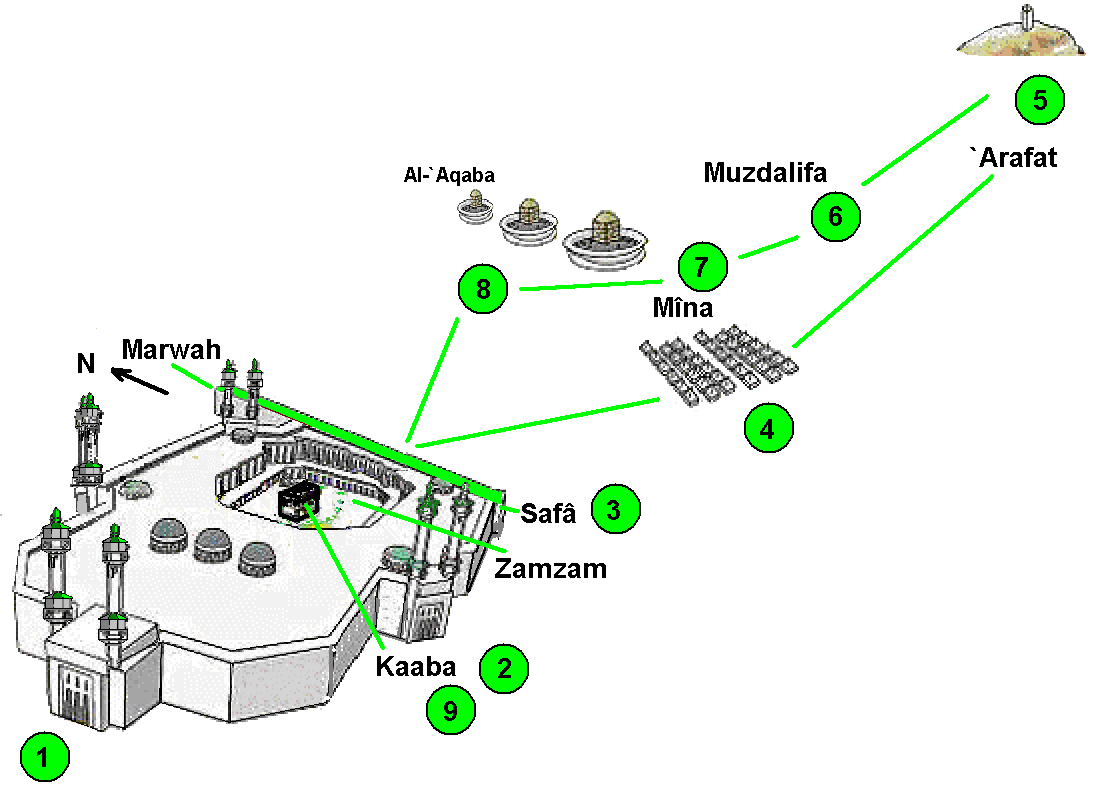
The Hajj involves pilgrims visiting Al-Haram Mosque, but mainly camping and spending time in the plains of Mina and Arafah

Mecca holds an important place in Islam and is considered the holiest city in all branches of the religion. The city derives its importance from the role it plays in the Hajj and 'Umrah and for its status as the birthplace of Muhammad.

=== Masjid al-Haram ===
The Masjid al-Haram is the site of two of the most important rites of both the Hajj and of the Umrah, the circumambulation around the Ka'bah (tawaf) and the walking between the two mounts of Safa and Marwa (sa'ee). The masjid is also the site of the Zamzam Well. According to Islamic tradition, a prayer in the masjid is equal to 100,000 prayers in any other masjid around the world.

==== Kaaba ====
There is a difference of opinion between Islamic scholars upon who first built the Ka'bah, some believe it was built by the angels while others believe it was built by Adam. Regardless, it was built several times before reaching its current state. The Ka'bah is also the common direction of prayer (qibla) for all Muslims. The surface surrounding the Ka'bah on which Muslims circumambulate it is known as the Mataf.

==== Hajr-e-Aswad (The Black Stone) ====
The Black Stone is a stone, considered by scientists to be a meteorite or of similar origin and believed by Muslims to be of divine origin. It is set in the eastern corner of the Ka'bah and it is Sunnah to touch and kiss the stone. The area around the stone is generally always crowded and guarded by policemen to ensure the pilgrims' safety. In Islamic tradition, the stone was sent down from Jannah (Paradise) and used to build the Ka'bah. It used to be a white stone (and was whiter than milk). Because of the worldly sins of man, it slowly changed color to black over the years after it was brought down to Earth.

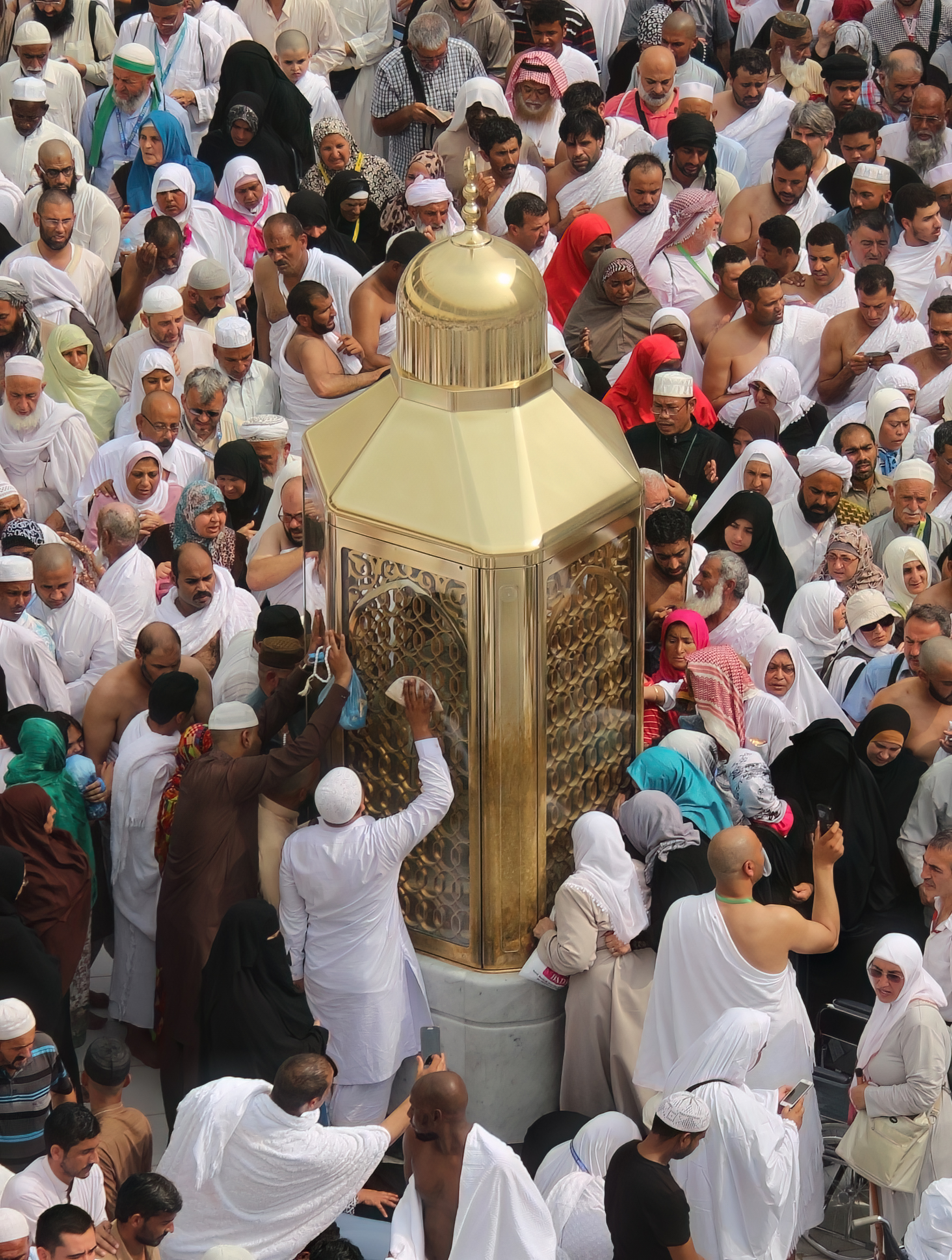
Maqam Ibrahim, Makkah

==== Maqam Ibrahim ====
This is the stone that Ibrahim (Abraham) stood on to build the higher parts of the Ka'bah. It contains two footprints that are comparatively larger than average modern-day human feet. The stone is raised and housed in a golden hexagonal chamber beside the Ka'bah on the Mataf plate. The stone inside the casing is square shaped and measures 40 cm (16 in) in length and width, and 20 cm (7.9 in) in height. It used to be enclosed by a structure called the Maqsurat Ibrahim which was covered by a sitara: an ornamental, embroidered curtain that was replaced annually. Currently, it is placed inside a golden-metal enclosure. The outer casing has changed a number of times over the years; historic photographs show that the arch of the Banu Shaybah Gate stood next to it.

==== Safa and Marwa ====
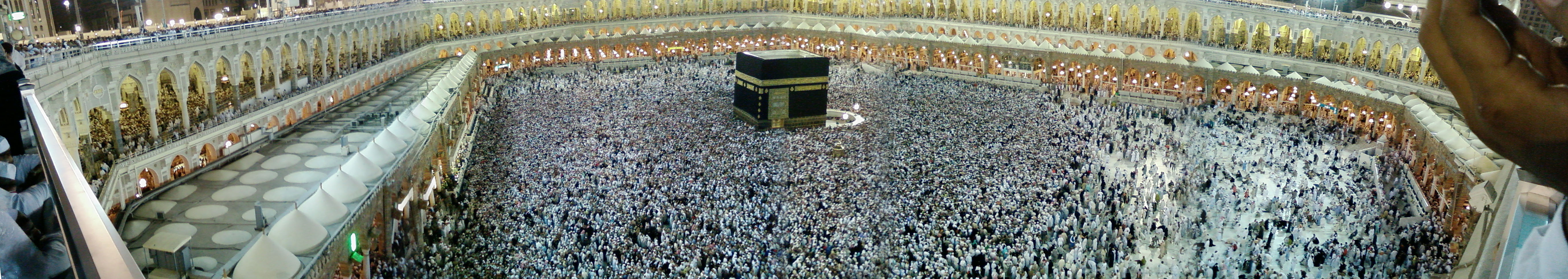
Panorama of Al-Masjid al-Haram, also known as the Grand Mosque of Mecca, during the Hajj pilgrimage

Muslims believe that in the divine revelation to Muhammad, the Quran, Allah describes the mountains of Safa and Marwah as symbols of His divinity. Walking between the two mountains seven times, four times from Safa to Marwah and three times from Marwah interchangeably, is considered a mandatory pillar (rukn) of Umrah.

=== Hajj and 'Umrah ===
The Hajj pilgrimage, also called the greater pilgrimage, attracts millions of Muslims from all over the world and almost triples Mecca's population for one week in the twelfth and final Islamic month of Dhu al-Hijjah. In 2019, the Hajj attracted 2,489,406 pilgrims to the holy city. The 'Umrah, or the lesser pilgrimage, can be done at anytime during the year. Every adult, healthy Muslim who has the financial and physical capacity to travel to Mecca must perform the Hajj at least once in a lifetime. Umrah, the lesser pilgrimage, is not obligatory, but is recommended in the Quran. In addition to the Masjid al-Haram, pilgrims also must visit the nearby towns of Mina/Muna, Muzdalifah and Mount Arafat for various rituals that are part of the Hajj.

=== Jabal al-Nour ===
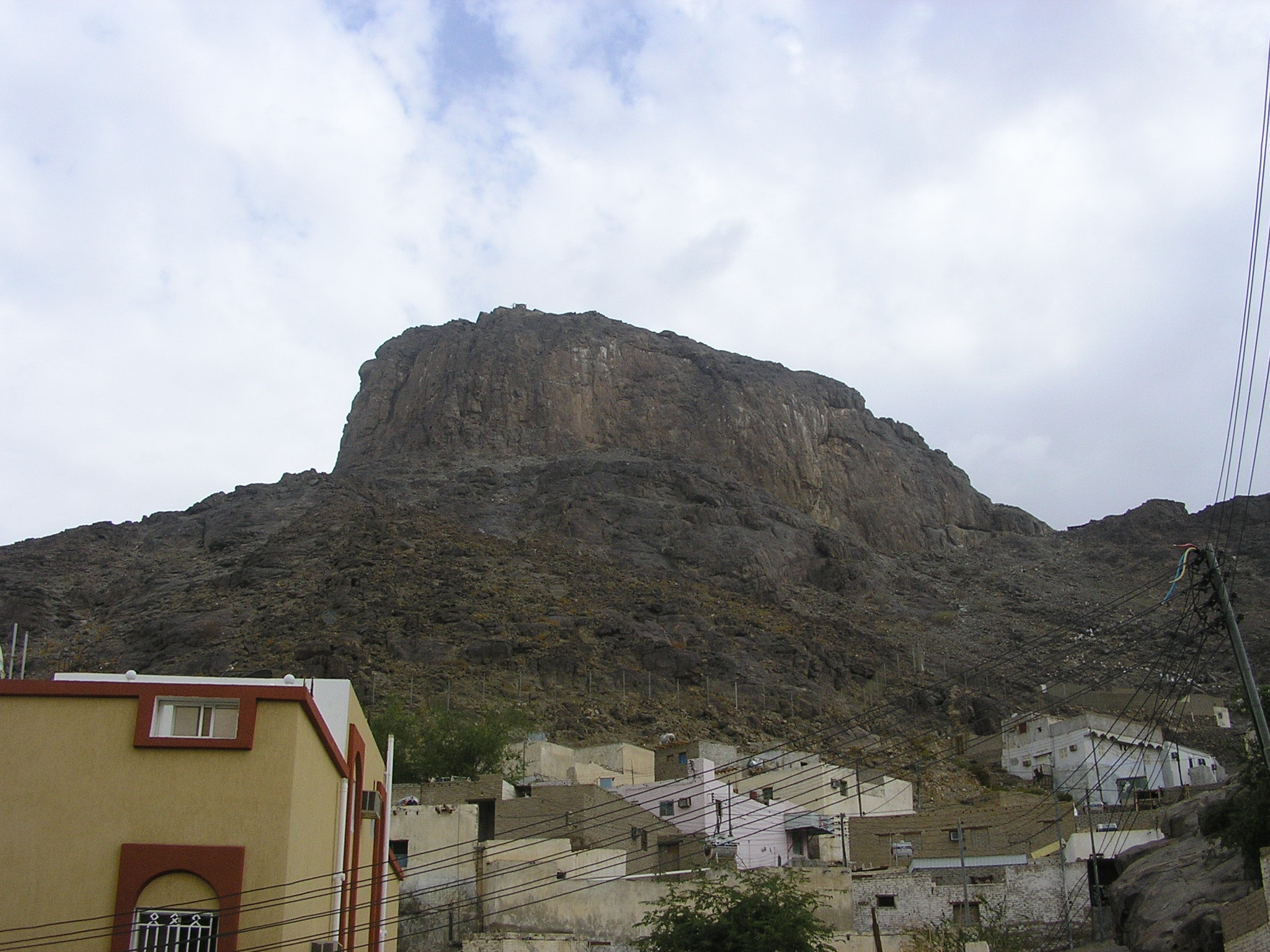
Jabal al-Nour, the mountain atop which is the Hira cave, where it is believed Muhammad received his first revelation.

Jabal al-Nour is a mountain believed by Muslims to have been the place where Muhammad spent his time away from the bustling city of Mecca in seclusion. The mountain is located on the eastern entrance of the city and is the highest point in the city at 642 meters (2,106 feet).

==== Hira'a Cave ====
Situated atop Jabal al-Nour, this is the cave where Muslims believe Muhammad received the first revelation from Allah through the archangel Gabriel (Jibril in Islamic tradition) at the age of 40.

== Geography ==
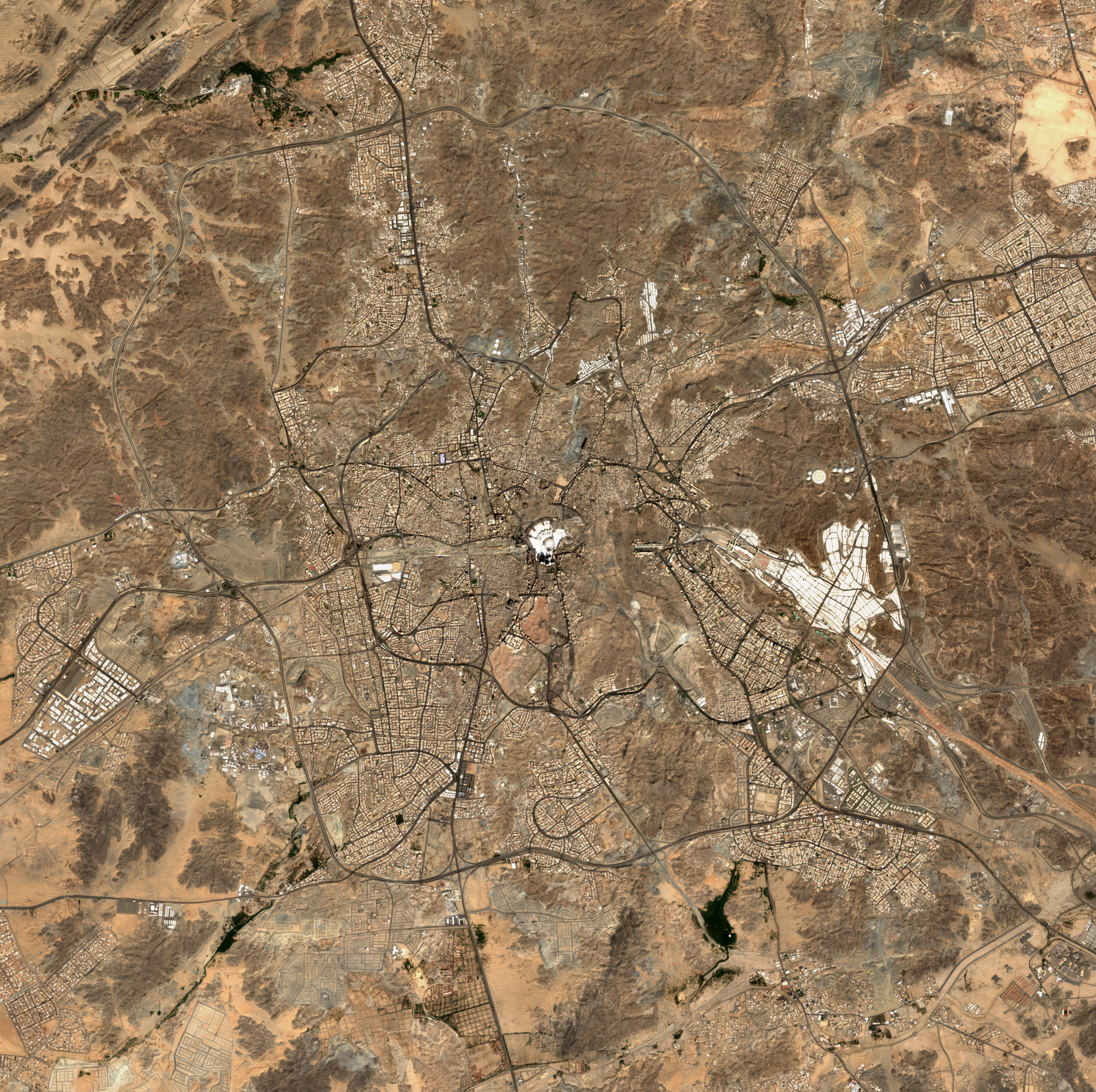
Mecca as seen from the International Space Station. Haram is visible in the center while Mina is visible in the east.

Mecca is located in the Hijazi region, a 200 km (124 mi) wide strip of mountains separating the Nafud desert from the Red Sea. The city is situated in a valley with the same name around 70 km (43 mi) east of the port city of Jeddah. Mecca is one of the lowest cities in elevation in the Hejazi region, located at an elevation of 277 m (909 ft) above sea level at 21º23' north latitude and 39º51' east longitude. Mecca is divided into 34 districts.

The city centers on the al-Haram area, which contains the Masjid al-Haram. The area around the mosque is the old city and contains the most famous district of Mecca, Ajyad. The main street that runs to al-Haram is the Ibrahim al-Khalil Street, named after Ibrahim. Traditional, historical homes built of local rock, two to three stories long are still present within the city's central area, within view of modern hotels and shopping complexes. The total area of modern Mecca is over 1,200 km^{2} (460 sq mi).

=== Elevation ===
Mecca is at an elevation of 277 m (909 ft) above sea level, and approximately 70 km (44 mi) inland from the Red Sea. It is one of the lowest in the Hejazi region, although some mountain peaks in Mecca reach 1,000 m (3,300 ft) in height.

=== Topography ===
The city center lies in a corridor between mountains, which is often called the "Hollow of Mecca." The area contains the valley of al-Taneem, the valley of Bakkah and the valley of Abqar. This mountainous location has defined the contemporary expansion of the city.

=== Sources of water ===
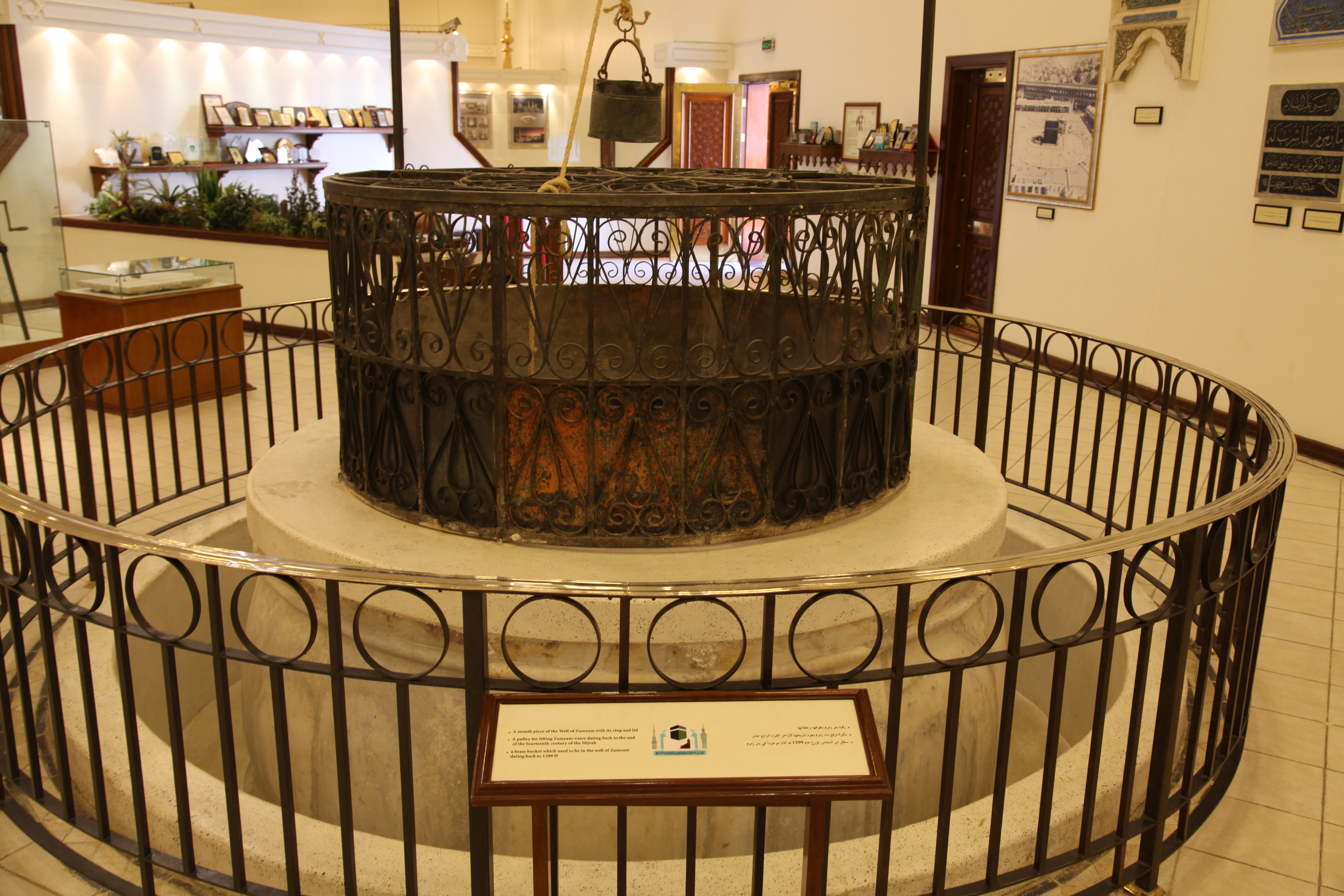
The mouthpiece of the well of Zamzam

Due to Mecca's climatic conditions water scarcity has been an issue throughout its history. In pre-modern Mecca, the city used a few chief sources of water. Among them were local wells, such as the Zamzam Well, that produced generally brackish water. Finding a sustainable water source to supply Mecca's permanent population and the large number of annual pilgrims was an undertaking that began in the Abbasid era under the auspices of Zubayda, the wife of the caliph Harun ar-Rashid. (Note: Possibly following their pilgrimage in 805 and seeing the city's issues with its water supply.) She donated funds for the deepening of Zamzam Well and funded a massive construction project likely costing 1.75 million gold dinars. The project encompassed the construction of an underground aqueduct from the Arabic: عين حنين, romanized: ʿAyn Ḥunayn, lit. 'Spring of Hunayn' and smaller water sources in the area to Mecca in addition to the construction of a waterworks on Mount Arafat called Arabic: عين زبيدة, romanized: ʿAyn Zubayda, lit. 'Spring of Zubayda' using a separate conduit to connect it to Mecca and the Masjid al-Haram. Over time however the system deteriorated and failed to fulfil its function. Thus in 1245, 1361, 1400, 1474, and 1510 different rulers invested into extensive repairs of the system. In 1525, due to the system's troubles persisting however the Ottoman sultan Suleiman the Magnificent began a construction project to rebuild the aqueduct in its entirety, the project took until 1571 to be completed. Its water quality was greatly lacking during the 19th century until a restoration and cleaning project by Osman Pasha began.

Another source which sporadically provided water was rainfall which was stored by the people in small reservoirs or cisterns. According to al-Kurdī, there had been 89 floods by 1965. In the last century, the most severe flood was that of 1942. Since then, dams have been built to ameliorate this problem.

In the modern day, water treatment plants and desalination facilities have been constructed and are being constructed to provide suitable amounts of water fit for human consumption to the city.

=== Climate ===
Mecca features a hot desert climate (Köppen: BWh), in three different plant hardiness zones: 10, 11 and 12. Like most Saudi Arabian cities, Mecca retains warm to hot temperatures even in winter, which can range from 19 °C (66 °F) at night to 30 °C (86 °F) in the afternoon. Summer temperatures are extremely hot and consistently break the 40 °C (104 °F) mark in the afternoon, dropping to 30 °C (86 °F) in the evening, but humidity remains relatively low, at 30–40%. Rain usually falls in Mecca in small amounts scattered between November and January, with heavy thunderstorms also common during the winter. Occasional summer rainfall in recent years has been associated with the northward movement of the Intertropical Convergence Zone.

Climate data for Mecca (1991–2020 normals)
Month	Jan	Feb	Mar	Apr	May	Jun	Jul	Aug	Sep	Oct	Nov	Dec	Year
Record high °C (°F)	39.0 (102.2)	40.0 (104.0)	42.4 (108.3)	44.7 (112.5)	49.4 (120.9)	51.8 (125.2)	51.0 (123.8)	50.0 (122.0)	49.8 (121.6)	47.0 (116.6)	41.2 (106.2)	39.4 (102.9)	51.8 (125.2)
Mean daily maximum °C (°F)	30.9 (87.6)	32.6 (90.7)	35.4 (95.7)	39.0 (102.2)	42.4 (108.3)	43.9 (111.0)	43.2 (109.8)	42.9 (109.2)	42.9 (109.2)	40.4 (104.7)	35.6 (96.1)	32.5 (90.5)	38.5 (101.3)
Daily mean °C (°F)	24.3 (75.7)	25.4 (77.7)	27.8 (82.0)	31.3 (88.3)	34.6 (94.3)	36.2 (97.2)	36.2 (97.2)	35.9 (96.6)	35.2 (95.4)	32.5 (90.5)	28.7 (83.7)	25.9 (78.6)	31.2 (88.1)
Mean daily minimum °C (°F)	19.2 (66.6)	19.9 (67.8)	21.8 (71.2)	25.1 (77.2)	28.1 (82.6)	29.3 (84.7)	29.8 (85.6)	30.1 (86.2)	29.2 (84.6)	26.5 (79.7)	23.4 (74.1)	20.7 (69.3)	25.3 (77.5)
Record low °C (°F)	8.6 (47.5)	9.2 (48.6)	11.0 (51.8)	13.4 (56.1)	17.0 (62.6)	19.8 (67.6)	20.2 (68.4)	22.0 (71.6)	18.0 (64.4)	15.5 (59.9)	14.2 (57.6)	9.8 (49.6)	8.6 (47.5)
Average precipitation mm (inches)	20.7 (0.81)	2.5 (0.10)	5.2 (0.20)	8.3 (0.33)	2.6 (0.10)	0.0 (0.0)	1.4 (0.06)	5.8 (0.23)	6.3 (0.25)	14.1 (0.56)	23.2 (0.91)	24.7 (0.97)	104.6 (4.12)
Average precipitation days (≥ 1.0 mm)	1.8	0.3	0.6	0.7	0.3	0.0	0.1	0.8	0.7	1.1	1.7	1.3	9.6
Average relative humidity (%) (daily average)	58	54	48	43	36	33	34	39	45	50	58	59	46
Mean monthly sunshine hours	251.1	234.6	260.1	273.0	313.1	330.6	313.7	297.9	288.0	303.8	252.0	254.7	3,472.6
Mean daily sunshine hours	8.4	8.7	9.1	9.4	9.8	10.7	10.1	9.6	9.4	9.7	8.8	8.0	9.3
Percentage possible sunshine	76	76	73	74	80	84	79	77	81	86	79	77	79
Source 1: NOAA, Jeddah Regional Climate Center
Source 2: National Center for Meteorology (sunshine hours, 1991–2020)

== Economy ==
The Meccan economy is heavily dependent on pilgrimages coming for Umrah and Hajj. Income generated through pilgrimage also has far-reaching effects on the economy of the entire Arabian Peninsula.

=== Methods of income generation ===
==== Taxes ====
Taxes on pilgrims were increased during the Great Depression, many of which existed to as late as 1972.

==== Services ====
The Saudi flag carrier Saudia generates 12% of its income from the pilgrimage. Fares paid by pilgrims to reach Mecca by land also generate income; as do the hotels and lodging companies that house them. The city takes in more than $100 million, while the Saudi government spends about $50 million on services for the Hajj. There are some industries and factories in the city, but Mecca no longer plays a major role in Saudi Arabia's economy, which is mainly based on oil exports. The few industries operating in Mecca include textiles, furniture, and utensils. The majority of the economy is service-oriented.

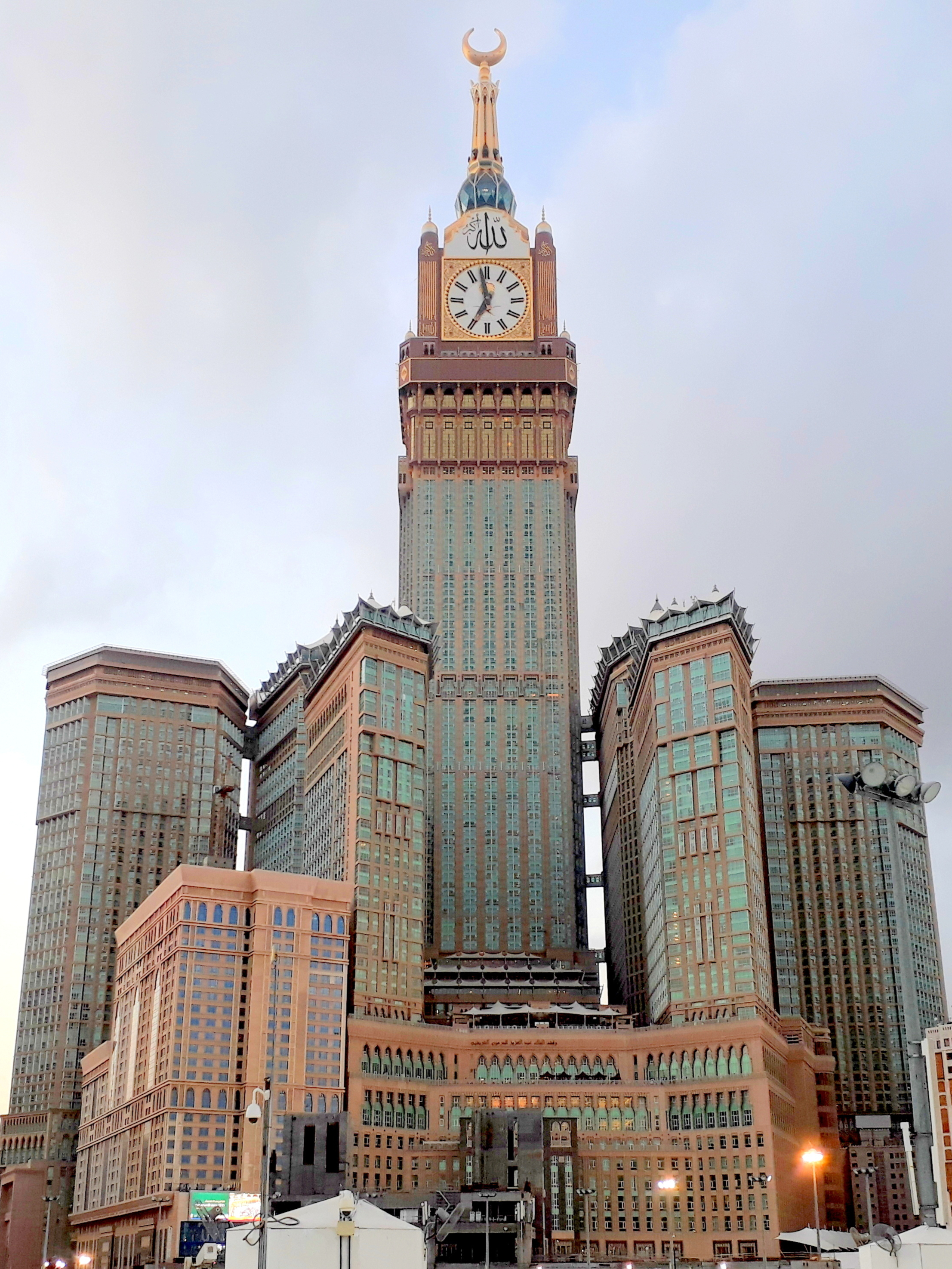
The Clock Towers in Mecca

=== Industry ===
Various types of enterprises that have existed since 1970 in the city include corrugated iron manufacturing, copper extraction, carpentry, upholstery, bakeries, farming, and banking. The city has grown substantially in the 20th and 21st centuries, as the convenience and affordability of jet travel has increased the number of pilgrims participating in the Hajj. Thousands of Saudis are employed year-round to oversee the Hajj and staff the hotels and shops that cater to pilgrims; these workers in turn have increased the demand for housing and services. The city is now ringed by freeways and contains shopping malls and skyscrapers.

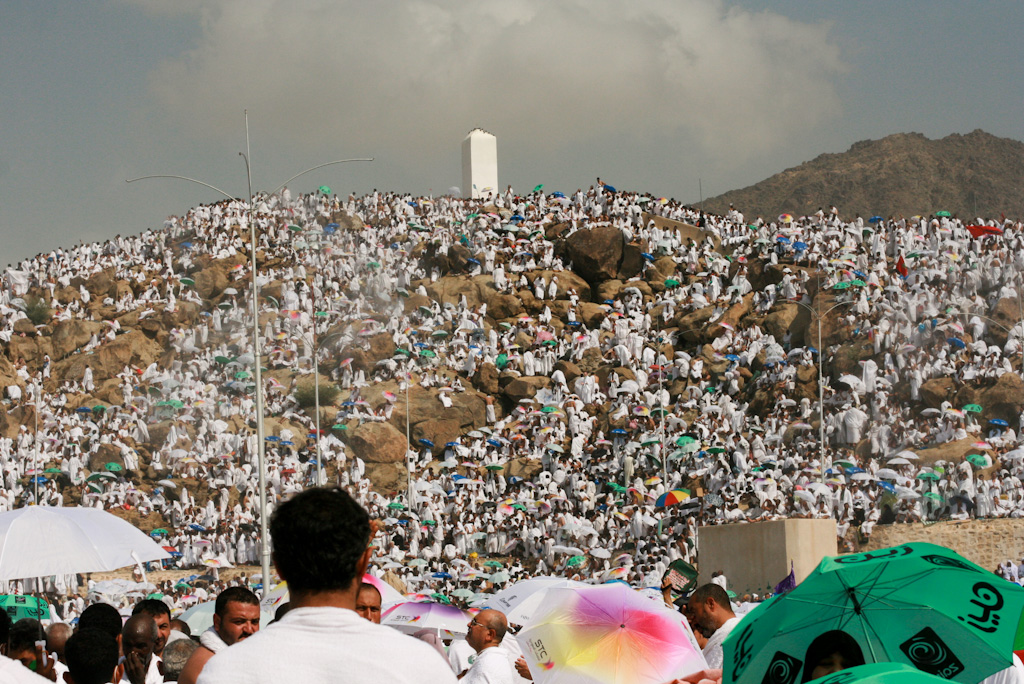
Pilgrims are the driving force of Mecca's economy

A new industrial city is being developed in Al Akashiya district of Makkah by the Saudi Authority for Industrial Cities and Technology Zones. It covers an area of 45 square kilometres (11,000 acres).

== Education ==
Formal education started to be developed in the late Ottoman period continuing slowly into Hashemite times. The first major attempt to improve the situation was made by a Jeddah merchant, Muhammad ʿAlī Zaynal Riḍā, who founded the Madrasat al-Falāḥ in Mecca in 1911–12 that cost £400,000. The school system in Mecca has many public and private schools for both males and females. As of 2005, there were 532 public and private schools for males and another 681 public and private schools for female students. The medium of instruction in both public and private schools is Arabic with emphasis on English as a second language, but some private schools founded by foreign entities such as International schools use the English language as the medium of instruction. Some of these are coeducational while other schools are not. For higher education, the city has only one university, Umm Al-Qura University, which was established in 1949 as a college and became a public university in 1981.

== Healthcare ==
Healthcare is provided by the Saudi government free of charge to all pilgrims. There are ten main hospitals in Mecca:

- Ajyad Hospital (مُسْتَشْفَى أَجْيَاد)
- King Faisal Hospital (مُسْتَشْفَى ٱلْمَلِك فَيْصَل بِحَي ٱلشّشه)
- King Abdulaziz Hospital (مُسْتَشْفَى ٱلْمَلِك عَبْد ٱلْعَزِيْز بِحَي ٱلـزَّاهِر)
- Al Noor Specialist Hospital (مُسْتَشْفَى ٱلنُّوْر ٱلتَّخَصُّصِي)
- Hira'a Hospital (مُسْتَشْفَى حِرَاء)
- Maternity and Children's Hospital (مُسْتَشْفَى ٱلْوِلَادَة وَٱلْأَطْفَال)
- King Abdullah Medical City (مَدِيْنَة ٱلْمَلِك عَبْد ٱلله ٱلطِّبِيَّة)
- Khulais General Hospital (مُسْتَشْفَى خُلَيْص ٱلْعَام)
- Al Kamel General Hospital (مُسْتَشْفَى ٱلْكَامِل ٱلْعَام)
- Ibn Sina Hospital (مُسْتَشْفَى ابْن سِيْنَا بِحَدَاء / بَحْرَه)

There are also many walk-in clinics available for both residents and pilgrims. Several temporary clinics are set up during the Hajj to tend to wounded pilgrims.

== Demographics ==
Mecca is very densely populated. Most long-term residents live in the Old City, the area around the Great Mosque and many work to support pilgrims, known locally as the Hajj industry. 'Iyad Madani, the Saudi Arabian Minister for Hajj, was quoted saying, "We never stop preparing for the Hajj."

Year-round, pilgrims stream into the city to perform the rites of 'Umrah, and during the last weeks of eleventh Islamic month, Dhu al-Qi'dah, on average 2–4 million Muslims arrive in the city to take part in the rites known as Hajj. Pilgrims are from varying ethnicities and backgrounds, mainly South and Southeast Asia, Europe and Africa. Many of these pilgrims have remained and become residents of the city. By the 19th century, people of South Asian origin had come to constitute 20% of the population. The Burmese are an older, more established community who number roughly 250,000. Adding to this, the discovery of oil in the past 50 years has brought hundreds of thousands of working immigrants.

Non-Muslims are not permitted to enter Mecca under Saudi law, and using fraudulent documents to do so may result in arrest and prosecution. The prohibition extends to Ahmadis, as they are considered non-Muslims. Nevertheless, many non-Muslims and Ahmadis have visited the city as these restrictions are loosely enforced. The first such recorded example of a non-Muslim entering the city is that of Ludovico di Varthema of Bologna in 1503. Guru Nanak, the founder of Sikhism, is said to have visited Mecca in December 1518. One of the most famous was Richard Francis Burton, who traveled as a Qadiriyya Sufi from Afghanistan in 1853.

Historical population

Year	Pop.	±% p.a.
2004	1,294,440	—
2010	1,534,731	+2.88%

Year	Pop.	±% p.a.
2022	2,385,509	+3.74%

Mecca Province is the only province where expatriates outnumber Saudis.

== Culture ==
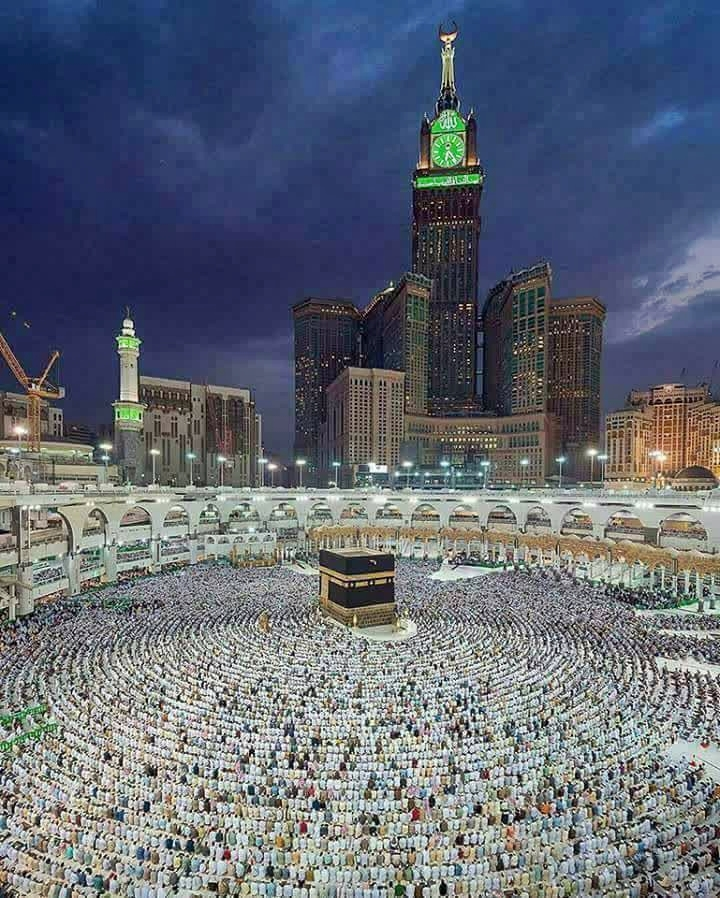
Al-Haram Mosque, the Kaaba, and The Clock Towers

Mecca's culture has been affected by the large number of pilgrims that arrive annually, and thus boasts a rich cultural heritage. As a result of the vast numbers of pilgrims coming to the city each year, Mecca has become by far the most diverse city in the Muslim world.

=== Sports ===
In pre-modern Mecca, the most common sports were impromptu wrestling and foot races. Football is now the most popular sport in Mecca and the kingdom. The city hosts some of the oldest sport clubs in Saudi Arabia, such as Al-Wehda FC (established in 1945). King Abdulaziz Stadium is the largest stadium in Mecca with a capacity of 38,000.

=== Architectural landmarks ===
Adorning the southern facade of the Masjid al-Haram is the Abraj al-Bait Complex; towering over the Great Mosque, it is a seven-building complex with the central clock tower having a length of 601 m (1,972 feet), making it the world's fourth-tallest building. All seven buildings in the complex also form the fifth-largest building by floor area.

The Mecca Gate, known popularly as the Quran Gate, sits on the western entrance of the city, which is the route from Jeddah. Located on Highway 40, it marks the boundary of the Haram area where non-Muslims are prohibited from entering. The gate was designed in 1979 by an Egyptian architect, Samir Elabd, for the architectural firm IDEA Center. The structure is that of a book, representing the Quran, sitting on a rehal, or bookrest.

== Communications ==
=== Press and newspapers ===
The first press was brought to Mecca in 1885 by Osman Nuri Pasha, an Ottoman Wāli. During the Hashemite period, it was used to print the city's official gazette, Al Qibla. The Saudi regime expanded this press into a larger operation, introducing the new Saudi official gazette of Mecca, Umm al-Qurā. Mecca also has its own paper owned by the city, Al Nadwa. However, other Saudi newspapers are also provided in Mecca such as the Saudi Gazette, Al Madinah, Okaz and Al Bilad, in addition to other international newspapers.

=== Television ===
Telecommunications in the city were emphasized early under the Saudi reign. King Abdulaziz pressed them forward as he saw them as a means of convenience and better governance. While under Hussein bin Ali, there were about 20 public telephones in the entire city; in 1936, the number jumped to 450, totaling about half the telephones in the country. During that time, telephone lines were extended to Jeddah and Ta'if, but not to the capital, Riyadh. By 1985, Mecca, like other Saudi cities, possessed modern telephone, telex, radio and television communications. Many television stations serve the city area, including Saudi TV1, Saudi TV2, Saudi TV Sports, Al-Ekhbariya, Arab Radio and Television Network and various cable, satellite and other specialty television providers.

=== Radio ===
Limited radio communication was established within the Kingdom under the Hashemites. In 1929, wireless stations were set up in various towns in the region, creating a network that would become fully functional by 1932. Soon after World War II, the existing network was greatly expanded and improved. Since then, radio communication has been used extensively in directing the pilgrimage and addressing the pilgrims. This practice started in 1950, with the initiation of broadcasts on the Day of 'Arafah (9 Dhu al-Hijjah), and increased until 1957, at which time Radio Makkah became the most powerful station in the Middle East at 50 kW. Later, power was increased nine-fold to 450 kW. Music was not immediately broadcast; gradually, folk music was introduced.

== Transportation ==
=== Air ===
The only airport near the city is the Mecca East airport, which is not active. Mecca is primarily served by King Abdulaziz International Airport in Jeddah for international and regional connections and Ta'if Regional Airport for regional connections. To cater to the large number of Hajj pilgrims, Jeddah Airport has a Hajj Terminal, specifically for use during the Hajj season; the terminal can accommodate 47 planes simultaneously while receiving 3,800 pilgrims per hour during the Hajj season.

=== Roads ===
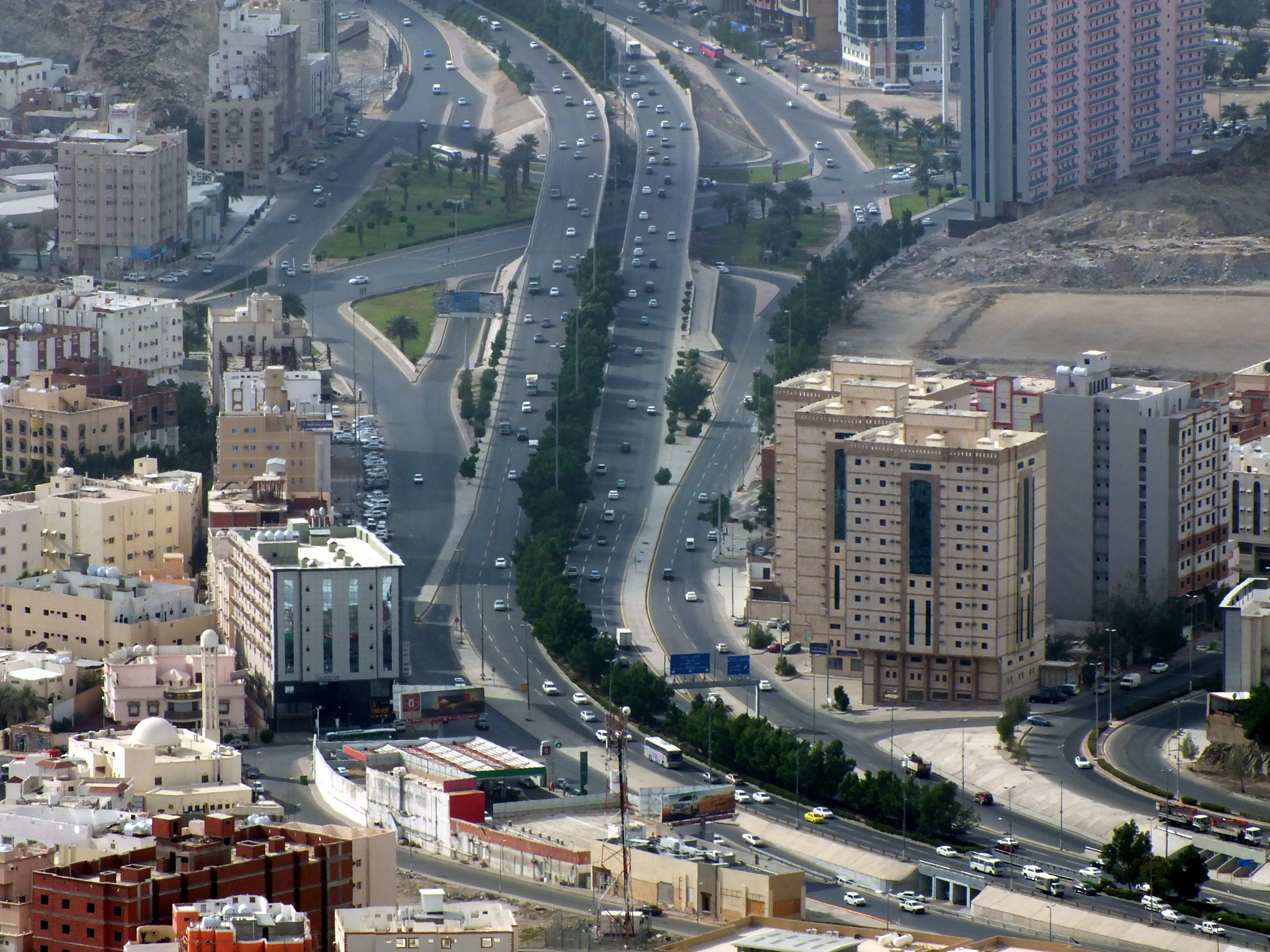
3rd Ring Road passing through Kudai Area

Mecca, similar to Medina, lies at the junction of two of the most important highways in Saudi Arabia, Highway 40, connecting it to the important port city of Jeddah in the west and the capital of Riyadh and the other major port city, Dammam, in the east. The other, Highway 15, connects Mecca to the other holy Islamic city of Medina approximately 400 km (249 mi) in the north and onward to Tabuk and Jordan. While in the south, it connects Mecca to Abha and Jizan. Mecca is served by four ring roads, and these are very crowded compared to the three ring roads of Medina. Mecca also has many tunnels.

=== Rail ===
==== Rapid transit ====
The Al Masha'er Al Muqaddassah Metro is a metro line in Mecca opened on 13 November 2010. The 18.1-kilometer (11.2-mile) elevated metro transports pilgrims to the holy sites of 'Arafat, Muzdalifah and Mina in the city to reduce congestion on the road and is only operational during the Hajj season. It consists of nine stations, three in each of the aforementioned towns.

The Mecca Metro, officially known as Makkah Mass Rail Transit, is a planned four-line metro system for the city. This will be in addition to the Al Masha'er Al Muqaddassah Metro which carries pilgrims.

==== Intercity ====
In 2018, the Haramain High Speed Railway entered operation, connecting the holy cities of Mecca and Medina together via Jeddah, King Abdulaziz International Airport and King Abdullah Economic City in Rabigh. The railway consists of 35 electric trains and is capable of transporting 60 million passengers annually. Each train can achieve speeds of up to 300 km/h (190 mph), traveling a total distance of 450 km (280 mi), reducing the travel time between the two cities to less than two hours.

Services at Mecca station
- Preceding station	Saudi Arabia Railways	Following station
  Jeddah towards Medina	Haramain High Speed Railway	Terminus

== See also ==
- Bayt al-Mawlid, the house where Muhammad is believed to have been born
- Climate of Mecca
- Sharifate of Mecca
- Masar Destination
- Al-Rayah Mosque

== Bibliography ==
- What life was like in the lands of the prophet: Islamic world, AD 570–1405. Time-Life Books. 1999. ISBN 978-0-7835-5465-5.
- Lapidus, Ira M. (1988). A History of Islamic Societies. Cambridge University Press. ISBN 978-0-521-22552-6.
