= Zaydan =

Zaydan is a surname. Notable people with the surname include:

- Banu Zaydan, Arab clan that dominated the Galilee late 17th-early 18th centuries
- Amina Zaydan (born 1966), Egyptian novelist
- Hasan Zaydan, Iraqi politician
- Ibn Zaydan (1878–1946), Moroccan historian and literary author
- Jurji Zaydan (1861–1914), Lebanese novelist
- Muhamad Salah al-din al-Halim Zaydan (born 1960 or 1963), Islamic militant
- Muhammad Husayn Zaydan (1902–1992), Saudi historian and philosopher
