= Al Nadwa =

Saudi daily newspaper (1958–2013)

- Type: Daily newspaper
- Founder: Ahmed Al Subaii
- Publisher: Makkah Publishing and Information Establishment
- Editor-in-chief: Ahmad bin Saleh
- Founded: 1958
- Ceased publication: February 2013
- Political alignment: Pro-government; Religiously conservative
- Language: Arabic
- Headquarters: Jeddah
- Country: Saudi Arabia

Al Nadwa (Arabic: الندوة The Forum) was a Mecca-based daily newspaper published in Saudi Arabia. The publication was in circulation until 2013 when it was renamed Makkah.

== History and profile ==
Al Nadwa was founded in 1958 in Mecca by Ahmad Al Subaii. Al Nadwa incorporated with another paper, Hera (a name of holy mountain in Islam). Initially published on a weekly basis, the paper became a daily publication in 1960.

The publisher of the paper was Makkah Printing and Information Establishment. Abdulaziz bin Mohieddin Khoja was the chairman of the general assembly of Makkah Establishment for Publishing and Printing. Ahmad bin Saleh served as the editor-in-chief of the paper.

Due to financial difficulties, the paper ceased production in 2013.

The paper was considered as pro-government.

Al Nadwa sold 7,000 copies in 1962 and 15,000 copies in 1975. Its 2003 circulation was 30,000 copies.

Although the paper had no high circulation levels, it enjoyed a special status as a result of being Mecca's hometown paper and of having good editorial writings.

== Content ==
Al Nadwa's article about Avicenna, Zakaria Razi and Abu Reyhan Birouni dated 1964 caused a diplomatic crisis between Saudi Arabia and the Imperial Iran due to the fact that they were described by the paper as Arab thinkers.

The U.S. diplomatic cables reported that Al Nadwa was the only paper condemned the Iraqi invasion of Kuwait in 1990 before the Saudi government displayed a clear official position concerning this event. Additionally, in the 1990s, a series of articles, criticising extremist views, was published in the paper. The target of these criticisms were initially non-Saudi Islamic figures such as Sudanese Hasan Al Turabi. However, later the paper began to criticise Safar Al Hawali and Ayidh Al Qarni. The criticism against these two Saudi Islamic figures led to public anger. As a result, columnist Yousuf Damanhouri was removed from the paper's board of editors. The paper, unlike many other Saudi daily papers, also reported the incident of fire in girls' school in Mecca in 2002, killing fifteen female students as a result of the muttawa's curtailing the attempts of rescue workers. Furthermore, then-editor-in-chief of the paper, Abdul Rahman Saad Alorabi, employed women reporters to interview with the women in the family of victims and surviving female students.

The paper openly reported the negative physical conditions experienced in Mecca. For instance, it reported in 2007 that although Al Bayary, an old street, is in close proximity to Masjid Al Haram, it seriously suffers from lack of electricity and water facilities as well as sewerage problems.
