= Al-Bilad (Saudi newspaper) =

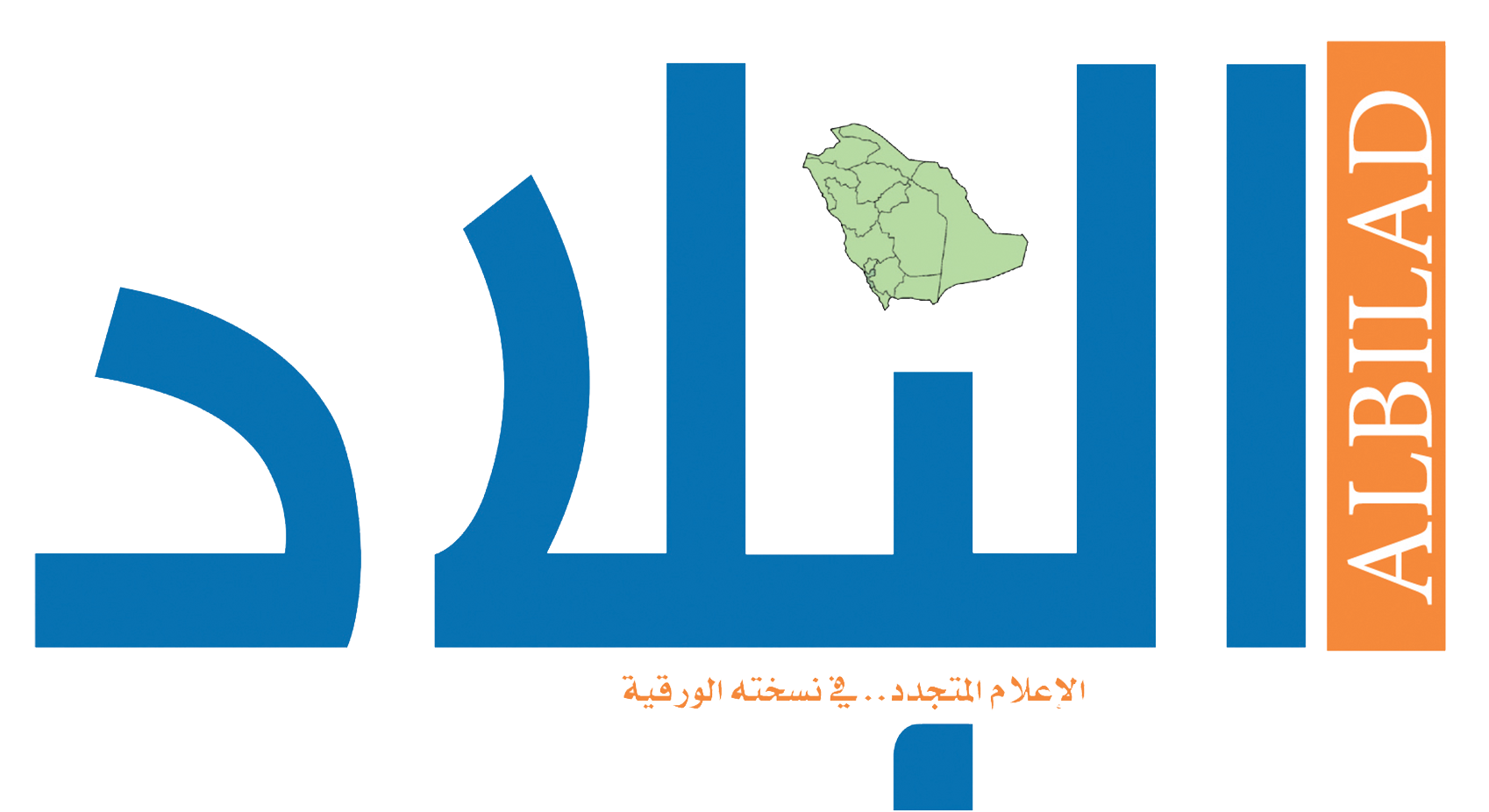
- Type: Daily newspaper
- Owner: Al Bilad Est
- Editor-in-chief: Abdullah Alharthi
- Founded: 1932; 94 years ago
- Language: Arabic
- Headquarters: Jeddah
- Website: albiladdaily.com//

Al Bilad (Arabic: صحيفة البلاد السعودية) is a Saudi Arabian daily newspaper located in Jeddah.

== History ==
Al Bilad is the first daily newspaper in Saudi Arabia, founded by Mohammad Saleh Nasif on 3 April 1932 under the name Sawt al-Hijaz (Arabic: Voice of Hijaz). In March 1946, it became Al Bilad Al Saudia, and in January 1959 the paper merged with Arafat newspaper. It was then renamed Al Bilad Daily.

Ghalib Hamza Abulfaraj, a Saudi businessman, served as the editor-in-chief of the paper. Abdullah Alharthi was appointed editor-in-chief in February 2025; his appointment was confirmed in November 2025 after an eight-month interim period.

== See also ==
- List of newspapers in Saudi Arabia
