= Primor =

Primor is a Hungarian title of nobility of Székely origin. It was the highest-ranking title in Székely aristocracy, and is usually compared in rank with the Western titles of count and baron. Synonyms sometimes found in older sources are főnemes (chief noble), főúr (chief lord), or főszékely (chief Székely).

== Origins ==
Traditionally, on paper, all Székely were considered nobles. Their nobility was derived from their settlement in Székely Land as terra nullius (not yet belonging to anyone, including to the Hungarian king). Being nobles, all members of Székely society were personally bound to take up arms in defence of their country (Székely Land at the time forming the Eastern border of Hungary, and in part of Christian Europe). According to their ability to do so, they were divided into three categories. The pixidarii (commoners) were those who had a small plot of land, but did not have a horse, and as such were enlisted as infantrymen. The wealthier primipilus, also called lófő ("chief horsemen") or equites, comparable to knights, and bound to take part in battle as cavalry soldiers. The primores, finally, were nobles with considerable land and wealth, and as such, were expected to provide an armed force.

Later, the primors began to expand their power over the other two groups, attaining a status comparable to the higher aristocracy of medieval Hungary. Under King Matthias, during the 15th century, the primores' status was codified in law. Conversely time, the pixidarii (commoners) were gradually reduced to de facto peasants. Under Stephen Bathory, in the 16th century, pixidarii were no longer exempt from paying taxes, barred from becoming elected officials and could be forced to work as serfs, de jure completing this process. After Hungary came under Habsburg rule, Holy Roman Emperor Leopold I in his 1691 Diploma Leopoldinum confirmed the validity of Transsylvanian noble titles, including the primores.

== Etymology ==
The word 'primor' is postulated to have come from Latin primus, or 'first', possibly as 'the first in line of battle'.

== Legal status ==
The still valid 1947 Statute IV regarding the abolition of certain titles and ranks abolished all titles of Hungarian aristocracy, specifically including primor. It is currently prohibited in the Republic of Hungary to use the title.

Before the Communist era, the royal minister of internal affairs regulated the use of the title of primor. One was legally considered a primor, if one could prove to be a direct descendant of a family that was considered part of the high Székely aristocracy in 1713 or before, or could provide a princely diploma granting status into high Székely aristocracy to one of his proven direct ancestors.

== Families holding the title ==
Among families holding the primor title are:

- Apor family (Apor de Altorja, Apor de Zalán)
- Pállfy family (Pállfy ab Erdőd)
- Mikes family (Mikes de Zabola)
- Kálnoki family (Kálnoki de Köröspatak)
- Andrássy family (Andrássy von Csikszentkirály)
- Bocskai family
- Csoma family (Csoma de Gelencze / Gelence)
