= Imper =

Imper may refer to:

- A village in Plăieșii de Jos commune, Romania
- An abbreviation for imperative mood in grammar
