= Apor =

Apor is a Hungarian name. In older sources, the name is sometimes spelled Opour, Opor or Upor. It can refer to:

- Apor (chieftain), a 10th-century Hungarian tribal leader
- Apor family, a family of ancient Transylvanian and Hungarian nobility (named Apor von Altorja, Apor von Zalán)
- Apor Péc (died 1307), Hungarian baron and landowner
