= Cașinu =

Cașinu may refer to one of two villages in Romania:

- Cașinu Mic, a village in Sânzieni Commune, Covasna County
- Cașinu Nou, a village in Plăieșii de Jos Commune, Harghita County
