= Csoma family =

Csoma of Zágon
- Székely noble family
- Arms granted to Nicolas Csoma of Gelence
- Earlier spellings: Tsoma; Czoma; Choma
- Origin: Zagon, Orbaiszék, Transylvania
- Titles: Primipilus
- Members: Sándor Kőrösi Csoma
- Connected families: Csoma of Gelence (Ghelința)
- Traditions: Reformed Christianity
- Heirlooms: Csoma of Zágon Family Archive
- Estates: Zagon; Păpăuți; Chiuruș; Covasna
- Properties: Barti–Csoma House
- Cadet branches: Csoma of Kőrös (Chiuruș)

The Csoma (Hungarian: [ˈt͡ʃomɒ]) family of Zágon and Kőrös (today Zagon and Chiuruș, Covasna County, Romania) is a prominent Calvinist Székely Primipilus family from the Orbaiszék region of Székely Land, an ethno-cultural region in Transylvania, Romania. The most famous member of the family is Alexander Csoma de Kőrös, the founder of Tibetology. The family is documented in Hungarian genealogical literature, and continues to be disputed by the worldwide-known scholar's biographers. There are

numerous other Csoma families in Transylvania and Hungary, but the extent of their kinship with this family is disputed.

== Etymology ==
The name Csoma appeared in written sources within the Kingdom of Hungary as early as the 13th century, in the forms Chom, Choma and Chamma, among the people of the Tihany Abbey.

The name Csoma appeared both as a given name and as a surname. Numerous place names throughout historical Hungary were derived from these.

There is no consensus in the scholarly literature regarding the origin of the name. There are numerous theories explaining the origin of the name. According to one theory, the name is of Italian origin and is a family name derived from the Latin word cyma, which denotes a characteristic meaning “stocky” or “stubby,” like a tree stump.

According to a previously more widely accepted explanation, the name derives from the word “csuma,” which entered the Hungarian language from neighboring Slavic languages and is a colloquial term for the plague. It appears in sources in the form “csuma taking someone away” which refers to the plague taking someone away.

According to another alternative theory, the name Csoma became established through the alternation of the sounds 'a' and 'o' from the form Csama, and its origin can be traced to the Turkish word çam, which means “pine.”

Alternative spellings of the name in historical sources: Czoma, Czioma, Choma, Chioma, Chomay, Tsoma, Tsioma.

== Origins ==
József Pálmay, a Hungarian genealogist in his work from 1900, regarded Nicolas Csoma of Gelence as the progenitor of the Csoma family; Nicolas had been granted a coat of arms and a letter of nobility in 1576 by Stephen Báthory Prince of Transylvania. In their latest researches, Sándor Debreczy (1938) and László Szilágyi (1942) traced the origins of Alexander Csoma de Kőrös from the Csoma family of Zágon. Further research has also shown that the ancestors of the Csoma family of Zágon were already living in Zagon at the same time as Nicolas Csoma was granted estates in Gelence – Stephen and Melchior Csoma of Zágon were two freeholders, who testified in 1562 in a land dispute against the Saxons of Brassó.

== Csoma of Zágon ==
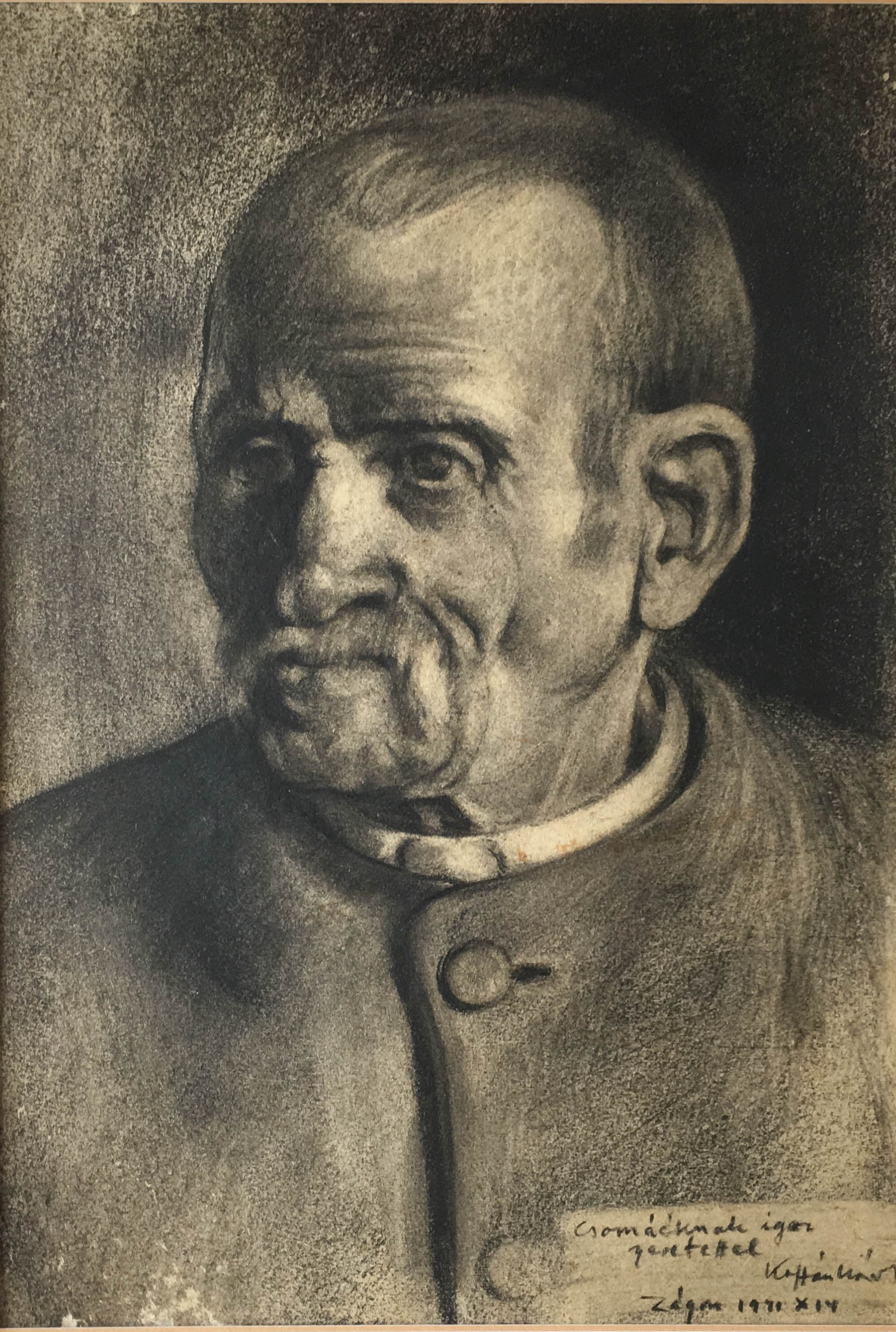
Ferenc Csoma (1870—1945) retired royal customs officer. Charcoal drawing by Károly Koffán.

In the military census compiled by Giorgio Basta in 1602, Matthew Csoma, Andreas Csoma, Christian Csoma, Valentinus Csoma, and David Csoma are listed as free soldiers in Zagon. In 1614, another census was conducted; in addition to the soldiers, the serfs were also counted. In Zágon, Stephen Csoma, Jacob Csoma, Michael Csoma, and Christian Csoma were soldiers; Matthew Csoma, Peter Csoma, and Gregory Csoma were freeholders; Andreas Csoma, Peter Csoma, Anthony Csoma, John Csoma, Michael Csoma, Nicolas Csoma, Stephen Csoma, and Michael Csoma were serfs.

One branch of the family rose to the rank of primipilus in the middle of the 17th century. In 1683, George Csoma and his three sons were infantrymen, while Andreas Csoma’s son, George Csoma, and his son – as well as John Csoma and his two sons, were primipilii

In 1713, Andreas and John Csoma, as primipilii – and Stephen and Matthew Csoma, as infantrymen, swore an oath of allegiance to the emperor Charles VI.

In 1750 John Csoma, Stephen Csoma senior, Stephen Csoma junior, Andreas Csoma senior and Andreas Csoma junior were mentioned in the conscriptions.

In the 18th century, the Csoma family of Zágon was represented by the two sons of Stephen Csoma senior: John and Stephen junior. John Csoma ultimately were disinherited from the family due to an argument with their father.

== Csoma of Kőrös ==
The first ancestor of this branch of the family was Csoma Balázs, who was born in Zágon, and settled down in Kőrös with two of his sons.

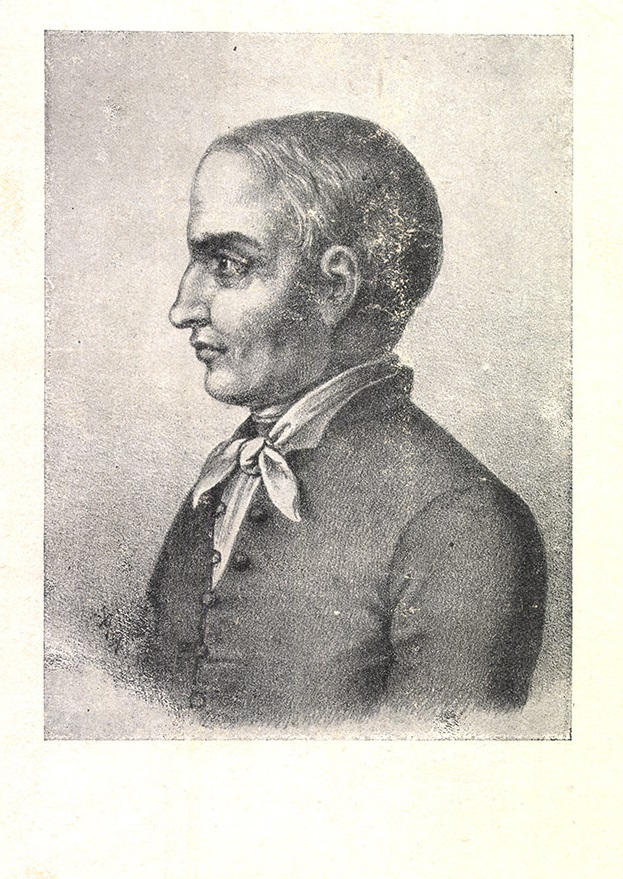
Alexander (Sándor) Csoma of Kőrös, portrait by Alajos Rohn, 1846.

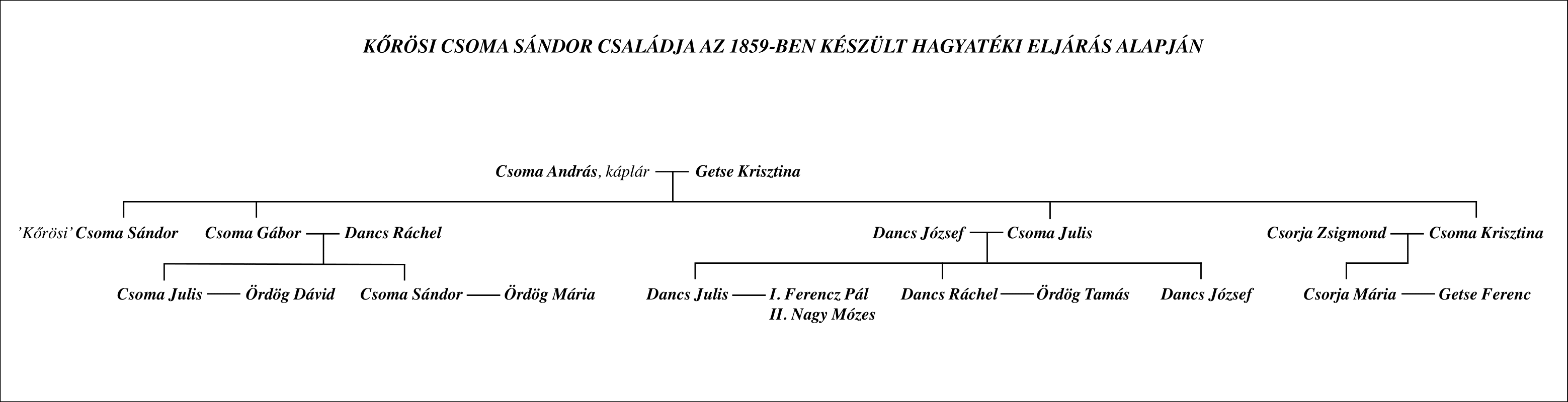
Family members named in the probate proceedings of Alexander Csoma de Kőrös in 1859.

== Coat of Arms ==
There are no concrete historical written sources indicating that the Csoma families of Zágon and Kőrös were granted a letter of nobility bearing a coat of arms. At the same time, there is no evidence showing the use of seals by individual family members that would allow a specific coat of arms to be associated with the family. Regardless, the privileges of the Szekler nobility permitted the free use of coats of arms, which allowed for the personal use of any coat of arms or emblem.

Coat of Arms of the Csoma Family

Genealogical literature, nonetheless, emphasizes the kinship between the Csoma families of Gelence and Zágon. It was on the basis of this kinship that a family history tradition emerged linking the 1577 coat of arms of Miklós Csoma of Gelence to Sándor Kőrösi Csoma and his family.

The renowned Hungarian heraldist, József Sebestyén de Keöpecz, stated that "Although we cannot prove through official documents that Alexander Csoma de Kőrös is the direct descendant [of Miklós Csoma of Gelence], his courage, his tenacious willpower in overcoming every obstacle and suffering, and his diligence make a blood relationship between the two highly probable."

On September 6, 1577, in Malbork, King Stephen Báthory of Poland and Prince of Transylvania granted nobility to Corporal Miklós Csoma of Gelence for his military merits not only in Transylvania but especially in Poland, bestowing upon him the following coat of arms: Scutum videlicet triangulare coelestini coloris, in quo serpens alatus regio diademate insignitus, hiantibus faucibus caput pueri callotenis continere conspicitur, supra scutum galea militaris clausa est posita, ex qua laciniae sive lemnisci rubei, coelestini et albi coloris defluentes, utramque scuti partem ambiunt et exornant.

Heraldist József Sebestyén pointed out that the coat of arms depicting a winged serpent swallowing a child bears a striking resemblance to the coat of arms of Bona Sforza, the mother of Queen Isabella Jagiellon of Hungary. The coat of arms of the Visconti and Sforza families is, in fact, a biscione devouring a man.

== Family heritage ==
=== Built heritage ===
==== Alexander Csoma de Kőrös Memorial House in Chiuruș ====
The house where Sándor Kőrösi Csoma was born is believed to have burned down when he was still a child. As early as 1934, there were plans to build a replica of the original house that would serve as a memorial; according to the plans at the time, it was to be built in Sfântu Gheorghe or Ciuruș. The cornerstone of the house was finally laid in 1991. The main organizer of the initiative was the Sándor Kőrösi Csoma Association in Covasna. Support came from many parts of the world, including Canada and Australia. The Csoma Memorial House is open to visitors today.

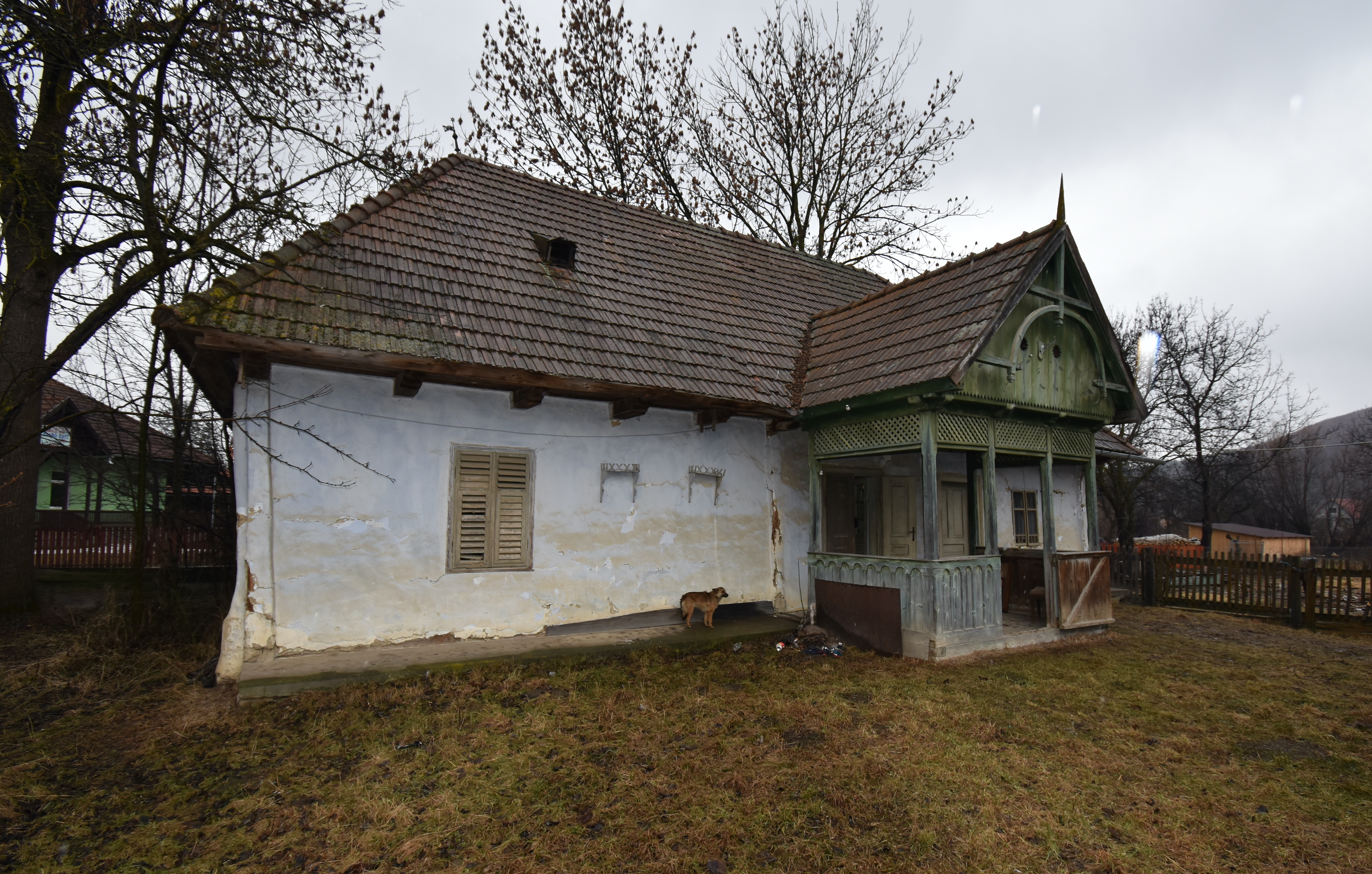
Joseph Csoma's Farmhouse in Zágon, 2025.

==== Barti–Csoma House in Zagon ====
The Barti–Csoma House is a farmhouse built by Joseph Csoma in 1816. Joseph Csoma was a prominent member of the village community and served as chief administrator of the Reformed Parish of Zágon from 1813 to 1828. During his tenure, the church and education began to flourish, and the church and parsonage took on their present form. It was during this time that he had the representative noble residence built for himself and his family.

The building is of significant local historical value and is the family’s only surviving example of its original architectural heritage. Despite this, it is not listed as a historic monument and is falling into disrepair.

=== Intangible heritage ===
==== Csoma Archive of the Library of the Hungarian Academy of Sciences ====
Alexander Csoma de Kőrös was the first to interpret the cultural heritage of the Tibetan people to Europe. He compiled the first Tibetan-English Dictionary of scientific value together with a Grammar of the Tibetan Language (1834). With his scholarly work he became the founder of Tibetan studies, a new discipline of Oriental studies. His personal collection of manuscripts and his book collection are preserved at the Hungarian Academy of Sciences. The Csoma Archive is part of the world's documentary heritage as it was registered to the UNESCO Memory of the World Programme in 2009.

==== The Csoma family archives from Zagon ====
The 18th–20th-century correspondence collection of the Csoma family of Zágon contains documents of historical and genealogical value. Part of the collection, which comprises the documents of several generations, is available for online research. The collection is privately owned.
