= Apor family =

Family of ancient Hungarian nobility

House of Apor
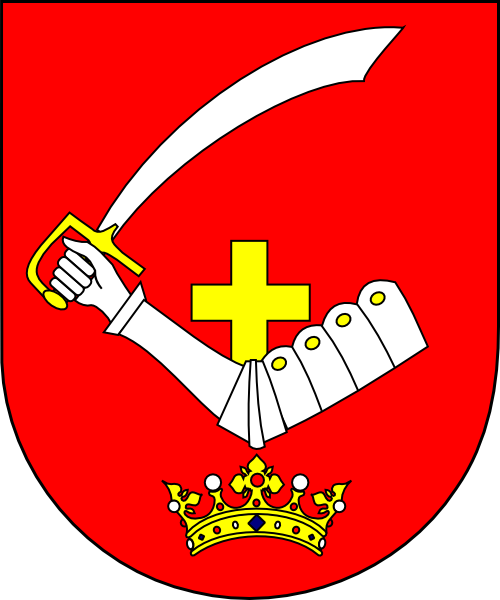
- Country: Kingdom of Hungary; Principality of Transylvania
- Origin: Hungarian, Székely
- Founded: Unknown (before written sources)
- Founder: Unknown (according to historian Peter Apor: Hungarian tribal chieftain Apor)
- Titles: primor, baron, count, vajda (voivode), rabonbán (allegedly)
- Estates: Formerly: Bálványos Castle Currently: Altorja, Szentivánlaborfalva
- Dissolution: Currently two living branches: Apor de Altorja (carrying title báró) Apor de Zalán (in origin also from Altorja, carrying title primor)

The Apor family (different branches styled altorjai or zaláni) is a family of ancient Hungarian nobility, which played a major role in Transylvanian history. It has several branches, which held different ranks over the years, including primor (the highest rank of Székely nobility, comparable to baron or count), and the Westernised titles of báró (baron) and gróf (count).

== History ==
The exact origins of the family are subject to debate. Traditionally, the Apors claim descent from the Hungarian chieftain Apor, known for having laid siege to Constantinople. Transylvanian historian Baron Peter Apor de Altorja (1676–1752) claims such descent. In addition, acknowledging that no surviving written sources explicitly state so, he proposes that Apor was a legitimate son of Hungary's Grand Prince Árpád. In Transylvanian folklore, the family is assumed to have been rabonbáns, ancient rulers of the Székely people, who resisted conversion to Christianity for several centuries after King Stephen I had banned the original Hungarian pagan religion. Already during this time, the Apor family inhabited a fortress in Bálványos (the name itself meaning "idolatrous", referring to the Apors' beliefs).

From the XVth century, the family's genealogy is well-documented in written sources. The family abandoned their fortress in Bálványos, and moved to Torja some time during the 16th century. From this residence stems the style altorjai (Latin: Apor de Altorja; German: Apor von Altorja, both meaning "of Lower Torja"). In 1506, István Apor was still referenced as living in Bálványos. It was probably his son András who subsequently moved to Torja, where he spawned ten children. One of them, Lázár Apor, was alkirálybiró for Kézdiszék, whereas another, István, became the richest man in Transylvania and had numerous official royal functions - both civil and military. István gained the báró title in on the 1st of May, 1693, and later the gróf title on February 23, 1696, but with him, the gróf branch of the Apor family died without heirs. The currently surviving báró branch gained its title on January 13, 1713. The zaláni branch split off the rest of the family during the 17th century, after the failed Thököly uprising. During the Battle for Zernyest, a young surviving Apor family member moved to Zalán and founded this branch with Székely Judit. - they style themselves zaláni (Latin: Apor de Zalán; German: Apor von Zalán).

== Famous family members ==
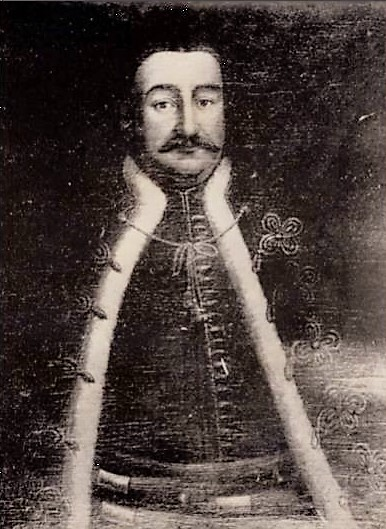
Count Apor István (1638–1704), treasurer and chief military general of Transylvanie

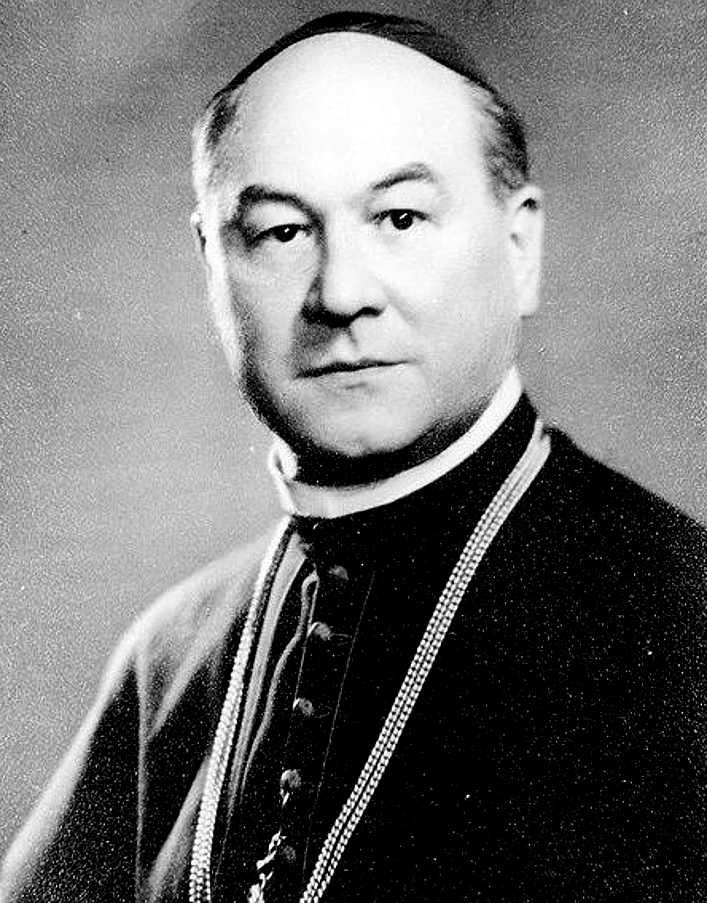
Baron Apor Vilmos, beatified bishop, patron saint of (amongst others) victims of sexual abuse and activists

- István Apor (1638–1704) treasurer, then chief general of Transylvania, he was granted the title of count in 1696, but he had no descendants
- Péter Apor (1676–1752) főkirálybíró (chief royal judge, a major administrative title) in Háromszék, historian
- Károly Apor (1815–1885) politician, president of the then-highest court of Transylvania
- Gábor Apor (1851–1898) főispán (count) of Nagy-Küküllő vármegye, Secretary of State for foreign affairs.
- József Apor (1823–1899), officer in the 1848–1849 Hungarian Revolution, jailed by the Habsburgs in Arad for his participation in the 1853-1854 Makk-Váradi resistance movement. A miniature portrait of him during his captivity (by Rákóczi) remains in the Szekler National Museum
- Vilmos Apor (1892–1945) beatified Bishop of Győr
- László Apor (1896-1982), successful businessman of the interwar period, dealing chiefly in mineral waters. From 1951, he was taken prisoner by the then-communist government of Romania and sent to a labour camp in Dobruja

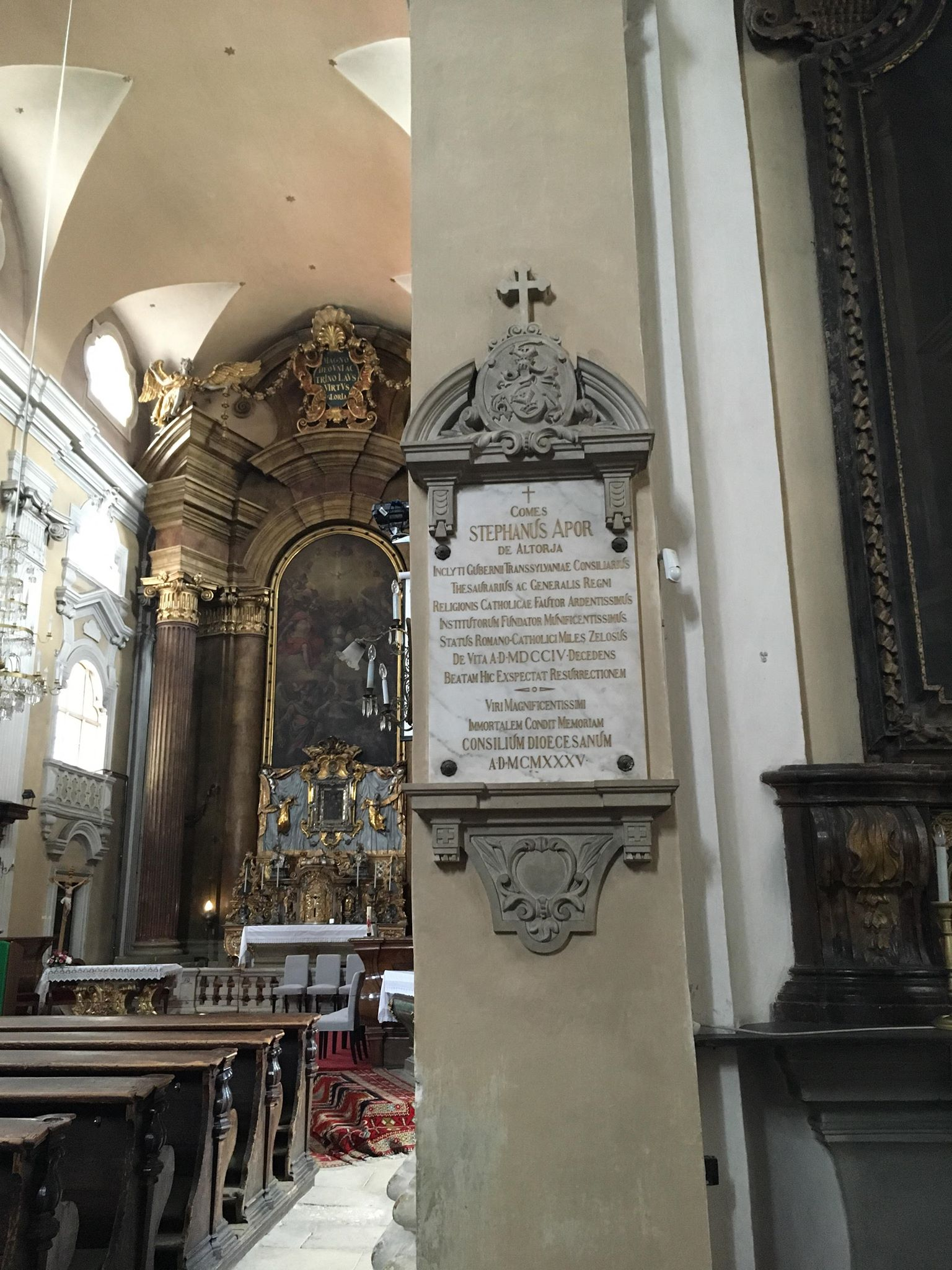
Memorial plaque of count Apor István in the Piarist Church of Kolozsvár/Cluj.

== Estate ==
The family had multiple estates in Transylvania, including in Torja, in Háromszék, and in Abosfalva. The zaláni branch of the Apor family similarly had multiple estates, including those in Zalán and Szentivánlaborfalva. Their current descendants re-acquired the manor in Szentivánlaborfalva after the Communist regime's fall in 1989.

== In literature ==
Apor family members are the main protagonists in Jókai Mór's novel "Bálványosvár" (Fortress of Idols). The novel tells a Székely legend about how Szilamér Apor, the son of rabonbán Opour (Apor) Kevend, fell in love with Mike Imola, the daughter and only child of the head of the Mike family. The Apors, at the time, were still pagans, whereas the Mike had already converted to Christianity. Of course, a marriage was out of the question. In an impulse, Szilamér decides to kidnap the girl and a major armed conflict threatens to break out as a result. In the end, the Apors decide to convert to Christianity, making a consensual marriage possible and averting war at the very last moment.

== In music ==
Apor Lázár táncza ('Lázár Apor's dance'), a 17th-century Hungarian dance, is named after primor Lázár Apor, royal judge-administrator (alkirálybiró) of Kézdiszék county. It is one of the oldest surviving pieces of Hungarian music. (score on Hungarian wiki) (video fragment on YouTube).

== See also ==
- Apor Péc

== Sources ==
- Révai nagy lexikona
- Apor de Altorja family
- Dr. Vitéz Ákosfalvi Szilágyi László: Székely Primor családok
- Pálmáy József: Háromszék Nemes családjai, Charta, Sepsiszentgyörgy, 2000.
- Oláh-Gál Elvira beszélgetése az Apor-nővérekkel, Székelyföld (cultural magazine), 2013.
