= Primipilus =

Primipilus may refer to:

- Primus pilus, the senior centurion of the first cohort in a Roman legion
- Primipilus (social status), a social status common among the Székelys living in Hungary and Transylvania
