= Pârâul Întunecat =

Pârâul Întunecat may refer to:

- Pârâul Întunecat, a tributary of the Turia in Covasna County
- Pârâul Întunecat, a tributary of the Mărcușa in Covasna County
- Valea Întunecoasă, a tributary of the Ozunca in Covasna County
