= Statute IV of 1947 regarding the abolition of certain titles and ranks =

Hungarian law

The Statute IV of 1947 regarding the abolition of certain titles and ranks (Hungarian: 1947. évi IV. törvény egyes címek és rangok megszüntetéséről) a law still in force in the Republic of Hungary, declares the abolition of hereditary noble ranks and related styles and titles, also putting a ban on their use.

== Contents of the Statute ==
1. § (1) of the Statute declares annulment of the Hungarian aristocratic and noble ranks, such as duke, marquis, count, baron, noble, primor, and primipilus ("lófő"). It also nullifies all permissions granted in the past to hold such titles bestowed upon a citizen by a foreign head of state.

- (2) abolishes the title of "örökös főispán" (Latin: supremus et perpetuus comes).
- (3) abolishes rank titles designated for decoration purposes [e.g. "valóságos belső titkos tanácsos" (Real Internal Privy Councillor), "titkos tanácsos" (Privy Councillor) etc.]. This point also revokes any previous bestowals of such titles.

2. § (1) prohibits the future bestowal of titles regulated as positions in the civil service to any person not in civil service. This point does not apply to regular or customary titles in the scientific and artistic life.

- (2) Prohibits the future appointment of persons not employed in the municipal civil service to honorary office-holders.

3. § (1) prohibits the use of rank titles mentioned in 1. §. Furthermore, it explicitly forbids the use of the "vitéz" ("valiant") title (a hereditary title created by Miklós Horthy in 1920).

- (2) prohibits the use of nobiliary particles, coats of arms, insignias or the use of any expressions referring to descent from a noble clan ("de genere").
- (3) forbids the use of honorifics referring to ranks or titles abolished by this Statute, such as "főméltóságú" (His/Her Serene Highness), "nagyméltóságú" (His/Her Excellency), "kegyelmes" (His/Her Grace), "méltóságos" (The Honourable), "nagyságos" (The Worshipful), "tekintetes", "nemzetes" etc.
- (4) prohibits the use of honorifics regulated as referring to positions in the civil service, or of those denoting social distinction [examples given here are the same as in 3. § (3)].
- (5) declares that paragraphs 3 and 4 does not apply to titles regular in international communication. These paragraphs also do not apply to the exclusively ecclesiastic, non-secular titles of the clergy.

4. § states that the Statute is in effect as of the day of its enactment. The original version of the Statute names the Minister of Internal Affairs (in accordance with the Minister of Justice) as the minister responsible for the execution of the legislation. The version in force today gives this duty to the minister responsible for matters concerning the vital records.

== After 1989 ==
The Statute survived the political change after the fall of the single-party system and the ongoing deregulation processes during and after the 1990s (see for example Statute LXXXII of 2007), and it is still in force today. Multiple attempts have been made to have the Statute revoked, but none of them have succeeded. The situation has not changed with and since the entry into force of the new Constitution of Hungary in 2012.

In 2009 the Constitutional Court rejected a motion requesting the revocation of 3. § (1) – (4), the ban of using certain titles. Commenting on the rejection, the Constitutional Court felt it

... necessary to add that the Statute serves the abolition of discrimination of people on the basis of descent, which, as the ministerial rationale of the bill conveys, "can not be compatible with the democratic public and social arrangement standing on the basis of equality. Thus, the Statute is supported by such a definite system of values that is consonant with, moreover, is an integral part of the values derived from paragraph 70/A. § (1) of the Constitution in force, prohibiting discrimination.

On September 27, 2010 (nearing the finish of the campaign for the municipal elections) István Tarlós (at the time running for the seat of Mayor of Budapest, nominated by the governing party Fidesz) and Zsolt Semjén (Deputy Prime Minister of Hungary, Christian Democratic People's Party, also member of the government), among many other politicians, were initiated into the Order of Vitéz, an act the Statute explicitly prohibits.

In December 2010 two members of the opposition party Jobbik presented a motion to revoke parts of the Statute. This motion was later withdrawn.

In March 2011, during the drafting process of a new constitution, the possibility of revoking all legislation between 1944 and 1990 was raised.

== See also ==
- Hungarian nobility
