= Apor (chieftain) =

Hungarian tribal chieftain

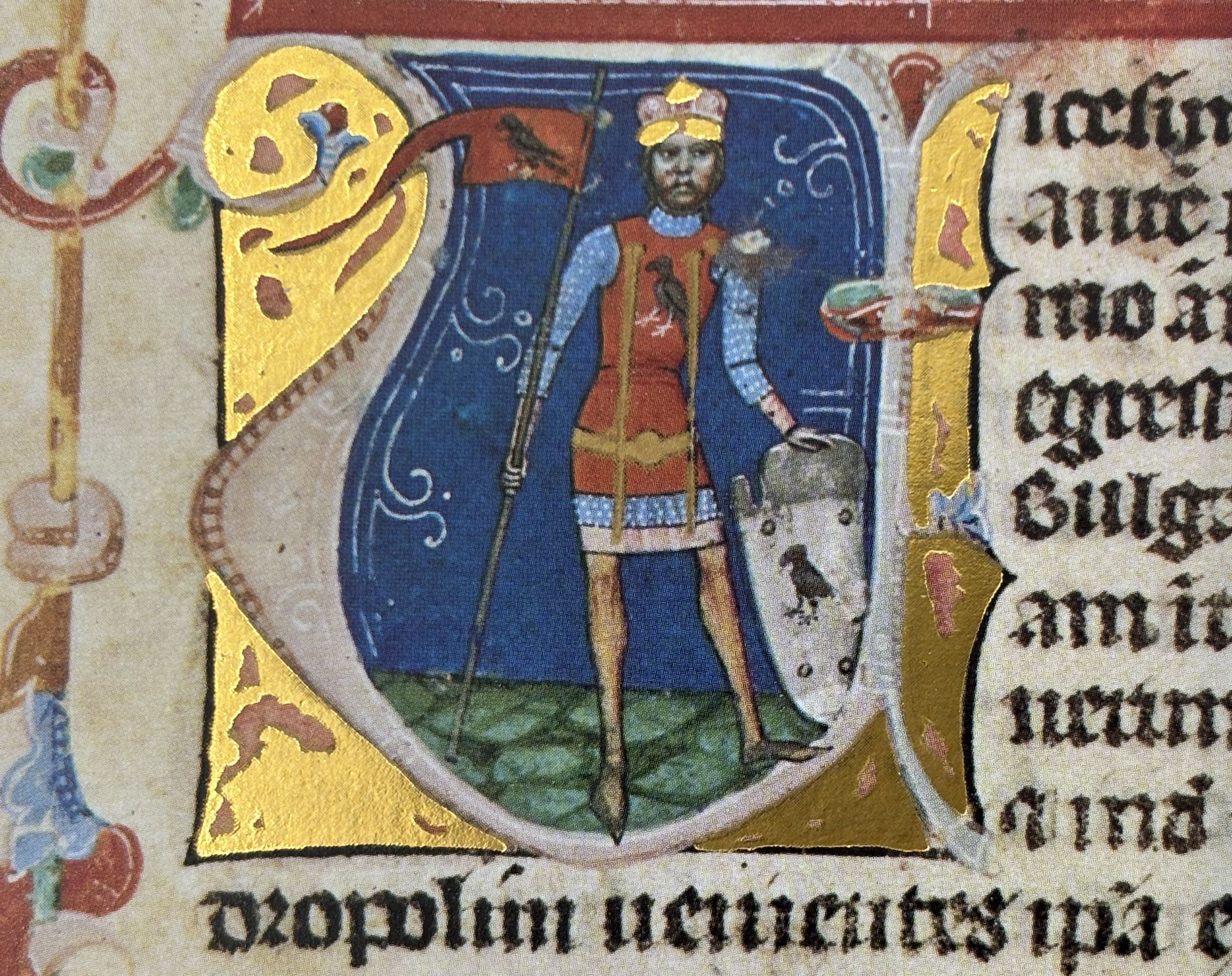
Captain Apor, the leader of the Hungarian army wears a Turul bird as a crest on his flag, shield and chest (Illuminated Chronicle)

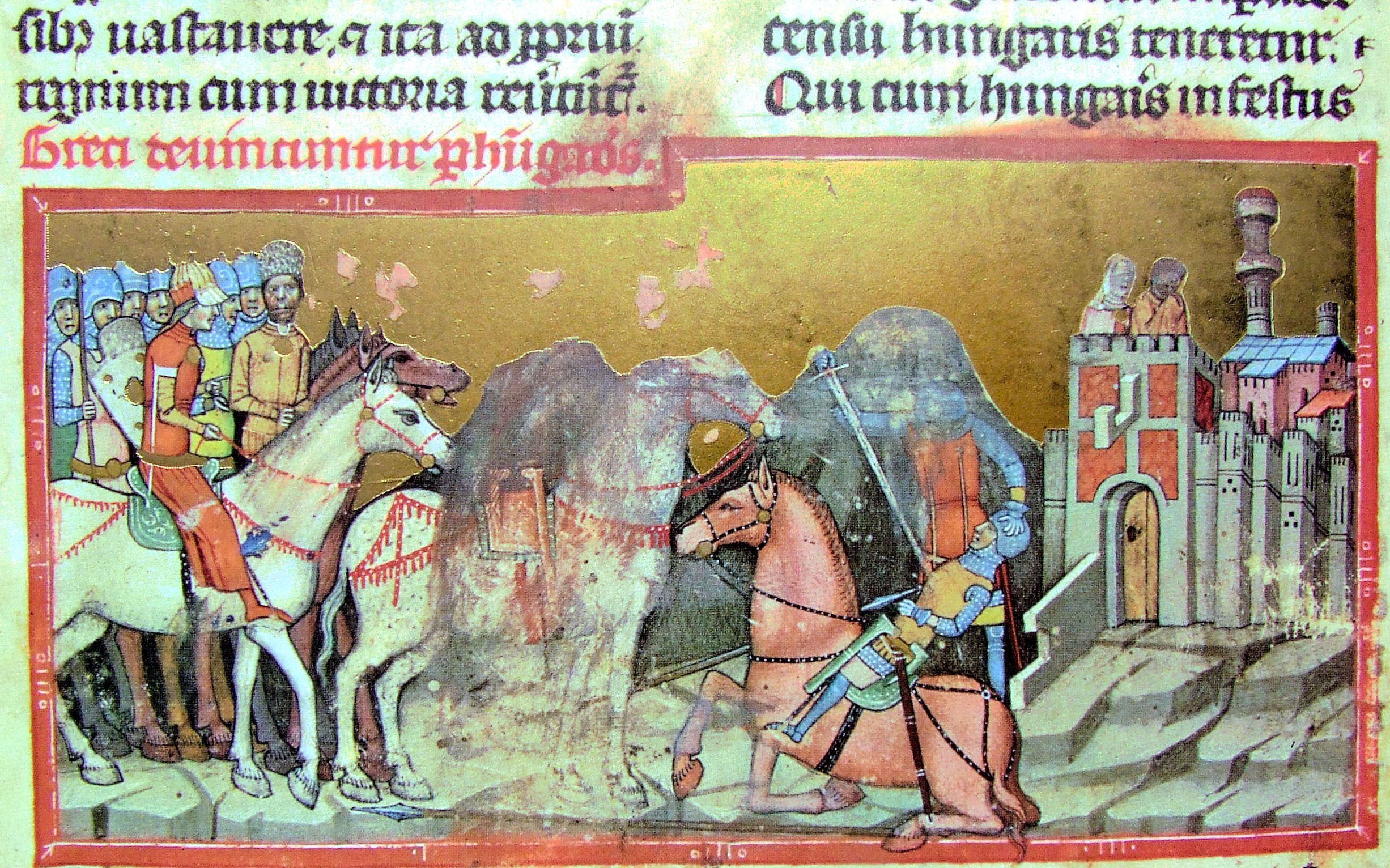
Apor, sitting on a white horse, leads the Hungarian army, while Botond duels with a Greek warrior before the walls of Constantinople. Emperor Constantine VII and his wife, Helena Lekapene watch the events over the broken city gate (Illuminated Chronicle)

Apor was a Hungarian tribal chieftain, who, according to the Illuminated Chronicle, led a campaign against the Byzantine Empire in 958 or 959, where the legend of Botond takes place. He was the ancestor of the gens Apor.

The Apor family of Transylvanian nobility traditionally trace their origins to him. In his work Lusus Mundi, 17th-18th century historian Baron Péter Apor de Altorja claims such descent. Also, acknowledging that no surviving written sources explicitly state so, he proposed that Apor was a legitimate son of Hungary's Grand Prince Árpád.
