= Vilmos Apor =

Hungarian Catholic bishop and martyr (1892–1945)

Blessed Bishop Vilmos Apor
- Bishop of Győr
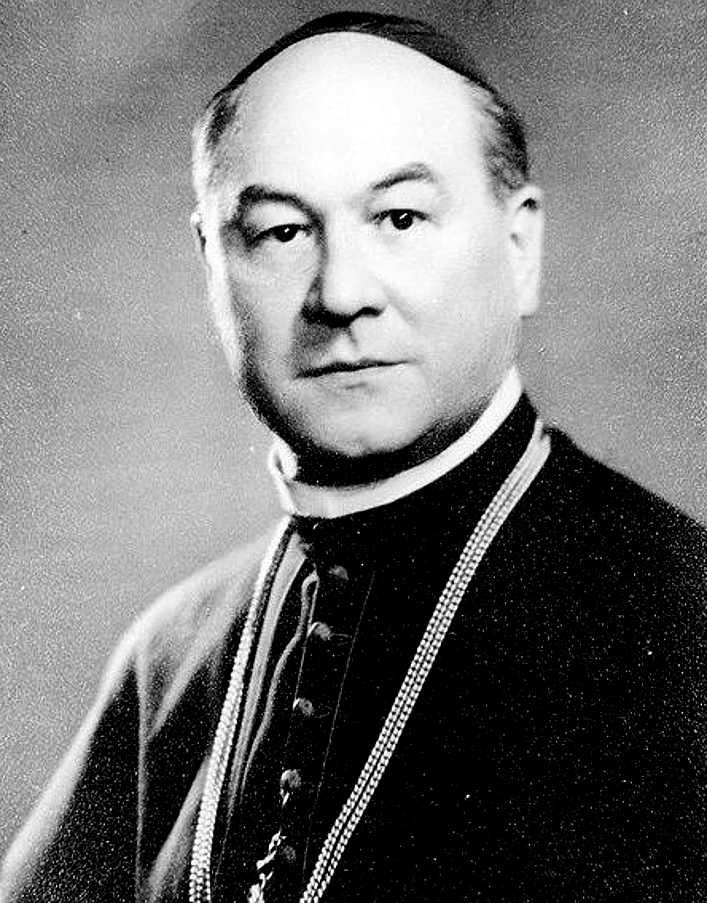
- Portrait of Apor, c. 1930
- Church: Roman Catholic Church
- Diocese: Győr
- See: Győr
- Appointed: 21 January 1941
- Installed: 2 March 1941
- Term ended: 2 April 1945
- Predecessor: István Breyer
- Successor: Károly Kálmán Papp

Orders
- Ordination: 24 August 1915 by Sigismund Waitz
- Consecration: 24 February 1941 by Jusztinián György Serédi
- Rank: Bishop

Personal details
- Born: Baron Vilmos Apor; 29 February 1892 Segesvár, Austria-Hungary (now Romania)
- Died: 2 April 1945 (aged 53) Győr, Kingdom of Hungary
- Motto: Crux firmat mitem mitigat fortem ("The Cross strengthens the meek; tames the strong")
- Coat of arms

Sainthood
- Feast day: 2 April
- Venerated in: Roman Catholic Church
- Beatified: 9 November 1997; Saint Peter's Square, Vatican City by Pope John Paul II
- Attributes: Episcopal attire; Palm
- Patronage: Abuse victims; Sexual abuse victims; Activists; Virgins; Military chaplains

Baron Vilmos Apor de Altorja (29 February 1892 – 2 April 1945) was a Hungarian Catholic prelate and bishop who became famous for protesting against the persecution of the Hungarian Jewish population and for his steadfast commitment to the poor.

Apor's outreach also extended to abuse victims with a particular emphasis on the protection of women - it would be this latter commitment that saw him sustain fatal injuries leading to his death. Apor dedicated himself to being an opponent of both communism and Nazism and used his sermons as a platform to condemn them, though coming at a great personal risk to himself. Apor was a beloved figure in his diocese, where people hailed him as a great saint upon learning of his death.

The beatification process opened on 5 March 1991 and culminated after Pope John Paul II presided over the beatification in Saint Peter's Square on 9 November 1997.

== Life ==
Vilmos Apor de Altorja was born in 1892 to the nobles Baron Gábor Apor (1851–98) and Countess Fidelia Pálffy ab Erdöd (1863–1934). His father died in his childhood due to complications from diabetes. His mother was strict but caring and imparted religious instruction to her children. He served as an altar server during his childhood and his love for the priesthood intensified such that he harbored an interest in becoming a priest himself. Bishop Miklós Széchenyi was his uncle.

Apor attended high school at a Jesuit-run school in Kalksburg where his desires to become a priest intensified further despite his initial homesickness. Apor liked Latin as well as historical studies and received outstanding marks in these subjects while a treatise on the historical Church earned him a prize; he also liked tennis and swimming. Apor then transferred to another Jesuit school at Kalocsa. He decided to begin his studies for the priesthood despite his mother's wish that he wait a little while longer - she consented at Christmas in 1909 - and the local bishop was delighted to receive him in 1910 despite the fact that Apor was not there for long. The bishop sent him to Innsbruck for further studies with the Jesuits in 1910 where he later received a doctorate in theological studies; the rector there was a relative of his. He was at the old theological institute of Nikolaihaus for a brief period before moving to the new Canisianum. Apor was made a subdeacon on 22 August 1915 and was elevated to the diaconate on 23 August.

He received his ordination to the priesthood on 24 August 1915 and he celebrated his first Mass on 25 August with his mother and sisters Henrietta and Gizella in attendance. His brother Gabor could not be there because he was on the battlefront and was unable to seek leave. Apor was first sent to Gyula on 31 August 1915 and he preached his first sermon on the following 8 September. On 27 March 1916, he opened an office for the protection of women that became a predominant focus for him on his pastoral mission while on 4 January 1917 he was sent as a chaplain to the Italian front before being transferred as such to Austria and then back to Gyula at the start of 1919 at the end of the war. Pope Pius XII appointed him as a bishop in 1941 and he later received his episcopal consecration a month later; his brother Gabor paid for his new episcopal vestments. He had received word from the papal nuncio Angelo Rotta of his appointment; the government had once recommended him to be an auxiliary bishop in 1936 and then as the Bishop of Veszprém in 1939 though both were denied. The see he was appointed to saw him as the third on the list but Pope Pius XII decided to forgo selecting the first and instead chose Apor; his appointment could have also been due to the intervention of Rotta who perhaps knew of Apor. He took formal possession of his new episcopal see on 2 March 1941. On 25 February 1941 - in a unanimous decision - the town council of Gyula made him an honorary citizen due to his commitment to its people and his strong and tireless activism. He became noted for his strong dedication to the poor and his tireless commitment to a range of social justice issues.

In summer 1944, he wrote to the Hungarian Primate Jusztinian Serédi to persuade him to take a strong stance against the government. He also appealed to the Gestapo headquarters in Berlin in an attempt to free the Jews of his diocese from the ghetto and negotiated with the Nazi command to spare the town from a siege. The introduction of racial laws sought to further make matters worse so the bishop spoke out for those affected from racial slurs and other forms of persecution. He provided supplies to those Jews being deported through his diocese and also sheltered those made homeless after air raids in the episcopal palace while he himself withdrew to a small room for himself.

In 1945, as Soviet troops reached his diocese, he offered safe haven to numerous women and children in his residence and also protected women who feared being raped. Several drunken Soviet soldiers arrived with the intention of bringing 100 women to their barracks, but Apor had them well-hidden in the cellar. He refused to give them up. All of a sudden, a girl came out of her hiding place, and the Soviets ran to her. For a moment the bishop's dramatic intervention took the Russians by surprise, and they went towards the exit. Then one of them turned back and with his machine-gun fired a series of shots. Sándor Pálffy, the bishop's seventeen-year-old nephew, jumped in front of him to protect him and was hit by three shots. The bishop, too, was hit by three bullets; one lightly grazed his forehead, the second passed through the right sleeve of his cassock, and the third, the most dangerous one, penetrated his abdomen.

Apor lent on the arms of two of his aides and walked towards the cellar with blood coming from his forehead. A doctor administered first aid and Apor's sister Gizella aided the doctor in placing her brother on a stretcher with a blanket to cover him. But getting to the hospital took longer due to checkpoints and they had to stop several times since the Soviets wanted to inspect the ambulance; the blanket had to be taken off him on these occasions so the Soviets could see there were no hidden treasure. Professors Jung and Petz - who had known Apor - performed the operation which seemed to be successful and saw a slight improvement on Holy Saturday when he received the Eucharist with his sister at his side. He thanked God for having accepted his sacrifice and for the fact that the women he protected were still safe. On Easter his condition deteriorated because an infection had set in; he made his confession and was given the Anointing of the Sick but pain increased. He remained lucid with his sister and Doctor Jung at his side in addition to the nurses and the parish priest.

He died from his injuries not long after in the afternoon of 2 April 1945. István Sándor witnessed a stretcher on 3 April being carried from the hospital and saw the bishop's remains as it was being transported. The funeral was put on hold due to conflict in the area but was carried out within a week of his death. His remains were buried in a Carmelite church; his confessor was the Carmelite priest Erno Szeghy who had served as such since 1943 or 1944. His remains were later relocated to the diocesan cathedral. Pope John Paul II visited his tomb in 1996.

== Legacy ==
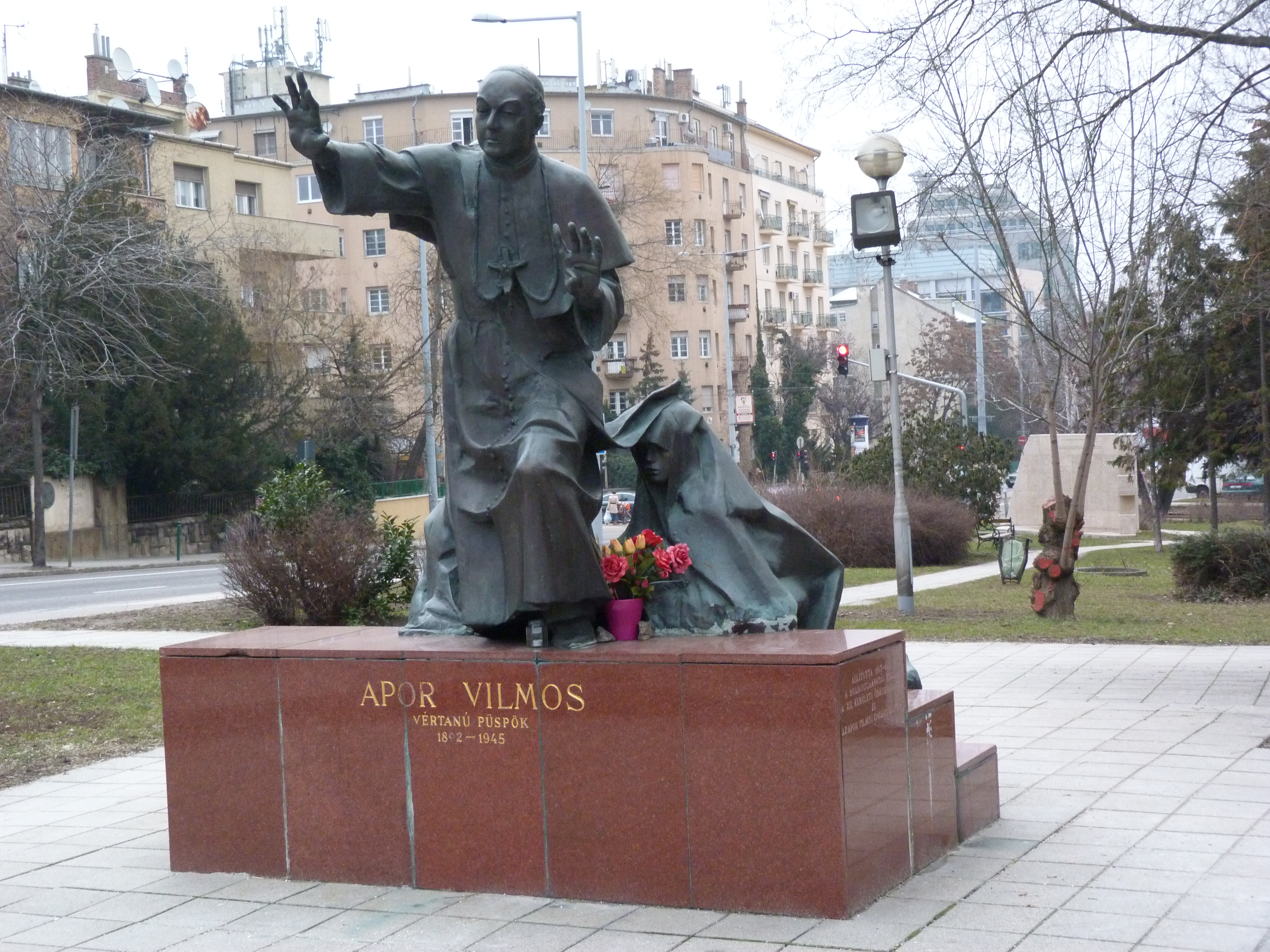
His statue in Budapest

There now stands a statue in District XII of Budapest in his honor and the place itself has been named Apor Vilmos tér according to the Hungarian standard of name order.

The theologian and cardinal-elect Hans Urs von Balthasar was his nephew.

== Beatification ==
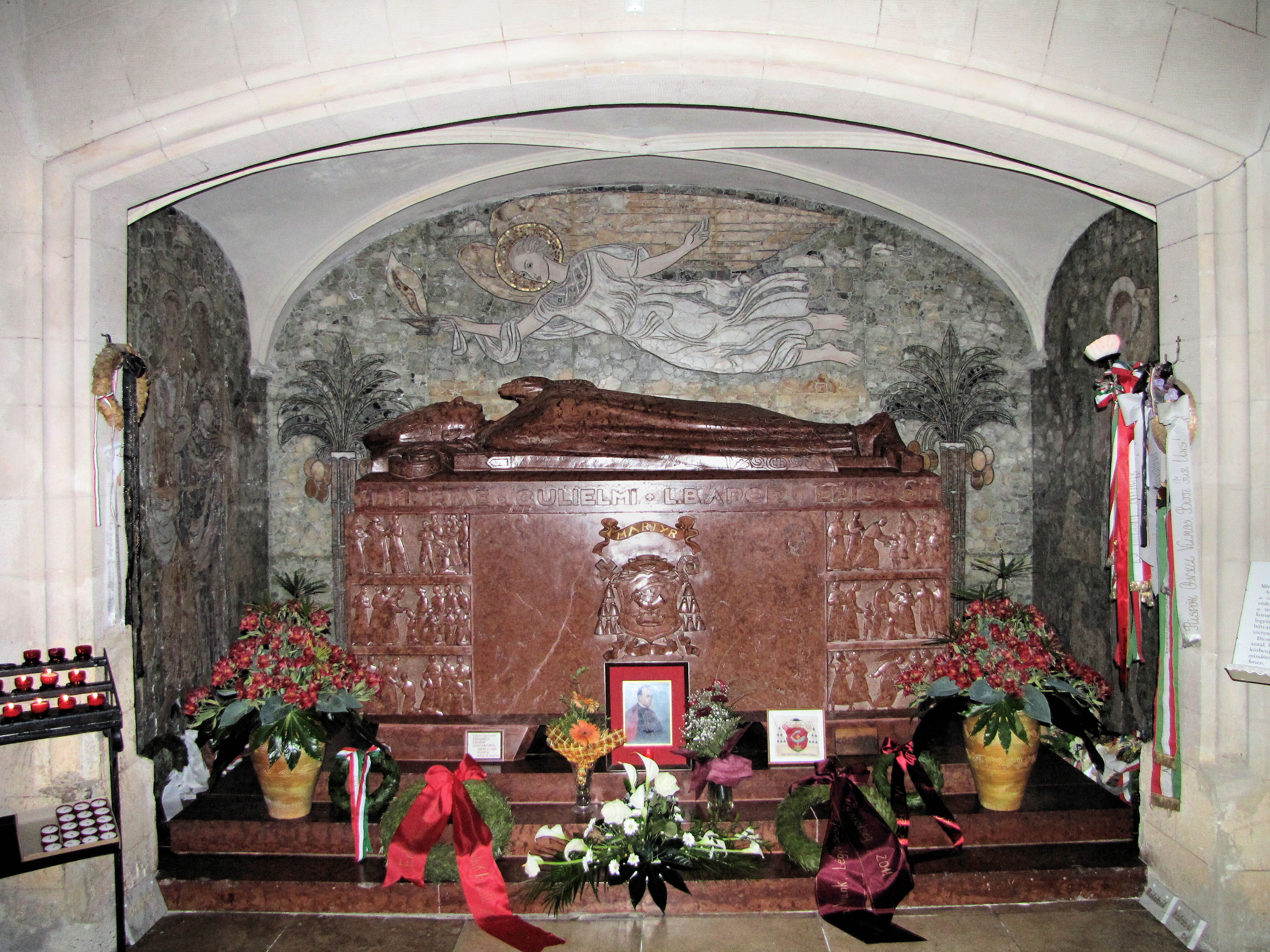
Blessed Vilmos Apor's tomb carved by the Hungarian sculptor Sándor Boldogfai Farkas (1907.–1970.).

The beatification process was held in his old diocese in a diocesan process that spanned from 1989 until 1990; the formal start came on 5 March 1991 after the Congregation for the Causes of Saints issued the official "nihil obstat" and titled the late bishop as a Servant of God. The C.C.S. later validated this process in Rome on 31 May 1991 and received the Positio dossier from the postulation in 1996. Theologians approved the cause on 3 June 1997 as did the cardinal and bishop members of the C.C.S. on 1 July 1997.

John Paul II confirmed on 7 July 1997 that Apor was killed "in odium fidei" (in hatred of the faith) and thus approved his beatification. The Pope presided over Apor's beatification on 9 November 1997 in Saint Peter's Square.

Catholic Church titles
| Preceded by István Breyer | Bishop of Győr; 1941–1945 | Succeeded by Kálmán Papp |
