= Bálványos Castle =

Coordinates: 46°06′50″N 25°57′56″E

Bálványosvár (Cetatea Balvanyos, Bálványos Castle)
- Hilltop near the Turia and Bodoc mountains, 1,056 m (3,465 ft); Near Turia (Torja), Covasna County in Romania
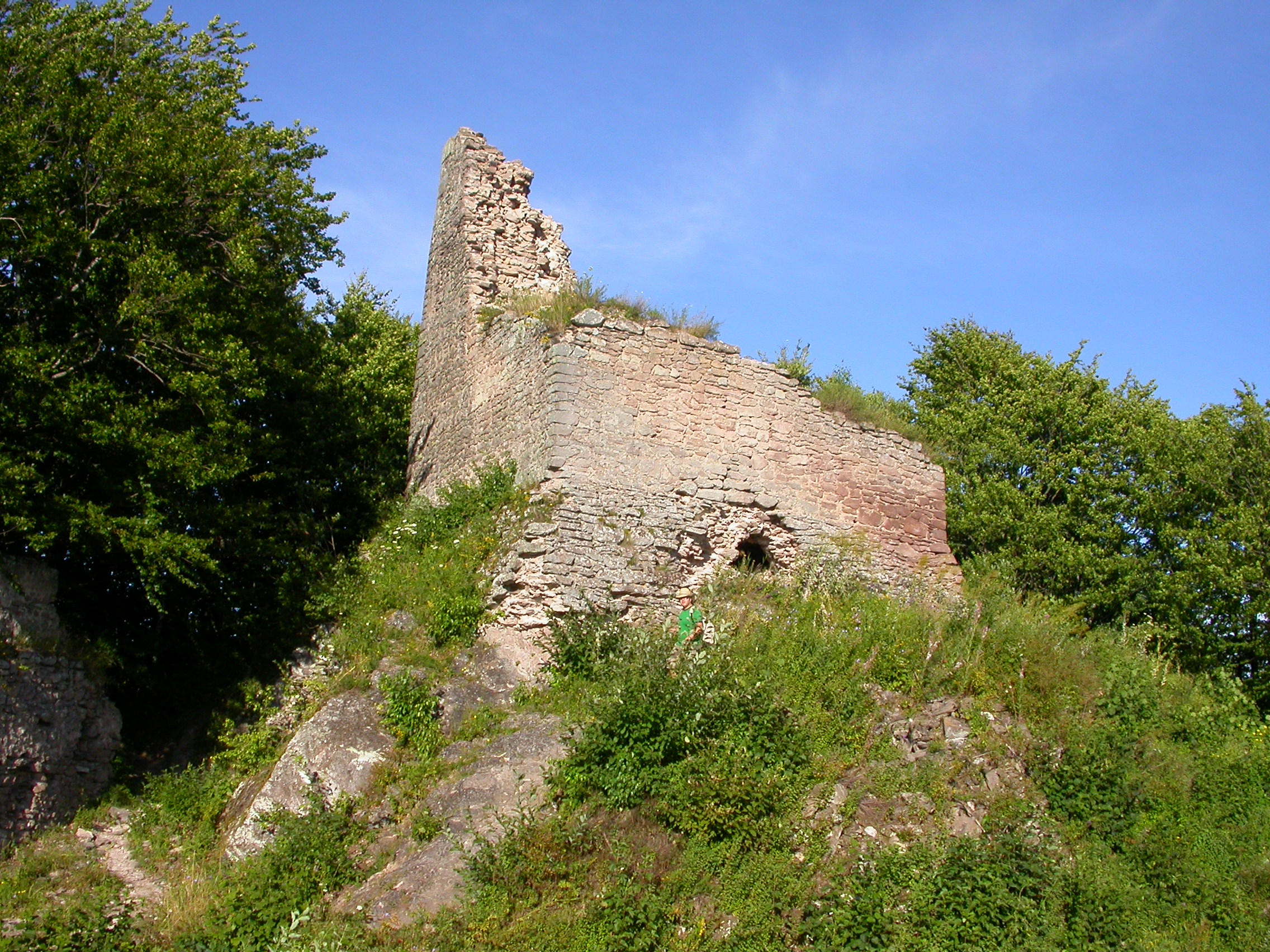
- Ruins of the central keep of Bálványos Castle

Site information
- Website: www.bailetusnad.ro/baile-balvanyos/

Garrison information
- Past commanders: Apor family

Bálványos Castle (Hungarian: Bálványosvár, Romanian: Cetatea Bálványos) is a castle ruin of national monument status, located in the north of Covasna County, Romania. As a Romanian national monument, its code is CV-II-m-A-13297. "Bálványos" in Hungarian means "idolatrous", so the name of the fortress can be loosely translated into "the Castle with/of the Idols".

== Location ==
Bálványos Castle can be found on the top of a steep hill, to the northwest of where the Turia and Bodoc mountains meet.

== Etymology ==
The castle received its name from the fact that it was one of the last holdouts of the original pagan Hungarian faith. The castle's lords, the Apor family, refused to convert to Christianity, long after the conversion of most of the rest of the country.

According to traditional tales, the Apors became Christians in the early 12th century. According to a legend, the lord's son, Apor Szilamér, wanted to marry Mike Imola, then the only child of the rival Mike family. The Mikes were already Christians at the time, making a marriage impossible. Apor Szilamér decided to kidnap the girl, provoking the anger of the Mike family, who prepared to lay siege to the castle. Imola proved to love Szilamér back, and persuaded him to convert to Christianity – making peace and a marriage between the family possible without bloodshed.

This legend became the basis for Jókai Mór's novel titled Bálványosvár.

== History ==
According to folklore, tribal chieftain Opour (Apor) built the castle during the rule of king Stephen I, in order to be able to continue practicing his pagan faith in peace. Written sources mention the castle from the 12th century onward, first under the name Baluanus, and later, in 1360, as Castrum Balwanus.

The castle had an ovoid-shaped wall, and on its northern end a quadrangular tower with cisterns below it. The castle was fortified with both an outer and an inner wall.

According to local folklore, this was the location where Otto of Bavaria, crowned King of Hungary, lost his crown to Kán (Apor) László in 1307. During the chaotic period after the extinction of House Árpád, Otto went to Transylvania to visit Kán László, allegedly to ask for the lord's daughter's hand. Kán László let the king in, but imprisoned him, also taking the Holy Crown of Hungary. This paved to way for the Angevin dynasty's coming to power in Hungary. The crown was later given to the first Angevin king, Charles Robert, but only after Papal pressure, and three years late for Charles Robert's coronation.

The castle was inhabited by the Apor family all the way up to the 17th century, until Apor László fell in the Battle for Brassó (Brasov) in 1603. After this, the family moved into a more comfortable manor in Torja. Soon after, the castle started decaying.

== Sources ==
- Földi Pál: Legendás Várak – Várak Legendái, Anno Kiadó, Budapest, 2000.
- Tekintő. Erdélyi helynévkönyv. Adattári tallózásból összehozta Vistai András János. [Hely és év nélkül, csak a világhálón közzétéve.] 1–3. kötet. https://web.archive.org/web/20110710231100/http://www.fatornyosfalunk.com/html/erdelyi_helynevkonyv.html
- Lista monumentelor istorice: Județul Covasna. Ministerul Culturii, 2015. http://patrimoniu.gov.ro/images/lmi-2015/LMI-CV.pdf
