= Cașin (Râul Negru) =

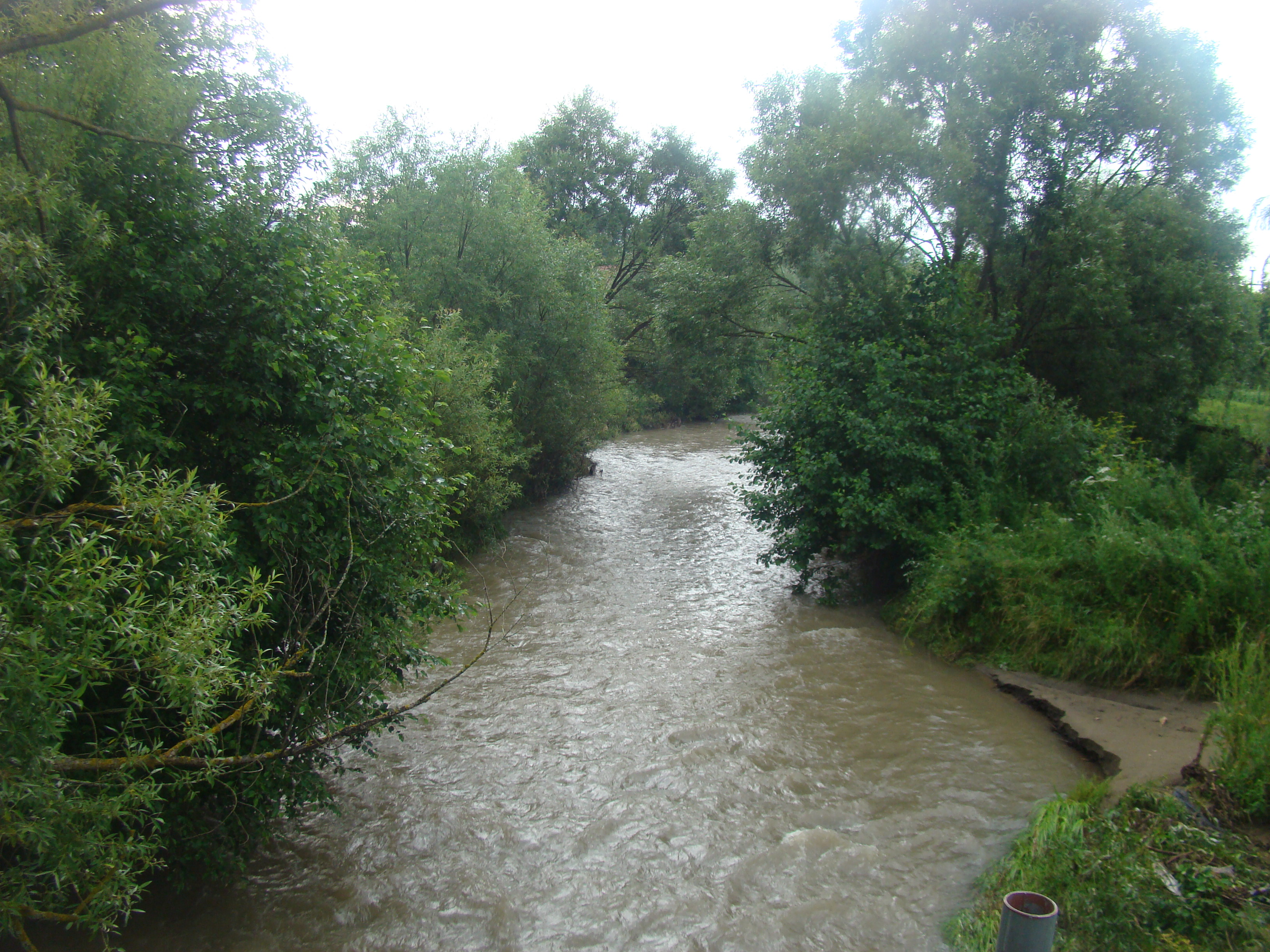

- Location within Romania

Location
- Country: Romania
- Counties: Harghita, Covasna
- Cities: Târgu Secuiesc

Physical characteristics
- Mouth: Râul Negru
  - coordinates: 45.9810°N 26.1678°E
- Length: 54 km (34 mi)
- Basin size: 482 km^{2} (186 sq mi)

Basin features
- Progression: Râul Negru→ Olt→ Danube→ Black Sea
- Tributaries
  - right: Turia

The Cașin is a right tributary of the river Râul Negru in Romania. It discharges into the Râul Negru in Catalina. It flows through the villages and towns Plăieșii de Sus, Plăieșii de Jos, Iacobeni, Valea Seacă, Sânzieni, Târgu Secuiesc and Catalina. Its length is 54 km (34 mi) and its basin size is 482 km^{2} (186 sq mi).

== Tributaries ==
The following rivers are tributaries to the river Cașin (from source to mouth):

- Left: Borviz, Cetatea
- Right: Carpen, Pârâul Primejdios, Bella, Pârâul Adânc, Valea Seacă, Cetatea de Piatră, Pârâul Văii, Turia
