= Turia (Cașin) =

Turia Torja-patak
- Location within Romania

Location
- Country: Romania
- Counties: Covasna County
- Villages: Turia, Târgu Secuiesc

Physical characteristics
- Source: near Balvanyos spa
- Mouth: Cașin
  - location: Târgu Secuiesc
  - coordinates: 46.0002°N 26.1558°E
- Length: 24 km (15 mi)
- Basin size: 127 km^{2} (49 sq mi)

Basin features
- Progression: Cașin→ Râul Negru→ Olt→ Danube→ Black Sea

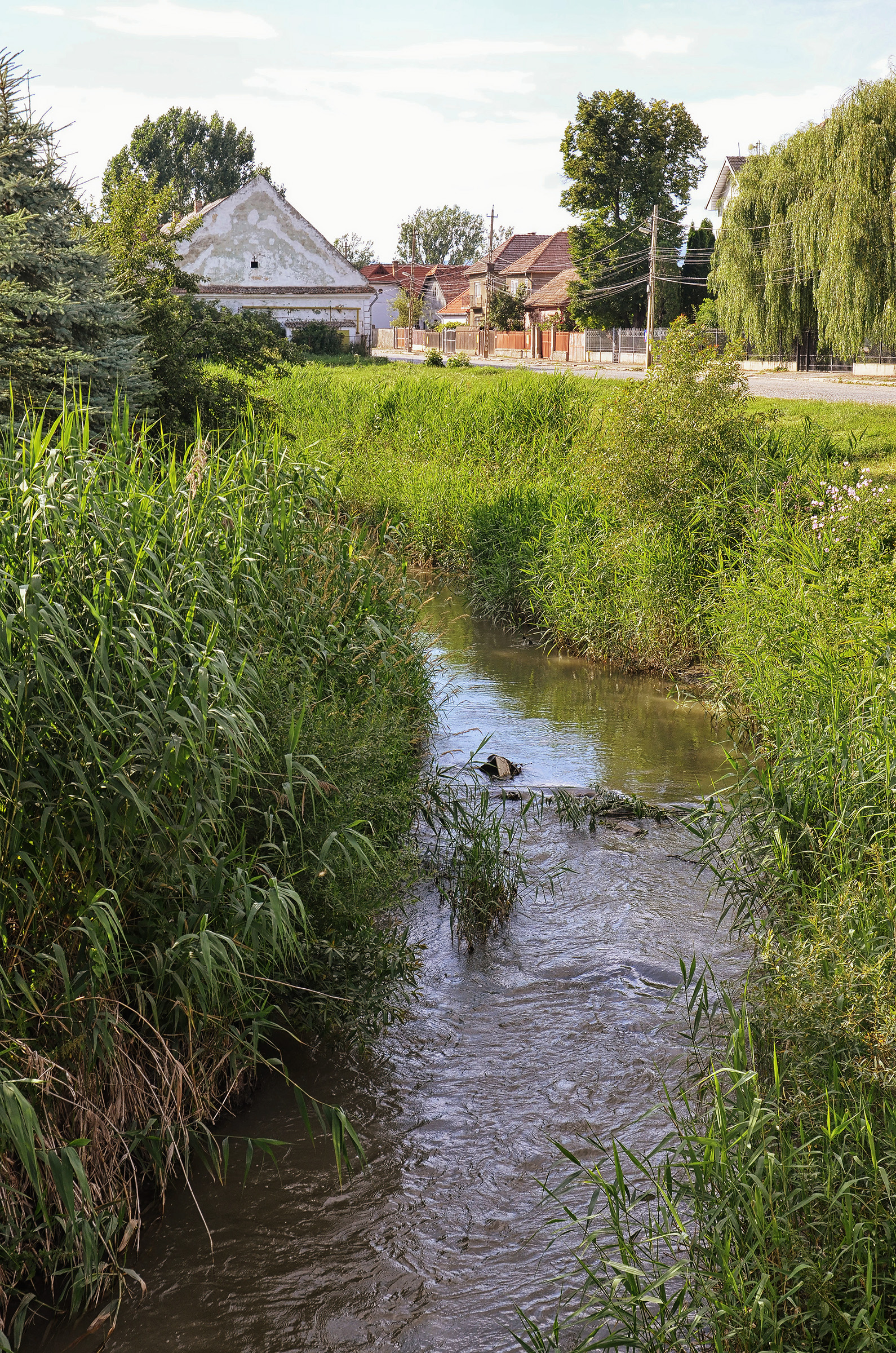
The Turia Stream in Târgu Secuiesc

The Turia (Hungarian: Torja-patak) is a right tributary of the river Cașin in Romania. It flows into the Cașin in the city Târgu Secuiesc. Its length is 24 km (15 mi) and its basin size is 127 km^{2} (49 sq mi).

== Tributaries ==
The following rivers are tributaries to the river Turia (from source to mouth):

- Left: Boroș (Valea Gorganului), Muncaci, Caratna
- Right: Pârâul Mărului, Pârâul Peștilor (Iaidon), Valea Prunilor (Pârâul Întunecat)
