= Pârâul Primejdios =

- Location within Romania

Location
- Country: Romania
- Counties: Harghita County
- Villages: Cașinu Nou

Physical characteristics
- Mouth: Caşin
  - coordinates: 46.1852°N 26.0817°E
- Length: 14 km (8.7 mi)
- Basin size: 80 km^{2} (31 sq mi)

Basin features
- Progression: Cașin→ Râul Negru→ Olt→ Danube→ Black Sea
- Tributaries
  - left: Drumul Carului, Pârâul Despletit

The Pârâul Primejdios is a right tributary of the river Cașin in Romania. The Cașin itself is a tributary of the river Râul Negru.

The Pârâul Primejdios flows into the Cașin near Iacobeni. Its length is 14 km (8.7 mi) and its basin size is 80 km^{2} (31 sq mi).
