= Balvanyos =

Coordinates: 46.1095°N 25.9586°E

Balvanyos Balvanyos (in Romanian) Bálványos (in Hungarian)
- Spa resort
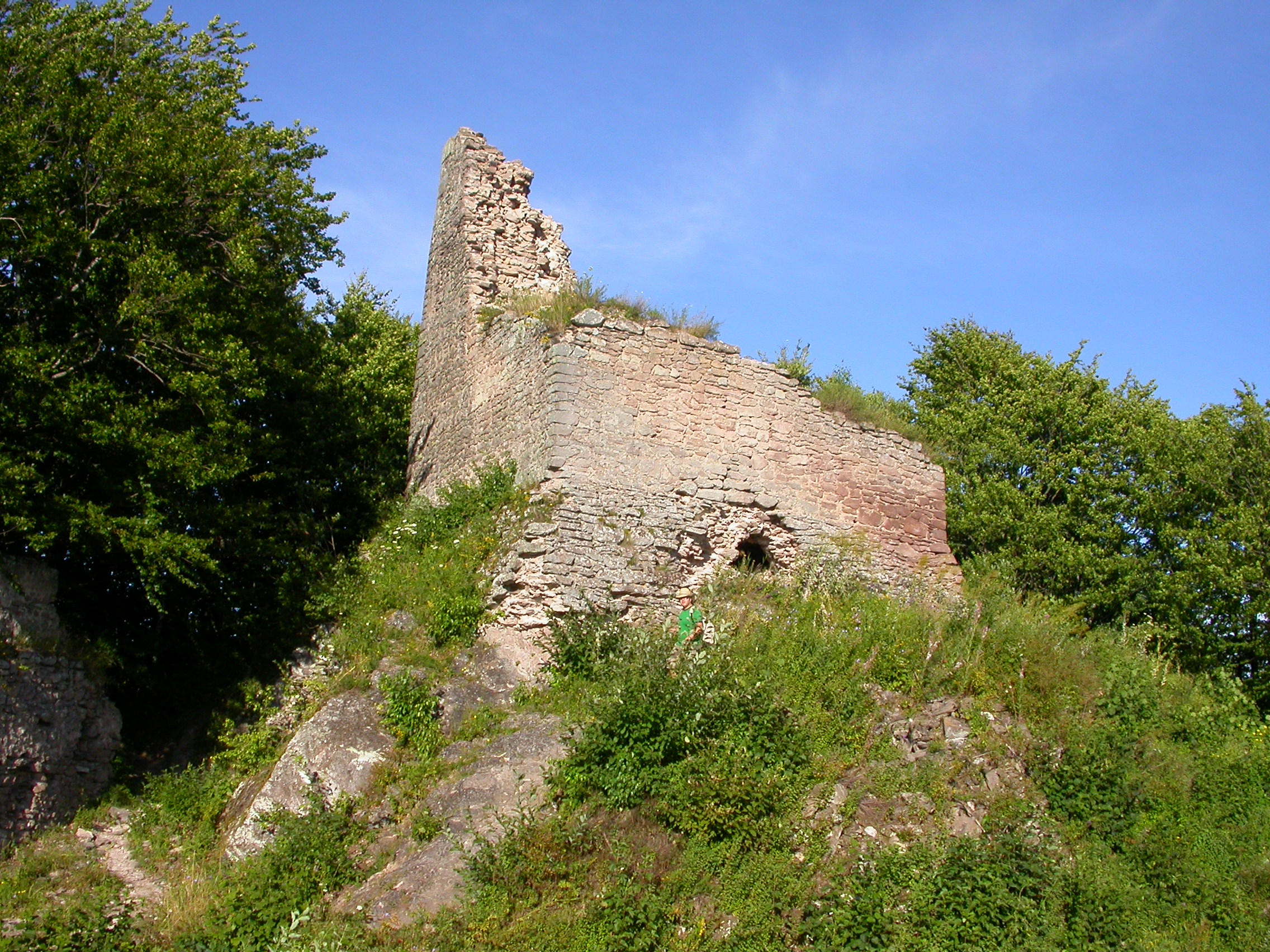
- Bálványos Fortress
- Interactive map of Balvanyos
- Country: Romania
- County: Covasna
- Commune: Turia
- Elevation: 840 m (2,760 ft)
- Time zone: UTC+2 (EET)
  - Summer (DST): UTC+3 (EEST)

Balvanyos (Hungarian: Bálványos) is a spa resort in Covasna County, in the east of Transylvania, central Romania. It lies at an altitude 840–950 m on the southern slopes of the Bodoc Mountains, some 67 km from Sfântu Gheorghe, the county's seat. The spa is located close to the ruins of the 11th century Balvanyos Citadel (Romanian: Cetatea Balvanyos, Hungarian: Bálványosvár).

The spa is one of several hydrothermal and volcanic features of the region. It lies 10 km from the Lake Sfânta Ana, which is unique in this part of Europe. A geological feature locally known as "The Birds' Cemetery" – precipice with hydrogen sulphide emanation – is also located nearby.

The spa has been known for its health properties for centuries, but has only been commercially exploited as a spa since the building in 1938 of Grand Hotel Balvanyos, a 4 star hotel.

== Gallery ==
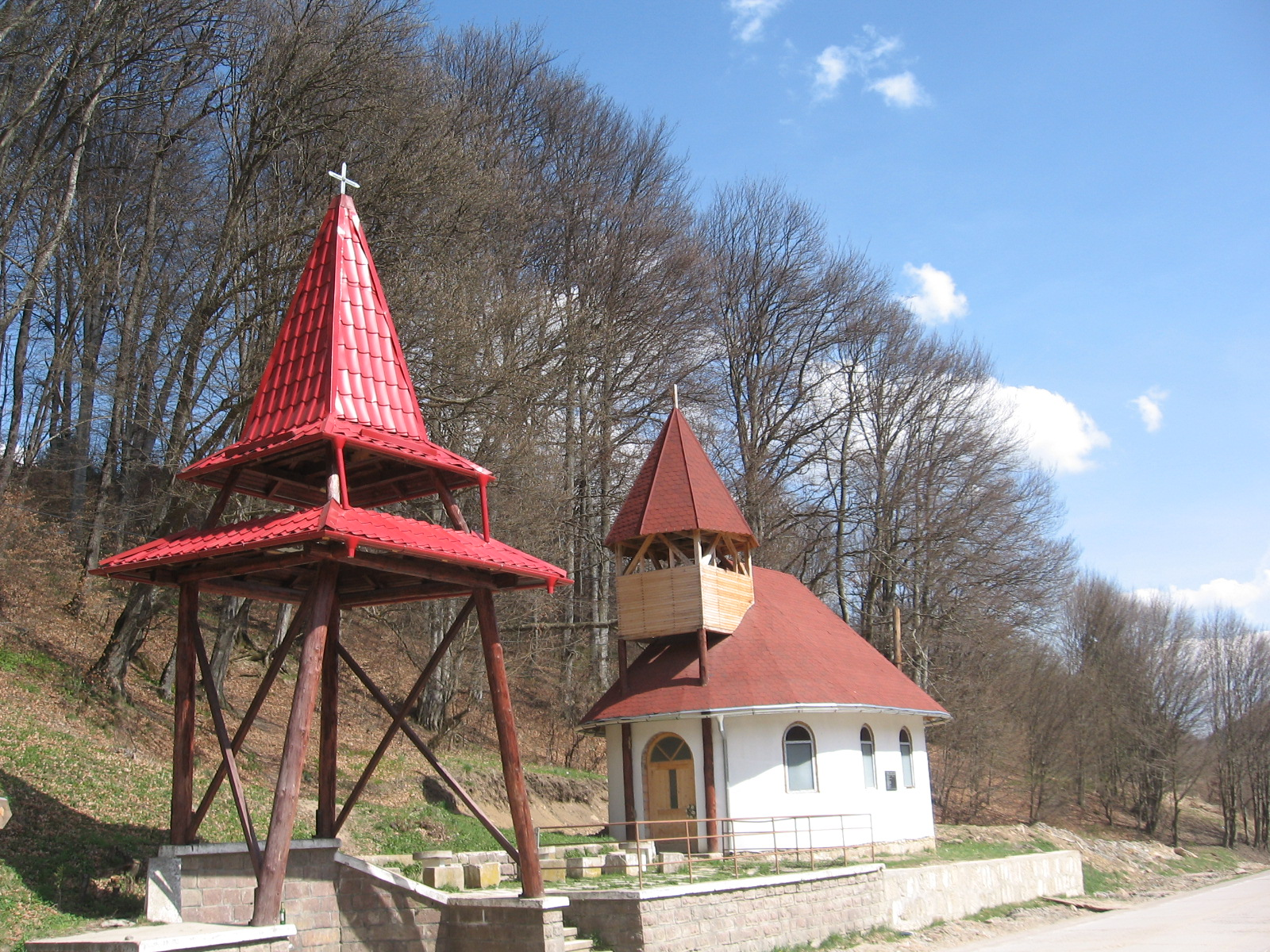
The chapel

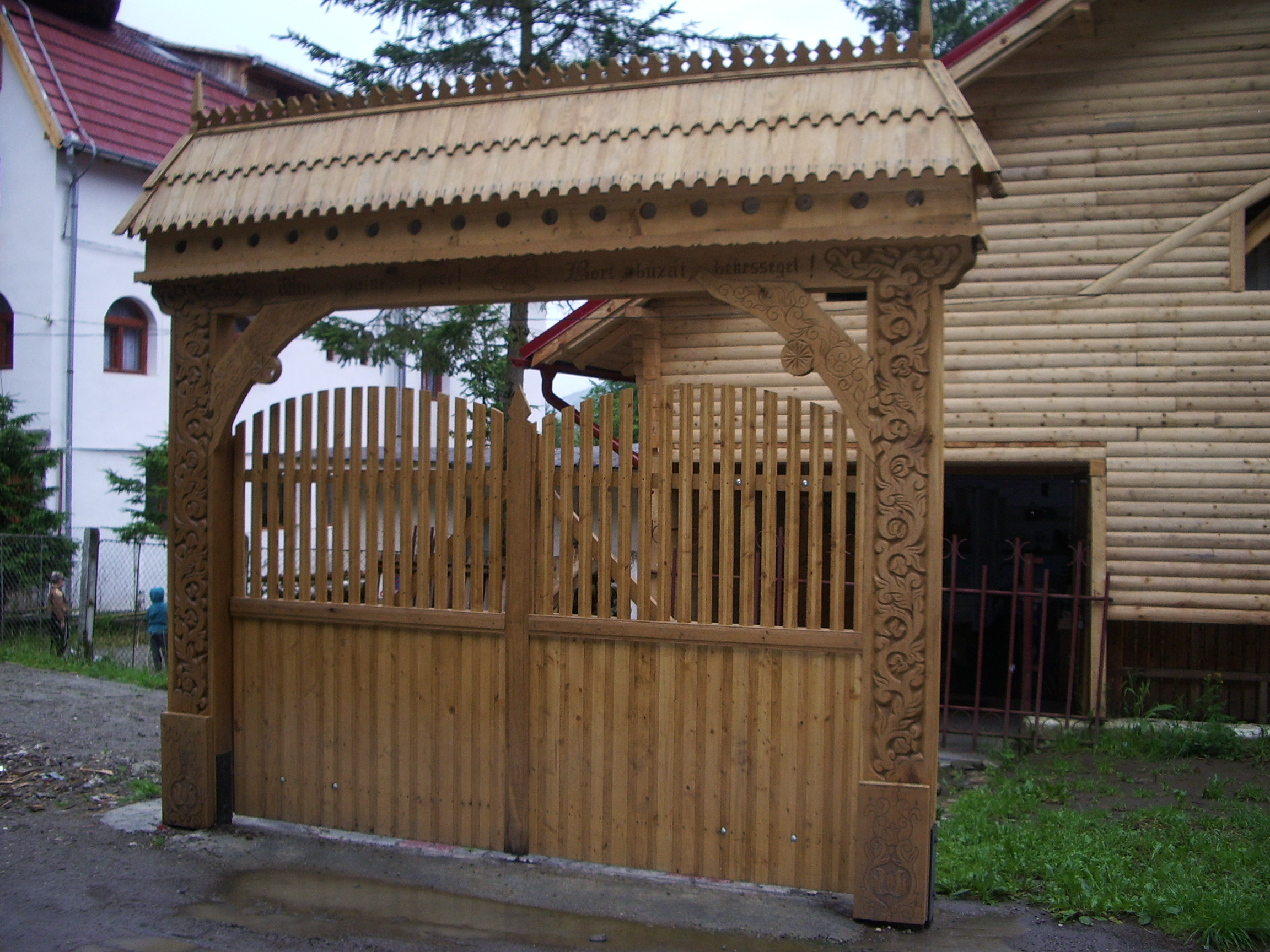
A Székely gate

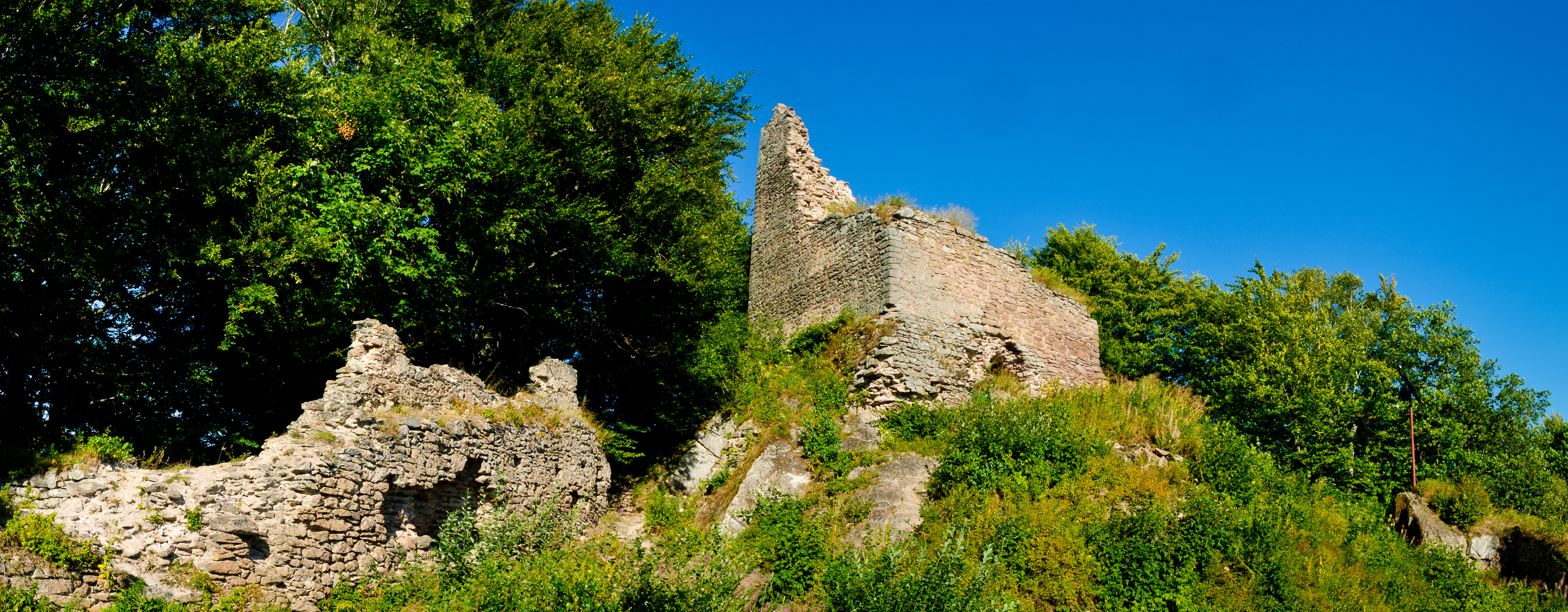
Balvanyos Citadel

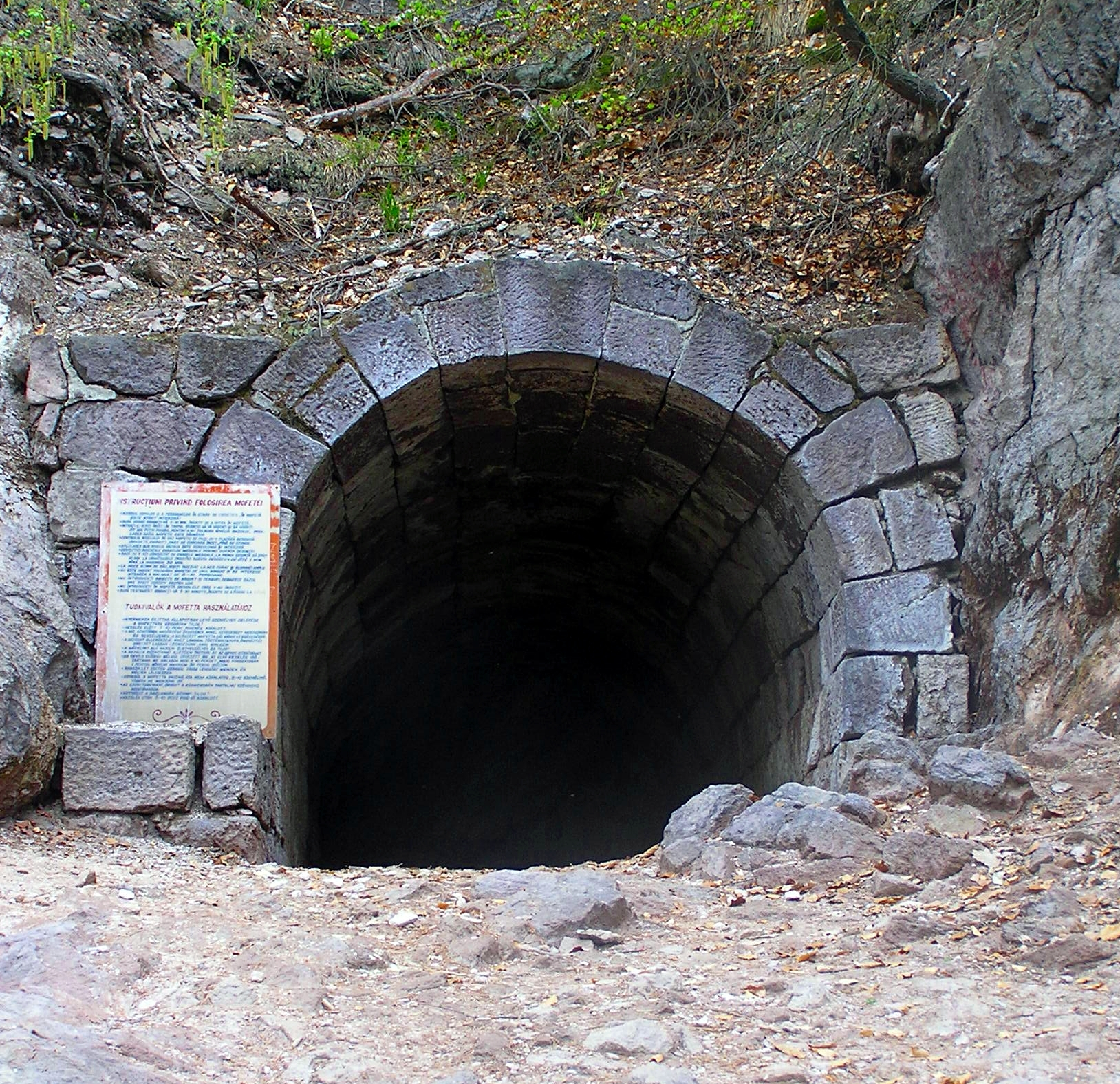
Smelly cave of Torja
