= Turia, Covasna =

Turia Torja
- Commune
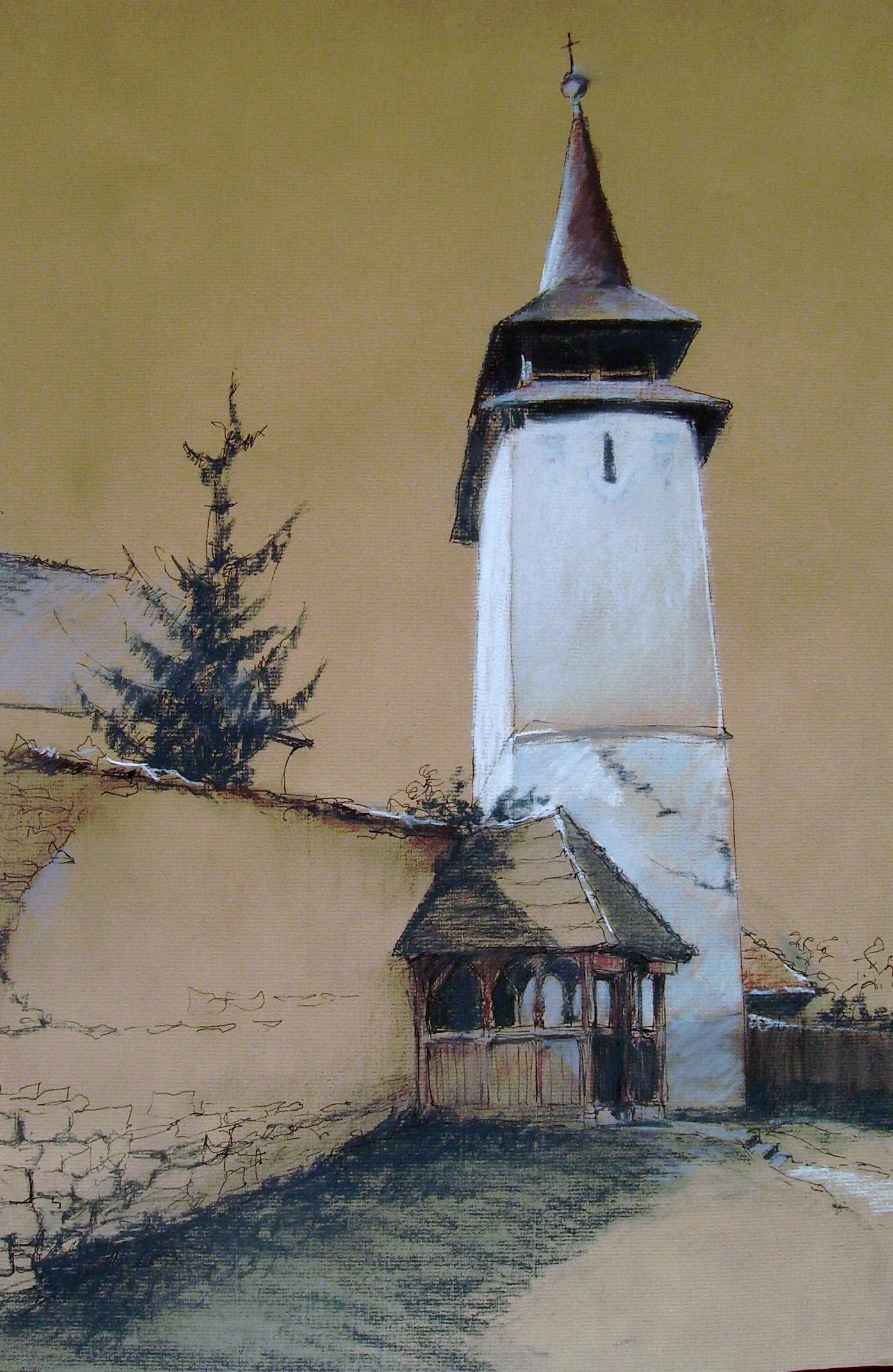
- Steeple of Torja by Béla Tarcsay

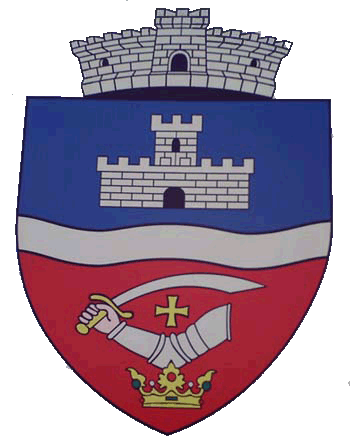
- Coat of arms

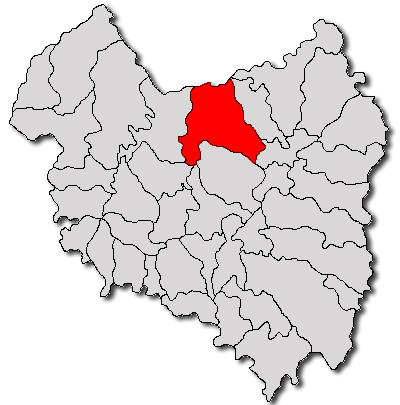
- Location in Covasna County

- Location in Romania
- Coordinates: 46°2′N 26°3′E
- Country: Romania
- County: Covasna

Government
  - Mayor (2020–2024): Attila Daragus (UDMR)
- Area: 147.17 km^{2} (56.82 sq mi)
- Elevation: 599 m (1,965 ft)
- Highest elevation: 950 m (3,120 ft)
- Population (2021-12-01): 3,622
  - Density: 24.61/km^{2} (63.74/sq mi)
- Time zone: UTC+02:00 (EET)
  - Summer (DST): UTC+03:00 (EEST)
- Postal code: 527160
- Area code: (+40) 02 67
- Vehicle reg.: CV
- Website: torja.info

Turia (Hungarian: Torja, Hungarian pronunciation: [ˈtorjɒ]) is a commune in Covasna County, Transylvania, Romania composed of two villages: Alungeni (Futásfalva) and Turia.

== Geography ==
The commune is situated in a hilly region at the foot of the Bodoc Mountains in the Eastern Carpathians, on the banks of the river Turia. It is located in the northern part of Covasna County, 10 km (6.2 mi) northwest of Târgu Secuiesc and about 50 km (31 mi) northeast of the county seat, Sfântu Gheorghe, on the border with Harghita County. Turia is crossed by national road DN11C, which runs from Târgu Secuiesc to Bixad.

== History ==
The locality formed part of the Székely Land region of the historical Transylvania province. From 1876 until 1918, the village belonged to the Háromszék County of the Kingdom of Hungary. In the aftermath of World War I, the Union of Transylvania with Romania was declared in December 1918. At the start of the Hungarian–Romanian War of 1918–1919, the town passed under Romanian administration. After the Treaty of Trianon of 1920, it became part of the Kingdom of Romania and fell within plasa Târgu Secuiesc of Trei Scaune County. In 1940, the Second Vienna Award granted Northern Transylvania to the Kingdom of Hungary. In September 1944, during World War II, Romanian and Soviet armies entered the locality. The territory of Northern Transylvania remained under Soviet military administration until March 9, 1945, after which it became again part of Romania. Between 1952 and 1960, Turia belonged to the Magyar Autonomous Region, and between 1960 and 1968 it was part of Târgu Secuiesc raion in Brașov Region. In 1968, when Romania was reorganized based on counties rather than regions, the commune became part of Covasna County.

== Demographics ==
Historical population
| Year | Pop. | ±% |
|---|---|---|
| 2002 | 3,918 | — |
| 2011 | 4,027 | +2.8% |
| 2021 | 3,622 | −10.1% |
Source: Census data

The commune has an absolute Székely Hungarian majority. At the 2011 census it had a population of 4,027, of which 98.31% were Hungarians and 1.07% Romanians. At the 2021 census Turia had a population of 3,622, of which 93.93% were Hungarians and 1.08% Romanians.

== Points of interest ==
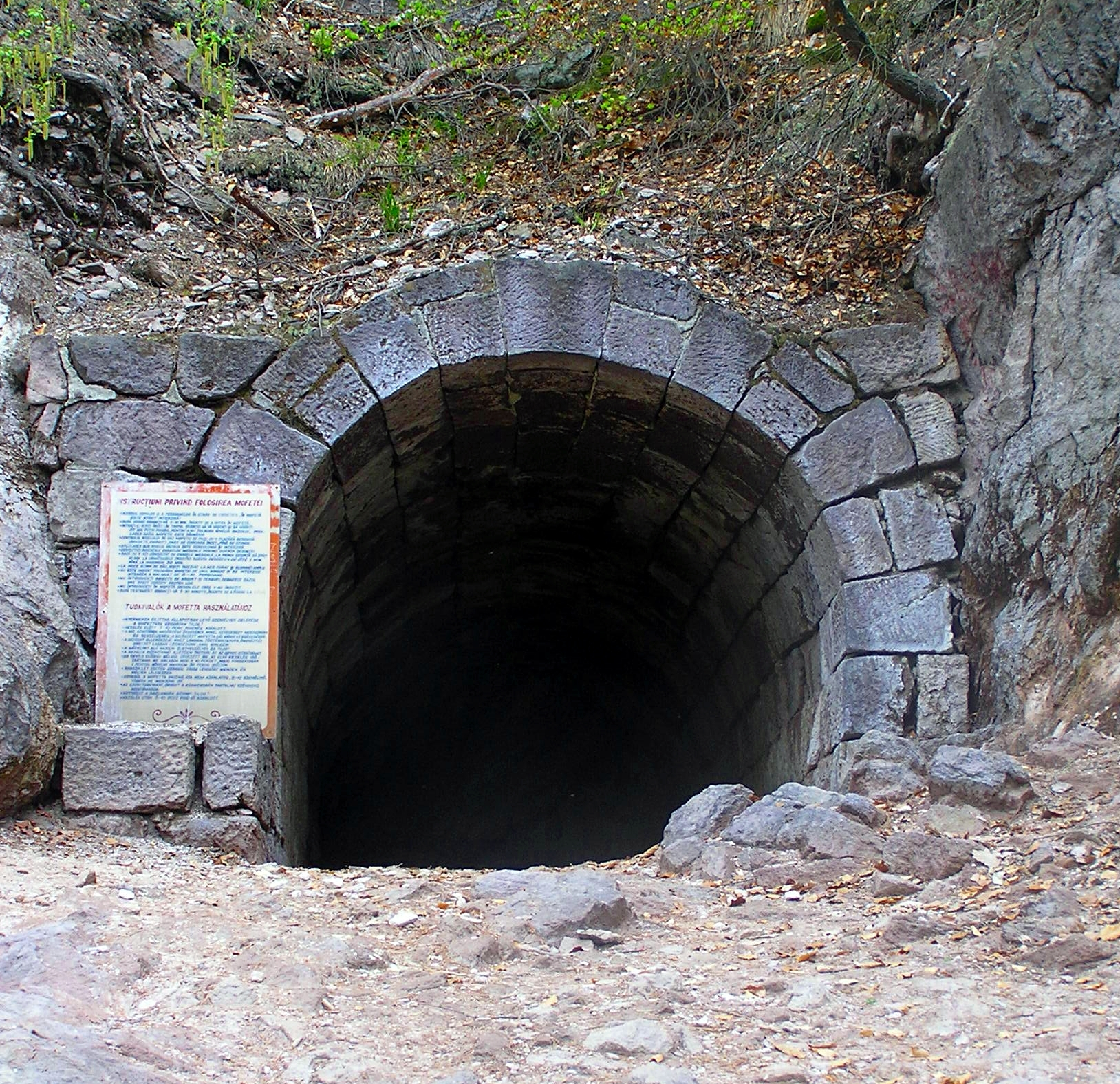
The smelly cave (mofetta) of Torja

Balvanyos is a spa resort located on the territory of Turia commune. It lies at an altitude 840–950 metres (2,760–3,120 ft) on the southern slopes of the Bodoc Mountains. The spa is located close to the ruins of the 11th century Bálványos Castle.
