= Péter Apor =

Hungarian count (főispán) and historian

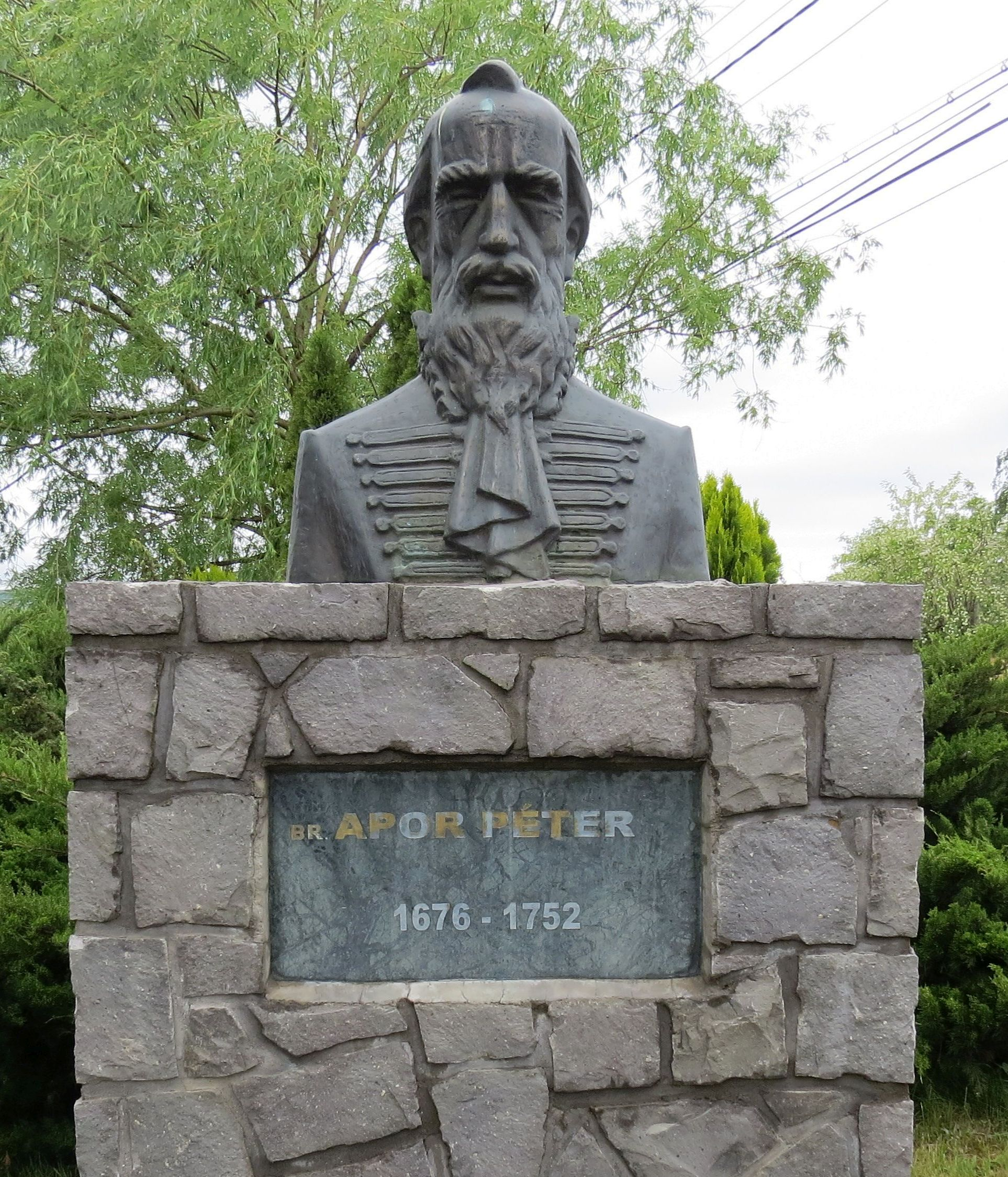
Bronze statue of Péter Apor

Baron Péter Apor de Altorja (1676–1752) was a Hungarian count (főispán) and historian. He was a member of the aristocratic Apor family.

== Life ==
He was born in 1676, and lost his father early. He started his studies in 1686 in Kolozsvár after he continued it in Nagyszombat Hungarian Catholic University. In 1695/96, he earned his doctor degree in law and free arts. He returned to Transylvania and remained loyal supporter of the Habsburgs.

In 1699, Leopold I nominated him as count (főispán) of Küküllő county (highest administrative position in the Hungarian county). He suffered material losses in the Rákóczi revolution. In 1704, he lived in Kronstadt after fled to Wallachia. In 1706, he returned and joined the revolution. In 1707 Colonel Graven captured him and he was kept in custody for 2 years. In 1707, he was excused and nominated as Háromszék royal judge. In 1713, he was granted the countship (as hereditary count, part of the aristocracy, only title).

He fled from the epidemic to the Moldavian Galați and spent few years there. In 1744, he was nominated to government position in Vienna as "main court consultant" and received from King Charles III a golden necklace. He did not work in his new position but remained in Transylvania.

== Works ==
- Metamorphosis Transylvaniae published in 1736
- Lusus mundi et ejusdem actus Scenicus, prout in humillima familia Aporiana ab exitu quidem ex Scythia non interrupta serie nobilis, sic in reliquis eidem sangvine junctis inclitis familiis, opere et veritate. Anno 1727. Synopsis mutationum notabiliorum aetate mea in Transylvania et progressus vitae meae. published in 1727
- Syntagma et syllabus vivorum et mortuorum aetate mea, qui memoriam non fugerunt not published
- Manuscript on the Transylvanian wild animals

== Literature ==
- Szinnyei József: Magyar írók élete és munkái, Arcanum, Budapest, 2000, ISBN 963-86029-9-6
- Metamorphosis Transylvaniae (Hardcover)
