= Freeholder =

Freeholder may refer to:

- one who is in freehold (law)
- one who holds title to real property in fee simple
- County Commissioner, an official of county government in the U.S. state of New Jersey that was formerly referred to as a freeholder.
