= Primipilus (social status) =

Title and rank in Hungary, 15th-20th century

Székely primipilus on horseback in the 1658 coat of arms of János Rácz

The Latin term primipilus referred to a social status common among the Székelys living in the Kingdom of Hungary and the Principality of Transylvania in the 15th–20th centuries. The use of the title and rank of primipilus (in Hungarian lófő, IPA: /ˈloːføː/) was abolished in Hungary by Act IV of 1947.

== History ==
=== Origin ===
The origin of the Hungarian term lófő, in which "ló-" means horse and "-fő" means head, remains disputed to this day. The lófő-s are symbolic figures of the Székely people's equestrian warfare, who frequently appear in national mythology and are the guardians of Székely freedom. The reference to the lófő-s as the ruling class of the medieval Székely people was made through the figurative use of the Roman term "primipilus," a usage that persisted until the 18th century. The Latin term primipilus (plural primipilii) was borrowed from Roman military terminology.

=== Primipili in the Székely feudal society ===
Among the Székelys who settled on the eastern borders of the Kingdom of Hungary, social stratification gradually took place in the 15th century, resulting in some members of the initially almost equal military society gaining greater influence. The growing power of the Székely elite is evident in the fact that certain families acquired estates outside the Székely Land, in the counties of Transylvania, which also opened up opportunities for them to hold certain offices in those counties. These powerful landowners soon began to rise above the rules of the Székely community, which first caused internal tension and then led to several uprisings.

King Matthias Corvinus remedied this situation by issuing a decree dividing the Székelys entrusted with military duties into three different social ranks. Accordingly, from 1473 onwards, members of the Székely nation could be classified as primores, primipilii and pedites, based on their military service and wealth. Those who did not perform military service, serfs and peasants, did not belong to the privileged noble Székely nation.

Over the centuries, there have been minor differences in who was designated as primipilus. Generally, they were those who purchased equipment and performed military service at their own expense with at least one horse kept for military purposes:

"Every Székely lófő must be fit for military services, equipped with a good horse, lined iron armour, a shield, armour, and a lance [...] and other military equipment, is obliged, at the command of the emperor and the voivode, to rise up during general and partial campaigns, to serve as a soldier at his own expense until the end of the campaign, and to serve the homeland even at the cost of his life and property." (Sigismund Báthory, Déva, 1601.)

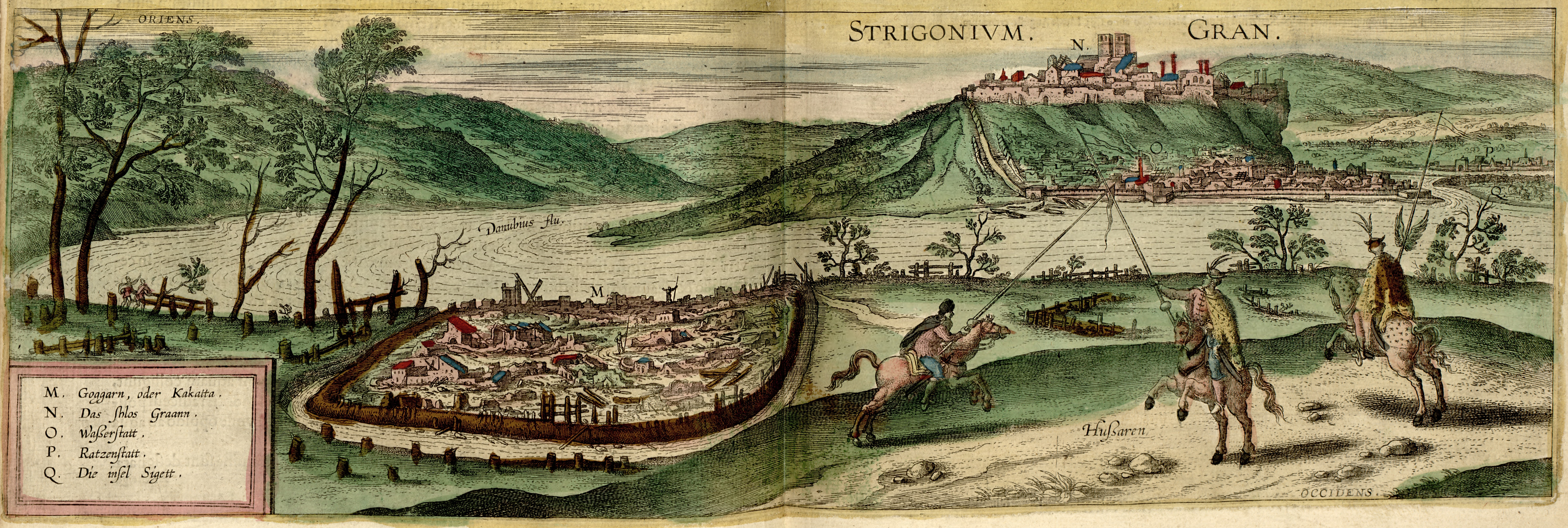

In addition, primipili had to appear at military censuses ordered by the ruler. However, primipilus did not only mean a category in military service, but also a hereditary social rank. This is evidenced by the fact that in certain parts of Székely Land, during military musterings, foot soldiers were also counted among the primipili whose fathers were primipili. In connection with their military policy, the Transylvanian princes issued letters of donation (primipilate) similar to letters of nobility in the 16th–18th centuries, in which they elevated members of the Székely nation to the rank of primipilus.

After the Principality of Transylvania came under the rule of the Habsburg Empire, the Székelys were disarmed and relieved of their military duties. After the defeat of the Rákóczi War of Independence, warfare, as an obligation, ceased to be part of everyday life in Székely Land for half a century. When Maria Theresa established the Military Order in 1764, the specific laws and traditions of the Székely people were not taken into account, and the Székely people were deprived of their freedoms and forced into compulsory military service.

In the border guard, only the financial status of the person concerned determined whether he would perform military service as a hussar or as an infantryman. Only those with hereditary or personal nobility recognized by the emperor and the ecclesiastical nobles (Latin: preadium). The hereditary primipilii, those with primipilate letters of privilege, had to perform compulsory military service, and the terms lófő and primipilus were no longer used.

=== Primipilii in the Hierarchy of the Székely Nobility ===
The reference to the Szekler collective nobility was accepted in both a public law and political sense until the enactment of Act XLIII of 1868. The Székelys had their own "ancient freedom" (libertas Siculorum), laws, customs, and rights. Their noble privileges were granted to them by the so-called "first occupation" right, as the territory of Székely Land was not royal land compared to the other nations of Transylvania. The legal status of Székely was an innate personal right that was valid throughout the entire territory of the Hungarian Holy Crown.

The Székely nobility is structured hierarchically and consists of three ranks. The highest class of the Székely nobility was the primores (singular: primor), which came into use in 1473. The members of the primores were also called Arch-nobles (Hungarian: székely főember), and initially consisted of officials from the former tribal organization, but later also included persons who had received letters of nobility from the Prince of Transylvania and their descendants. The primores were Székely aristocrats and were equivalent to the barons of the Kingdom of Hungary. Székely law did not recognize the ranks of the Western European aristocracy, however from the end of the 17th century onwards, many Székely magnate families were granted the ranks of baron and count under Hungarian and Austrian law by the ruler of the Habsburg Empire. Such were, for example, the Apor, Mikes, and Kálnoky families.

The second highest noble status was that of the primipilii, who were middle-ranking nobles serving in the cavalry. Initially, the primipilii had a status equivalent to that of the nobility of the Hungarian counties, but due to the military policy of the Transylvanian princes, they increasingly belonged to the petty nobility. Most primipilii owned 1-2 serf estates and were mainly engaged in animal husbandry. The wealthier primipilii also built small mansions and often held public office in the church, village, or county administration. The primipilus are considered the most symbolic figures of Székely identity, as they were both soldiers and nobles, and as small landowners, they were engaged in agriculture, animal husbandry, and forestry until very recently.

At the same time, many of the primipilus formed the intellectual class of rural Székely society, as their financial circumstances made it easier for them to educate their children, and the military also required a certain level of education. From the second half of the 18th century, however, compulsory military service significantly worsened their social situation by having the Habsburg officers regulate the conscripts' school attendance. The Székelys had to serve in the army and pay taxes at the same time, and in addition to cultivating their land, they rarely had the opportunity or economic power to pursue education, hold office, or achieve personal social advancement. During this period, serious tensions arose in the Székely village communities between the former primipilii and the Armal nobles. The latter differed from the primipilii in that they could prove their nobility with a letter of donation from the ruler, but in reality, their financial situation often differed little from that of free peasants.

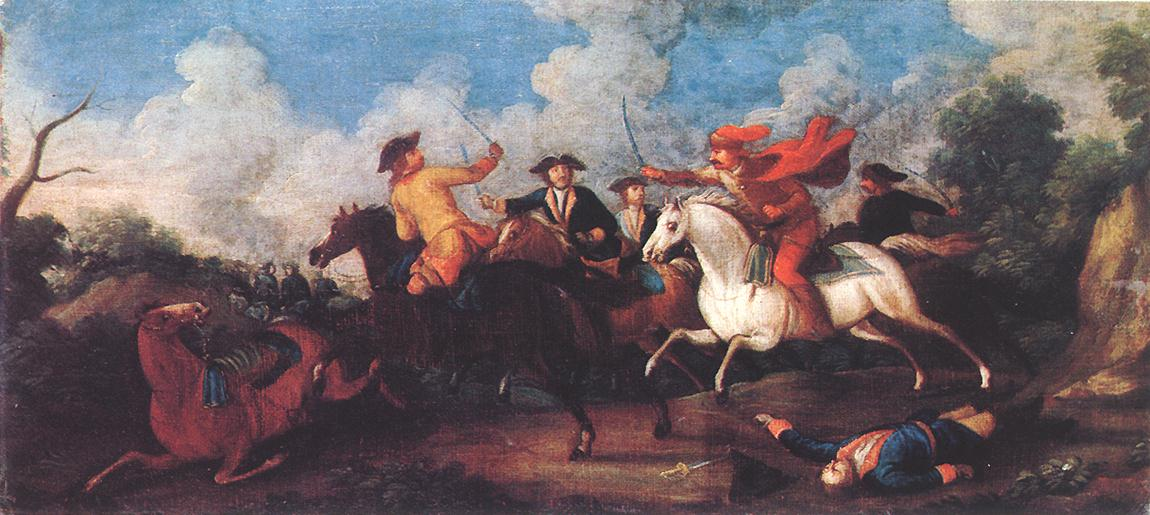

=== Similarities in European history ===
Compared to Primipilii, there are parallels with numerous similar social groups in European history. The similarities are mainly in their military function and hereditary free status, and are sometimes observed in cavalry military service.

Although there is no perfect match, the primipilii show many similarities with the following social groups.

Country/region	Condition	Characteristisc
Kingdom of Hungary, Principality of Transylvania	Primipilus	A minor nobleman who served in the military cavalry, engaged in agriculture and animal husbandry, was allowed to use his own coat of arms, and usually had one or two serfs.
England	Yeoman	A free peasant or small landowner who often farmed his own land and was liable for military service (especially as an archer). Yeomen occupied a position between the peasantry and the nobility: they were free men, paid taxes, and had limited political rights.
England, Ireland	Landed gentry/ Squirearchy	The landed gentry of England were free landowners who held local authority and military obligations without belonging to the titled nobility. They lived from the income of their estates and often served as officers or local magistrates.
France	Gentilhomme	The gentilhomme in France was a member of the nobility by birth, belonging to the petite noblesse or lower nobility. A gentilhomme was expected to live according to aristocratic values — honor, military service, and refined manners — even if he possessed only modest estates.
Scotland	Clansman	A free-born member of a clan, bound by military service to their chief. Clansmen enjoyed a degree of autonomy and local prestige, acting as both landholders and warriors.
Spain, Portugal	Hidalgo	Hidalgo in Spain was a member of the lower nobility, often holding modest estates and enjoying tax exemptions and certain privileges. They were expected to provide military service when called upon, and participate in local governance.

Székely hussar uniforms during the 18th century in Habsburg Monarchy

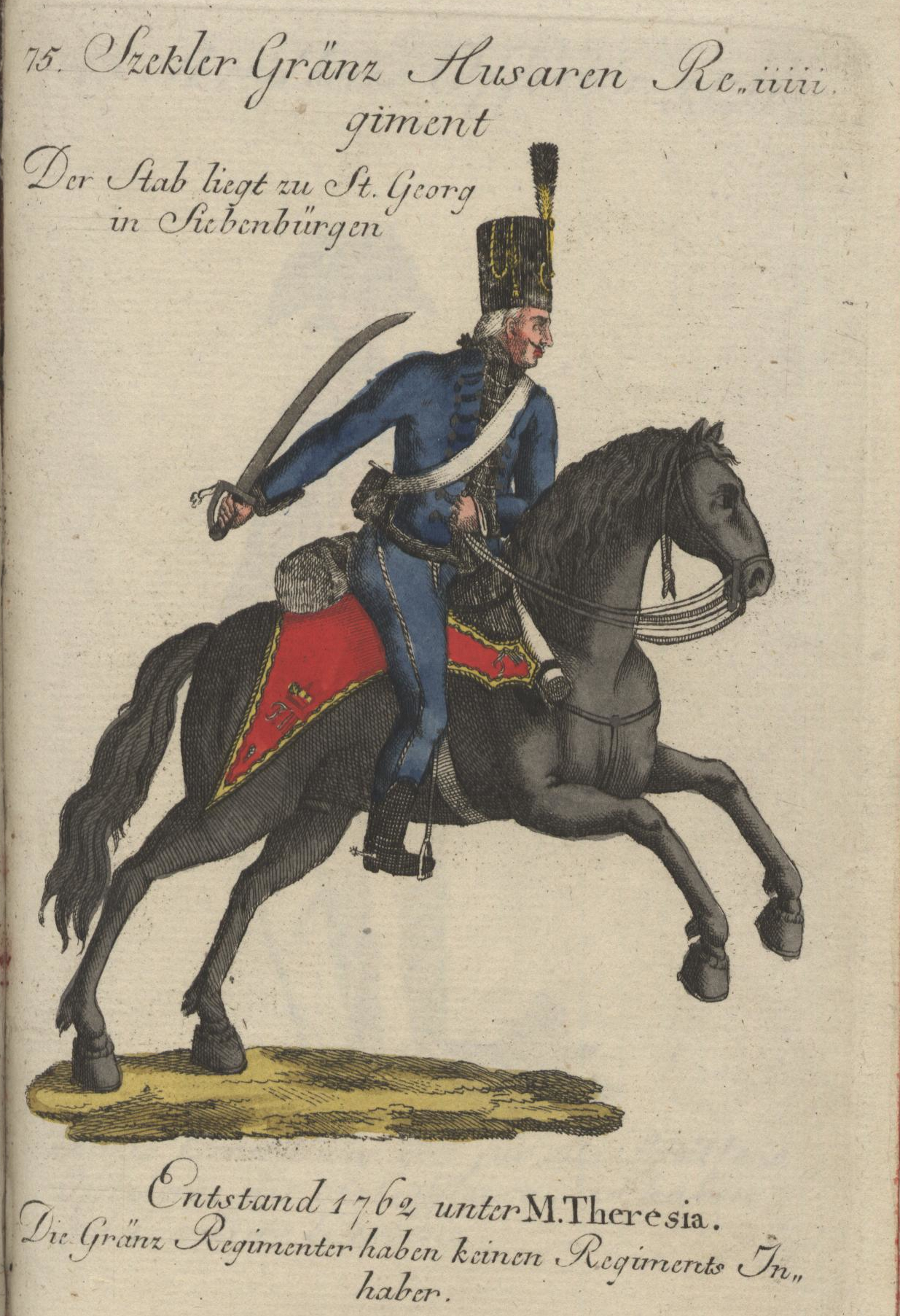

== Famous people ==
The following list includes some famous people who come from primipilus families or had primipilus ancestors.

- Miklós Barabás de Márkosfalva (1810–1898), Hungarian painter
- Elek Benedek de Kisbacon (1859–1929), the Hungarian "Great Folk Tale Teller"
- Alexander Csoma de Kőrös (1784–1842), Hungarian philologist and Orientalist
- Vilmos Nagy de Nagybacon (1884–1976), Hungarian Minister of Defence, historian
- Theodore Puskás de Ditró (1844–1893), Hungarian inventor, telephone pioneer

== See also ==
- Székely
- Székely Land
