= Plăieșii de Jos =

Plăieșii de Jos Kászon
- Commune
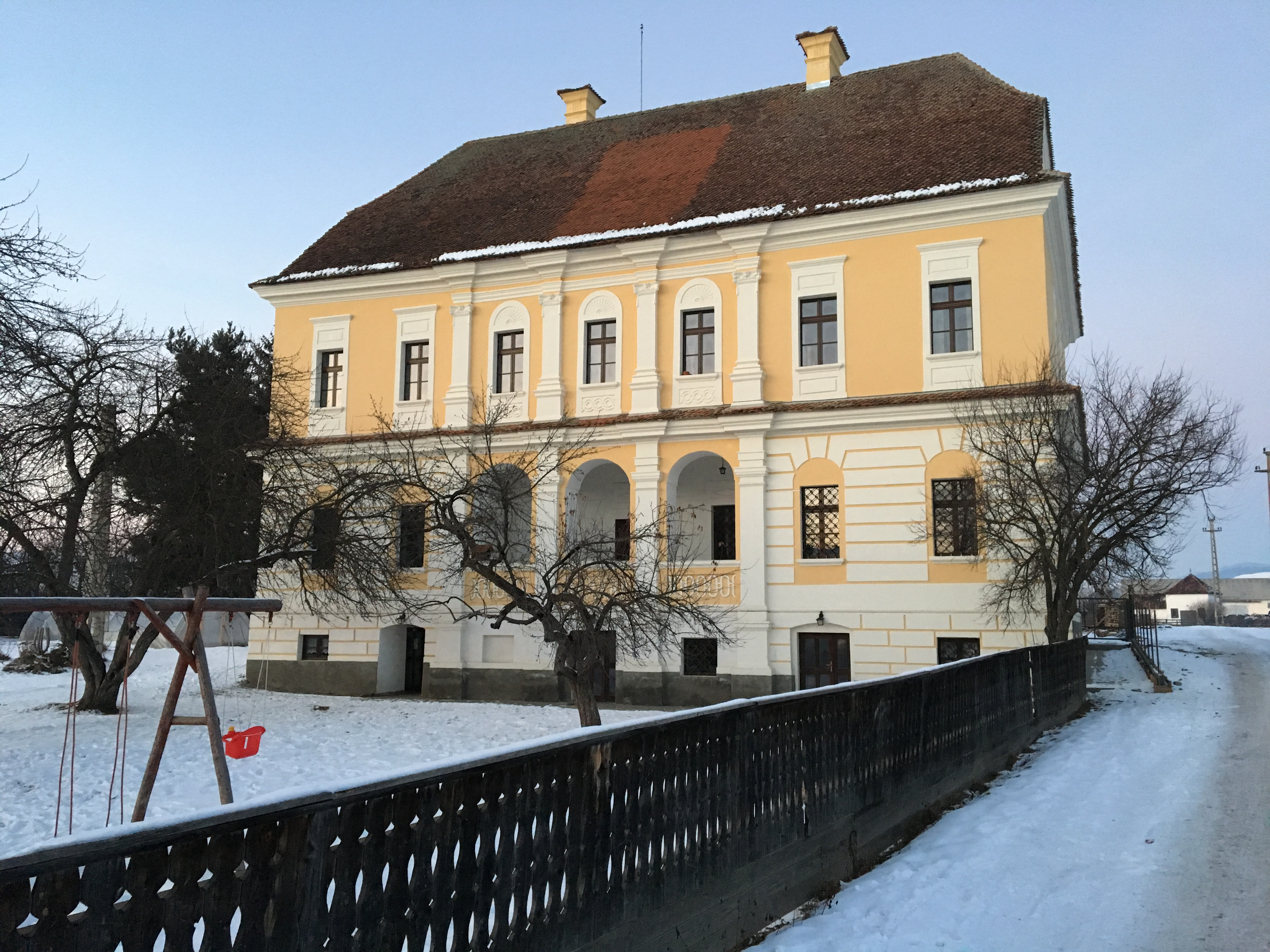
- Balási Castle in Imper

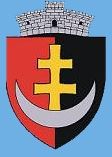
- Coat of arms

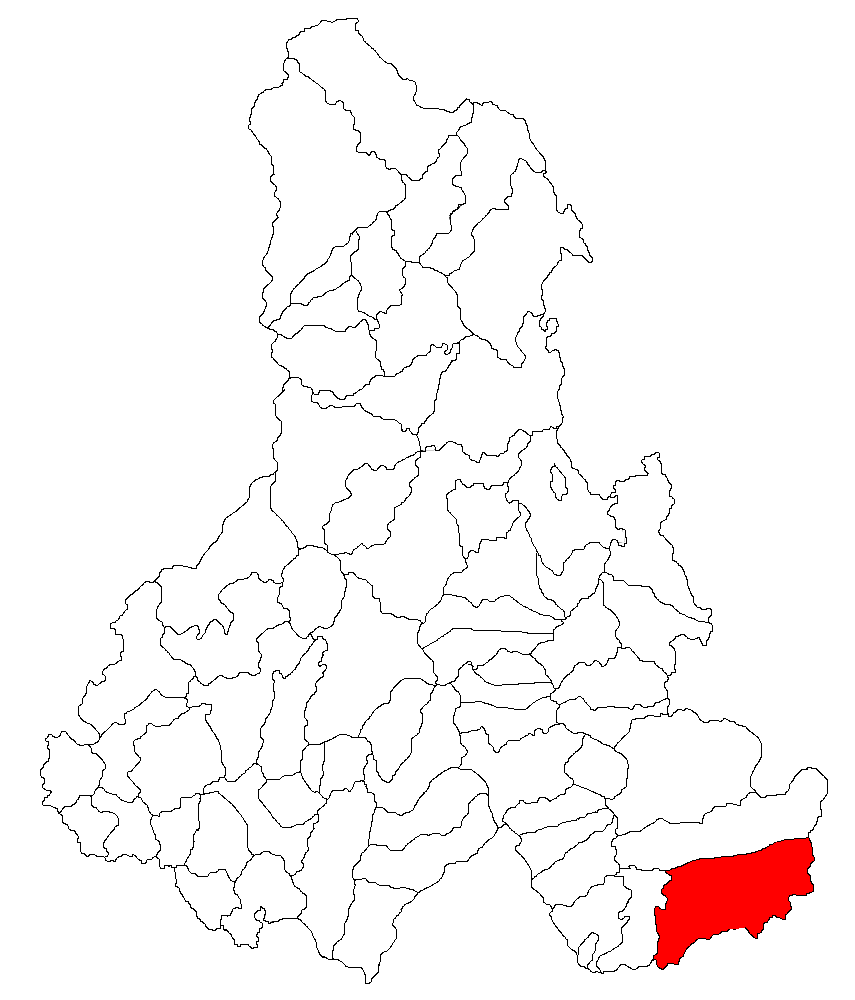
- Location in Harghita County

- Location in Romania
- Coordinates: 46°14′N 26°06′E
- Country: Romania
- County: Harghita

Government
  - Mayor (2020–2024): Zoltán András (UDMR)
- Area: 302.52 km^{2} (116.80 sq mi)
- Elevation: 719 m (2,359 ft)
- Population (2021-12-01): 2,819
  - Density: 9.318/km^{2} (24.13/sq mi)
- Time zone: UTC+02:00 (EET)
  - Summer (DST): UTC+03:00 (EEST)
- Postal code: 537235
- Area code: +40 266
- Vehicle reg.: HR
- Website: www.kaszon.ro

Plăieșii de Jos (Hungarian: Kászonaltíz or Kászon, Hungarian pronunciation: [ˈkaːson]) is a commune in Harghita County, Romania. It lies in the Székely Land, an ethno-cultural region in eastern Transylvania. The commune is composed of five villages: Cașinu Nou (Kászonújfalu), Iacobeni (Kászonjakabfalva), Imper (colloquially Imper-Doboi or Doboi, Kászonimpér), Plăieșii de Jos, and Plăieșii de Sus (Kászonfeltíz).

== Geography ==
The commune lies on the banks of the Cașin River and its tributary, Pârâul Primejdios, in a hilly area at the foot of the Ciuc Mountains. It is located at the southeastern extremity of Harghita County, 42 km (26 mi) from the county seat, Miercurea Ciuc, on the border with Covasna County (to the south) and Bacău County (to the east).

== History ==
The villages were part of the Székely Land region of the historical Transylvania province. They belonged to Csíkszék district. In 1850, they became part of the Udvarhely military region. After the administrative reform of Transylvania in 1876, they fell within the Csík County in the Kingdom of Hungary. After the Hungarian–Romanian War of 1919 and the Treaty of Trianon of 1920, they became part of the Kingdom of Romania and fell within Ciuc County during the interwar period. In 1940, the Second Vienna Award granted Northern Transylvania to Hungary and the villages were held by Hungary until the fall of 1944, when Romanian and Soviet troops regained control during World War II. After a brief Soviet occupation, the Romanian administration returned in March 1945. Between 1952 and 1960, the commune fell within the Magyar Autonomous Region and between 1960 and 1968 the Mureș-Magyar Autonomous Region. In 1968, the region was abolished, and since then, the commune has been part of Harghita County.

== Demographics ==
Historical population
Year	Pop.	±%
1850	6,905	—
1920	6,633	−3.9%
1941	6,247	−5.8%
1966	4,624	−26.0%
2002	2,979	−35.6%
2011	3,033	+1.8%
2021	2,819	−7.1%
Source: Census data

The commune has an absolute Hungarian (Székely) majority. According to the 2011 census, it had a population of 3,033, of which 91% were Hungarians, 6.13% Romanians, and 1.38% Roma. At the 2021 census, Plăieșii de Jos had a population of 2,819; of those, 81.2% were Hungarians, 11.56% Roma, and 4.15% Romanians.

== Twinnings ==
Plăieșii de Jos is twinned with:

- Abacseke, Hungary
- Abasár, Hungary
- Ásotthalom, Hungary
- Csákvár, Hungary
- Lepsény, Hungary
- Puplinge, Switzerland
- Szajol, Hungary
