= Ziyad =

Ziad
- Pronunciation: Arabic: [ˈziːjaːd]
- Gender: Male
- Language: Arabic

Origin
- Language: Arabic
- Origin: Middle East, Arabian Peninsula
- Meaning: abundance, growth, generous, greater

Other names
- Variant forms: Ziad, Zyad, Zeyad, Zijad, Ziyad
- Related names: Zayd, Zaid

Ziad (/ˈziːjɑːd, -jæd/; Arabic: زياد, romanized: Ziād) is an Arabic given name and surname.

== Given name ==
=== Actors ===
- Zeyad Errafae'ie (1969–2009), Syrian television actor and voice actor

=== Athletes ===
- Zeyad Abdulrazak (born 1969), Kuwaiti hurdler
- Zeyad Mater (born 1991), Yemeni judoka
- Zyad Chaabo (born 1979), Syrian footballer
- Ziad Jaziri (born 1978), Tunisian football striker
- Ziad Richa (born 1967), Lebanese skeet shooter
- Ziad Tlemçani (born 1963), Tunisian footballer
- Ziyad Tariq Aziz Brisam (born 1977), Iraqi football defender
- Ziyad al-Kord (born 1974), Palestinian footballer
- Ziyad al-Sahafi (born 1994), Saudi Arabian footballer
- Ziyad al-Johani (born 2001), Saudi Arabian footballer
- Zyad Jusić (born 1980), Dutch football striker

=== Businessmen ===
- Ziad Takieddine (1950–2025), Lebanese-French businessman, alleged arms broker
- Ziad Makkawi (born 1961), Lebanese American investor
- Ziyad Cattan, Iraqi Polish businessman, alleged arms dealer

=== Film directors ===
- Ziad Antar (born 1978), Lebanese filmmaker and photographer
- Ziad Doueiri (born 1963), Lebanese film director
- Ziad Touma (born 1983), Lebanese Canadian film director

=== Writers ===
- Ziad Majed (born 1970), Lebanese political researcher
- Ziyad Marar (born 1966), Iraqi writer and publisher

=== Musicians ===
- Ziad Rahbani (1956–2025), Lebanese composer, pianist, playwright, and political commentator

=== Poets ===
- Ziyād al-Aʿd̲j̲am, poet of the Umayyad period of Persian origin

=== Politicians ===
- Siad Barre (1919–1995), Somalian dictator
- Ziad Aboultaif (born 1966), Canadian politician
- Ziad Abs (born 1972), Lebanese politician
- Ziad Abu Amr (born 1950), Palestinian politician, author, and member of the Palestinian Legislative Council
- Ziad Abu Ein (1959–2014), Palestinian politician
- Ziad Bahaa-Eldin (born 1964), Egyptian politician
- Ziyad Baroud (born 1970), Lebanese civil servant and civil society activist
- Ziad Durrani (1982–2012), Pakistani politician
- Ziad Makhzoumi (born 1955), Lebanese British businessman and public speaker
- Ziyad Sabbagh (born 1960), Syrian politician

=== Military ===
- Ziyad ibn Abihi (622–673), Muslim general and administrator
- Ziyad ibn Ubayd Allah al-Harthi, Abbasid governor of Medina from 750 to 758.
- Ziad Fahd, Free Syrian Army brigadier general
- Ziad al-Hariri (1929–2015), Syrian senior officer and defence minister
- Zijad Subašić (died 1992), Bosniak military leader in Višegrad during the early stage of the Bosnian War (1992–95)

=== Other ===
- Ziad Abuzayyad (born 1940), Palestinian lawyer, journalist
- Ziad Rafiq Beydoun (1924–1998), petroleum geologist and professor
- Ziad Fazah (born 1954), Lebanese polyglot
- Ziad el-Doulatli, Tunisian activist
- Ziad al-Khasawneh, Jordanian lawyer who headed a team of twenty-two defence lawyers for former Iraqi President Saddam Hussein.
- Ziad Jarrah (1975–2001), Lebanese terrorist hijacker involved in the hijacking of United Airlines Flight 93
- Ziyad Khaleel, also known as Khalil Ziyad, Ziyad Sadaqa, and Ziyad Abdulrahman, was a Palestinian-American al-Qaeda member
- Zijad Delić (born 1965), Bosnian Canadian imam, activist, teacher, scholar and public speaker

== Surname ==
- Howar Ziad, Iraqi politician and ambassador
- Tawfiq Ziad (1929–1994), Palestinian politician well known for his "poetry of protest".

== See also ==
- Tariq ibn Ziyad (670–720), Umayyad-era commander who led the Muslim conquest of Spain in the 8th century
- Ziyadid dynasty, a Muslim dynasty that ruled western Yemen from 819 until 1018 from the capital city of Zabid
- Zayed (disambiguation)
- Zaid, an Arabic masculine name
