= Qassem Al-Nasser =

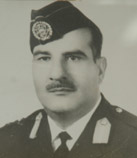
- Born: 1925; Idoun, Irbid, Jordan
- Died: 2007 (aged 81–82)
- Military career
- Rank: Major General
- Nickname: Pasha
- Conflicts: 1948 Arab-Israeli war

HE Major General Qassem Pasha Al-Nasser (1925–2007) (Arabic: اللواء قاسم باشا الناصر) was a Jordanian officer who participated in the 1948 Arab-Israeli War. He was part of many battles, such as: Latrun, Bab El-wad, and Misherem, amongst others. He was the vice-president of the Jordanian Free Officers Movement, which successfully campaigned for the dismissal of British officers from the Jordanian Armed Forces in 1956.

== Early life ==
Qasem Al-Nasser was born in April 1925 in Idoun, a village in Irbid to the North of Amman in the Hashemite Kingdom of Jordan (Formerly 1921–1946 the Emirate of Transjordan). His Father, Sheikh Mohammad Al-Mahmoud Al-Abdullah Al-Nasser Khasawneh, served as the Vice General Director of the Agricultural Credit Corporation. Major-General Al-Nasser had his primary and secondary education in Amman. Abdelmunim al-Rifai (former Prime Minister of Jordan 1969–1970) and Fawzi al-Mulki (former Prime Minister of Jordan 1953–1954) were amongst his teachers at that time. However, Al-Nasser got his higher degree from the Secondary school of Irbid in 1943. The same year, on 22 September, he was commissioned into the Jordanian Armed Forces (formerly known as the 'Arab Army').

== 1948 Palestine War ==
During the war in Palestine he was on top of a four-story wall. He was shot off the wall by an artillery shell, crushed his ribs and survived. Another thing that happened was he was shot and got up, covered the wound with his shirt and walked to the hospital. Qasem Al-Nasser participated in the 1948 Arab-Israeli War. He was one from amongst the Jordanian Officers who were loyal to their country. This background was behind his courageous participation in the events of this war. He was part of many battles, such as: Latrun, Bab El-wad, and Misherem, amongst others. During these battles, he had a serious injury in his head, and despite the pain, he wrapped the scarf—which was part of the Jordanian military uniform—and managed to walk to a close hospital where he got medical treatment. He also provided military training to Palestinian Commandos troops in many of the Palestinian cities.

== Dismissal of British officers ==
Jordanian Officers were devoted to serving their country, and thus were unhappy with the presence of British Officers in all leading positions of the Jordanian Armed Forces. Thus, they formed the "Jordanian Free Officers Movement" which aimed to end the British officers presence, and the cancellation of the Jordanian-British Treaty. The Free Officers Movement elected Shaher Abu-Shahout as president and Qassem Al-Nasser as vice-president. The Movement included many Jordanian officers, including, but are not limited to: Shaher Abu-Shahout, Ali Abu-Nawar, said al sabeh, Mahmoud Al-Maaita, Tourki Al-Hindawi, Ali Al-Hiari, Sharif Zaid Ibn Shaker (later Prince), Natheer Rasheed, Dhafi Al-Jam’ani. The Movement got in contact with late King Hussein bin Talal, informing him with the aims and purposes which the Movement aimed to achieve, and were accepted and blessed by the King. This national effort resulted on 1 March 1956 with courageous declaration by the King to dismiss Lieutenant General John Bagot Glubb, the British commander of the Jordanian Armed Forces. King Hussein issued his instructions to members of the Free Officers Movement to enforce the Royal decree.

== Exile and imprisonment ==
After the Free Officers Movement achieved its goals, the US and UK felt that their interests in Jordan were affected adversely by this Movement and sought to get rid of its members. Both countries managed to convince King Hussein with the allusion that the Movement is planning to overthrow and to unseat the king by means of a revolution similar to what had happened in Egypt in 1952. Consequently, orders to arrest the members of the Movement were issued in 1957. However, since the members of the Movement were in control of all parts of the Army, they were informed with the arrest orders and part of them managed to leave directly to Syria, from amongst of them were: Qassem Al-Nasser, Mahmoud Al-Mousa, Natheer Rasheed, Issam Al-Jundi, and Kamal Al-Hiari, amongst others. While others were imprisoned in the Al-Jafer prison which is located in the desert 200 kilometres (120 mi) to the south of the capital Amman, from amongst of them were: Shaher Abu-Shahout, Mahmoud Al-Maaita, Tourki Al-Hindawi, Dhafi Al-Jam’ani, Ahmad Za’rour, Shawkat Al-Sboul, Abdullah Ga’ed, and Jaffar Al-Shami, amongst others. A private military court issued its decision, and Qassem Al-Nasser was convicted and was sentenced to ten years of imprisonment, and since he was away of Jordan, the decree was strengthened to execution. Al-Nasser lived in the exile for more than four years, during this period, his family were prevented from leaving Jordan to visit him in Syria, so he was secretly sneaking to Jordan to visit his parents. In one of these visits, he got arrested in the house of Hajem Al-Hindawi (one of Al-Nasser's relatives), and sent directly to the prison of the Jordanian Intelligence where he remained under arrest for sixteen months and thirteen days in the same cell with the Palestinian leader Bahjat Abu Gharbieh, and was discharged due to a Royal amnesty issued in 1962.

== Release and later life ==
Qassem Al-Nasser was left without his Jordanian nationality which was withdrawn after the accusations of the revolution plan. It was not until the General Director of the Civil Affairs Directorate returned the nationality to the members of the Free Officers Movement saying that if you were not Jordanians, who would be. Afterwards, Al-Nasser worked in the Council of Construction for a couple of years, before the Director General of the Public Security Directorate Major General Sharif Mohammad Hashem asked Qassem Al-Nasser to return to the Army. Prime Minister Wasfi al-Tal managed to return Al-Nasser to the Public Security Directorate, where he became the deputy Director General of the Public Security Directorate. Thereafter, King Hussein issued his Royal decree appointing Qassem Al-Nasser as the Director General of the Civil Defence Directorate with the rank of Major General. He continued in this post until his retirement from military services, he then refused further posts considering that it was about time to deal with his own business.

== Death ==
Major General Qassem Pasha Al-Nasser died on 4 October 2007 at the age of 82. A prestigious formal and public funeral ceremony was held, with the representative of HM King Abdullah II bin al-Hussein and members of the Jordanian people. Major General Al-Nasser is survived by his children: Maha, Sami, Mahmoud, Sameh, Kamal, Jamal, Sana, Lamia, Mohammad Amin, Rania, and Rula, and three brothers: Dr. Adnan, Brigadier General Adel, and Professor Marwan. Throughout his life, he worked for the issues of his people and country, and devoted himself and the whole of his life to the benefit of Jordan and the Arab world.
