= Zaid =

- Pronunciation: [ˈzæjd]
- Gender: Male
- Language: Arabic

Origin
- Meaning: to increase
- Region of origin: Arabia, Middle East

Other names
- Variant forms: Zayd, Zaïd, Zeyd
- Related names: Ziyad

Zaid or Zayd (/zaɪd/; Arabic: زيد) is an Arabic given name and surname.

== Zaid ==
=== Given name ===
- Zaid Abbas (born 1983), Jordanian basketball player
- Zaid Abdul-Aziz (born 1946), American basketball player
- Zaid Al-Harb (1887–1972), Kuwaiti poet
- Zaid al-Rifai (1936–2024), Jordanian politician and prime minister
- Zaïd Amir (born 2002), Comorian footballer
- Zaid Ashkanani (born 1994), Kuwaiti racing driver
- Zaid Hamid (born 1964), Pakistani political commentator
- Zaid Ibrahim (born 1951), Malaysian politician
- Zaid Orudzhev (born 1932), Russian philosopher
- Zaid Shakir (born 1956), American scholar
- Zaid ibn Shaker (1934–2002), Jordanian general, politician and prime minister

=== Surname ===
- Ghanem Zaid (born 1965), Kuwaiti javelin thrower
- Hikmat Zaid (born 1945), Palestinian politician
- Ibrahim Zaid (born 1990), Saudi Arabian footballer
- Mabrouk Zaid (born 1979), Saudi Arabian footballer
- Samy Abu Zaid (1979–2009), Egyptian football player
- Wahid Ullah Zaid (born 1944), Afghan wrestler

== Zayd ==
- Zayd Abu Zayd (1195–1270), Almohad political leader
- Zayd al-Khayr (died 631), companion of Muhammad
- Zayd ibn al-Dathinnah, companion of Muhammad
- Zayd ibn Ali (695–740), great-grandson of Ali and fifth Imam according to Zaidi Shi'ism
- Zayd ibn al-Khattab (584–632), companion of Muhammad
- Zayd ibn Arqam (died 686), companion of Muhammad
- Zayd ibn Harithah (581–629), companion of Muhammad
- Zayd ibn Suhan (died 656), companion of Muhammad
- Zayd ibn Thabit (610–660), Arab scribe and theologian
- Zayd Mutee' Dammaj (1943–2000), Yemeni author and politician
- Zayd Saidov (born 1958), Tajik politician
- Zayd Salih al-Faqih (born 1964), Yemeni writer

== See also ==
- Arabic name
- Zaidi (disambiguation)
- Ziad, an Arabic given name and surname
- Zidane (name)
- Zayed (disambiguation)
