= Sha'ar HaGai =

Point on the Tel Aviv-Jerusalem highway

Coordinates: 31°49′N 35°2′E

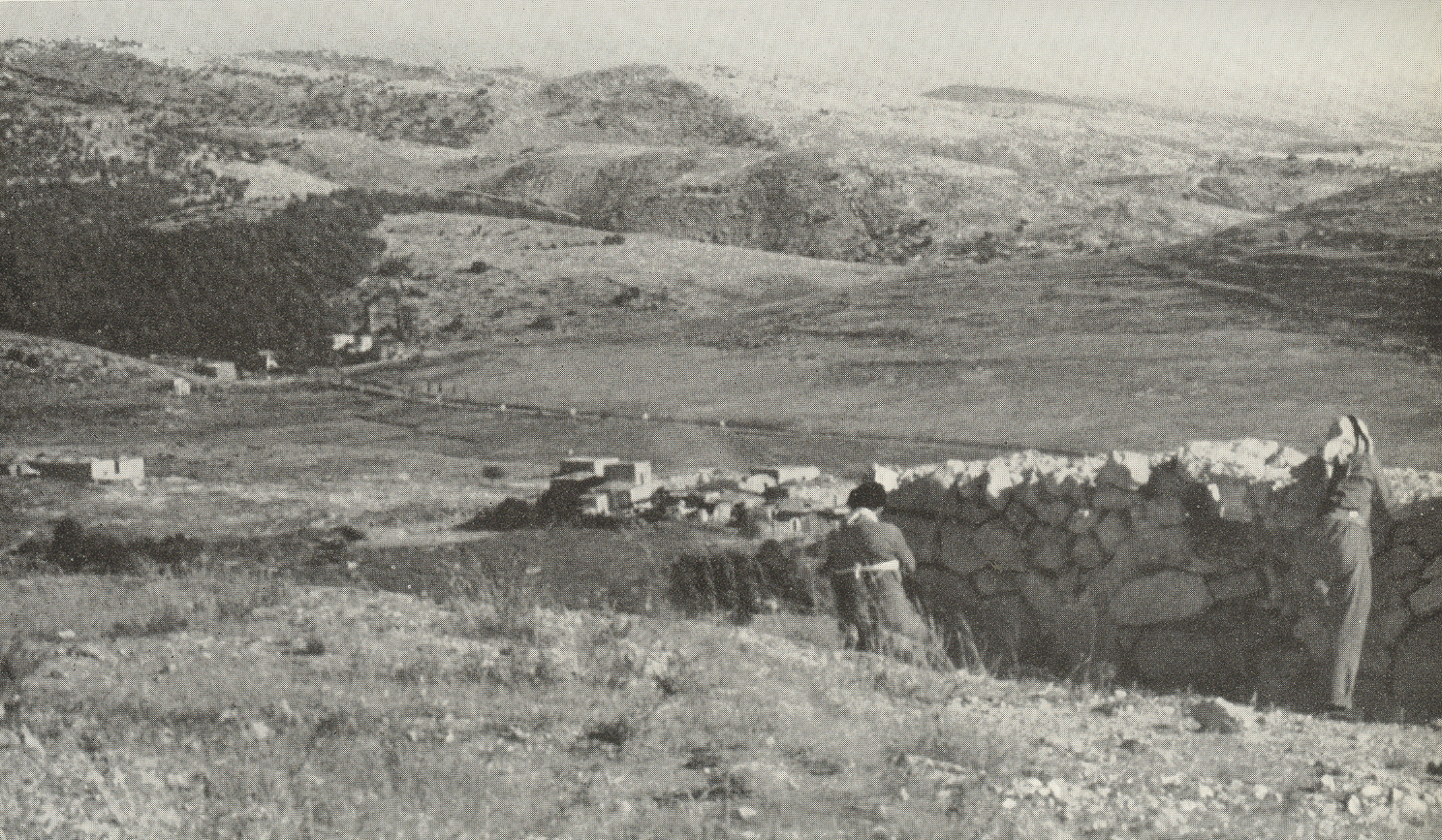
Road to Jerusalem at Bab al-Wad seen from Arab Legion positions at Latrun, 1948

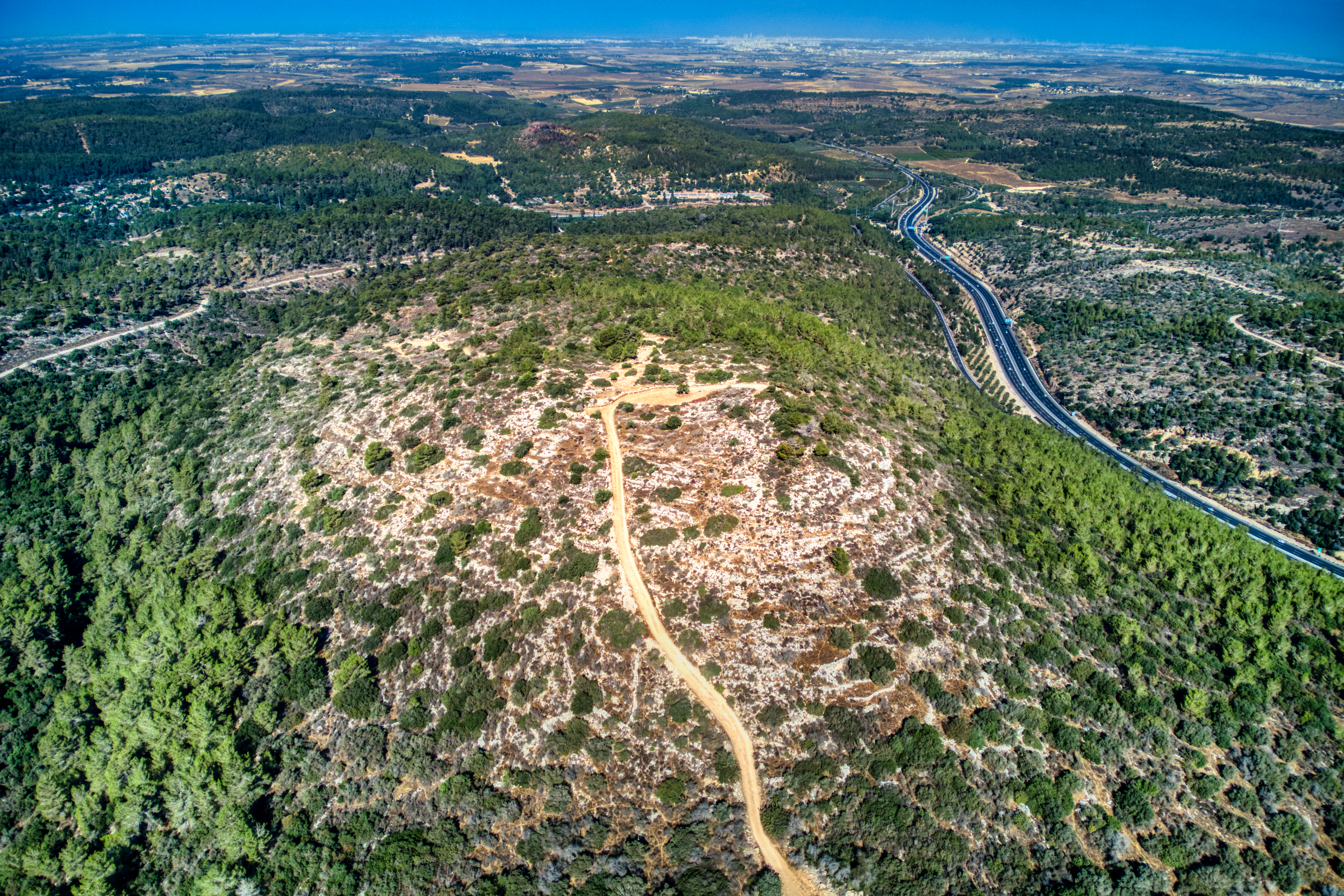
Outpost 21 on Shayarot Ridge over Sha'ar HaGai - on the right is Highway 1, and on the left is Burma Road

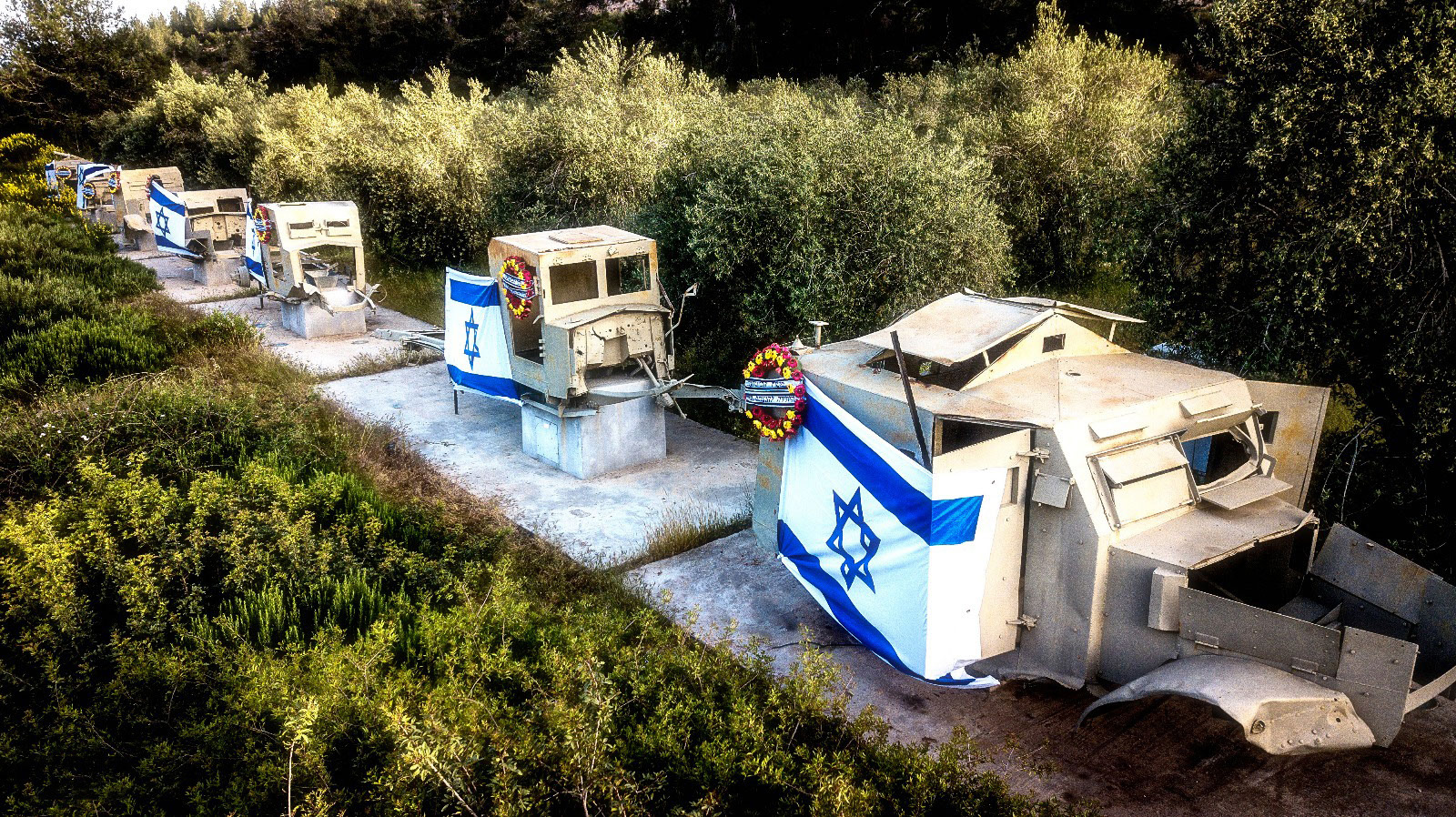
Old armored vehicles ("sandwich trucks") at Sha'ar HaGai

Sha'ar HaGai (Hebrew: שער הגיא) in Hebrew, a name literally translated from Bab al-Wad or Bab al-Wadi in Arabic (Hebrew: באב אל-ואד, Arabic: باب الواد or باب الوادي), meaning Gate of the Valley, is a point on the Tel Aviv-Jerusalem highway, 23 km from Jerusalem, where the road begins to ascend through a deep valley flanked by steep rocky slopes, of the intermittent Nahshon Stream, or Wadi Ali in Arabic.

== Etymology ==
The Arabic name Bab al-Wad, 'Gate of the Valley', was used in Hebrew as well, as seen in the 1948 song, until after the establishment of the State of Israel and the creation of the Hebrew name, Sha'ar HaGai, a verbatim translation of the Arabic name.

== History ==
=== Ottoman period ===
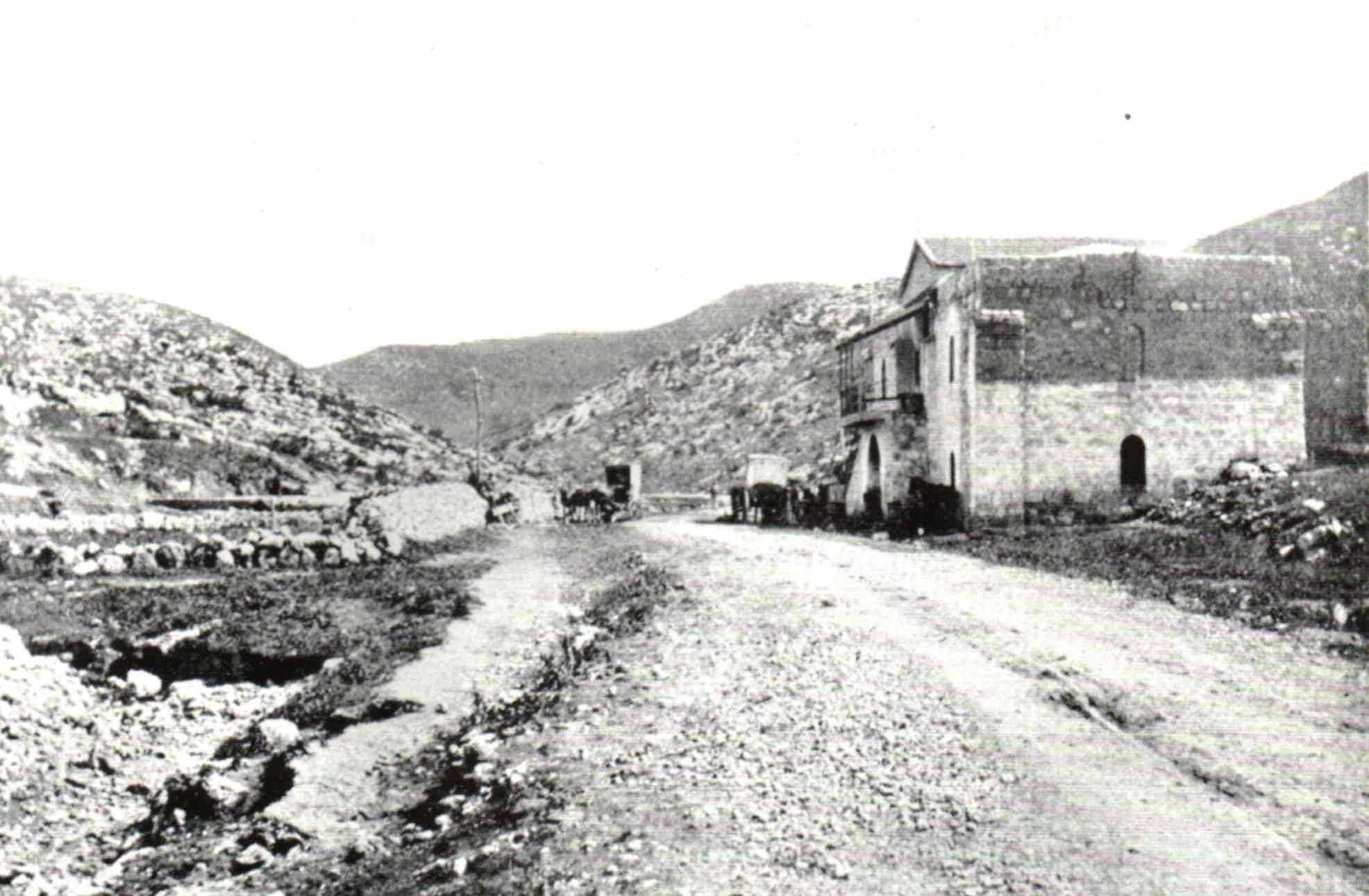
Caravanserai later run by the Warshavsky family, 1910

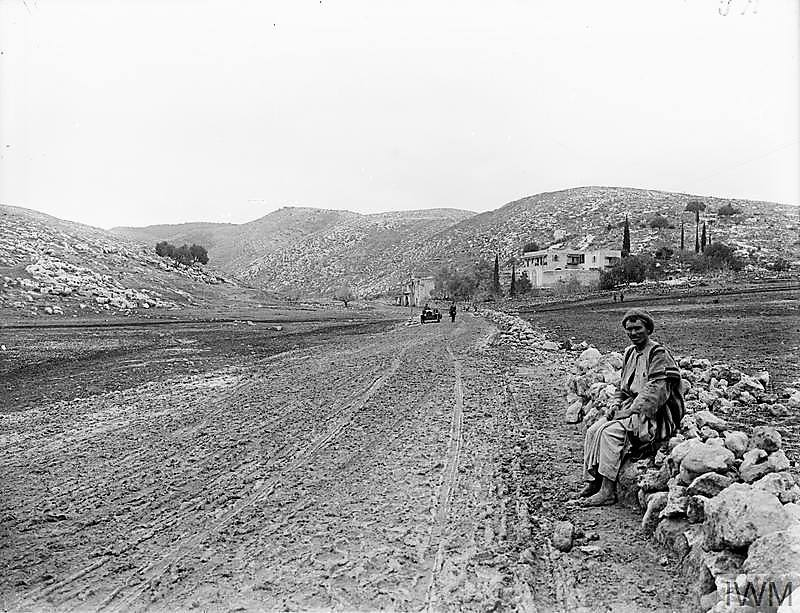
Bab al-Wad in 1917

The Jaffa–Jerusalem road was initially made accessible for wheeled vehicles by the Ottomans in 1867, and since then served as the main highway to Jerusalem, favoured over more topographically convenient routes such as the one following the ridge north of it and known since biblical times as the "ascent of Beth-Horon" (today's Route 443). The journey from Jaffa to Jerusalem was reduced, thanks to this upgrade, from three to two days and Bab al-Wad became the one place where travellers had to stop for the night. For this purpose, the Ottomans built there an inn or caravansary, used soon after, in 1869, the year of the inauguration of the Suez Canal, by travelling royalty taking a detour to Jerusalem such as Franz Joseph I of Austria-Hungary, the future British king Edward VII and his brother-in-law the future German emperor Frederick III. In 1898 the site was used again by German emperor Wilhelm II and his wife Augusta Victoria, who slept there in a tent camp. The largest bell for the church of the Augusta Victoria Foundation, initiated by Wilhelm during his 1898 visit and built between 1907 and 1910, weighed six tonnes and required that the road be widened and paved.

=== British Mandate ===
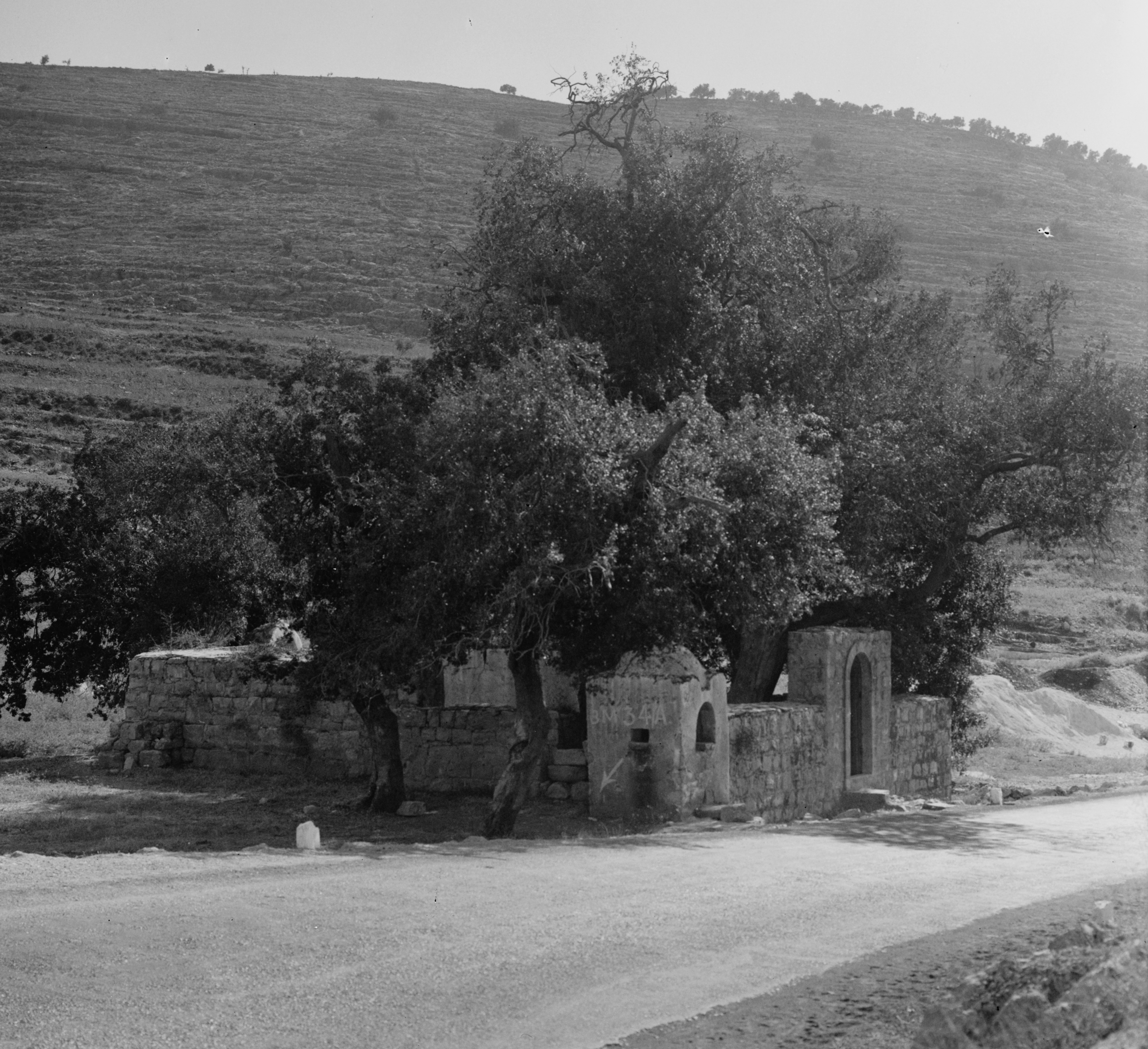
The Maqam (shrine) of Imam Ali, at Bab al-Wad, photographed about 1934-39

After World War I, Todros Warshavsky, a Jew born in Jerusalem in 1877, leased the khan and moved there with his family, offering travelers light meals and care of animals.

=== 1948 war ===
During the 1947–48 Civil War in Mandatory Palestine, this area saw fierce fighting between Arab forces and Jewish convoys on the way to blockaded West Jerusalem. Bab al-Wad and the defile it guards changed hands between the Arab Liberation Army supported by local Arab irregulars, and Jewish Palmach and Haganah units, until April 20 1948, when the Arabs recaptured the heights around Bab al-Wad closing off the Tel Aviv-Jerusalem road.

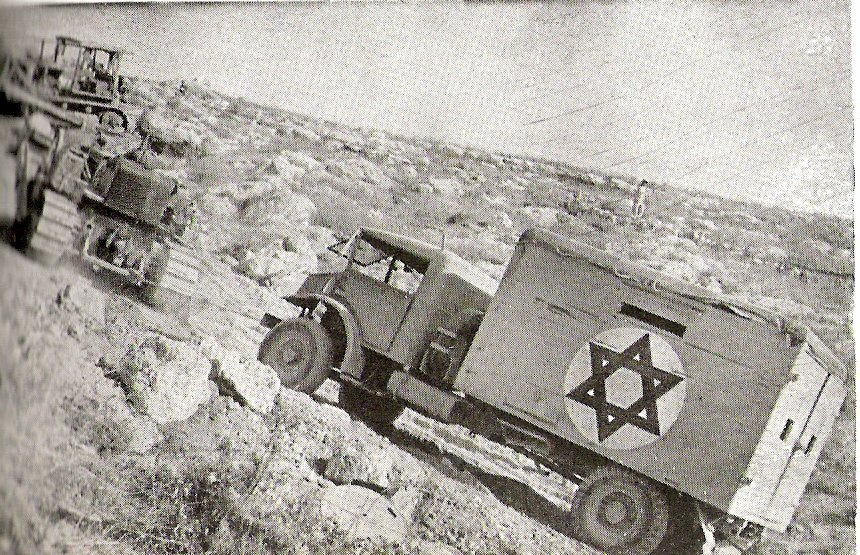
A bulldozer tows a truck on the "Burma Road" to Jerusalem, June 1948

After the beginning of the 1948 Arab-Israeli War, the fort at Latrun, two kilometres west of Bab al-Wad, was held by the Arab Legion, the British-trained and commanded army of Transjordan, thus reinforcing the Arab siege of West Jerusalem. The Palmach's 10th (Harel) Brigade under the command of Lt. Col. Yitzhak Rabin, future prime minister of Israel, managed to capture Bab al-Wad itself, but the road section west of it, controlled from Latrun, remained in Jordanian hands until 1967, cutting off this main access route to Jerusalem. In order to bypass the Arab-held bottleneck, the Israelis constructed the so-called Burma Road, named after the famous World War II road into China. This very steep bypass road was in use during the first, crucial part of the war, being replaced after six months by a longer but safer detour route.

=== State of Israel ===
After the 1967 Arab-Israeli War, when the Latrun area was captured by Israel, the main Tel Aviv–Jerusalem highway was once again constructed on the shortest route past Latrun and Sha'ar HaGai. Today's already four-lane wide Highway 1 is currently (2016) being widened due to increasing traffic, by further carving into the slopes of the Wadi Ali gorge.

== Landmarks ==
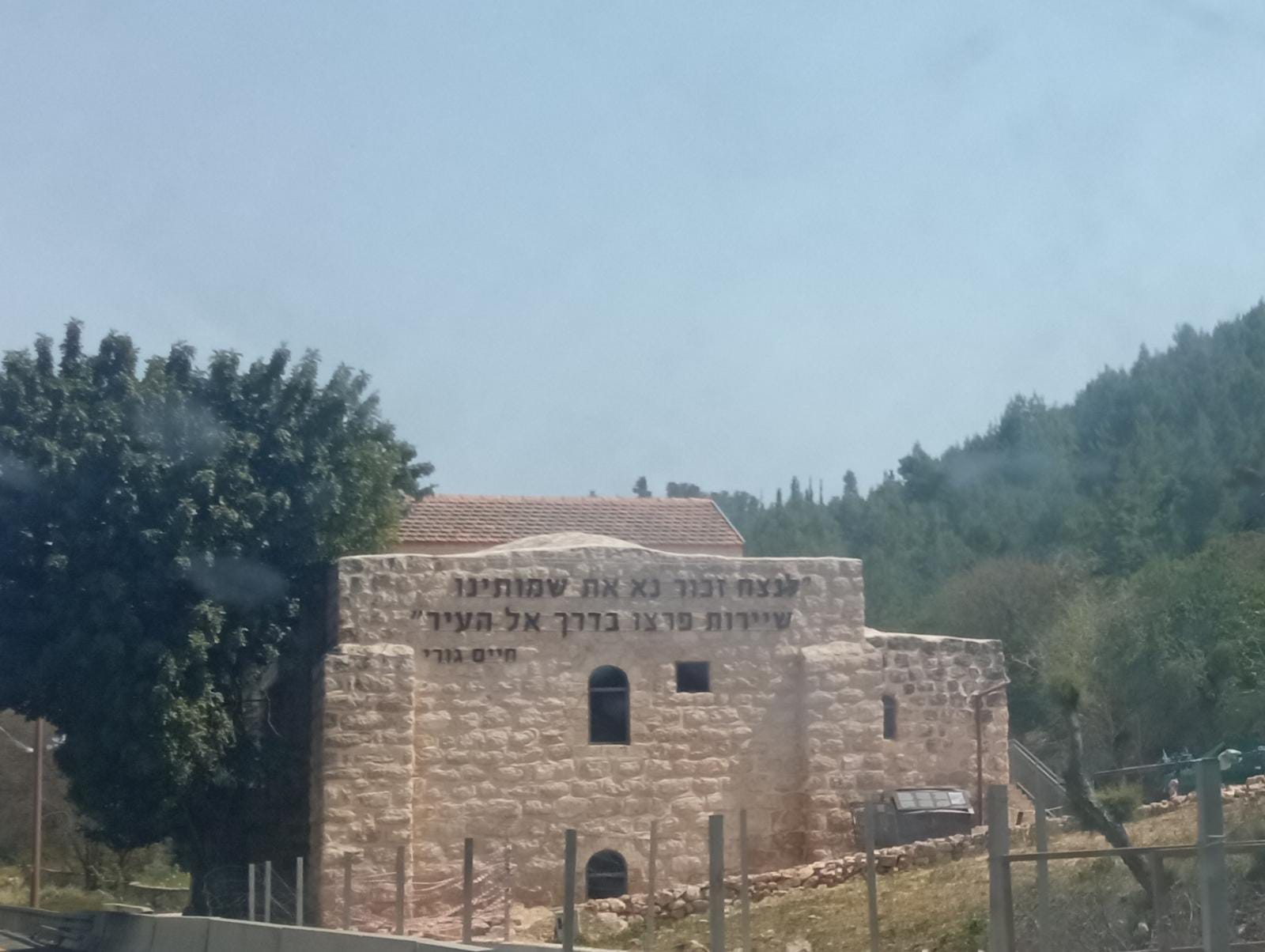
Sha'ar HaGai Khan museum

=== Sandwich trucks ===
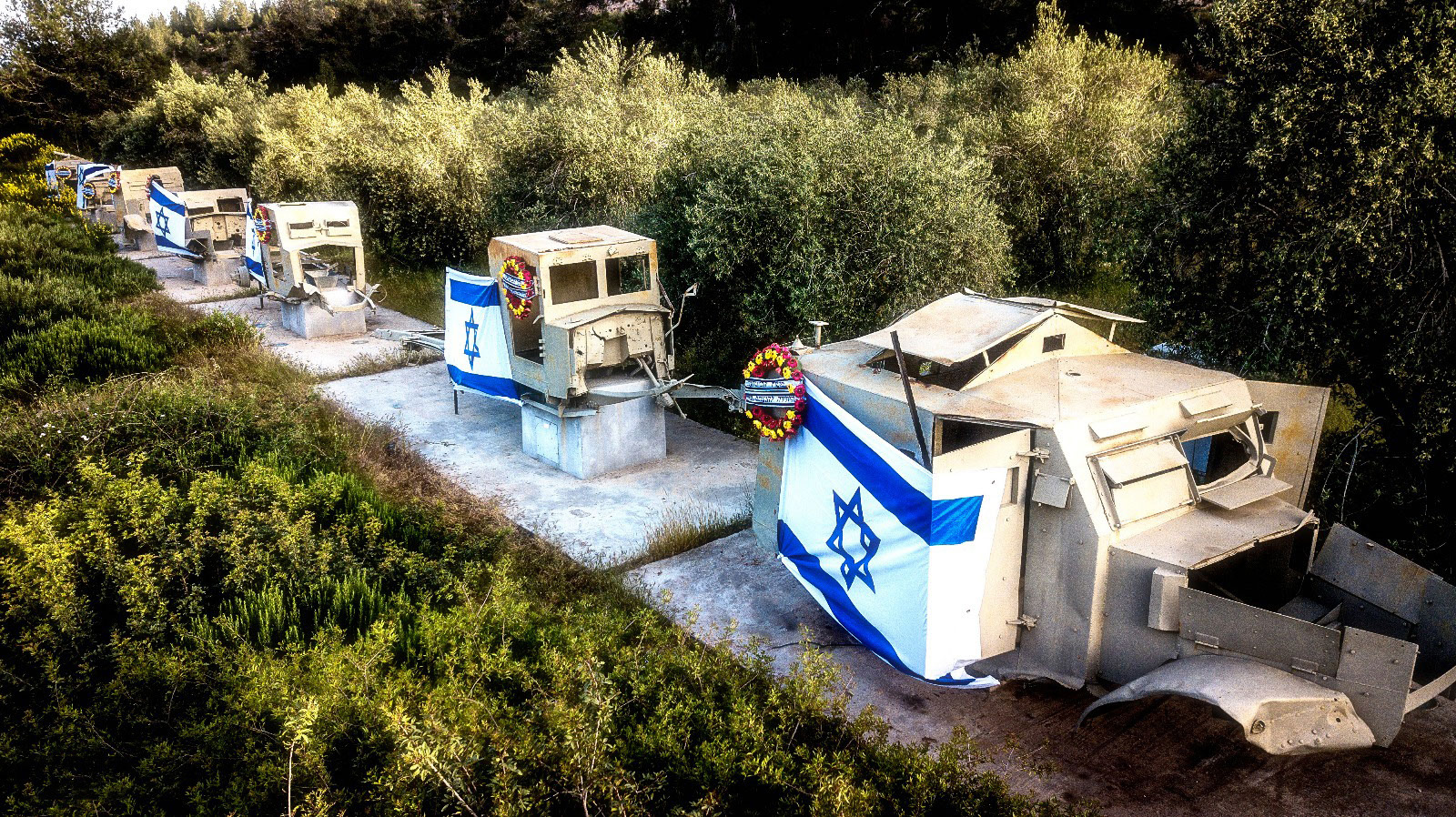
Old armored vehicles ("sandwich trucks") at Sha'ar HaGai

Until the 2000s, the remains of armoured cars that belonged to Jewish convoys and were destroyed during the 1948 war were lining the route as a memorial to the war dead. Most of them were regular trucks with improvised armour made of two sheets of steel and a layer of wood in between, which led to them being called "sandwich trucks". Then they had to be relocated by the army to the two extremities of the gorge, where they have been secured against scrap metal thieves, conserved and displayed on the side of the highway.

=== Mahal Memorial ===
In a park south of the main road is the Mahal Memorial Monument, which commemorates Mahal, the ca. 4000 Jewish and non-Jewish military volunteers who came from abroad to fight in Israel's War of Independence in 1947–48, of whom 119 lost their lives during the fighting.

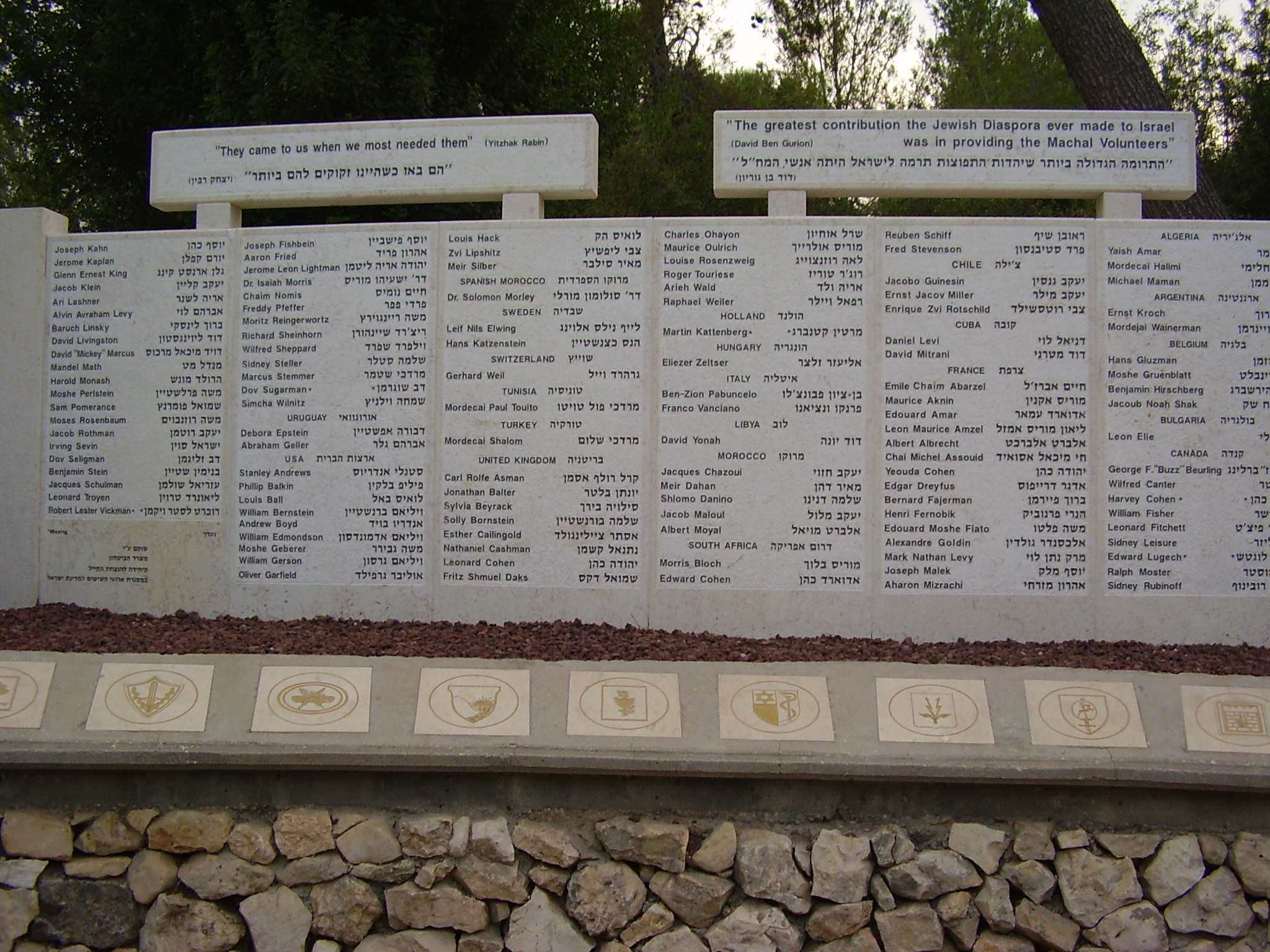
List of Mahal soldiers who fell during the 1948 Arab–Israeli War, Mahal Memorial

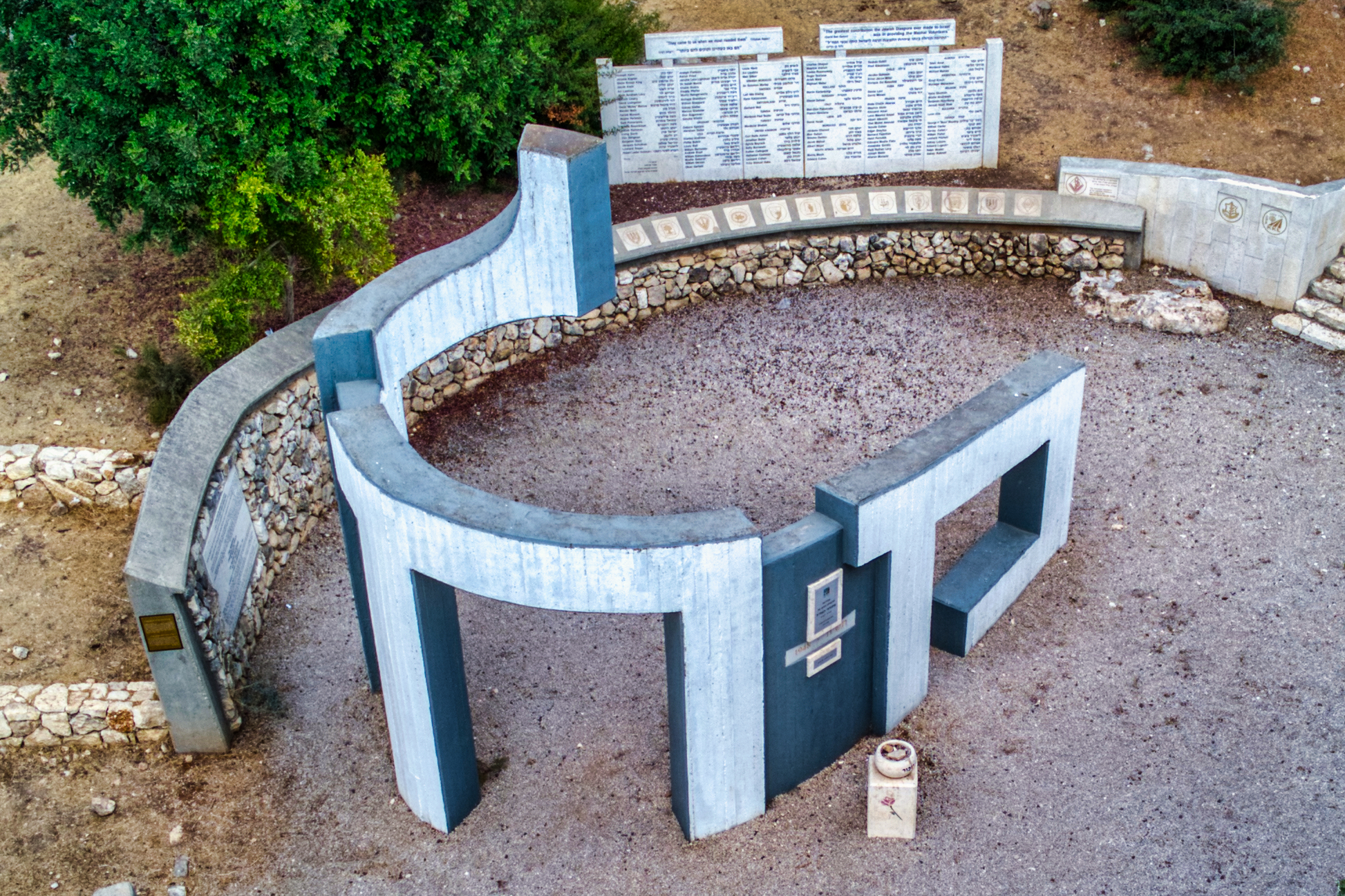
Mahal Memorial

=== Memorial for Jerusalem corridor casualties ===
The Memorial for the Pioneers of the Road to Jerusalem, erected in memory of the Jewish Independence War fighters who died in battles fought over the road to Jerusalem, stands on the side of the highway near Neve Ilan, and Shoresh Interchange. The 1967 work of Israeli sculptor Naomi Henrik is built of stainless steel and concrete and consists of a cluster of tubes resembling rockets that point towards Jerusalem.

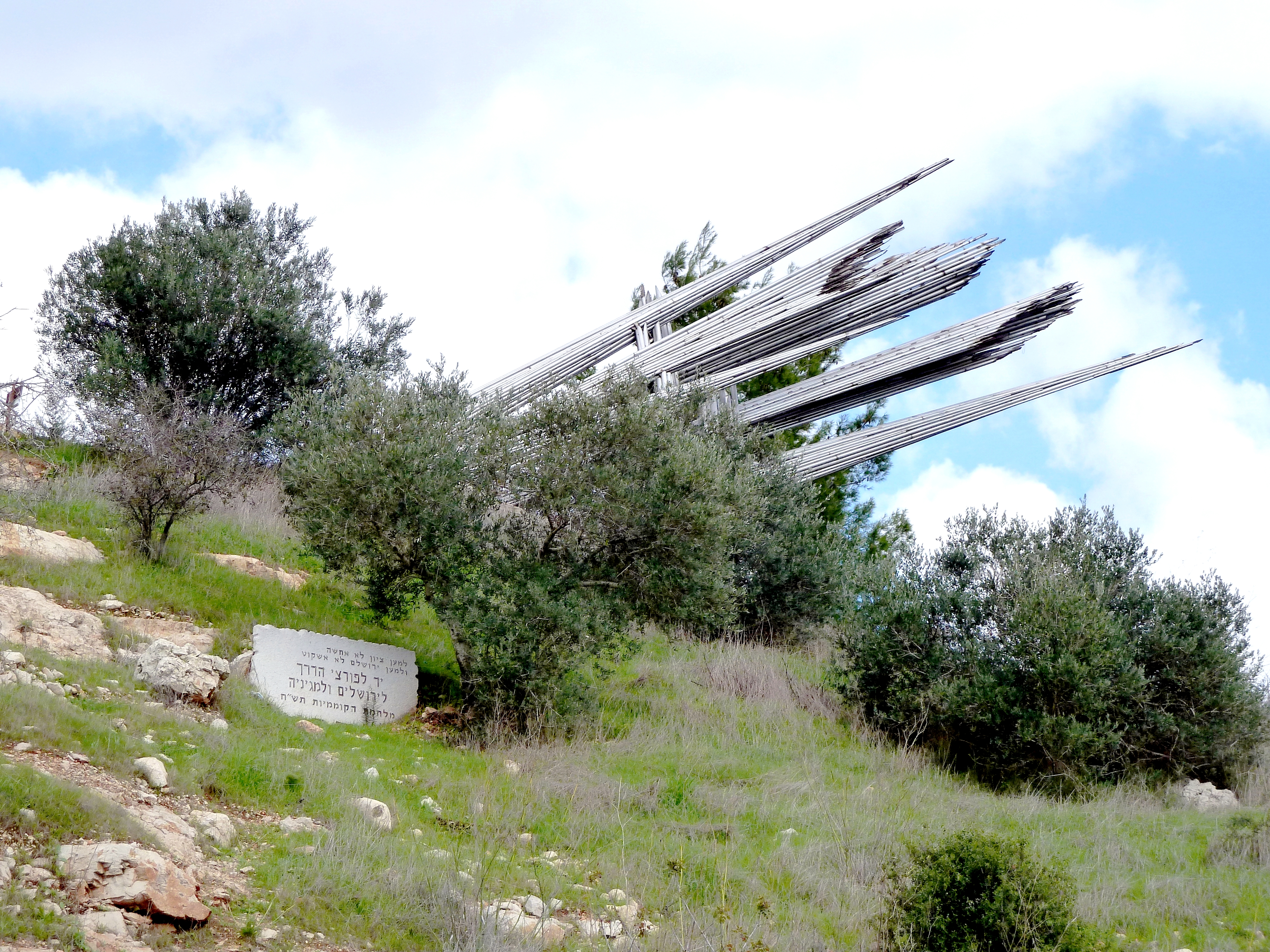
War memorial dedicated to the Jewish casualties of the 1948 battles for the road to Jerusalem (sculptor Naomi Henrik, 1967), overlooking Highway 1

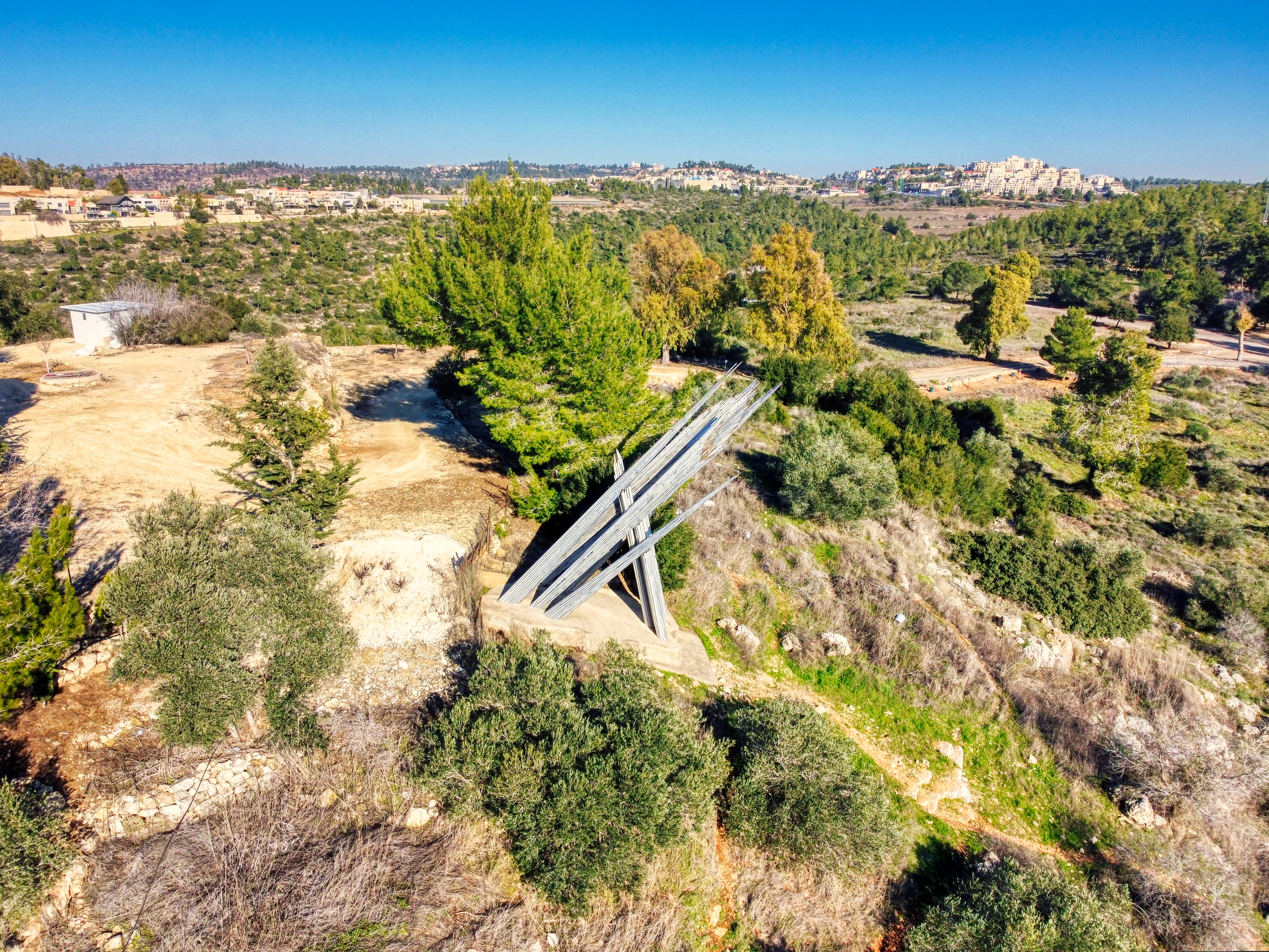
The Memorial from a bird's eye view

== Literary references ==
The battles of 1948 were commemorated by a Hebrew song, Bab al-Wad, with words by Haim Gouri and music by Shmuel Fershko. The song has been performed by numerous famous Israeli singers, such as Yafa Yarkoni, Shoshana Damari, Shlomo Gronich, and Harel Skaat. The song has four verses, with the fourth verse spoken before the final chorus.

Here I walk silently
And I remember them, every single one
Here we fought, together, over cliffs and boulders
Here we were to one family

Bab al Wad
Forever do remember our names
As convoys broke through to the city
On the roadsides lie our dead
The iron hulk as silent as my comrade

Israelis referring to the location in daily life call it by the Hebrew name Sha'ar HaGai (שער הגיא) in Hebrew, but the famous song calls it by the Arabic name Bab al-Wad - preserving the fact that in 1948, the soldiers of the young Israel called it that. Both the Hebrew and Arabic name mean the same - "Gate of the Valley".

== Gallery ==
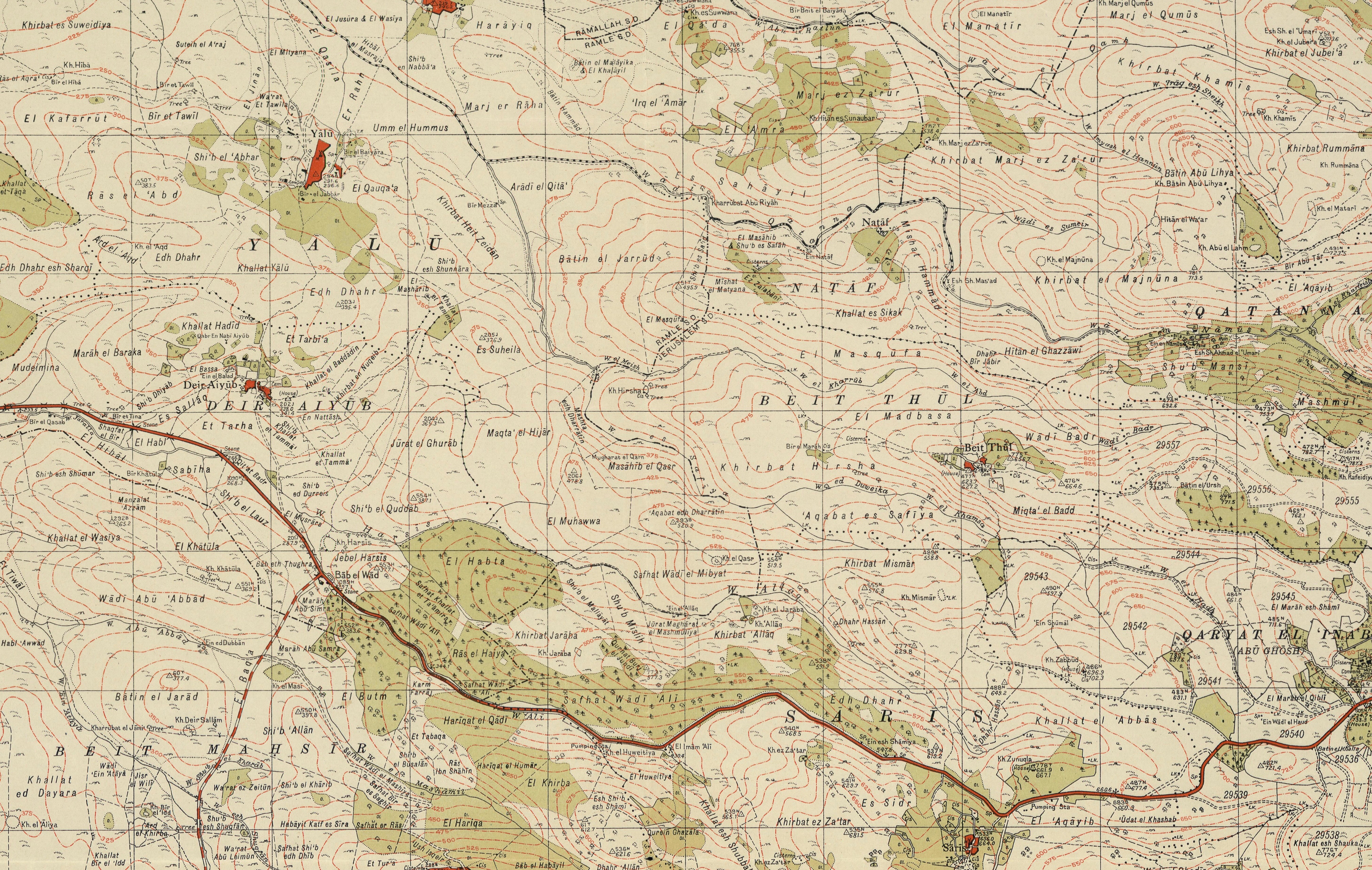
Bab el Wad 1943 1:20,000 (lower left quadrant)

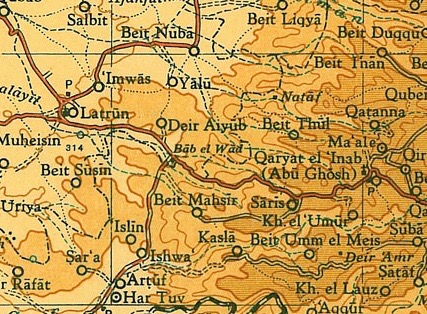
Bad el Wad 1945 1:250,000

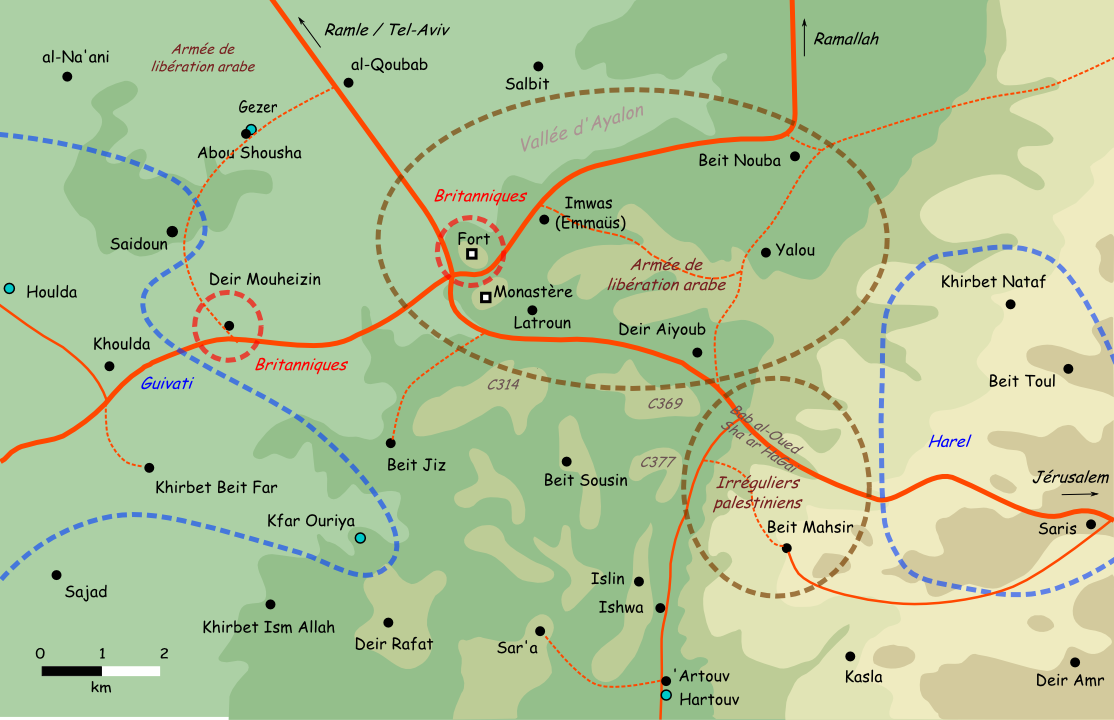
Position of forces 10 May 1948 (Bab el Oued)

== See also ==
- Battle for Jerusalem (December 1947 - July 1948)
- Jerusalem corridor, the wider area that contains Bab al-Wad/Sha'ar HaGai and the Wadi Ali gorge
- Operation Ha-Har of the Israeli army in October 1948, leading to the IDF taking control of the Jerusalem corridor
