= Subasic =

Subasic may refer to:

- Subašić, South Slavic surname
- Šubašić, South Slavic surname
