= Makhzoumi =

Makhzoumi is a surname. Notable people with the surname include:

- Fouad Makhzoumi (born 1952), UK-based Lebanese businessman and politician
- Ziad Makhzoumi (born 1955), Lebanese-British businessman
