= Soubashi =

Ottoman gubernatorial title

The soubashi (Turkish: subaşı, Albanian: subash, Serbo-Croatian: subaša) was an Ottoman gubernatorial title used to describe different positions within the Ottoman hierarchy, depending on the context. This title was given to Ottoman timar holders who generated more than 15,000 aspers per annum or to the assistants of the sanjak-bey. The term was also used for the commander of the town or castle in the Ottoman Empire, an ancient version of chief of police. In the Belgrade Pashalik, where the Janissaries (known as Dahije) wrested control of the province from the Vizier (1801), they appointed soubashi in Serb villages, breaking the traditional self-governing rights.

A surname found among Balkan families, Subaša or Subašić, is derived from the title.

== Sources ==
- Ćirković, Sima (2004). The Serbs. Malden: Blackwell Publishing. ISBN 9781405142915.
