= Ziad al-Khasawneh =

Jordanian lawyer

Ziyad Al-Khasawneh is a Jordanian lawyer who headed a team of over 3000 defense lawyers for former Iraqi President Saddam Hussein. He resigned as head of the defense team on July 7, 2005, after a dispute with Saddam Hussein's daughter, Raghad.
