= Yafa Yarkoni =

Israeli singer (1925-2012)

Yafa Yarkoni יפה ירקוני
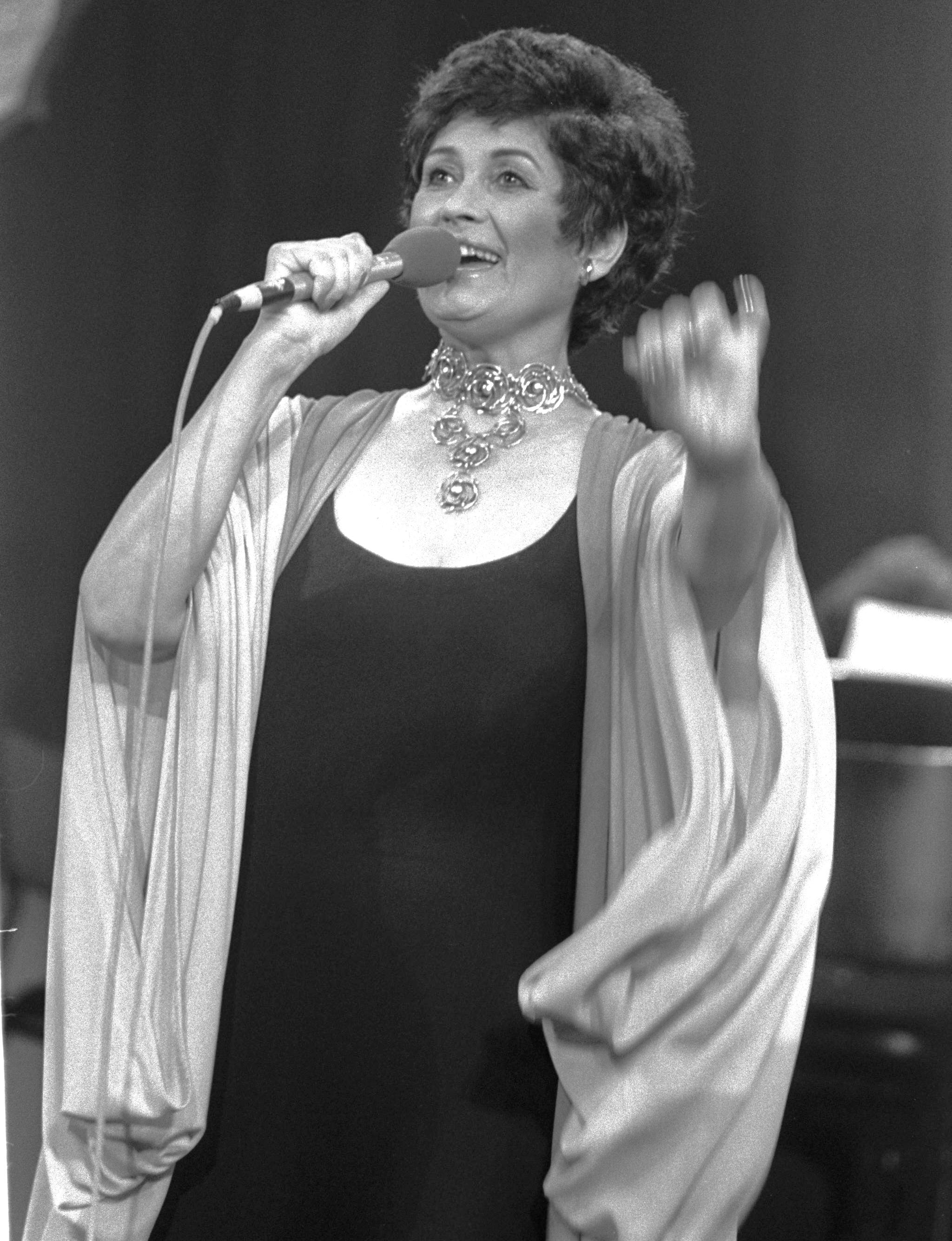

Background information
- Also known as: The "Songstress of the Wars"
- Born: Yafa Abramov; 24 December 1925; Giv'at Rambam, British Mandate for Palestine
- Died: 1 January 2012 (aged 86) Reut Medical Center, Tel Aviv, Israel
- Occupation: Singer
- Instrument: Vocals

Yafa Yarkoni (Hebrew: יפה ירקוני, also Yaffa Yarqoni, 24 December 1925 – 1 January 2012) was an Israeli singer. She won the Israel Prize in 1998 for her contributions to Hebrew music. She was dubbed Israel's "songstress of the wars" due to her frequent performances for Israel Defense Forces (IDF) soldiers, especially in wartime.

== Biography ==
=== Early years ===
Yarkoni was born Yafa Abramov in southern Tel Aviv to a Mountain Jewish family, that had immigrated from the Caucasus.

Yarkoni was the middle child in a family of three, with an older sister, Tikva (born in 1921), and a younger brother, Benjamin (born in 1927). When she was eight years old, her parents divorced, and her father relocated to Southern Rhodesia, leaving the family in financial hardship.

In the 1930s, she moved with her mother and brother to Givat Rambam, now part of Givatayim, where her mother established a café-restaurant called "Tzlil" ("Sound"), which became popular, particularly among security personnel and artists. She performed alongside her siblings at Tzlil.

Yarkoni began her artistic career at a young age. She and her siblings formed a group called Bamati, an acronym derived from the initials of the four family members, that would perform at their mother's restaurant. Yarkoni's sister Tikva would sing, her brother Benjamin would play piano, and Yarkoni herself would dance.

The group gained popularity among the cafe's patrons, and following a recommendation from singer and actor Shmuel Fisher, Yarkoni was accepted to study classical dance at Gertrud Kraus's studio. There, she also learned to play the piano and later joined Kraus's dance troupe, which was associated with the Palestine National Opera. She performed with the troupe for 12 years until a leg injury during a 1945 performance ended her dancing career.

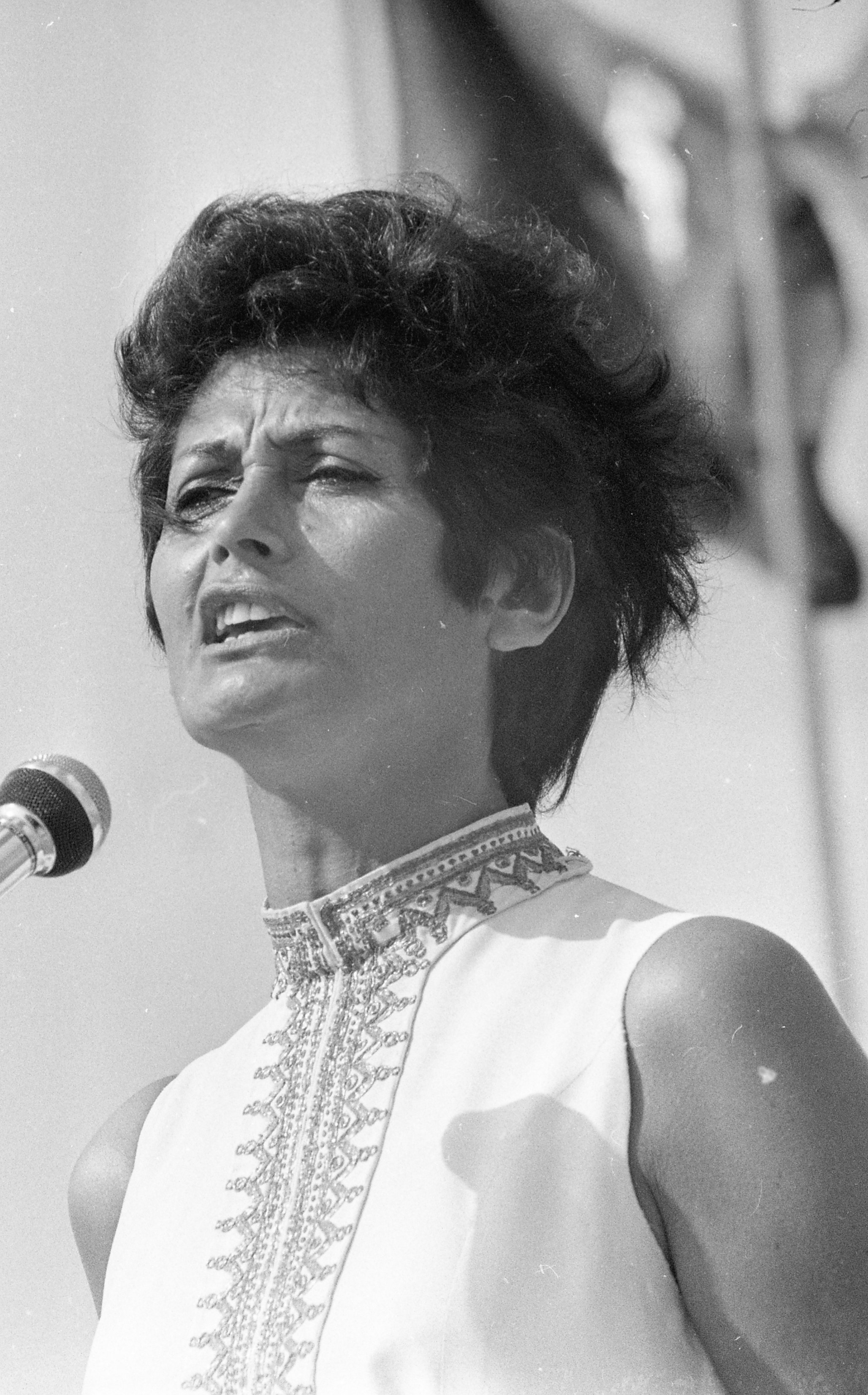
Yarkoni

In late 1947, Yarkoni enlisted in the Haganah as a radio operator. During the 1947-1949 Palestine War, she served in the Givati Brigade and began singing with the brigade's entertainment troupe, "Ha-Hishtron." Songs written for the troupe by Toli Reviv and Bobby Panhassi, including "Don't Tell Me Goodbye," "Sharhoret," and "It Only Happened This Time," became associated with Yarkoni. Two songs she performed during this time, "Ha'amini Yom Yavo" and "Bab al-Wad," became symbols of the war. "Ha'amini Yom Yavo," introduced to her by actor Raphael Kalchkin, was first sung for convoy escorts to Jerusalem. "Bab al-Wad," written by Haim Gouri in memory of the convoy escorts, gained prominence about a year after the fighting ended.

=== Singing career ===
In 1948, Yarkoni recorded a successful album at the Radio Doctor studio. Among its tracks, the song "Green Eyes," often considered the first Israeli pop song, gained widespread popularity. She subsequently signed with the newly established record label Hed Artzi, where she recorded all her albums.

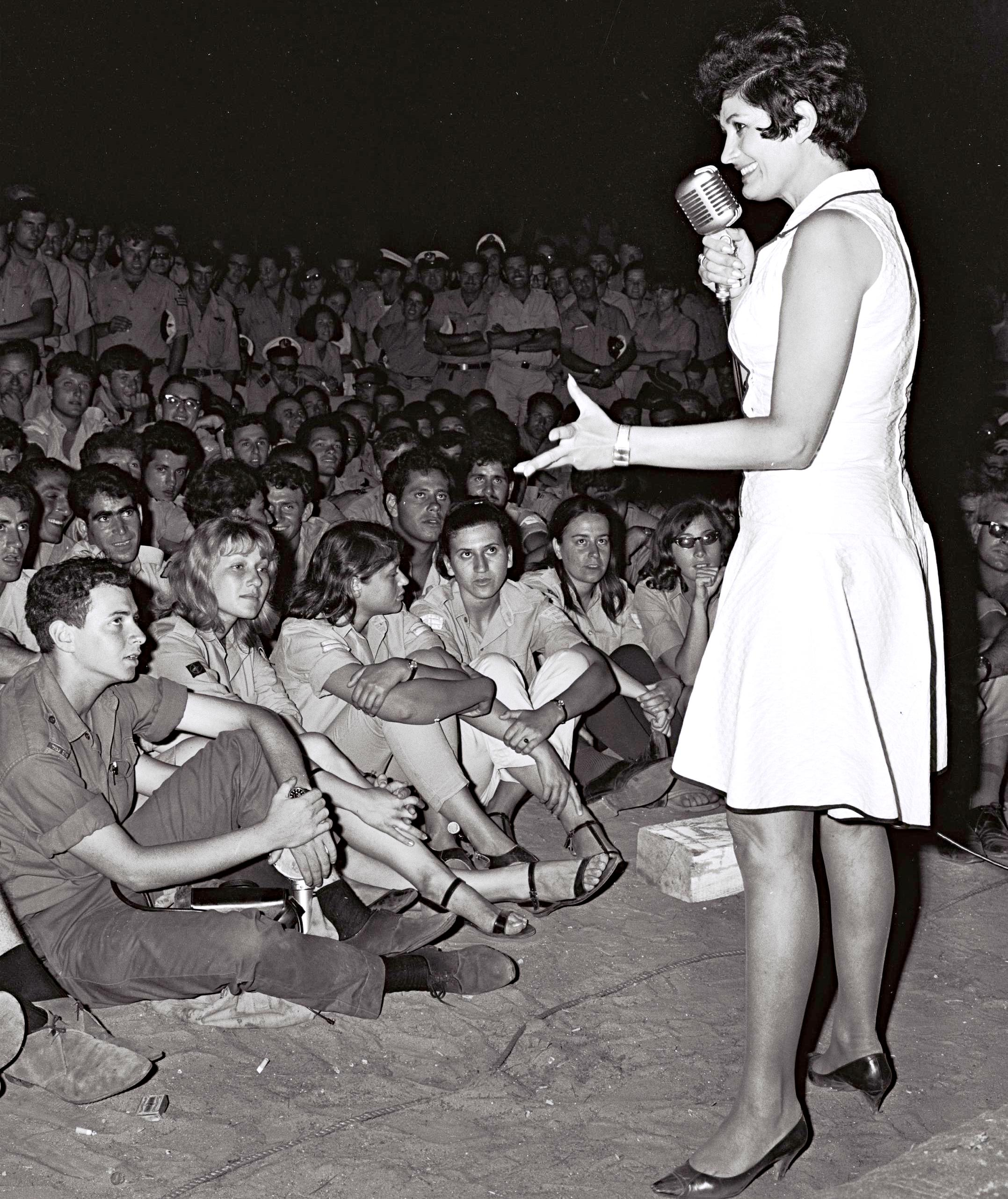
Yaffa Yarkoni entertaining troops in an army camp

One of her early albums, Bab al-Wad, comprised songs from the 1948 Palestine War, including "Ha'amini Yom Yavo," which she had performed during the war, and tracks like "Gentlemen, History Returns," "Hafinjan," "Han Pasha," "Dudo," and "Zano At." These songs became more closely associated with Yarkoni than with their original performers, the Ha-Hishtron troupe. In 1951, she released a successful album of Israeli folk dance songs.

During the 1950s and 1960s, Yarkoni emerged as a leading Israeli singer. Many of her national songs, such as "In the Negev Steppes" (lyrics by Raphael Kalchkin) and "The Grandmother in the Negev" (lyrics: Avshalom Cohen) and "The Grandmother in the Negev" (lyrics by Avshalom Cohen), were frequently broadcast on Kol Yisrael's As You Request Hebrew Songs.

She also found success with salon music, including waltz and tango pieces, which were popular for dancing in cafes. Her 1959 album, Nirkoda Im Yafa Yarkoni, included hits like "Habibi," "Arzeno HaKtanah," and "Sh'Harhoret."

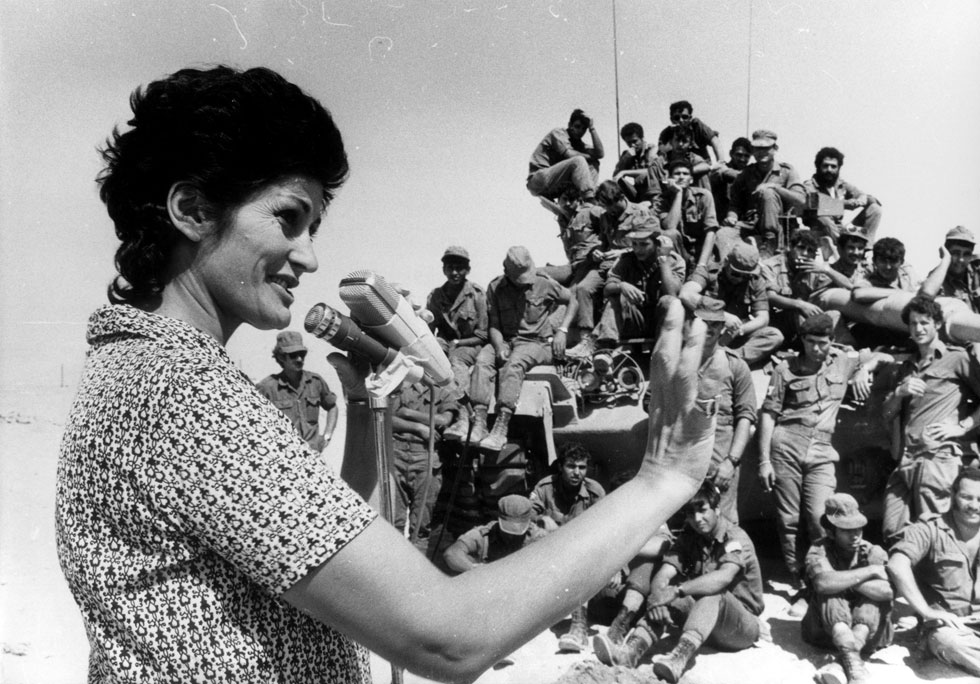
Yafa Yarkoni performing in front of soldiers in the Sinai Peninsula

Despite media portrayals of a rivalry with fellow singer Shoshana Damari, Yarkoni and Damari collaborated on several occasions. Yarkoni recorded children's music during the 1950s, including the 1953 album Children's Songs as You Request, which featured Avshalom Cohen's "A Cart with a Horse" and Yehiel Mohar's "Dubon Yambo." Her 1957 album Shirim MiKinneret, dedicated to Naomi Shemer's children's songs, introduced Shemer's work to a broader audience, with songs such as "The Mail Comes Today" and "Ahinu Little Brother".

Yarkoni also released a record of holiday songs for children. One of Yarkoni's most notable children's songs was "Aba Shlei" ("My father has a ladder..."), written by Thelma Eligon.

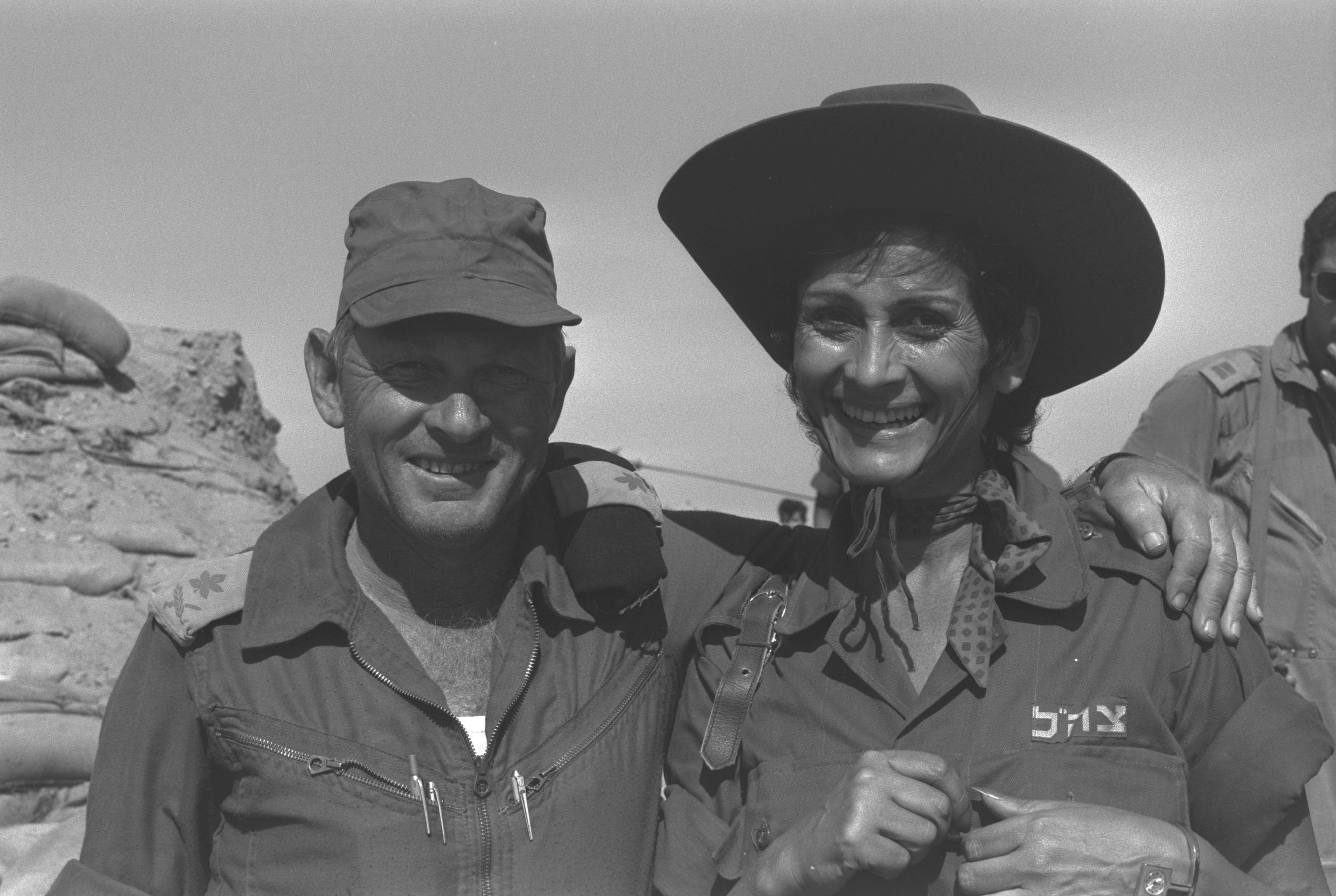
Yafa Yarkoni with Dan Avraham

Yarkoni won first place at the 1965 Singer and Chorus Festival with "Ayelet Ha'Hen", and again in 1966 with "Autumn Night." During the 1960s and 1970s, she performed internationally in venues such as Carnegie Hall, Lincoln Center, L'Olympia, and the London Palladium. She also spent four years in the United States, recording three albums and performing extensively. In Paris, Yarkoni met Boaz Sharabi and recorded his song "Pamela" for the first time.

In 1969, Yarkoni performed "When We Were Children" (written by Uri Assaf and composed by Moshe Wilensky) on a television special for Yom Ha'atzmaut, which became one of her signature songs. During the 1970s, she recorded pop songs, including "All the Pigeons" (1971) and "Erev Stav Yaffe" (1976), a duet with Svika Pick. (1976). She performed with Pick in a joint show, which was unsuccessful.

She also participated in the Children's Song Festival thrice during the 1970s, performing the hits "En Den Dino," "I Like to Whistle," and "My Little Sister."

In 1986, her career was celebrated in the program Such a Life. Between 1991 and 1992, she appeared with her son-in-law Meir Suisa in the children's TV series Hag Sameah with Yafa Yarkoni. Each episode was broadcast on one of the holidays.In 1994, she took on a supporting role in the film The Siren's Song, based on Irit Linur's book. In 1996, she released the duet album Singing with Yafa Yarkoni, featuring collaborations with artists including Shoshana Damari, Aric Einstein, and Chava Alberstein.

In 1998, Yarkoni received the Israel Prize for her contributions to Hebrew music. That same year, a five-volume collection of her songs, Yafa Yarkoni: Since Then Until Now, 1948–1998, was published, including a new piece by Naomi Shemer inspired by Yarkoni's life. She performed as a guest artist at the 1999 Festigal and recorded her final song, "Now It's Been Years (and It's Hard to Remember)," in 2000. A triple collection of 62 hits was released that year.

Throughout her career, Yarkoni collaborated extensively with songwriters Tuli Reviv and Haim Hefer.

=== Final years and death ===
In 2000, Yarkoni was diagnosed with Alzheimer's disease. In December 2006, a large tribute evening was organized for Yarkoni at the Heichal HaTarbut, featuring performances by numerous artists. In 2007, she made her final television appearance on a program produced in her honor by the Israel Broadcasting Authority.

Yarkoni died on January 1, 2012, at the age of 86 in Reut Medical Center in Tel Aviv. She was buried next to her husband Sheika in the Kiryat Shaul Cemetery.

== Personal life ==
=== Politics ===
Yarkoni was frequently performed for soldiers during Israel's wars and in peacetime. Her willingness to perform at the front lines of battles earned her the nickname "Singer of the Wars," a title she reportedly disliked, preferring instead to be called "The Soldiers' Singer."

Yarkoni was also outspoken about her political views, which were often associated with the Zionist left. In 2002, during Operation Defensive Shield, she made comments on Israeli Army Radio's What's Burning program criticizing the marking of numbers on the arms of Palestinians by IDF soldiers. She stated, "We are a people that went through the Holocaust, how are we able to do such things?" These remarks were widely interpreted by the media as a comparison between the actions of the IDF and the identification of inmates in Nazi concentration camps.

Yarkoni later claimed that she was not equating the two, but her statement triggered a media controversy, with some right-wing groups calling for a boycott. She received threats and hate mail, and an event in her honor organized by the Israel Artists Union was initially canceled. After the controversy subsided, the Union of Israeli Artists later held an event in her honor.

=== Family ===
Yarkoni married Joseph Gustin on September 21, 1944. The day after their wedding, Gustin volunteered for the British Army, serving in the Jewish Brigade during World War II. He was killed on March 29, 1945, during the campaign on the Senio River in Italy.

The song "Uri," written by Raphael Kalchkin and composed by Issachar Miron, was performed by Yarkoni in memory of her deceased husband. In 1945, Yarkoni's mother and younger brother also adopted the surname "Gustin" as a tribute to her late husband.

In 1948, Yarkoni married Shaika Yarkoni, originally from Tel Aviv. Shaika was also a member of the Haganah and later became a businessman. The couple had three daughters: Orit (1950), Tamar (1953) and Ruth (1956) and eight grandchildren, including Michael Swissa. Shaika Yarkoni died August 29, 1983. Their eldest daughter, Orit Shohat, is a former Haaretz journalist.

Yarkoni had three brothers. Her sister, Tikva Handel, recorded several songs in 1947, accompanied by Nahum Nardi and Shmuel Fershko. Handel later relocated to Caracas, where she established a Jewish school. She eventually immigrated to the United States and settled in New York.

== Recognition and commemoration ==
- 1989: Awarded the Union of Israeli Artists award.
- 1998: Received the Israel Prize for Hebrew Song.
- Honored as "The City's Dear" of Tel Aviv.

In May 2014, a memorial plaque was installed at the entrance to her former home at 23 Dov Hoz Street in Tel Aviv. Streets were named after her in the cities of Holon, Afula, Kiryat Bialik, Kiryat Motzkin, Rosh HaAyin and Rishon LeZion. In Givatayim, a square at the intersection of Remez and Rambam streets was named after her.

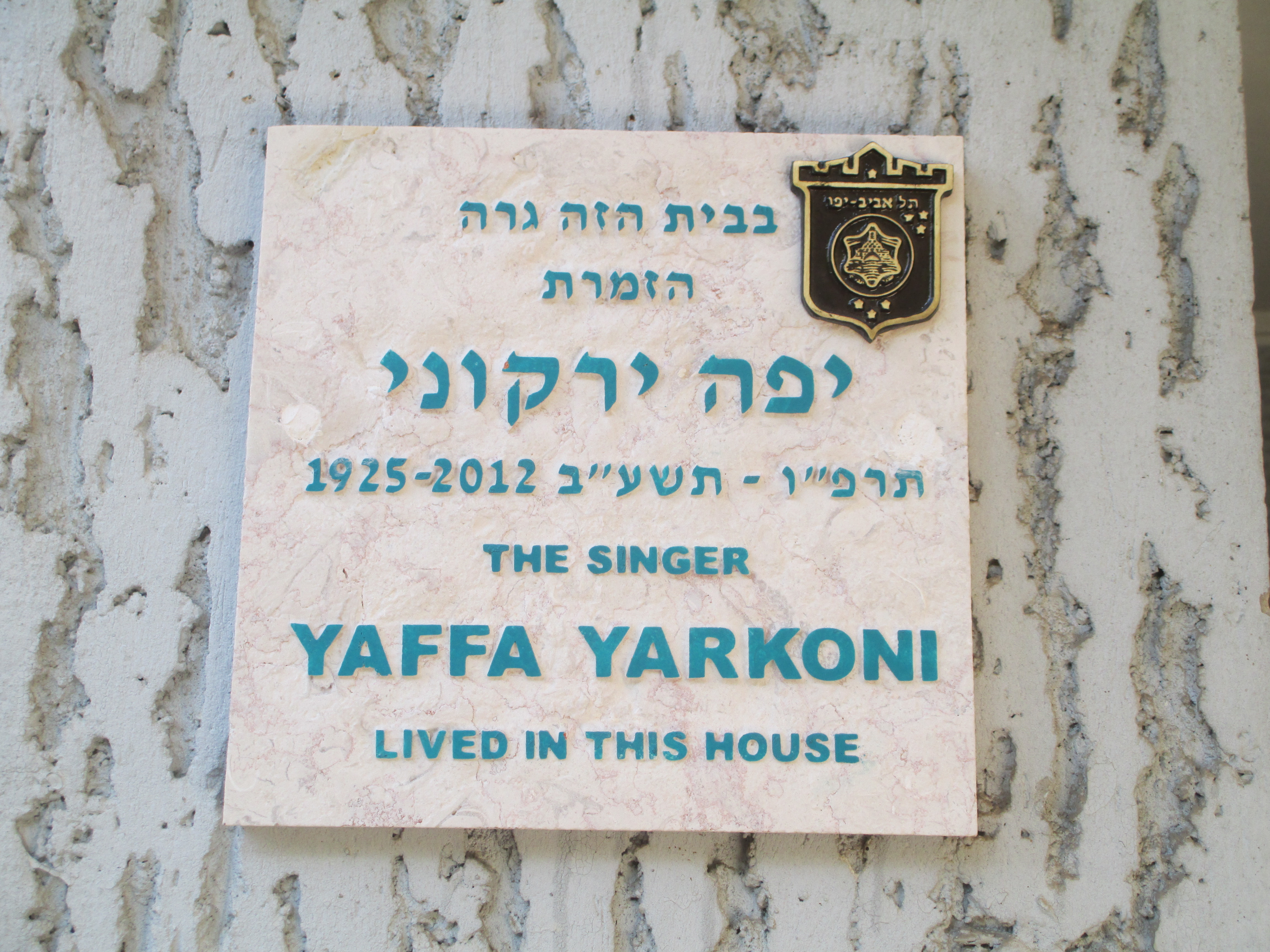
Memorial plaque to Yarkoni in Tel Aviv

In 2018, an exhibition dedicated to Yarkoni was held at the Hava gallery in Holon. The exhibition included items from her life, such as diaries, album covers, photographs, dresses, jewelry, and other fashion accessories.

Her archives are preserved in the music department of the National Library of Israel in Jerusalem.

In 2021, the Tel Aviv-Yafo Municipality inaugurated a new inclusive elementary school in the northern part of the city, named in her honor.

== See also ==
- List of Israel Prize recipients
- Music of Israel
