= Naomi Henrik =

Israeli aculptor

- נעמי הנריק
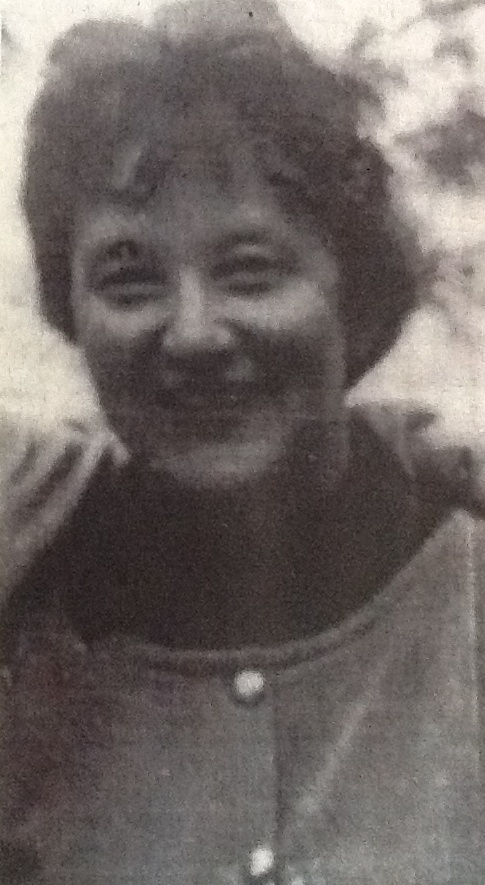
- Naomi Henrik, 1962
- Born: Naomi Tzalering/Zellering; June 11, 1920; Akkerman, Bessarabia
- Died: March 23, 2018 (aged 97); Ein Kerem, Israel
- Education: Slade School of Fine Art
- Known for: Sculpture, Memorial for the Pioneers of the Road to Jerusalem
- Notable work: Monument for the Pathbreakers to Jerusalem, Monument to the Martyrs of the 679th Brigade
- Spouse: Ron Henrik
- Children: Ruthie Henrik-Steinitz
- Awards: Defense Ministry Prize for War of Independence Monument (1964), Monument Design Prize, Yad Vashem (1965)

Naomi Henrik (Hebrew: נעמי הנריק, sometimes Noemi Hanreck) (née Tzalering/Zellering; June 11, 1920 - March 23, 2018) was an Israeli sculptor. She is best known for the Memorial for the Pioneers of the Road to Jerusalem ("Monument for the Pathbreakers to Jerusalem") on a hill overseeing Sha'ar HaGai.

== Biography ==
Naomi Henrik was born in the city of Akkerman in Bessarabia to the family of gynecologist Dr. Shaul Zellering (Russian: Цалеринг, Tzalering). In 1930, she and her family immigrated to the Land of Israel.

She studied at the Herzliya Hebrew Gymnasium and the Levinsky College of Education, Tel Aviv. She studied sculpture with Zeev Ben-Zvi in Jerusalem and in 1945 she moved to London to continue her studies in sculpture at the Slade School of Fine Art.

During World War II, she met her future husband Ron, and they were married in 1945. They had a daughter, Ruthie Henrik-Steinitz. From 1971-72, she headed the Artists' House in Jerusalem.

== Death ==
Naomi Henrik died at her home in Ein Kerem.

== Work ==
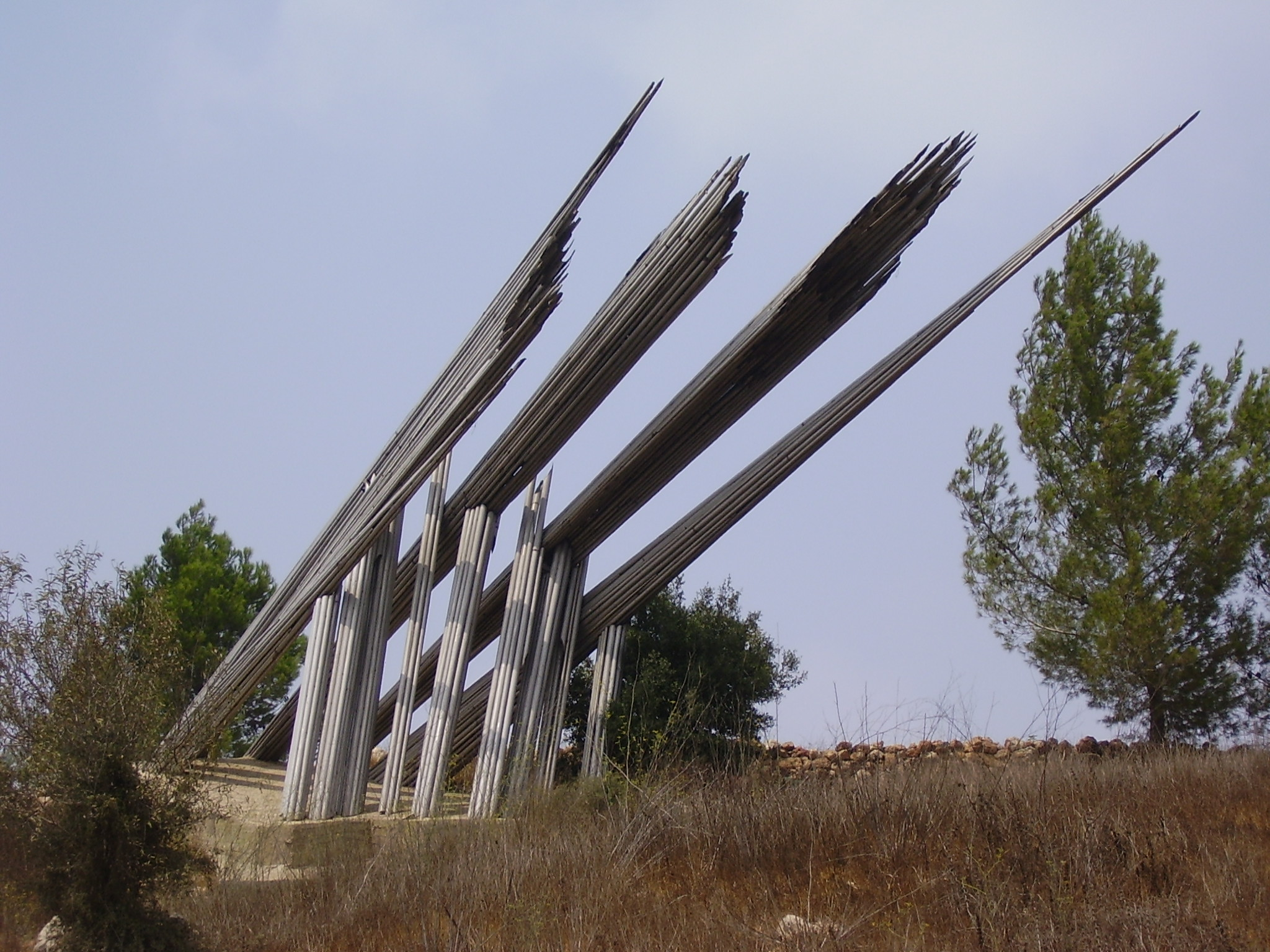
Monument for the Pathbreakers to Jerusalem

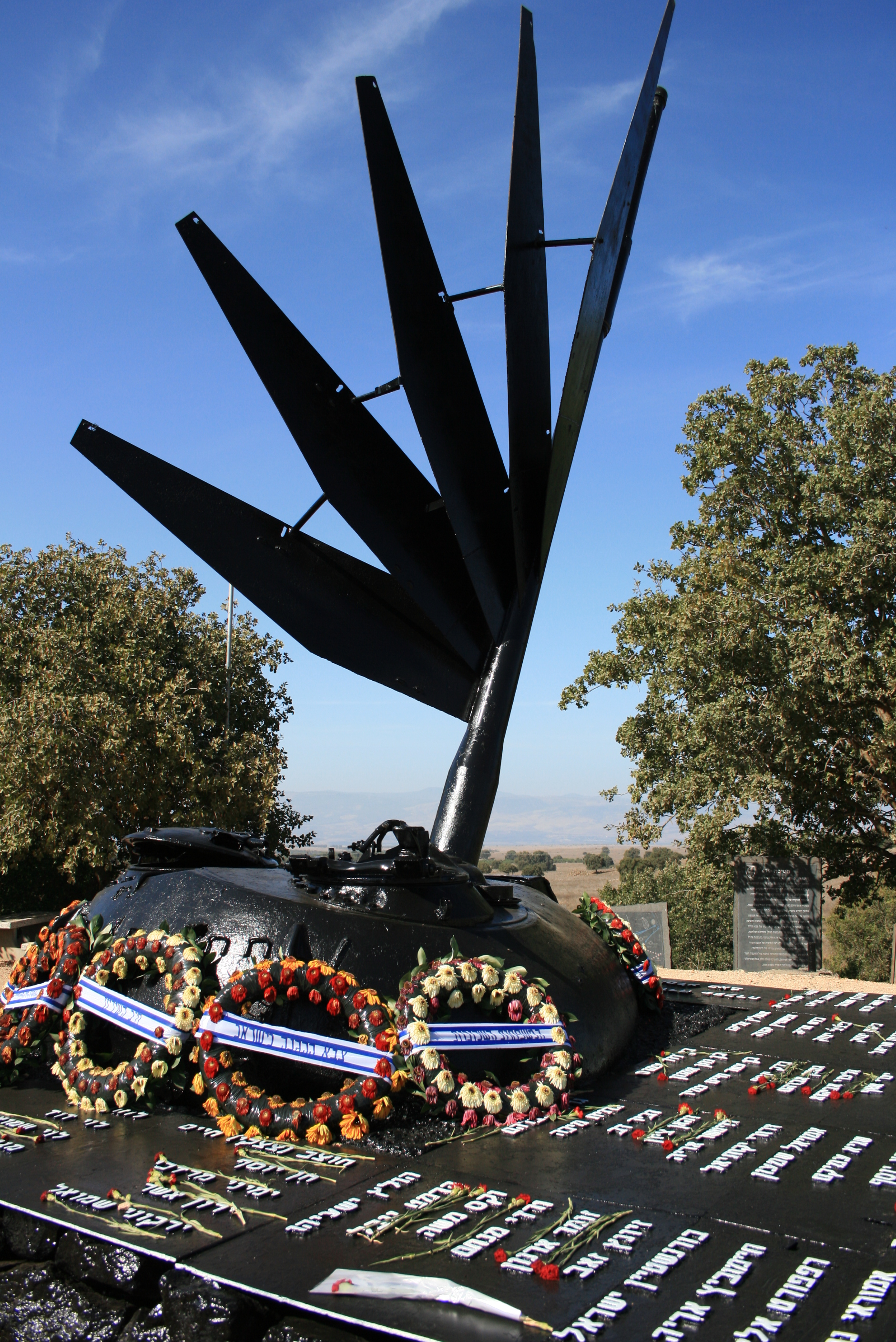
Monument to the Martyrs of the 679th Brigade

1974: Monument to the Martyrs of the 679th Brigade

1967: Memorial for the Pioneers of the Road to Jerusalem ("Monument for the Pathbreakers to Jerusalem")

1962: she won the competition for the monument at Yad Vashem "to symbolize the heroism of the Jews during the Holocaust" (The runner-up was Nathan Rapoport), but unfortunately her project was never realized and eventually in 1970 the Pillar of Heroism by Buky Schwartz was erected instead.

She also devoted herself to works in mosaic.

== Awards ==
- 1964: Defense Ministry Prize for War of Independence Monument
- 1965: Monument Design Prize, Yad Vashem, Jerusalem
