= Zayed =

Zayed may refer to:

== People ==
=== Given name ===
- Zayed Al-Ameri (born 1997), Emirati footballer
- Zayed Al-Hammadi (born 1996), Emirati footballer
- Zayed al-Nahayan (1948–2022), second president of the United Arab Emirates
- Zayed bin Khalifa Al Nahyan (1835–1909), ruler of Abu Dhabi from 1855 to 1909 (Zayed I)
- Zayed Khan (born 1980), Indian actor and producer
- Zayed Khan (Bangladeshi actor) (born 1980)
- Zayed bin Sultan Al Nahyan (1918–2004), founding father of the United Arab Emirates (Zayed II)
- Zayed Khan (born 1980), Indian actor

=== Surname ===
- Éamon Zayed (born 1983), Irish-Libyan footballer

== Places ==
- Zayed City, Abu Dhabi, UAE
- Zayed University, in the UAE

== See also ==
- Zaid and Zayd, an Arabic masculine name
- Ziad, an Arabic given name and surname
- Order of Zayed, UAE's highest civil decoration
