= Ziyad al-A'djam =

Ziyad al-A'djam was an Arabic poet of the Umayyad period. Of Persian origin, he was a mawla of the Amir b. al-Harith, a branch of the Abd al-Kays. Ziyad owed his nickname, "al-A'djam," to his strong Persian accent. According to anecdotes told in the Aghani, his grammar and pronunciation of spoken Arabic was not ideal.
