= Zayd Salih al-Faqih =

Yemeni writer

Zayd Salih al-Faqih is a Yemeni short story writer, journalist and essayist. He was born in a village in Ibb Governorate in 1964, and studied Arabic language at Sanaa University. He then continued his studies at the University of Dhamar. He worked at the Yemeni ministry of culture, becoming the head of press and communication. He has published a number of short story collections, including Awtar li-awridat al-ghubar and Qunut (Obedience). He has also served as the secretary general of the Yemeni Writers' League.

al-Faqih's work has been translated into English and one of his short stories "The Veiled One" was included in a recent anthology of short stories from the Persian Gulf. He has also been translated into Italian.
