= Subašić =

Subašić (pronounced [sûbaʃitɕ]) is a Bosnian, Serbian, and Croatian surname. Notable people with the surname include:

- Branimir Subašić (born 1982), Serbian born footballer
- Danijel Subašić (born 1984), Croatian football goalkeeper
- Muhamed Subašić (born 1988), Bosnian footballer
- Zijad Subašić (died 1992), Bosnian resistance leader

== See also ==
- Šubašić (pronounced [ʃûbaʃitɕ])
