= Al-Khasawneh =

Jordanian family

Al-Khasawneh or Khasawneh (Arabic: الخصاونه) (other transliterations include Khassawneh, Khasoneh, Khassaweneh, Khasawinah, Khassawnih, Khasawnih, Khasawineh, Khassawineh, Khassawneh, Khasawne, Khasawna, and Khasawnah all of which may also be preceded by 'Al' or 'El'), is a prominent Arab clan descending from the noble family of Imam Ja'far al-Sadiq and Imam Husayn ibn Ali. The Al-Khasawneh tribe is prominent in the Bani Obeid District (بني عبيد) in the Irbid governorate in Jordan specially An Nuaiyymah, Aydoun, and Al Husn.

== Al-Khasawneh in Northern Jordan ==
At the time of the Ottoman Empire, Northern Jordan was a sanjak (administrative division) of the town of Ajloun. The Al-Khasawneh appeared in the second part of the 16th century in Ein Al-Sharah in the mountainous part of Ajloun where they were engaged in constant clashes with bedouin tribes and other local forces before becoming a dominant group in the area known as Al-Asar district (nahiyah, Ajloun). An Ottoman document of 1757 records that their sheikh Musa Al-Hamad was the sheikh of the Banu Obaid group and responsible for contributing to the protection of the annual pilgrimage caravan or hajj to Mecca– a highly lucrative and sought after office. Later on, this part of Al-Asar district was renamed the Banu Obaid district in a classic case of a newcomer group giving their own name to a geographic area. It continues to be known by that name and the Al-Khasawneh are the traditional hereditary sheikhs of the district, although the Nuseirat clan have competed with them at times for the sheikhdom of the district.

In the second part of the 18th century, well-known rebel Daher al-Umar, of Galilee and later Acre extended his rule to the Ajloun area through his son Ahmad al-Daher. The Ottomans, preoccupied with their war against Russia that ended with the Kunuk Kenarcha treaty of 1775, had no choice but to acquiesce to Daher's territorial expansion. In conjunction with his bedouin allies, Musa Al-Hamad led a number of battles against Daher and his son, but was later appointed a member of a consultative group of sheikhs by Ahmad, son of Daher, who nevertheless remained suspicious of his intentions. When Ahmad was informed in the early 1770s that Musa was trying to raise a revolt against him, he invited Musa to his citadel at Tubna in the Koura district of Ajloun, where he was killed after dinner. After 1775 the Ottomans, now free to tackle Daher, sent both Hussein Pasha and Ahmad beik, later Pasha, El-Jazzar against Daher, who was killed, signalling the beginning of a revolt in Ajloun where the Al-Khasawneh and their allies attacked the citadel of Tubna. In the event, Ahmad, son of Daher, escaped to Palestine and threw himself on the mercy of Ottoman officials who took him to Istanbul.

Records from 1757 document the leadership of Sheikh Musa Al-Khasawneh as they navigated the political landscape, forging alliances, showcasing military acumen, and engaging in diplomacy with the Ottoman authorities. Through a narrative woven with strategic maneuvers, Fayuiz Khasawneh's rise to kingship.

For Al-Khasawneh, who had stood firmly by the Ottomans, this proved an auspicious turn of events and soon Musa's two sons, Saleh and Musa II were able to regain their father's possessions and to move to the village of Husn where they and their descendants continued as the leading family in the area.

Musa II also fought against Napoleon's army at the battle of Mount Tabor in northern Palestine, where the French were led by general Kléber and later by Napoleon himself.

In 1869, the Khasawneh were asked by the Ottoman government to move out of Husn. Taking advantage of the situation, they gained possession of the villages of Idoun and Nu'eima along with six or seven ruined villages. These they were able to defend against marauding nomadic tribes and other forces and continue as one of the largest land owners in northern Jordan.

The Ottomans introduced a system of elected local government in the 1860s in what was known as the council of Ajloun, with representation from the old prominent clans of Ajloun with the Al-Khasawneh always having an elected member. This was part of a larger process taking place all over the Middle East whereby the Ottoman co-opted local forces into local and central government.

== Sub-branches ==
The different branches of the clan are: Alhmood, Al-Nawasir, Al-Musa, Al Essa, Al Nasser, Al Barakat, Al Hindawi, Al Musleh, Al Halalsheh, Al-Yousuf.

=== Notable people ===
- Awn Shawkat Al-Khasawneh (Prime Minister of Jordan, Oct 2011 - April 2012 - judge, International Court of Justice)
- Bisher Al-Khasawneh (Prime Minister of Jordan, Oct 2020–2024)
- General Dr. Ibrahim Mansour Al-Khasawneh (Major General in the Jordanian Armed Forces Ret. (Assistant Director of the Jordanian Royal Medical Services for Logistics Affairs)
- Sheikh Abdul Karim Khasawneh (Grand Mufti of the Hashemite Kingdom of Jordan)
- Mahmoud Daifallah Hmoud Al-Khasawneh (Judge, International Court of Justice - Chair of the Seventy-Second Session (2021) of the International Law Commission)
- Ziyad Al Khasawneh (Attorney - Head of Saddam Hussein's Defense Team)
- Dr. Ahmad Mansour Al-Khasawneh (President of [Irbid National University], Jan 2020–Present)
- Dr. Mustafa Fuad Al Khasawneh (Member of Parliament 2016–Present).
- Eng. Anmar Fuad Al Khasawneh (Minister of Transportation 2019).
- Eng. Mazin Fuad Al Khasawneh (Minister of Agriculture 2010).
- Eng. Mohammad Fuad Al Khasawneh (Member of Parliament 2012–2014).
