= Ziad Makhzoumi =

Lebanese businessman

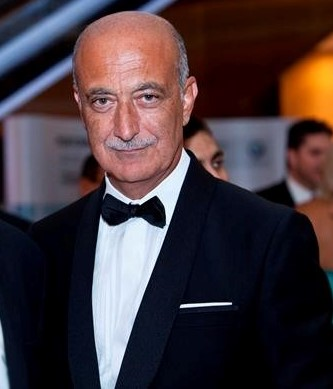
- Born: 20 January 1955 (age 71)
- Education: University of Manchester Manchester Business School
- Occupation: CEO of Fakih IVF

Ziad Makhzoumi (born in Beirut, Lebanon on January 20, 1955) is a Lebanese businessman, former chief executive officer of Fakih IVF and the chief executive officer of Prime Strategy Consulting Group.

== Education and career ==
He holds a BSc in Electronic Engineering and an MBA in Banking and Finance.

In 1981 started his career with Booz Allen & Hamilton the global management consultants.

From 1985 until 2000, Ziad became the CFO and CIO of a Luxembourg based private holding company with operations in North America, Europe, and the MENA region.

From 2001 until his appointment as the CFO of Arabtec Holding PJSC in 2008, Ziad led many strategic restructuring projects in Europe, the Middle East and North America.

In 2013 to become the CEO of Fakih IVF a UAE based specialist fertility medical group and the leader in the GCC in male and female infertility.

== Awards ==
- In 2009, The Revolutionary CFO of the Year.
- In 2010 and 2011, Excellence in Finance.
- In 2010, Wall Street Journal listed him among the top 20 influential non-royal decision makers in the UAE.
- In 2012, Most Admired CFO in the Middle East.
- In 2012, Arabian Business listed him among the top 500 most influential Arabs in the world and recently among the top 50 influential Brits in the UAE.
- In 2014, Healthcare CEO of the Year by Middle East magazine.
