= Zijad Subašić =

Zijad Subašić (died 1992) was a Bosnian Muslim paramilitary leader in Višegrad during the early stage of the Bosnian War (1992–95). He was a founding member of the Patriotic League in Višegrad. After being wounded in a street battle with Serb militias in 1992, he was taken to the hospital in Foča which was still under the Muslim control. After Foča was occupied by the Yugoslav People's Army (JNA), he was taken out of the hospital, brought back to Višegrad and murdered on the Mehmed Paša Sokolović Bridge, a historical location which was used by the Bosnian Serb Army to murder Bosniak civilians during the war. Today, Zijad Subašić is considered a hero among many former citizens of Višegrad. His body was exhumed from a mass grave and identified.

== See also ==
- Višegrad massacre
