= Shmuel Fershko =

Polish composer and musician

Shmuel Fershko (Stanisław Ferszko, Samuel Fersko, also Fereszko; 1914–1990) was a Polish composer and musician.

Born in Łuck, he was a child prodigy on the piano in Warsaw and then went to Warsaw Conservatory. At the age of 23 he composed the operetta Polowanie na lamparta (The Leopard Hunt) first performed in Warsaw in the theatre 8.30, later in Vienna under the name Salzburg Ausverkauft. He worked at the Heyman-Front Jazz dance band (orchestra led by Zygmunt Heyman and Julian Front) and as a piano soloist in the Paradis, Krzywa latarnia (Crooked Lantern) and F.F. nightclubs.

He composed for and accompanied the stage diseuses of the late 1930s: Wiera Gran, Nadieżda Bielicz and Waria Łaska. Some of his greatest hits were Bo to się zwykle tak zaczyna (That's How It Usually Begins), Gdy odejdziesz (When You're Gone) and Maleńka (My Tiny Gal).

In 1937 he moved to Palestine and played in the Tel Aviv Matate theater, as well as Li-La-Lo and Ohel. Known as "The Israeli Gershwin," he was very popular in then-Palestine and later Israel. Many think his songs Beb el Wad, Jeep and Moti are folksongs.

In 1952 he was hired by NBC to go to America where he composed tunes, musicals, operettas and directed the NY Symphony Orchestra. He died 1990 in Florida.
