= Jaden =

Jaden is a unisex given name with roots in Hebrew, meaning "God has heard." It is also found as a surname.

Notable people with the name "Jaden" include:

== Given name ==
=== Male ===
- Jaden Akins (born 2003), American professional basketball player
- Jaden Bradley (born 2003), American professional basketball player
- Jaden Bradley (born 2003), American professional football player
- Jaden Brown (born 1999), English professional footballer
- Jaden Casella (born 2000), Australian professional footballer
- Jaden Charles (born 2002), English professional footballer; son of coach and former player Gary Charles
- Jaden Craig, American college football player
- Jaden Crumedy (born 2000), American NFL player
- Jaden Davis (born 2001), American NFL player
- Jaden de Guzmán (born 2007), Dutch professional footballer
- Jaden Dixon (born 2007), English professional footballer
- Jaden Dogireiy (born 1977), Nauruan politician
- Jaden Dugger (born 2004), American NFL player
- Jaden Eikermann (born 2005), German Olympic diver
- Jaden Fauske (born 2006), American MLB player
- Jaden Greathouse (born 2004), American college football player
- Jaden Hamm (born 2002), American MLB pitcher
- Jaden Hardy (born 2002), American NBA player
- Jaden Hatwell (born 1977), New Zealand cricketer
- Jaden Hendrikse (born 2000), South African professional rugby union player
- Jaden Henley (born 2004), American college basketball player
- Jaden Heskey (born 2005), English professional footballer
- Jaden Hicks (born 2002), American NFL player
- Jaden Hill (born 1999), American MLB pitcher
- Jaden Hossler (born 2001), American singer-songwriter and TikTok personality
- Jaden Ivey (born 2002), American NBA player
- Jaden Keller (born 2003), American football player
- Jaden Ladega (born 2005), English actor
- Jaden Lucas Miller (born 2005), American actor
- Jaden Mangham (born 2003), American college football player
- Jaden McDaniels (born 2000), American NBA player
- Jaden McGrath (born 1996), Australian former AFL player
- Jaden McNeil (born 1999), American activist and online streamer
- Jaden Mears (born 2006), English professional footballer
- Jaden Michael (born 2003), American actor and model
- Jaden Montnor (born 2002), Dutch professional footballer
- Jaden Nixon, American NFL player
- Jaden Philogene (born 2002), English professional footballer
- Jaden Rashada (born 2003), American college football player
- Jaden Robinson (born 2000), American NFL player
- Jaden Schwartz (born 1992), Canadian NHL player
- Jaden Servania (born 2001), Puerto Rican professional footballer
- Jaden Shackelford (born 2001), American professional basketball player
- Jaden Shaw (born 2007), Jamaican chess player
- Jaden Shirden (born 2002), American UFL player
- Jaden Slory (born 2005), Dutch footballer
- Jaden Springer (born 2002), American NBA player
- Jaden Smith (born 1998), American rapper, singer, songwriter, actor, and dancer
- Jaden Umeh (born 2008), Nigerian-Irish professional footballer
- Jaden Voisin (born 2001), American former college football player
- Jaden Walley (born 2001), American college football player
- Jaden Warner (born 2002), English professional footballer
- Jaden Williams (born 2004), English professional footballer
- Jaden Woods (born 2002), American MLB pitcher

=== Female ===
- Jaden Bogden (born 2002), Canadian PWHL player
- Jaden Hair, Hong Kong-American television chef, cookbook author, food columnist, photographer, and food blogger
- Jaden Michaels, American past writer for Sea Gayle Music

== Surname ==
- Aggrey Jaden (1920s–1985/1987), South Sudanese politician
- Bradley Jaden (born 1988), English actor

== Fictional characters ==
- Jaden, in the UK anthology TV series Black Mirror, Smithereens, played by Damson Idris
- Jaden Korr, in the 2003 first- and third-person shooter video game Star Wars Jedi Knight: Jedi Academy, voiced by Phillip Tanzini and Jennifer Hale
- Jaden Yuki, in the Japanese anime TV series Yu-Gi-Oh! GX, voiced by Kenn (Japanese) and Matthew Charles (English)

== See also ==
- Jade (given name)
- Jadon
- Jayden
