= Jayda =

Jayda /ˈdʒeɪdə/ is a feminine given name, a derivative of Jade via Jada or a feminine form of Jayden. Notable people named Jayda include:

- Jayda Avanzado, a Filipina singer-songwriter and actress.
- Jayda Coleman, American softball player
- Jayda Fransen, British political activist.
- Jayda Hylton-Pelaia, Canadian-Jamaican footballer.
