= New Classic =

New Classic may refer to:

- The New Classic, 2014 album of Iggy Azalea
  - The New Classic Tour, debut tour by Iggy Azalea coinciding with release of album The New Classic
- "New Classic", a track on the soundtrack album of Another Cinderella Story
- New Classic, 2023 album of Dolla
- New Classic ~ The Embodiment of Scarlet Devil, 2026 remake of the 2002 bullet hell game Embodiment of Scarlet Devil, the sixth entry in the Touhou Project series
