= Zayden =

Given name

Zayden (/ˈzeɪdən/) is a masculine given name of modern American origin and is a variant of the male given name Aidan (name). The popularity of Zayden as a baby name in the United States peaked in 2014 when it reached 188th. The name entered into usage over the late 1990s and early 2000s decade. Despite similar spellings it is not etymologically related to the male given name Jayden, derived from the Biblical name Jadon the Meronothite, which means "he will judge".

Arabic meaning

Zayden (زيدان) can also be an Arabic name that means "growth" or "increase". It can be written in various ways such as Zaydan and Zidan and is similar to the name Zayd, which shares the similar meaning of “abundance” or “plentiful”.
