= Jade (given name) =

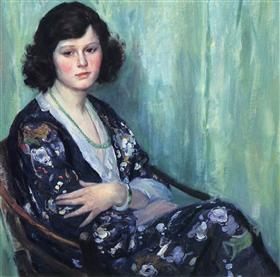
- Jade Beads by Guy Rose, between 1907 and 1912. The name Jade is taken from the ornamental stone called jade.
- Pronunciation: /ˈdʒeɪd/ JAYD, French ZHAD
- Gender: Unisex

Origin
- Origin: Spanish
- Meaning: jade, precious green stone

Other names
- Related names: Giada, Jada, Jaden

Jade is a given name derived from the ornamental stone jade, which is used in artwork and in jewellery-making. The name is derived from the Spanish piedra de la ijada, which means "stone of the bowels". There was a belief that when jade was placed on the stomach, it could cure colic in babies. The stone is greatly valued in Asian countries. Confucius believed it had properties encouraging purity, bravery, and honesty. Chinese emperors were buried in suits made of the stone because they believed it would make them live on forever.

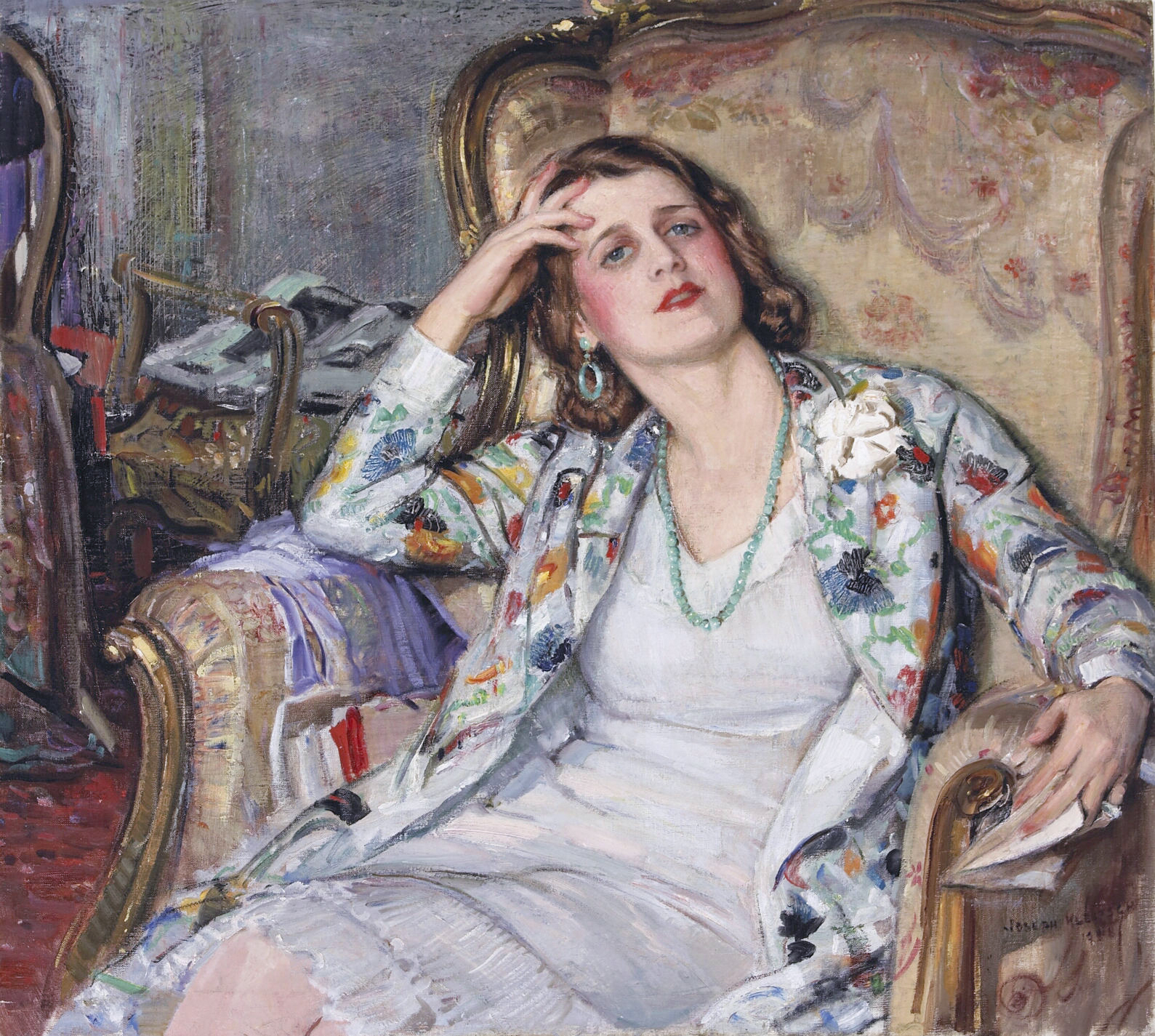
The Jade Necklace by Joseph Kleitsch, 1928

The name was the most popular name given to newborn girls in France in 2022. It was among the five most popular names for newborn girls in Monaco in 2023. The name has been used for both boys and girls in the United States and currently ranks among the top 1,000 names for American girls. It ranked among the 1,000 most common names for boys born in the United States throughout the mid-1990s. In the mid-1990s, Jade was among the top 25 most popular names for girls in England and Wales. It was also among the most common names for girls in Scotland, Ireland, Belgium, Canada, Australia, and Northern Ireland in recent years. Jada, a variant of the name, was also a popular name for girls born in the United States and Canada in recent years. Jayda, a spelling variant, was also a popular name in recent years in the United States. Spelling variant Jaida is also in use for American girls. Giada, an Italian variant of the name, was also well used in the United States. Jaden, also a popular name for boys and girls in the United States with multiple spelling variants, is also sometimes seen as a variant of Jade.

== People with the given name ==
=== Women ===
- Jade Alleyne (born 2001), Scottish actress
- Jade Anderson (born 1980), British singer
- Jade Atkin (born 2001), British wheelchair basketball player
- Jade Barbosa (born 1991), Brazilian gymnast
- Jade Bird (born 1997), English singer-songwriter
- Jade Bowler (born 2000), British YouTuber known as Unjaded Jade
- Jade Brooks, Canadian author
- Jade Carey (born 2000), American gymnast
- Jade Cole (born 1979), American model
- Jade Downie-Landry (born 1995), Canadian ice hockey player
- Jade Holland Cooper (born 1986/87), British fashion designer
- Jade Edmistone (born 1982), Australian swimmer
- Jade Ewen (born 1988), British singer and actress
- Jade Goody (1981–2009), British reality star
- Jade Hovine (born 2004), Belgian figure skater
- Jade Howard (born 1995), Zambian swimmer
- Jade Jagger (born 1971), daughter of Mick Jagger
- Jade Johnson (born 1980), English long jumper
- Jade Jones (athlete) (born 1996), English wheelchair racer
- Jade Jones (taekwondo) (born 1993), Welsh taekwondo athlete
- Jade Kake, New Zealand Māori architect and architectural designer
- Jade Kwan (born 1979), Hong Kong Cantopop singer
- Jade LeMac, Canadian singer and songwriter
- Jade MacRae (born 1979), Australian singer
- Jade Nassi (born 2003), Moroccan footballer
- Jade Raymond (born 1975), Canadian video game producer and executive
- Jade Seah (born 1983), Singaporean actress and model
- Jade Thirlwall (born 1992), British singer known mononymously as Jade
- Jade Thomas (born 1982), Welsh footballer
- Jade Villalon (born 1980), American singer and member of German music project Sweetbox
- Jade Windley (born 1990), British tennis player
- Jade Snow Wong (1922–2006), Chinese-American ceramic artist and writer

=== Men ===
- Jade C. Bell, Canadian quadriplegic actor
- Jade Buford (born 1988), American racing driver
- Jade Dernbach (born 1986), South African-born England cricketer
- Jade Esteban Estrada (born 1975), American actor
- Jade Gatt (born 1978), Australian actor
- Jade Gresham (born 1997), Australian footballer
- Jade Kindar-Martin (born 1974), American circus performer
- Jade Jones (singer) (born 1979), British singer and chef
- Jade North (born 1982), Australian football player
- Jade Puget (born 1973), American musician and producer
- Jade Rawlings (born 1977), Australian footballer
- Jade Yorker (born 1985), American actor
- Lucas Jade Zumann (born 2000), American actor

== Fictional characters ==
- Cheshire (character), DC Comics supervillainess Jade Nguyen
- Jade, a character in the 2009 American comedy film The Hangover
- Jade (DC Comics), a DC Comics superheroine
- Jade (Beyond Good & Evil), main protagonist of the video game Beyond Good & Evil
- Jade (Mortal Kombat), in the Mortal Kombat video game series
- Jade/The Indigo Child, in the Fahrenheit (a.k.a. Indigo Prophecy) video game
- Jade (El Clon), in the Telemundo television series El Clon
- Jade Chan, Jackie's niece in the animated TV series Jackie Chan Adventures
- Jade Mitchell, in the Australian soap opera Neighbours
- Jade Sutherland, in the Australian soap opera Home and Away
- Jade Albright, in the British soap opera Hollyoaks
- Jade West, a main character in the American TV sitcom series Victorious
- Jade, a character in the Shadow Raiders TV series
- Jade (Kinnikuman), in the manga and anime series Ultimate Muscle
- Jade, in the manga series Land of the Lustrous and the TV series based on it
- Jade Barrett (a.k.a Jewels), blacklist racer #8 in Need For Speed Most Wanted (2005)
- Jade Curtiss, in Tales of the Abyss
- Jade, from The Prophecy of the Stones novel
- Jade Fontaine, a character of the PvP webcomic
- Jade Harley, from the Homestuck webcomic
- Jade Herrera, in the American science fiction horror TV series From
- Jade Wilson, from the Teen Titans Go! To the Movies film
- Jade Vernon, from the Traces series of books
- Jade, a playable character in the video game Honkai: Star Rail
- Jade, a kept man in the King Crimson song Cadence and Cascade
- Jade, a character from the 2017 video game Dragon Quest XI
- Jade, the namesake and mascot character of a YouTube music channel (Lofi Girl § Mascot)
- Jade, a character in the Bratz toyline
- Mara Jade, in the Star Wars franchise
- Jade "Skorpion" Aldemir, major character from Dying Light video game
- Jade Leech, a character in the Disney Twisted-Wonderland mobile game
