= Heal (Southeast Asian artists song) =

"HEAL"

Song by Southeast Asian artists
- Released: September 11, 2020
- Genre: Pop
- Length: 4:45 (song); 5:10 (music video); 5:16 (lyric video)
- Label: Star Music
- Songwriters: Jonathan Manalo; Moophs; Alex Godinez
- Producer: Jonathan Manalo

Music video
- "HEAL" on YouTube

"Heal" (stylized in all caps) is a song produced by Jonathan Manalo and released on September 11, 2020 by Star Music. The song was produced as a collaboration song featuring all-female Southeast Asian singers, to extend the love and spur unity for everyone's healing during these hard times as well as in response to the COVID-19 pandemic situation.

== Overview ==
"HEAL" was produced as part of the eponymous project that is the first in Southeast Asia. It's also part of the #StreamToDonate project, where participating artists donate their share of fees and royalties to “Pantawid ng Pag-ibig” (A Bridge to Love), a fund-raising campaign by ABS-CBN which aims to provide relief to Filipinos who have lost their sources of income and livelihood due to the COVID-19 pandemic.

== Production ==
"HEAL" was composed by ABS-CBN music creative director, Jonathan Manalo, Tarsier Records founder Moophs and Alex Godinez, also known as Xela, with Manalo serves as its overall producer. The song was performed by 14 Southeast Asian all-female singers, consisting of Filipino singers: Kyla, KZ Tandingan, Jayda, Moira Dela Torre, Jona and Lesha; Indonesian singers: Rini Wulandari and Yura Yunita; Malaysian singers: DOLLA and Shalma Eliana; Singaporean singers: Haneri and Haven and Thai singer, Valentina Ploy. According to project head, Naomi Enriquez: "The all-female lineup was really intended for the music because that's how the demo sounded, that's how the vision of our creative director was". The project was finalized during the COVID-19 situation.

== Themes ==
Elyse Ilagan, writing for One Mega, wrote that the song "delivers a message of hope and healing" while "choosing love to overcome hate and negativity in the world".

== Credits and personnel ==
Credits and personnel adapted from liner notes.

Song

- Jonathan Manalo, Moophs, Alex Godinez - songwriters
- Theo Martel, Jonathan Manalo - arrangements
- Jonathan Manalo - arrangements, producer
- Tim Recla (The Purple Room) - mixer
- Jett Galindo (The Bakery USA) - mastering

Project team

- Roxy Liquigan - overall executive-in-charge
- Jeff Victoria - advertising and promotions head
- Naomi Enriquez - project head

Music video

- Naomi Enriquez, Jeff Victoria, William Garcia - concept
- Jaliza Baluyut - editing, animation
- Christine Cheng - graphics
- Jean Gonzales, Tristan Lunar - VTR
- Christian Cajocson - promo specialist
