= Jonathan Manalo =

Filipino composer and music producer

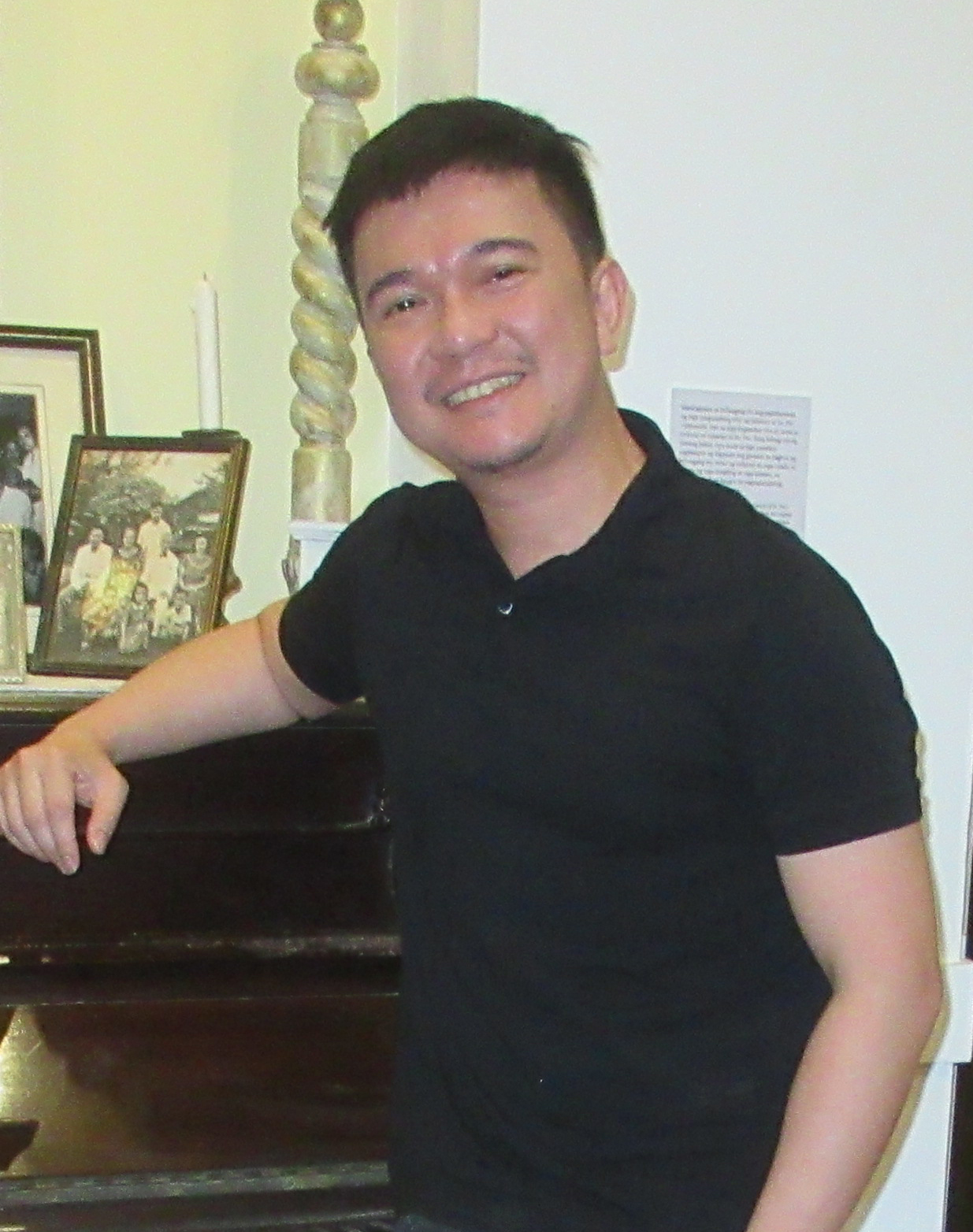
- Manalo in 2023

Background information
- Born: Jonathan Suarez Manalo; November 26, 1978 (age 47); Manila, Philippines
- Occupations: Songwriter; record producer
- Years active: c. 1990s–present
- Labels: Star Music; Starpop

Jonathan Suarez Manalo (born November 26, 1978) is a Filipino songwriter and record producer. He is currently the creative director of ABS-CBN Music, having composed numerous compositions for ABS-CBN programs. His compositions for various artists have earned him 75 multi-platinum and 100 gold certifications

== Early life ==
Manalo grew up in Valenzuela, Metro Manila. He began composing and learning music as a child because of his family's passion for music. At age 13, he finished his first full composition entitled Aming Panginoon (Our Lord). This song was chosen as one of the ten finalists in a songfest and was included in the compilation album Ikapitong Salmo (The Seventh Psalm).

== Career ==
=== Gospel music career ===
Manalo was part of the gospel music group called Papuri! Music Ministry in the early 1990s. Some of his notable contributions to the Papuri! discography include "Tunay Nga" in Papuri! Volume 17, and "Kaya Mo" in Papuri! Volume 18. His siblings have been involved with his career, often vocalizing his compositions. He also improved his producing skills at the Far East Broadcasting Company, a local Christian radio station. He was also mentored by Jungee Marcelo, a gospel songwriter who competed in songwriting festivals.

=== Mainstream breakthrough ===
Manalo made his first significant break in the Philippine music industry with ABS-CBN's Himig Handog sa Makabagong Kabataan contest, which was open to amateurs and professionals alike. He won the grand prize with the winning composition, "Tara Tena", a song that centered around inspiring the youth to do more for their country, and was interpreted by Kyla, Kaya, and V3. Dubbed then as the "anthem of the youth" by the Filipino politician Loren Legarda, it was used as a theme song for an eponymous TV series that catered to a younger audience.

In 2003, he entered and won third prize at the 7th Metropop Song Festival with "Buti Na Lang".

=== Work with ABS-CBN Music ===
In 2004, he was offered a permanent position as a record producer and songwriter at ABS-CBN Music. His work with the network began with producing music for ABS-CBN shows including Wansapanataym, Search For The Star In A Million, Star Circle Quest, Pinoy Big Brother, Sharon’s May Kasama Ka, Maria Flor De Luna, and Mga Anghel Na Walang Langit.

In 2007, Manalo was promoted to audio content and A&R head at Star Music. He remained in this position until 2019, when he was promoted to creative director.

In 2016, Manalo celebrated his 15th anniversary of composing with a concert titled KINSE: The Music of Jonathan Manalo. It was held on December 3 at the Music Museum.

In 2020, Manalo collaborated with other Southeast Asian musical artists to create the song "HEAL". The song was inspired by the COVID-19 pandemic and raised money to help those impacted by it.

=== 'Kwento ng Alon' and 'Lyric and Beat' ===
In 2022, Manalo celebrated his 20th anniversary as a mainstream composer. In relation to this milestone, Manalo collaborated with visual artist Kristine Lim on an art exhibit called Kwento ng Alon. This exhibit featured artworks by Lim based on Manalo's discography, including "Tara Tena", the Pinoy Big Brother theme song "Pinoy Ako", and the theme of FPJ's Ang Probinsyano.

Another tribute to Manalo's 20-year career was Lyric and Beat, a musical drama released on iWantTFC. It featured actors Andrea Brillantes and Seth Fedelin. The series also featured Manalo's songs.

As part of this anniversary, a concert titled Mr. Music: The Hits of Jonathan Manalo was held at the Newport Performing Arts Theater in Resorts World Manila. Over 30 artists performed in the event, including P-pop groups BINI, BGYO and VXON, Lyric and Beat stars Jeremy Glinoga, AC Bonifacio, Darren Espanto, Angela Ken and Sheena Belarmino, My Safe Place EP artists Trisha Denise, LU.ME, KIRI, kotoji, and Marian Carmel, Idol Philippines Season 1 winner Zephanie and OPM icons KZ Tandingan, Moira Dela Torre, Erik Santos, Kyla, Angeline Quinto and many more.

In 2025, Manalo became a Grammy voting member.

== Personal life ==
Manalo is a Christian, and his faith influences his music views. While Manalo usually creates music "for the thrill of it", he maintains a dedication to creating songs that are "not against the laws of God". In general, he composes primarily inspirational songs. According to him, a song is good if "it connects to a multitude of people." Manalo also considers composing music as a way to relieve stress.

=== "Pinoy Ako" controversy ===
Allegations were made that "Pinoy Ako", the popular theme song of the Pinoy Big Brother franchise that Manalo composed and Orange and Lemons sang, had been copied from the 1980s Care hit "Chandeliers". Clem Castro, who produced the song with the Orange and Lemons, said that the allegations were false, and that the music was original.

=== Awards and recognitions ===
In 2018, Manalo broke his own record at the Awit Awards with 21 nominations for both his songwriting and record producing.

In 2021, he was chosen to be one of the recipients of the inaugural SUDI National Music Award from the National Commission for Culture and the Arts, along with other musical artists including Gloc-9, Ebe Dancel, Noel Cabangon, and the Rak of Aegis cast.

In the same year, Manalo also won the Best Theme Song award at the Asian Academy Creative Awards for the song "He's Into Her" sung by the group BGYO.

== Discography ==
=== Compilation albums ===
- 2008 – Love Life (Life Songs and Life Stories)
- 2017 – JM 15 (Jonathan Manalo Hits)
- 2022 –The Music of Jonathan Manalo 20 Years

=== Soundtrack albums ===
- Click, Like, Share (Original Soundtrack) EP (2021)
- Marry Me, Marry You (Original Soundtrack) EP (2021)
- Viral Scandal (Original Soundtrack) (2021)
- Love Is Color Blind (Original Soundtrack) (2021)
- The Themes of the Broken Marriage Vow (2022)
- Bola Bola (Original Soundtrack) (2022)
- He's into Her Season 2 (Original Soundtrack) (2022)
- Love In 40 Days (Official Soundtrack) EP (2022)
- Lyric and Beat, Vol. 1 (2022)
- Lyric and Beat, Vol. 2 (2022)
- Lyric and Beat, Vol. 3 (2022)
- Lyric and Beat, Vol. 4 (2022)
- Run to Me (Official Soundtrack) EP (2022)
- What's Wrong With Secretary Kim (Original Soundtrack) (2024)
- It's Okay Not to Be Okay (2025)

=== Singles ===
Title	Year	Album	Ref.
"Pinakamahal Kong Bayan"	2020	Non-album single	
"Pinoy Tayo" (with Rico Blanco)	2021	Non-album single	
"Leni Laban!" (with various artists)	2022	Non-album single	
"Sa Isang Pangarap" (with Andrea Brillantes)	2022	Lyric and Beat, Vol. 1	
"Hindi Kita Iiwan" (with Seth Fedelin)	2022	Lyric and Beat, Vol. 1	
"Pagbigyang Muli" (with Darren Espanto)	2022	Lyric and Beat, Vol. 2	
"Must be Going Crazy" (with Jeremy G)	2022	Lyric and Beat, Vol. 2	
"Free Fall Into Love" (with AC Bonifacio)	2022	Lyric and Beat, Vol. 2	
"May Kasama Ka" (with Nyoy Valante)	2022	Lyric and Beat, Vol. 3	
"It's Okay Not to Be Okay" (with Kyle Ecchari)	2022	Lyric and Beat, Vol. 3	
"My Destiny" (with Sheena Bellarmino)	2022	Lyric and Beat, Vol. 4	
"May Pag-asa Ba?" (with Angela Ken & Jeremy G)	2022	Lyric and Beat, Vol. 4	
"Let it Loose" (with Kyle Ecchari)	2022	Lyric and Beat, Vol. 4	
"Nais" (with Ben&Ben)	2024	Non-album single	
"Hesus Aming Hari" (with various artists)	2024	Non-album single	
