= Jadin =

The French surname Jadin derives from the give name Gérard. It is common especially in Lorraine and Picardie. Notable people with the name include:

- Hyacinthe Jadin, French composer and pianist
- Louis-Emmanuel Jadin, French composer, violinist, harpsichordist, pianist, and teacher
- Louis Godefroy Jadin, French painter
- Paul Jadin, mayor of Green Bay, Wisconsin

== See also ==
- Jayden (disambiguation), includes people with the given name Jadin
- Yadin (disambiguation)
