= Senior (film) =

Senior (Matanda)
- Film poster
- รุ่นพี่
- Directed by: Wisit Sasanatieng
- Written by: Wisit Sasanatieng
- Produced by: Wisit Sasanatieng; Athimes Arunrojangkul
- Starring: Jannine Weigel; Phongsakon Tosuwan; Sa-ad Piampongsan
- Cinematography: Chuckiat Narongrit
- Edited by: Phannipha Kabillikavanich; Sunit Asavinikul
- Music by: Wild at Heart Co., LTD.
- Distributed by: M39
- Release date: 13 January 2015
- Running time: 113 minutes
- Country: Thailand
- Language: Thai

Senior (Thai: รุ่นพี่) is a 2015 Thai horror film directed by Wisit Sasanatieng. It stars Jannine Weigel, Phongsakon Tosuwan and Sa-ad Piampongsan in the main roles. It is available on Viu Indonesia with Indonesian subtitles.

== Plot ==
A pair of detective buddies from two different dimensions team up to solve a murder that took place half a century ago. One of them is Adhiti, a grade-12 high school student of a convent boarding school. The other is a spirit of a senior student of the school. Adhiti and the Senior take up the investigation in order to find the real murderer. They dig up evidence and locate witnesses, and along the way, they encounter men, women, as well as vengeful spirits that try to stop them from finding out the truth. At the same time, Adhiti has to find out the true identity of her buddy: who's the Senior?

== Cast ==
- Jannine Weigel as Mademoiselle Adhiti(Mon)
- Phongsakon Tosuwan as Senior
- Nutticha Namwong as Ant
- Raweeroj Lertphiphopmetha as Dr.No
- Kara Polasit as Her Serene Highness Princess Barnnavadi Rasmi
- Pornphan Kasemmatsu as Ma Mere Hannah
- Sa-ad Piampongsan as Dr. Sa-noe
- Piathip Kumwong as Wipa
- Sutthipha Kongnawdee as Piangfah
- Nabeya Kulanet as Ma Mere Audrey

== See also ==
- List of ghost films
- List of Thai films
