= Dolla: Mini Album =

EP by Dolla
- Released: February 21, 2022
- Genres: Pop; electronic; R&B; ballad
- Length: 22:26
- Languages: Malay; English
- Labels: Lion Music Group; Universal Music Malaysia

Dolla chronology
Dolla: Mini Album (2022)	New Classic (2023)

Singles from Dolla: Mini Album
- 1. "Dolla Make You Wanna" Released: 20 March 2020; 2. "Impikan" Released: 30 October 2020; 3. "Berani" Released: 24 September 2021; 4. "Bad" Released: 11 February 2022

Dolla: Mini Album is the debut EP by Malaysian girl group Dolla. It was released by Lion Music Group and Universal Music Malaysia on 21 February 2022, and contains eight tracks including four singles, "Dolla Make You Wanna", "Impikan", "Berani" and "Bad". The EP is a collection of the groups first pieces of work.

== Background and release ==
The EP was preceded by the release of Dolla's debut single, "Dolla Make You Wanna" on 20 March 2020 during the implementation of the Movement Control Order (MCO) to curb the spread of the COVID-19 pandemic in Malaysia. Its official music video has garnered one million views on YouTube. The second single, "Impikan" was released on 30 October and was also released in an English version with the title "Watch Me Glow". Dolla's third single, " Berani " was released on 24 September 2021, while an acoustic version of the song was released in January 2022. "Bad" was later released as the fourth single on 11 February.

Dolla: Mini Album was released on 21 February 2022. Dolla initially planned to release 500 CD units. However, the number was increased to 1000 units due to the overwhelming response from Dolla fans. The album sold out 1,000 units within 24 hours of its official launch. Universal Music Malaysia's Domestic Promotion Manager, Anne Mukhtar, said the increase was made after many fans missed out on the chance to own it and were eager to buy it. She stated: "Initially, we opened pre-orders for only 500 units for this album and within 12 hours it was sold out. Many fans complained about missing out and facing difficulties when placing orders. We ourselves did not expect it to sell out so quickly. That's why we decided to take the initiative to open pre-orders for an additional 500 units and that too sold out quickly,". In addition, the album also contains a photo book and individual postcards for each member. The song "Raya Raya Raya" released in May 2021 is included as a bonus track.

== Track listing ==
No.	Title	Length
1.	"Bad"	3:39
2.	"Dolla Make You Wanna"	2:46
3.	"Impikan"	3:31
4.	"Berani"	3:17
5.	"Berani" (Acoustic version)	3:30
6.	"Watch Me Glow" (English version of "Impikan")	3:31
7.	"Bad" (English version)	3:39
8.	"Raya Raya Raya" (Bonus track)	3:18
Total length:		22:26

== Awards and nominations ==
Year	Award	Category	Nominated work	Result
2021	34th Bintang Popular Berita Harian Awards (ABPBH)	Popular Collaboration/Duo/Group Artis	"Dolla Make You Wanna"	Nominated
2023	Gempak Most Wanted Awards 2022 (GMWA 2022)	Lagu Trending Tergempak 2022	"Bad"	Won
2023	Gempak Most Wanted Awards 2022 (GMWA 2022)	Video Muzik Tergempak 2022	"Bad"	Won

== Charts ==
Weekly chart performance for "Dolla:Mini Album"
Chart	"Bad"	"Raya Raya Raya"
Malaysia Domestic(RIM)	1	5
Malaysia Songs	10	16

== Certification ==
Country	Certification(s)	Sales/distribution
Malaysia	—	1,000

== Release history ==
Country	Release date	Format	Label(s)
Malaysia	21 February 2022	CD, digital download, streaming	Lion Music Group, Universal Music Group Malaysia
