= Jannine Weigel =

Thai actress, singer and host (born 2000)

- ญานนีน ไวเกล
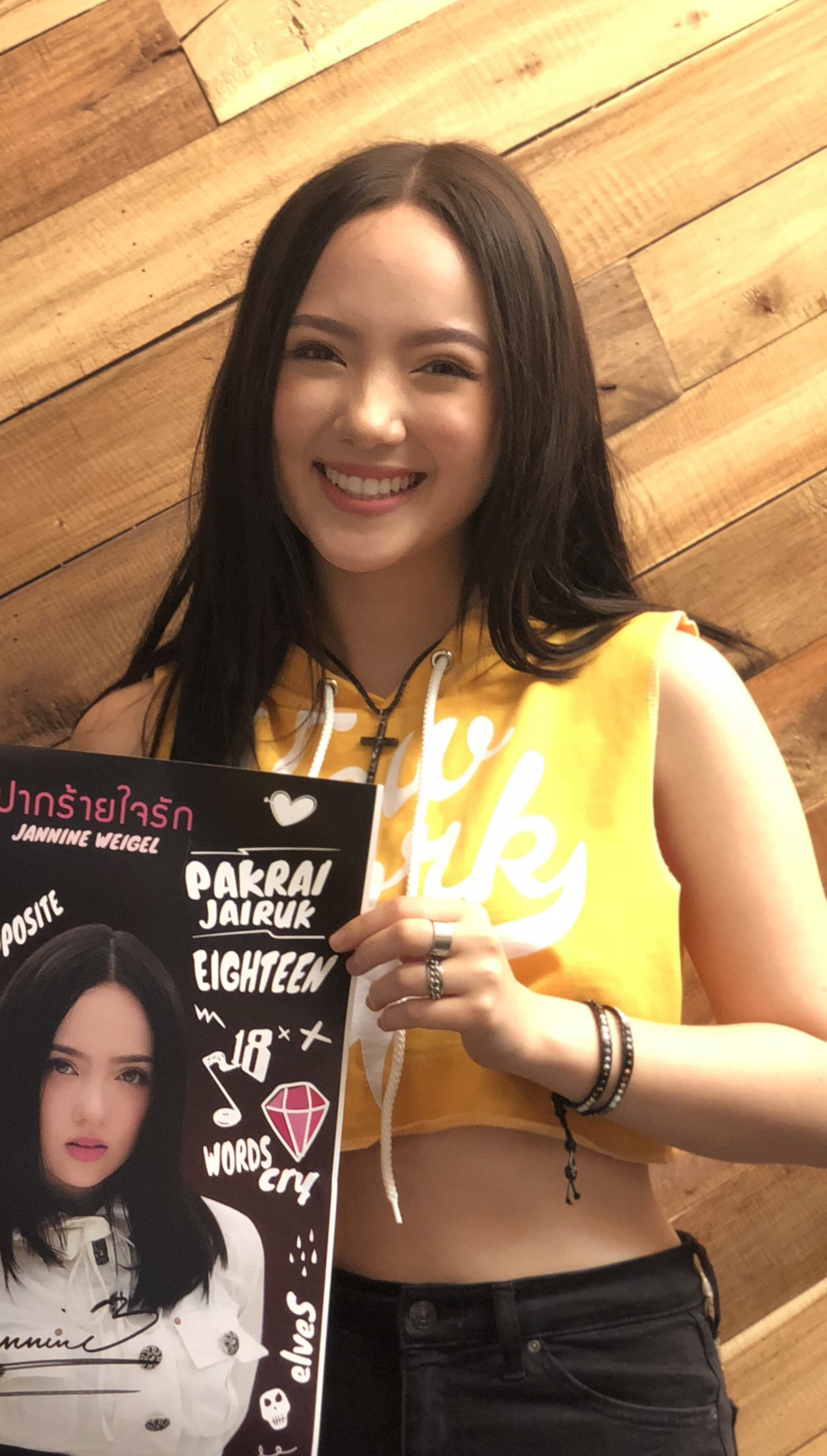
- Weigel in 2018
- Born: Jannine Parawie Weigel; 30 July 2000 (age 26); Steinfurt, Germany
- Other name: Ploychompoo (พลอยชมพู)
- Citizenship: Germany; Thailand
- Education: Sukhothai Thammathirat
- Occupations: Singer; Actress; YouTuber
- Years active: 2010–present
- Height: 1.64 m (5 ft 4 1/2 in)
- Musical career
- Labels: GMM Grammy; Universal; RedRecords

YouTube information
- Channel: Jannine Weigel
- Subscribers: 4.03 million
- Views: 789 million
- Last updated: 4 August 2026
- Website: jannineweigelofficial.com

Jannine Parawie Weigel (Thai: ญานนีน ภารวี ไวเกล; born 30 July 2000), also known by the Thai nickname Ploychompoo (Thai: พลอยชมพู), is a Thai-German singer-songwriter, actress, and model.

== Early life and education ==
Weigel was born on 30 July 2000 in Steinfurt, Germany, to a Thai mother and a German father. Her first name, Jannine (Thai: ญานนีน, IPA: [jaːn.niːn]), was from Hebrew, meaning "Yahweh is gracious". Her middle name, Parawie (Thai: ภารวี, RTGS: Pharawi, IPA: [pʰaː.rá.wiː]), means "sunbeam" in Thai. Her Thai nickname, Ploychompoo (Thai: พลอยชมพู, RTGS: Phloichomphu, IPA: [pʰlɔːj.t͡ɕʰom.pʰuː]), means "pink sapphire".

Weigel has three elder brothers, born 1985, 1988 and 1990, respectively. She lived in Steinfurt until her tenth year of age and moved to Bangkok, Thailand, in July 2010.

Weigel attended St Martin kindergarten and Regenbogen Primary School in Steinfurt, Germany until Grade 4 as she moved to Bangkok. In Thailand, she was given homeschooling until Grade 6. She continued her education through distance learning until Grade 9, which she completed in 2014. By way of Advanced Placement, she now undertakes a pre-degree course at the Faculty of Liberal Arts, Sukhothai Thammathirat Open University, where she majors in English. She took a summer course in Berklee College of Music in 2018 whereas she received a scholarship from the college.

Weigel speaks Thai, English, and German fluently. She is also studying Mandarin Chinese and Vietnamese.

Weigel is a Christian.

== Career ==
Weigel started working as a model after moving to Bangkok in 2010. The next year, she turned her attention to singing. Following three months of training, she entered a national televised singing contest for children, called Singing Kids, and won third place. From there, she became an artist trainee at GMM Grammy in October 2012 before becoming a full artist under it.

In 2012, during her trainee period, she appeared in the music video of Getsunova's "Klai Khae Nai Khue Klai" (ไกลแค่ไหนคือใกล้, "How Much Further Is It Till I Could Be Near You?"), which brought her to fame. In 2013, she started her YouTube channel where she publishes, amongst other things, her covers of popular songs. Many of the covers went viral and gained many million views.

In 2015, Weigel released her first single, "Chak Din Chak Ngo", followed by a number of original soundtrack songs. In the same year, she was given the main roles in the television series Banlang Mek and the film Senior. In 2016, she issued her second single, "Away". She then released a couple more songs with the company GMM Grammy such as "Because Of You" and "I'm Glad".

She was working on English singles as well. Two EPs were released, namely Genesis and Deep End, marking her first step to international stage. She also released her first German single, Zurück Zu Dir and was invited to sing the song on a Germany award show, Webvideopreis Deutschland.

In the same year, she released a new project, The Black Moon consists of 4 horror short movies with her name credited as executive producer. She then ended her contract with GMM Grammy in June 2018.

Soon after, she signed a contract with Universal Music Singapore and released a song called "Pak Rai Jai Rak". The following year, she was starring as main actress in "Pee Nak", a horror-comedy movie which achieved more than 150 million Baht in Thailand Box Office and released a song called "Words" which led her to be nominated as "Best Southeast Asia Act 2019" in MTV Europe Music Awards Seville.

She had joined a lot of music shows abroad in South Korea, Malaysia, Philippines, Indonesia, and others.

On 6 December 2019, she became the first artist to be signed under a new label, RedRecords, based in Kuala Lumpur, a joint venture between AirAsia Group and Universal Music Group. She released her debut single under the label called "Passcode" on 18 September 2020. "Passcode" was recorded and completed in Malaysia. Produced by Tommy Brown (record producer) and was co-written by Jessie Reyez.

On 21 December 2021, Weigel had announced to Thai media to take legal action against her former label, RedRecords for termination of contract, breach of contract, and claim for damages.

== Discography ==
=== Studio albums ===
| Title | Album details |
|---|---|
| อยู่คนเดียวให้ได้' Be Alone | Language: Thai; Released: 6 April 2022; Label: Chiva Record; Formats: CD (Note: "Be Alone" was limited to 350 physical copies sold.); Track listing: 1. อยู่คนเดียวให้ได้ (Be Alone); 2. เจ็บไม่จำ (Jeb Mai Cham); 3. สายไป (Too Late); 4. ปากร้ายใจรัก (Pak Rai Jai Rak); 5. เหงา (Lonely); 6. น้ำตา (Tears); 7. อีกนิดหนึ่ง (A Little More); 8. กระจก (Mirror); BONUS TRACK: 1. ปากร้ายใจรัก (Pak Rai Jai Rak - Acoustic Guitar Version); 2. อยู่คนเดียวให้ได้ (Be Alone - Acoustic Guitar Version) |

=== Cover Albums ===
| Title | Album details |
|---|---|
| Ploychompoo | Language: Thai; Released: 1 January 2015; Label: GMM Grammy PCL; Formats: digital download; Track listing: 1. อยากหยุดเวลา (I want to stop the time) (Yahk Yoot Way Lah); 2. ฝากไว้ (Fak Wi); 3. ฉันหรือเธอ(ที่เปลี่ยนไป) (Is it Me or You that Changed?) (Chun Reu Tur (Tee Plien Party)); 4. ดอกไม้ที่ทำตก (Falen Flowers) (Dauk Mai Tee Tum Dtok); 5. รักไม่ยอมเปลี่ยนแปลง (Ruk Mai Yaum Bplian Bplaeng); 6. คิดถึงนะ (Kit Teung Na); 7. กา กา กา (Gah Gah Gah); 8. ไกลแค่ไหน คือใกล้ (Glai Kae Nai Keu Glai); 9. รู้ (Ru); 10. อยากเป็นคนนั้น (Yahk Pen Kon Nun); 11. หนึ่งคำที่ล้นใจ (Nueng Kam Tee Lone Jai); 12. แหลก (Laek); 13. มองแต่ไม่เห็น ฟังแต่ไม่ได้ยิน (One Word, Two Feelings) (Maung Dtae Mai Hen Fung Dtae Mai Dai Yin); 14. เธอ (Ther) |
| มีสิทธิ์แค่ติดเหล้า' You only have the right to be an alcoholic | Language: Thai; Released: 21 February 2024; Label: independent; Formats: digital download; Track listing: 1. อยู่ดีๆก็... (Line...); 2. เธอไม่ต้องน่ารักทุกวันก็ได้นะ (Mai Tong Narak); 3. เลือดกรุ๊ปบี (B Blood Type); 4. แม่งเอ๊ย (Fxxx It); 5. ชอบชะมุด (I like U); 6. ถ้าเราเจอกันอีก (Until Then); 7. ทน (Ton); 8. ท้องฟ้ากับแสงดาวและสองเรา (No More Empty Nights); 9. บักคนซั่ว (Bug Khon Suea); 10. มองแต่ไม่เห็น ฟังแต่ไม่ได้ยิน (Look but Don't See, Listen but Don't Hear) |

=== EPs ===
| Title | Album details |
|---|---|
| Genesis | Language: English; Released: 17 September 2015; Label: independent; Formats: CD, digital download; Track listing: 1. Raindrops; 2. Still Your Girl; 3. Pluto; 4. Shotgun; 5. Guard Your Heart |
| Deep End | Language: English; Released: 6 July 2017; Label: independent; Formats: CD, digital download; Track listing: 1. Deep End; 2. Heart Stop; 3. Strangled Love |

=== Singles ===
| Year | Title | Peak chart positions | Album |
| Year | Title | IW Chart | Album |
|---|---|---|---|
| 2015 | "Chak Din Chak Ngo" ("Temper Tantrum") ชักดิ้นชักงอ | — | The Meeting Room |
| 2015 | "Pluto" | — | Genesis |
| 2015 | "Still Your Girl" | — | Genesis |
| 2015 | "Shotgun" | — | Genesis |
| 2015 | "Guard Your Heart" | — | Genesis |
| 2015 | "Raindrops" (Note: "Raindrops (Bangkok Remix)" was released on 14 July 2017 and "Raindrops (Silverstrike Remix)" was released on 21 December 2018.) | — | Genesis |
| 2016 | "Away" ปลิว | 3 | —N/a |
| 2016 | "Finish Line" | — | —N/a |
| 2016 | "Because of You" อาจเป็นเพราะ | — | —N/a |
| 2017 | "I'm Glad" ดีใจ | — | —N/a |
| 2017 | "Mirror (Live)" | — | —N/a |
| 2017 | "Zurück Zu Dir" | — | —N/a |
| 2017 | "Deep End" (Note: "Deep End (Farbenblind & NeoTune! Remix)" was released on 6 October 2017.) | — | Deep End |
| 2017 | "Strangled Love" | — | Deep End |
| 2017 | "Heart Stop" | — | Deep End |
| 2018 | "Ghostbuster" (Note: "Ghostbuster (Acoustic Version)" was released on 3 March 2018 and "Ghostbuster (Neotune! & Kodura Remix)" was released on 3 May 2018.) | — | —N/a |
| 2018 | "Pak Rai Jai Rak" (Note: "Pak Rai Jai Rak (Instrumental)" was released on 24 October 2018 and "Pak Rai Jai Rak (Acoustic)" on 20 November 2018.) ปากร้ายใจรัก | — | Be Alone |
| 2019 | "Too Late" สายไป | — | Be Alone |
| 2019 | "Khid Mak Na" ("Think Too Much") คิดมากน่า ft. SIRPOPPA The Rapper | — | —N/a |
| 2019 | "Lonely" เหงา | — | Be Alone |
| 2019 | "WORDS" | — | —N/a |
| 2019 | "Tears" น้ำตา | — | Be Alone |
| 2019 | "A Little More" อีกนิดหนึ่ง | — | Be Alone |
| 2019 | "Better" ดีกว่า | — | —N/a |
| 2019 | "One Word, Two Feelings" หนึ่งคำ สองความรู้สึก | — | —N/a |
| 2020 | "PASSCODE" (Note: "Passcode (BATE Remix)" was released on 6 November 2020, "Passcode (Stripped Version)" on 20 November 2020 and "Passcode (feat. F.HERO)" on 20 February 2021.) | — | —N/a |
| 2021 | "Mirror" กระจก | — | Be Alone |
| 2021 | "Be Alone" อยู่คนเดียวให้ได้ | — | Be Alone |
| 2021 | "Jeb Mai Cham" เจ็บไม่จำ | — | Be Alone |
| 2022 | "Psycho" ft. MAIYARAP | — | —N/a |
| 2022 | "LOCATION" ft. ANOTHERBOYTJ | — | —N/a |
| 2023 | "Not A Playgirl" ไม่ได้เจ้าชู้ ft. VANGOE | — | —N/a |
| 2024 | "TIMELINE (feat. Lazyloxy)" (Note: "TIMELINE (feat. Lazyloxy) [Songkran Remix]" was released on 9 March 2024.) | — | —N/a |
| 2024 | "Away [2024 Rock cover ver.]" | — | —N/a |
| 2024 | "What U Call That" | — | —N/a |
| 2024 | "Rare Item" | — | —N/a |
| 2024 | "GOOD ENOUGH?" พอรึยัง..? | — | —N/a |
| 2024 | "Astraphobia" ฟ้าผ่า | — | —N/a |
| 2025 | "WHY NOT?" | — | —N/a |
"—" denotes releases that did not chart or were not released in that region.

=== Original soundtracks ===
| Year | Title | For | Ref |
|---|---|---|---|
| 2015 | "Volg Jou Hart (Follow Your Heart)"; Feat. Madame Mod | My Safari Girl (มาลี เพื่อนรัก..พลังพิสดาร) | |
| 2015 | "Thoe Doen Khao Ma" (เธอเดินเข้ามา, "You Walked In") | Senior | |
| 2017 | "Lost" แพ้แล้วพาล | Club Friday to Be Continued: "Rak Long Chai" (รักลองใจ; "Love Test") | |
| 2018 | "Thoe Thang Nan" (เธอทั้งนั้น; "All Is You") | Love The Thirteen: Look For Me At Dusk (เลิฟเดอะเทอทีน) | |
| 2018 | "Soul" (วิญญาณที่หลุดลอย) | The Black Moon (คืน | เดือน | ดับ) | |
| 2018 | "Khrai Sak Khon" (ใครสักคน; "Someone") | Internet World LIVE (เมืองมายา LIVE) | |
| 2018 | "Khuen Nee" (คืนนี้; "This Night" ) | The Untouched (สัมผัสรัตติกาล) | |
| 2018 | "Phong Tham Nai Rak" (ผงทํานายรัก; "Love Powder") | Colours Of Love (รักน่ะพ่อยาหยี) | |
| 2019 | "Rak Mai Mi Thang Oak" (รักไม่มีทางออก; "Lost") | Club Friday The Series 11 | |
| 2019 | "Rak Hai Mod Hua Jai" (รักให้หมดหัวใจ; "Love With All of My Heart"); Sing with Pete Pol | You, Him and Our Love (เธอเขาเเละรักของเรา) | |
| 2019 | "Don't Look Back" | Mayavi Maling, the Royal Guardian Daughter (มายาวี มาลิง ราชบุตรีผู้พิทักษ์) | |
| 2019 | "So Much World" | Playmobil The Movie | |
| 2020 | "Sitara" (สิตารา) | Sitara Sanaeha coated with poison (สิตารา เสน่หา เคลือบยาพิษ) | |
| 2022 | "Khae" (แค่; "Just") | Game Prattana | |
| 2022 | "The Wall" (หลังกำแพง) | Husband in Disguise (สามีเงินผ่อน) | |
| 2022 | "Ki Rop Kodai" (หัวใจฉันหายไป; "My Heart is Gone") | You Are My Makeup Artist (มัดหัวใจยัยซุปตาร์) | |
| 2022 | "Believe" (ทั้งหัวใจ) | Club Friday The Series 14 Love & Belief | |
| 2023 | "Once upon a time" (กาลครั้งหนึ่ง) | Postman (ไปรษณีย์4โลก) | |

=== As featured artist ===
| Year | Title | Other artist(s) |
|---|---|---|
| 2015 | "Tag Taang Meuan Gun (Zeed Version)" แตกต่างเหมือนกัน (Zeed Ver.) | Getsunova, Earth Pattaravee, See Scape |
| 2015 | "Aesthetic" (emU ver.) | Hiroyuki Sawano |
| 2017 | "Mai Khoei Khit Khae Phuean" (Special Version) แหลกไม่เคยคิดแค่เพื่อน ("Never Thought of You As a Friend") | Mew MBO |
| 2017 | "Diamonds" | Gawvi |
| 2018 | "Caller ID (Acoustic)" | Tyler & Ryan |
| 2018 | "Lust" | Tyler & Ryan |
| 2018 | "Sam Rue Doo" แหลกสามฤดู ("Seasons") | Atip |
| 2018 | "Kleun Nam Lai" แหลกกลืนนํ้าลาย ("Swallow saliva") | Tong Slow |
| 2018 | "Ya Mod Wang" แหลกอย่าหมดหวัง ("Don't Lose Hope") | Tong Slow |
| 2018 | "7 Minutes In Heaven (Acoustic)" | Jada Facer |
| 2019 | "Klab Phrom Thoe" แหลกกลับพร้อมเธอ ("Going Back With You") | Ironboy The Rapper |
| 2019 | Hooked | James Lee |
| 2019 | Fall In Love With You | BRWN |
| 2021 | "We Care" | Alvin Chong, DOLLA & Nicole Lai ft RabbitMac & Jaja |
| 2022 | "Mamacita" | G-Devith |
| 2023 | "Fake Love" | Oak Soe Khant |

=== Other songs ===
| Year | Title | Purpose |
|---|---|---|
| 2013 | "How Far is Close (Special Version)" ไกลแค่ไหน คือ ใกล้ (Special Version) with Getsunova | GRAMMY HOT SINGLE VOL.20 |
| 2016 | "Phro Rao Khu Kan" เพราะเราคู่กัน ("Because We Were Meant to Be Together") | OST Deedo Fruitku TVC |
| 2016 | "Father told me about it" พ่อเล่าให้ฟัง among MBO artists | Condolence song for King Bhumibol Adulyadej death |
| 2019 | "Ni" หนี ("Escape"); Feat YB & Diamond | OST Identity V game |
| 2019 | "Khwam Rak Chan Khue Ther" ความรักฉันคือเธอ ("My Love Is You") | OST Audition Thailand game |
| 2022 | "Push Back"; With BOTCASH | BEHIND THE SMILE |
| 2023 | "Echo of Glory"; With BOTCASH | OST International RoV Competition APL 2023: Thailand |
| 2024 | "The Legacy"; With Scorpio | OST Thailand Game Show 2024: Biggest Dream Revision |
| 2024 | "Khae Mi Thex K Dilaew" แค่มีเธอก็ดีแล้ว ("Just having you is good enough") | OST Soul Land : New World game |

== Filmography ==
=== Television series ===
| Year | Title | Part | Role | Network | Ref |
|---|---|---|---|---|---|
| 2015 | Banlang Mek บัลลังก์เมฆ ("Throne of Clouds") | — | Wirin วิรินทร์ | One HD | |
| 2016 | Love Songs, Love Series | Khon Mai Champen คนไม่จำเป็น ("Unnecessary One") | Mi | GMM 25 | |
| 2016 | #Ped Idol #เป็ดIdol ("Duck Idol") | — | Saengdaet แสงแดด | GMM 25 | |
| 2017 | U-Prince | The Extroverted Humanist ตอน คิริว ("Kiryu episode") | Pinyin พินอิน | GMM 25 | |
| 2017 | My Secret Friend ปิ๊งรัก..นายอายนะ ("Ping Rak .. Mr. Aye") | — | DJ ดีใจ | YouTube | |
| 2017 | Game of Thrones | season 7 | Thai voice of Arya Stark | HBO | |
| 2018 | Dream Teen ฝันให้สุด ("Dream to the end") | — | Namwan น้ำหวาน | ThaiPBS | |
| 2020 | When I Was 16 | — | Da | True4U | |

=== Films ===
| Year | Title | Role | Ref |
|---|---|---|---|
| 2012 | Mass Suicide | | |
| 2015 | Khitaratchaniphon คีตราชนิพนธ์ ("Royal Musical Compositions") | Dao ดาว | |
| 2015 | Senior รุ่นพี่ | Athiti/Mon อธิติ/ม่อน | |
| 2018 | Love Score รักเก็บแต้ม | Music มิวสิก | |
| 2018 | The Diary | Jiji จิจิ | |
| 2018 | The Black Moon คืน | เดือน | ดับ | Multiple roles | |
| 2019 | Pee Nak พี่นาค | Jui จุ้ย | |
| 2023 | Postman ไปรษณีย์4โลก | Mysterious girl จุสาวปริศนา | |

== Awards and nominations ==
| Year | Award | Category | Nominated work | Result | Ref |
|---|---|---|---|---|---|
| 2015 | YouTube Play Button | Gold Play Button | — | Won | |
| 2015 | Daradaily the Great Awards | Rising Female Star of the Year | — | Nominated | |
| 2015 | Daradaily the Great Awards | Best Female Singer of the Year | — | Nominated | |
| 2016 | Thailand National Film Association Awards | Best Original Song | "Thoe Doen Khao Ma" | Won | |
| 2019 | MTV EMA 2019 in Seville | Best Southeast Asia Act | - | Nominated | |

== TV shows ==
| Year | Name of TV Shows | Position | Channel | Production company | Ref |
|---|---|---|---|---|---|
| 2019 | Positive Inking | Host | Facebook Watch | MTV Asia | |
| 2019 | 5 In 5 | Guest EP 1 - 2 | Facebook Watch | MTV Asia | |
| 2021 | LEO Cover Club | Musical Guest | YouTube | LEO Thailand | |
| 2021 | LEO Box Stage | Musical Guest | YouTube | LEO Thailand | |
