= Meronothite =

A Meronothite was the name given to a biblical person from Meronoth. There are only two mentions of them in the bible: Jehdeiah and Jadon. Although Nehemiah 3:7 seems to suggest that Meronoth was close to Gibeon and Mizpah, Mizpah is a doubtful reading. Grollenberg identified it as Beitûniyeh, NW of Gibeon, following earlier studies.
