= Jayden =

- Pronunciation: /ˈdʒeɪdən/ JAY-duhn; French: [ʒazɔ̃]
- Gender: Unisex
- Language: English

Origin
- Language: English
- Origin: Likely a blend of Jay and "den"

Other names
- Alternative spelling: Jaydin; Jaiden; Jaden; Jaeden; Jadin; Jadon; Jadyn; Jaidan; Jaydon; Jaedyn; Jaydan; Jaydyn; Jeydon; Jeyden; Jaidyn; Jaidon

Jayden, Jadin, Jadyn, Jaiden, and Jaden (among other variations) are unisex given names.

== Etymology ==
The modern name invention of Jayden in many scenarios is probably thought of by various other names including blending the "Jay" Jason with the "den" sound from names like Braden, Hayden, Jordan and Zayden.

The biblical name Jadon (or Yadon), Hebrew for "God will judge', appears in the Bible in Nehemiah 3:7.

== Usage and popularity ==
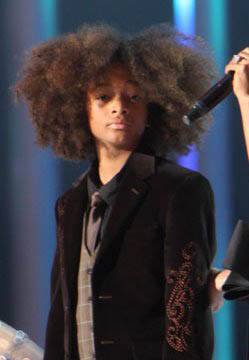
Jaden Smith at the 2009 Nobel Peace Prize concert

The name first appeared on the SSA's list of the 1,000 most popular boys' names in 1994, at number 850. It became dramatically more popular among ethnic minorities in the U.S. thereafter with the naming of Jaden Smith (a variant of Jayden; derived from his mother's name, Jada), the son of two famous actors, in 1998: use of the name about doubled between 1998 and 1999.

Australia saw Jayden as a top 100 name in the state of Victoria in 1989. In the United States, a decade later, Jayden's rank had risen to 62 and peaked at number 4 in 2011 with 16,979 births. The rank of Jayden as of 2017 is 26; variants that have peaked are Jaden (at 74 in 2007), Jaiden (at 171 in 2009), Jadyn (at 248 in 2005), Jadan (at 373 in 2003), and Jaidyn (at 559 in 2008).

In 2022, it was the 35th most popular name given to boys in Canada.

The name's and variants' sudden rise in U.S. usage comes from many places: J names have been historically liked by Americans, and the popularity of two-syllable names ending in n has increased, as has the frequency of distinctive names.

== People ==
=== A ===
- Jayden Adams (2001–2026), South African footballer
- Jayden Addai (born 2005), Dutch footballer
- Jayden Antwi-Nyame (born 1998), English footballer
- Jayden Atkinson (born 2001), Australian field hockey player
- Jayden Attard (born 1986), Australian rules footballer

=== B ===
- Jayden Bartels (born 2004), American social media personality
- Jayden Bellamy (born 2003), American football player
- Jayden Bennetts (born 2001), English footballer
- Jayden Berrell (born 1995), Australian rugby league footballer
- Jayden Bezzant (born 1996), New Zealand basketball player
- Jayden Bogle (born 2000), English footballer
- Jayden Braaf (born 2002), Dutch footballer
- Jayden Brailey (born 1996), Australian rugby league player

=== C ===
- Jayden Campbell (born 2000), Australian rugby league player
- Jayden Clarke (born 2001), English footballer

=== D ===
- Jayden Da (born 2002), American soccer player
- Jayden Dalke (1996–2026), Canadian football player
- Jayden Daniels (born 2000), American football player
- Jayden Danns (born 2006), English footballer
- Jayden Davis (born 2001), English footballer
- Jayden de Laura (born 2001), American football player
- Jayden Denegal (born 2004), American football player
- Jaiden Dittfach (born 1997), better known as Jaiden Animations, American YouTuber and animator

=== E ===
- Jayden El-Jalkh (born 1997), Lebanese-Australian rugby league footballer

=== F ===
- Jayden Fevrier (born 2003), English footballer

=== G ===
- Jayden Gardner (born 2000), American basketball player
- Jayden Goodwin (born 2001), Australian cricketer
- Jayden Gorman (born 2003), Australian footballer
- Jayden Greig (born 2003), Canadian actor

=== H ===
- Jayden Hadler (born 1993), Australian swimmer
- Jayden Halbgewachs (born 1997), Canadian ice hockey player
- Jayden Harris (born 1999), English footballer
- Jayden Harrison (born 2001), American football player
- Jayden Hayward (born 1987), New Zealand rugby union player
- Jayden Hibbert (born 2004), American soccer player
- Jayden Higgins (born 2002), American football player
- Jayden Hodges (born 1993), Australian rugby player
- Jayden Hunt (born 1995), Australian rules footballer

=== L ===
- Jayden Laverde (born 1996), Australian rules footballer
- Jayden Leader (born 2003), Australian footballer
- Jayden Lennox (born 1994), New Zealand cricketer
- Jayden Levitt (born 1986), South African cricketer
- Jayden Lienou (born 2008), Welsh footballer
- Jayden Loving (born 2003), American football player

=== M ===
- Jayden Maiava (born 2004), American football player
- Jayden Mandal (born 2005), American football player
- Jayden McGowan, American football player
- Jayden Meghoma (born 2006), English footballer
- Jayden Mitchell-Lawson (born 1999), English footballer
- Jayden Murray (born 1997), American baseball player

=== N ===
- Jayden Nelson (born 2002), Canadian soccer player
- Jayden Ngamanu (born 1997), Australian rugby union player
- Jayden Nikorima (born 1996), New Zealand-Australian rugby league player

=== O ===
- Jayden Ojeda (born 1999), Australian racing driver
- Jayden Okunbor (born 1997), Australian rugby league footballer
- Jayden Onen (born 2001), English footballer
- Jayden Oosterwolde (born 2001), Dutch footballer

=== P ===
- Jayden Peevy (born 1999), American football player
- Jayden Perron (born 2005), Canadian ice hockey player
- Jayden Pitt (born 1992), Australian rules footballer
- Jayden Post (born 1989), Australian rules footballer
- Jayden Price (born 2000), American football player

=== Q ===
- Jayden Quaintance (born 2007), American basketball player

=== R ===
- Jayden Reed (born 2000), American football player
- Jayden Reid (born 2001), English footballer
- Jayden Reid (soccer) (born 2001), American soccer player
- Jayden Revri (born 1999), English actor
- Jayden Richardson (born 2000), English footballer

=== S ===
- Jayden Sawyer (born 1993), Australian paralympic athlete
- Jayden Schaper (born 2001), South African golfer
- Jayden Schofield (born 1992), Australian rules footballer
- Jayden Scrubb (born 2000), American basketball player
- Jayden Seales (born 2001), Trinidadian cricketer
- Jayden Sellers (born 2007), American football player
- Jayden Short (born 1996), Australian rules footballer
- Jayden Stockley (born 1993), English footballer
- Jayden Struble (born 2001), American ice hockey player
- Jayden Sullivan (born 2001), Australian rugby league footballer
- Jayden Sweeney (born 2001), English footballer

=== T ===
- Jayden Tanner (born 2000), Australian rugby league footballer
- Jayden Thomas (born 2002), American football player
- Jayden Turfkruier (born 2002), Dutch footballer
- Jayden Theophile (born 2011), American Actor and Singer

=== W ===
- Jayden Walker (born 1996), Italian rugby league player
- Jayden Wareham (born 2003), English footballer
- Jayden Warn (born 1994), Australian wheelchair rugby player
- Jayden Williams (born 2003), American football player

=== Y ===
- Jayden Yuan (born 1997), Chinese actor and martial artist

== Other variants ==
- Jaiden Animations (born 1997), American YouTuber
- Jaidon Anthony (born 1999), English footballer
- Jadon Canady (born 2003), American football player
- Jaidon Codrington (born 1984), American boxer
- Jadyn Davis (born 2005), American football player
- Jaydn Denly (born 2006), English cricketer
- Jadyn Douglas (born 1985), Puerto Rican singer-songwriter
- Jaidynn Diore Fierce (born 1988/1989), American drag performer
- Jaeden Graham (born 1995), American football player
- Jaydon Grant (born 1998), American football player
- Jadon Haselwood (born 2001), American football player
- Jaiyden Hunt (born 1998), Australian rugby league footballer
- Jaiden Kaine, Cuban-American actor
- Jaiden Kucharski (born 2002), Australian footballer
- Jadon Lavik (born 1978), American singer-songwriter
- Jaedon LeDee (born 1999), American basketball player
- Jaeden Martell (born 2003), American actor
- Jadyn Matthews (born 1999), Jamaican-American footballer
- Jaeden Mercure (born 2003), Canadian soccer player
- Jaydn Ott (born 2002), American football player
- Jaydon Paddock (born 2001), British trampoline gymnast
- Jadon Philogene (born 2002) , English footballer
- Jadon Sancho (born 2000), English footballer
- Jaedyn Shaw (born 2004), American soccer player
- Jaidyn Stephenson (born 1999), Australian rules footballer
- Jaydn Su'a (born 1997), Samoan rugby league footballer
- Jaiden Waggoner (born 1997), American soccer player
- Jadin Wong (1913–2010), American singer
- Jadyn Wong, Canadian actress

== Fictional characters ==
- Jayden, name given to Data in "Thine Own Self", a 1994 episode of Star Trek: The Next Generation
- Jayden Hoyles, in 2019 Netflix series Daybreak
- Jayden Hunt, in the British soap opera Doctors
- Jayden Johnson, in the 2009 American TV film An American Girl: Chrissa Stands Strong
- Jayden Shiba, leader in the TV series Power Rangers Samurai
- Jayden Warley, in the Australian soap opera Neighbours
- Norman Jayden, an FBI agent from the video game Heavy Rain

== See also ==
- Jaden
- Jadin (disambiguation)
- Jaidon River
