= Yadin =

Yadin is a Hebrew name, used as both a first and last name, which comes from the root word "din" (law or judgment). Yadin is the future tense of the verb conjugated in the third person, meaning “(he) will enact justice,” “(he) will make law” or “(he) will judge.”

== Antiquity ==
The word Yadin appears in the Hebrew Bible (Genesis 49:16, Deuteronomy 32:36, 1 Samuel 2:10 and elsewhere) usually referring to the Almighty who will judge nations "Yadin Amim Bemeisharim" and similarly in other contexts.

== Other biblical references ==
- Genesis 49:16
- Deuteronomy 32:36
- Isaiah 2:10
- Psalm 7:9
- Psalm 9:9
- Psalm 72:2
- Psalm 96:10
- Psalm 110:6
- Psalm 135:14
- Job 36:31

== People ==
=== Surname ===
- Avihai Yadin (born 1986), an Israeli football (soccer) player
- Azzan Yadin, an associate professor of Jewish Studies at Rutgers University
- Yigael Yadin (1917–1984), an Israeli archeologist, politician, and soldier

=== First name ===
- Yadin Dudai (born 1944), an Israeli neuroscientist

== See also ==
- Beth Din
- Yadin Yadin
