= V3 (group) =

American urban contemporary gospel group

- Also known as: V Three
- Origin: Atlanta, Georgia, U.S.
- Genres: Christian R&B, CCM, urban contemporary gospel, contemporary R&B, soul
- Years active: 2006–present
- Label: EMI Gospel
- Members: LaToya Vinson; Sacha Vinson; Shelley Vinson
- Website: v3worldwide.com

V3, also known as V Three, are an African-American all-female sister Christian R&B and urban contemporary gospel music trio, who primarily play contemporary R&B songs. They come from Atlanta, Georgia, where the group started making music in 2006. They have released a studio album, V3. This album was their breakthrough release on the Billboard magazine charts.

== Background ==
The all-female African-American sisters' group are from Atlanta, Georgia, where they formed in 2006. They are from oldest to youngest, LaToya Kathleen Vinson, Sacha Jo Vinson, and Shelley Dionne Vinson-Bullock. Their parents are Thomas and Dr. Carolyn Vinson, who are the pastors of High Point Christian Tabernacle located in the city of Smyrna, Georgia.

== Music history ==
The group started in 2006, with their first studio album, V3, released on August 1, 2006, from EMI Gospel. The album peaked at number 39 on the Billboard magazine Gospel Albums chart. Their second album, Alive, was released on November 14, 2016.

== Members ==
=== Current members ===
- LaToya Kathleen Vinson (born November 6, 1976)
- Sacha Jo Vinson (born March 4, 1978)
- Shelley Dionne Vinson-Bullock (born May 30, 1980)

== Discography ==
Studio albums

List of selected studio albums, with selected chart positions
| Title | Album details | Peak chart positions |
| Title | Album details | US Gosp |
|---|---|---|
| V3 | Released: August 1, 2006; Label: EMI Gospel; Formats: CD, digital download, streaming | 39 |
| Alive | Released: November 14, 2016; Label: Virtuosity; Formats: CD, digital download, streaming | — |
