= Dolla (girl group) =

Malaysian girl group

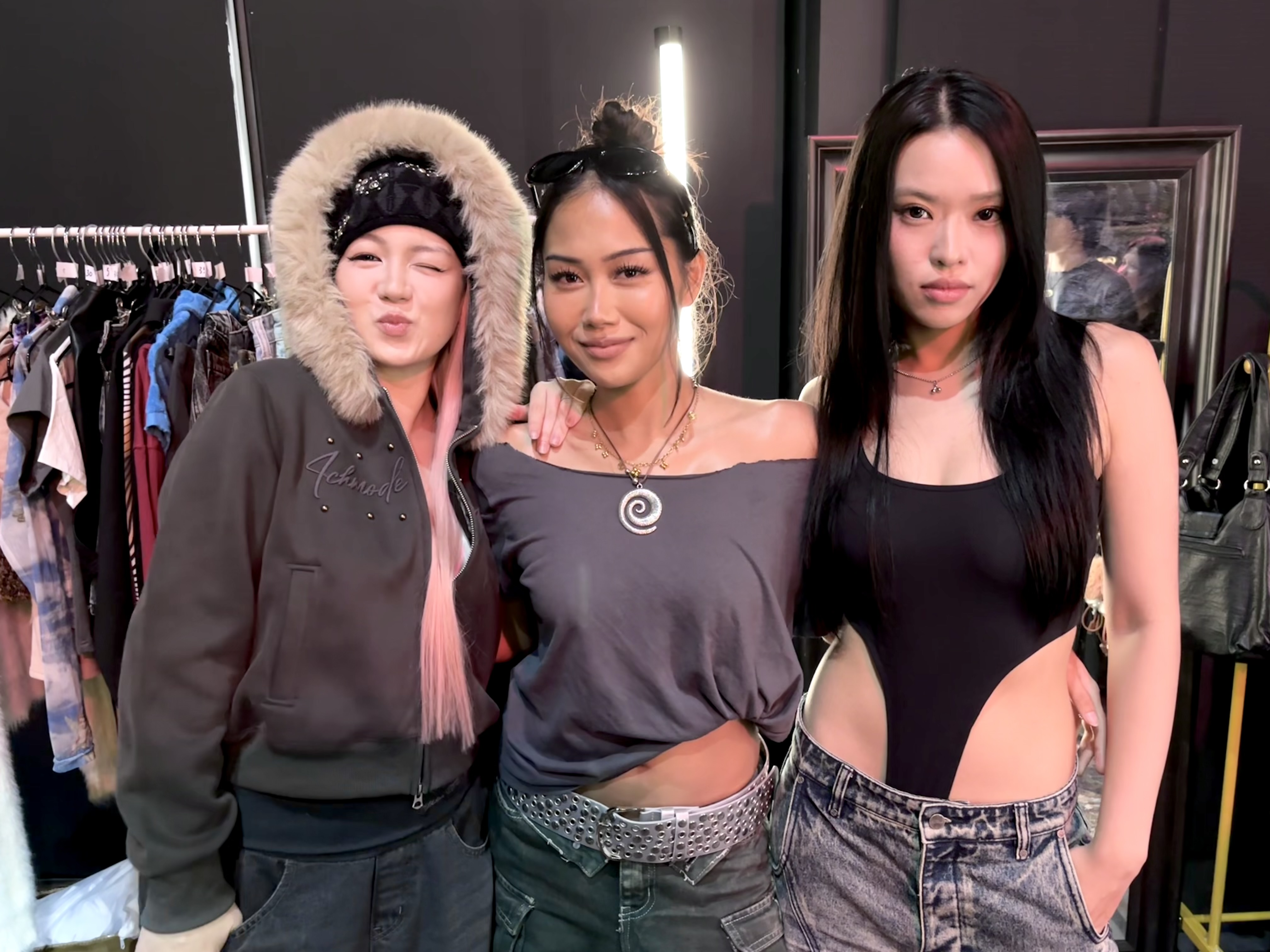
- DOLLA in 2026

Background information
- Origin: Kuala Lumpur, Malaysia
- Genres: Pop; R&B; EDM; Ballad; Hip Hop; Reggaeton
- Years active: 2019–present
- Label: Universal Music Malaysia
- Members: Sabronzo; Tabby; Angel
- Past members: Syasya Rizal

DOLLA (stylised in all-caps) is a Malaysian girl group formed in 2019 by Universal Music Malaysia. The group currently consists of Sabronzo, Tabby, and Angel. Originally a quartet, the group then continued as a trio following the departure of one of their original members, Syasya, who announced her permanent departure from the group in April 2024. They signed a contract with Universal Music Malaysia and released their debut single "Dolla Make You Wanna" on 20 March 2020.

The group has released a number of hit songs in Malaysia, including the song "Bad", which topped the RIM Domestic Singles chart. They sing in Malay and English, and are known for their vocal, dance and rap elements in their performances. They have attracted some attention in the media as well as controversy. Their fandom is called "iDolla".

== Career ==
=== 2019–2020: Formation and early career ===
Dolla was formed in August 2019 through auditions. The members did not know each other prior to their auditions.

Dolla gained pre-debut public attention for their performance at the #RapstarEra Final at The Bee Republika. On 20 March 2020, they released their debut single "Dolla Make You Wanna", which was produced by Australian composer and producer Bryan B, and written by Zamaera, Bryan B, Shou Raion, and Luca Sickta.

Dolla was one of seventeen Malaysian artists to collaborate with Universal Music Malaysia to produce the song, "#jangankeluar" (translation: "Don't Go Out), a hip hop song produced by Yonnyboii. The song was released as part of a public health appeal to remind Malaysians to keep to the Malaysian Government's Movement Control Order during the COVID-19 pandemic.

The group, along with fellow Southeast Asian artists, collaborated on the song, "HEAL", produced by Star Music, a wholly owned subsidiary of ABS-CBN Corporation.

Dolla released "Impikan", and its English version, "Watch Me Glow" in October 2020. "Impikan" became the group's most viewed music video, with 7.7 million views.

=== 2021–2023: Rise to popularity, DOLLA mini showcase, and 'New Classic' ===
DOLLA released a festive song for the Eid-al Fitr celebrations, titled "Raya Raya Raya", gaining millions of views during the festive period. During the same period, they starred in the telemovie "Dolla Watch Me Glow", based on the true story of their rise to fame. "Dolla Watch Me Glow" was directed by Izuan Mokhtar, and aired on Astro Citra on the 22nd of May 2021.

On the 24th of September 2021, Dolla released their third single "Berani", accompanied by an animated music video. They were also featured on the New York Times Square billboard as part of Spotify Malaysia and Singapore's EQUAL campaign, which "aims to foster equity for women in audio and nurturing equity by highlighting female artistes around the world".

On 13 November 2021, Dolla was nominated for the 34th Bintang Popular Berita Harian Awards as the Most Popular Female New Artist and won in that category, making the group the first all-female group to win the category.

Their fourth single, "Bad", released on the 11th of February 2022, was written by Swedish composers Ludwig Lindell and Karl-Oscar 'Cage' Gummesson. The song was released in two different languages, namely English and Malay, and accompanied by an official music video, which gained 100,000 views within an hour of release.

On the 19th of February, DOLLA performed their first mini-showcase, "DOLLA Mini Showcase", at Nero Event Space, Petaling Jaya Performing Arts Centre (PJPAC), Petaling Jaya, Selangor. Tickets for the showcase sold out within 5 minutes of its announcement. Two days after the showcase, DOLLA released their first mini-album, "DOLLA: Mini Album", which sold 1,000 units within 24 hours of its release. The mini album was accompanied by a photo book, as well as individual photo cards of each member.

2022 was a year of collaboration for DOLLA, releasing another festive song in April, titled "Suara Lebaran Kita", a collaboration with Hael Husaini. In June the same year, they released a collaboration single, "FIGHT", in collaboration with Singaporean gaming giant Garena, to promote the game "Free Fire" in the campaign "Free Fire For All Cultures". In September, they released the song "Mungkin Ini Adalah Lagu Yang Paling Sedih Pernah Ku Buat" with Naim Daniel, followed by "Sudi" with Yonnyboii in December.

DOLLA started 2023 with a bang, performing at the Kuala Lumpur leg of Seen Festival, on 28 January 2023 in Axiata Arena. They were the only local group to perform, appearing alongside South Korean acts NCT DREAM, WayV, KARD dan ALICE. In February 2023, they released their fifth single, 'Look At This'.

On 17 November 2023, DOLLA released their first studio album, 'New Classic', consisting of 9 songs, alongside a music video for the title track, 'CLASSIC', composed by Hyuk Shin (Hangul: 신혁), MREY, Papi Lee, BARD, Kyler Niko, and Pauline Cerrilla.

=== 2024–present: International recognition, Syasya's withdrawal from the group, and solo concerts ===
In March 2024, DOLLA achieved international recognition when they were chosen to represent Malaysia in a new Chinese television program titled 'Show It All' (Chinese: 百分百出品), centering around cultural exchange between girl groups all around the world, produced by EXO's Lay Zhang (Chinese: 张艺兴). The program was aired on MangoTV.

On April 8, 2024, DOLLA announced that Syasya would be leaving the group for personal reasons. The remaining members of the group released a statement explaining that while they still maintain a good relationship with Syasya, they reached the decision to continue as a trio. The group also stated that following Syasya's exit from DOLLA, she would not be performing with them in the future. Syasya subsequently got married immediately following her departure from the group.

In May 2024, DOLLA announced that they would be holding their debut concert "DOLLA RE:BIRTH The Experience" at Zepp Kuala Lumpur on the 3rd of August 2024. In conjunction with the concert, they released a special song, "Here4U", dedicated to the iDollas.

In January 2025, Dolla collaborated with Thai-Swiss singer Tobii in the English version of his song "Bad Girls Like You".

On the 9th of May 2025, Dolla released their new single "MWA!" in two versions, Malay and English, accompanied by a music video of the Malay version of the song which has garnered almost 4 million views. The song charted at number 4 on the RIM Domestic Singles chart.

On 15 September, the group announced a two concert mini tour titled "DOLLA Good Girls Gone Bad" for Singapore and Kuala Lumpur by end of 2025. They would perform in Singapore on the 22nd of November, and in Kuala Lumpur on the 6th of December.

On the 26th September 2025, Sabronzo married Dutch DJ Ryan Fieret, then-frontman of Dash Berlin, in Bali, Indonesia, becoming the group's second member to get married.

On the 31st of October 2025, Dolla digitally released the Chinese version of their single "Mwa!" in collaboration with Elva Suyan as a separate single to the original and English versions of the song. The release was accompanied by a lyric video.

On the 2nd of November 2025, Dolla's Instagram teased their next single after "Mwa!" titled "Question". The teaser revealed a release date of 6 November 2025 and featured a man eating fast food.

On the 6th of November 2025, Dolla released their new single "Question" with an accompanying music video, which garnered 100 views within its first 24 hours. Later on the 16th, the music video was removed from all digital platforms, in response to a statement by the Minister in the Prime Minister's Department (Religious Affairs), Datuk Dr Mohd Na'im Mokhtar, where he stated that the girls needed to respect the nations boundaries and sensitivities as a multi-racial and pluralistic society. This comes after the minister announced he was looking to impose Sharia law on Muslim celebrities in Malaysia. The decision received mixed opinions, with many saying what the girls were wearing was too revealing and humiliated Muslim women, whilst others felt that the decision to remove the video was unnecessary and that the girls should be allowed to dress as they please. Despite the removal of the music video, the song reached number one on the Malaysian iTunes chart. On 21 November the group released the English version of the song digitally.

On the 21st of November 2025, SAH Entertainment announced on their Instagram that the groups upcoming 'GOOD Girls GONE Bad' concert in Kuala Lumpur was cancelled, citing disorganization as the reason why the concert could not go ahead. This comes after the group's concert in Singapore under the same title was quietly cancelled. Six days following this announcement, a group fan meet titled "DOLLA Exclusive Fanmeet" was announced to take place on the 6th of December 2025, the date the concert in Kuala Lumpur was originally scheduled to be held. The fan meet was available for those who had purchased tickets to the "GOOD Girls GONE Bad" concert as well as fans who purchased merchandise on site on the day.

On the 7th of February 2026, the group's fan club iDolla posted on their Instagram page that the official fan club would be closing after six years of operation since 2020. All of the club's WhatsApp and Telegram groups were handed over to Universal Music Malaysia. This came following an incident where the club addressed an issue about a certain online account causing discomfort in the fanbase. The remaining iDolla Singapore and Indonesian accounts have not responded to the closure of the Malaysian club.

On the 16th of July 2026 Dolla's official Instagram page removed all of the groups posts with a reel shwoing the groups new logo. The following day a preview of their upcoming single titled "G.O.A.T." was uploaded to YouTube, Instagram and TikTok.

== Members ==
Current members
- Sabronzo (Wan Sabrina binti Wan Rusli; born 7 March 1995 (age 31) in Kuala Lumpur)
- Tabby (Tabitha Ariel Lam Lianne; born 18 March 2000 (age 26) in Kuala Lumpur)
- Angel (Angelina Chai Ka Ying; born 11 January 2001 (age 25) in Kuching, Sarawak)

Past members
- Syasya (Noorsyasya Afiqah binti Shahrizal; born 15 January 2001 (age 25) in Kuala Lumpur)

== Discography ==
=== Studio albums ===
Title	Album details	Track
New Classic	Released: 17 November 2023; Label: Universal Music Malaysia; Formats: CD, Digital download	1. Classic; 2. Damelo; 3. MASA; 4. Drip; 5. Best Side; 6. BO$$ Up; 7. Damelo (Eng Ver.)

=== Extended plays ===
List of EPs, with release date and label shown
Title	Album details
Dolla: Mini Album	Released: 21 February 2022; Label: Universal Music Malaysia; Formats: CD, Photobook, Photocard

=== Singles ===
==== As lead artist ====
List of singles as lead artist, with selected chart positions, showing year released and album name
Title	Year	Peak chart positions			Album
Title	Year	MLY			Album
Title	Year	IFPI (Note: The Official Southeast Asian Chart launched 23 January 2025. No official 'Dolla' chart history page, however the groups charting history can be searched.)	RIM (Note: The Top 10 Domestic Singles chart was reconfigured into a Malay songs chart, beginning the week ending 24 March 2022.)	Songs (Note: Billboard's Hits of the World chart launched and was first issued on the date February 19, 2022.)	Album
"Dolla Make You Wanna"	2020	*	–	*	Dolla: Mini Album
"Impikan"	2020	*	–	*	Dolla: Mini Album
"Watch Me Glow" ("Impikan" English version)	2020	*	–	*	Dolla: Mini Album
"Raya Raya Raya" (Karazey remix released in 2024)	2021	10	3	16	Dolla: Mini Album
"Berani" (original or acoustic version)	2021	*	–	–	Dolla: Mini Album
"Bad" (original or English version)	2022	*	1	10	Dolla: Mini Album
"Suara Lebaran Kita" (with Hael Husaini)	2022	*	–	–	Non-album singles
"Fight"	2022	*	–	–	Non-album singles
"Mungkin Ini Adalah Lagu Yang Paling Sedih Pernah Ku Buat" (with Naim Daniel)	2022	*	–	–	Non-album singles
"Sudi" (with Yonnyboii)	2022	*	–	–	Non-album singles
"Look At This"	2023	*	–	–	Non-album singles
"DAMELO" (with Hard Lights, or English version)	2023	*	4	–	New Classic
"CLASSIC"	2023	*	–	–	New Classic
"BO$$ UP"	2024	*	–	–	New Classic
"Here4U" (original or English version)	2024	*	–	–	Non-album singles
"Bad Girls Like You" (English version with Tobii)	2025	–	–	–	Non-album singles
"MWA!" (original or English version)	2025	–	4	–	Non-album singles
"MWA! - Chinese Version" (with Elva Suyan)	2025	–	–	–	Non-album singles
"Question" (original or English version)	2025	–	–	–	Non-album singles
"G.O.A.T."	2026	–	–	–	Non-album singles
"Ugly"	2026	–	–	–	Non-album singles
"—" denotes a recording that did not chart or was not released in that territory. "*" denotes that the chart did not exist at that time.

==== Other songs ====
Title	Year	Other artist/s	Album
"#jangankeluar"	2020	yonnyboii, Shila Amzah, Hafiz Hamidun, Rabbit Mac, Shalma Eliana, Sophia Liana, Alvin Chong, Bella Astillah, Luca Sickta, Kmy Kmo, Tuju, Kowachee, ASYRFNSIR, Abubakarxli, Siqma, Malik Abdullah	Non-album singles
"Heal"	2020	Jayda, Jona, Kyla, KZ Tandingan, Lesha, Moira Dela Torre, Xela, Yura Yunita, Rinni Wulandari, Valentina Ploy, Haneri, Haven, Shalma Eliana	Non-album singles
"We Care"	2021	Jannine Weigel, Alvin Chong, Nicole Lai, RabbitMac Jaja	Non-album singles

== Filmography ==
Film
Year	Title	Network	Role	Notes
2021	Dolla: Watch Me Glow	Astro Citra	Themselves	First Debut as Actor

Television

Year	Title	Network	Role	Notes
2021	Dapur Panas	TV3	Themselves	Guest Artists
2022	I Can See Your Voice Malaysia (Season 5)	TV3	Themselves	Guest Artists
2023	Holla Dolla	Astro Ria	Themselves	Hosting & Guest

== Tours and Concerts ==
All concerts and tours that Dolla has performed in, in chronological order.

=== Headlining Concerts ===
- #DOLLAVILLA 2023
- DOLLA RE:BIRTH The Experience 2024
- MWA! Heist 2025
- K - Wave Super Concert 2025 (Co-headlined with Nmixx).
- DOLLA Good Girls GONE Bad 2025 (cancelled)

=== Showcase ===
- DOLLA Mini Showcase 2022

=== Other selected performances ===
- Seen Festival 2023
- Hauseboom Festival 2023 2023
- Borneo Sonic Music Festival 2023 2023
- Show It All 百分百出品 2024
- Pinkfish Music & Arts Festival 2024 2024
- Hauseboom Festival 2024 2024
- Borneo Sonic Music Festival 2025 2025
- Sunway Velocity New Year's Eve Countdown Party 2025! 2025
- OMODA & JAECOO Carnival 2025
- Serenades & Body Rolls World Tour 2025 (Guest Appearance on Jay Park's tour).
- ROUND Festival 2025 2025
- Latihan Pestapora (Malaysia) 2025 2025
- Air Asia Hauseboom Festival 2025 2025
- K-Spark 2026

== Awards and nominations ==
Year	Award	Category	Nominated work	Result
2021	34th Bintang Popular Berita Harian Awards (ABPBH)	Most Popular Female New Artist	DOLLA	Won
2021	34th Bintang Popular Berita Harian Awards (ABPBH)	Popular Collaboration/Duo/Group Artis	"Dolla Make You Wanna"	Nominated
2022	Women Of Excellence Awards (WOEA)	Best New Artist Of The Year	DOLLA	Won
2022	EH!'s Style Awards	Choice Magazine Cover Celebrity	DOLLA	Won
2022	Anugerah Meletop Era 2021 (AME 2021)	Top Meletop Group/Duo	DOLLA	Won
2023	Gempak Most Wanted Awards 2022 (GMWA 2022)	Lagu Trending Tergempak 2022	"Bad"	Won
2023	Gempak Most Wanted Awards 2022 (GMWA 2022)	Video Muzik Tergempak 2022	"Bad"	Won
2023	35th Bintang Popular Berita Harian Awards (ABPBH)	Most Popular Group/Duo	DOLLA	Won
2023	TikTok Awards Malaysia 2023 (TAM 2023)	Celebrity of the Year	DOLLA	Nominated
2023	36th Bintang Popular Berita Harian Awards (ABPBH)	Most Popular Group/Duo	DOLLA	Won
2024	McMillanWoods Global Awards 2024 (MCM 2024)	Breakthrough Artist Group Award Of The Year	DOLLA	Won
2025	Gempak Most Wanted Awards 2024 (GMWA 2024)	Video Muzik Tergempak 2024	"Classic"	Top 5
2025	Anugerah Meletop Era 2025 (AME 2025)	Meletop Era Group/Duo	DOLLA	TBA
2025	Anugerah Meletop Era 2025 (AME 2025)	Meletop Era Song	"Classic"	TBA
2025	Anugerah Melodi Terhangat 2025	Selebriti Muzik Paling Onz Terhangat	DOLLA	Nominated
2025	Anugerah Bintang Popular Berita Harian ke-37	Artis Kolaborasi/Duo/Berkumpulan Popular	DOLLA	Nominated
2026	Gempak Most Wanted Awards 2025 (GMWA 2025)	Video Muzik Tergempak 2025	"MWA!"	Nominated
