= Jada (given name) =

Jada is a feminine given name, a variant of Jade, which comes from the precious stone of the same name.

== List of people with the given name Jada ==
- Jada (biblical), a male figure in the Book of Chronicles in the Old Testament
- Jada (born 1993), Danish singer
- Jada Cacchilli, participant in American reality television series Bad Girls Club
- Jada Facer, American actress best known for Melissa & Joey
- Jada Habisch (born 2002), American ice hockey player
- Jada Hart (born 1998), American tennis player
- Jada Mathyssen-Whyman, Australian football (soccer) goalkeeper
- Jada Pinkett Smith (born 1971), American actress and singer
- Jada Renales, Trinidad and Tobago badminton player
- Jada Rowland (born 1943), American actress and illustrator

== See also ==
- Ja'da bint al-Ash'at, wife of Hasan bin Ali, one of the Prophet Muhammad's grandsons
- Jaida Essence Hall, American drag queen
