= New Classic (Dolla album) =

- Digital cover

Studio album by Dolla
- Released: November 17, 2023
- Genres: Pop; R&B; EDM; ballad; hip-hop; reggaeton
- Length: 20:56
- Languages: Malay; English; Spanish
- Label: Universal Music Malaysia
- Producers: Hyuk Shin; Mrey, Papi Lee; Bard

Dolla chronology
Dolla: Mini Album (2022)	New Classic (2023)

Singles from New Classic
- 1. "Damelo (with Hard Lights)" Released: 4 August 2023; 2. "Classic" Released: 18 November 2023

New Classic is the first studio album by Malaysian girl group Dolla. It was released by Universal Music Malaysia on the 17th of November 2023, and contains seven tracks including two singles, "Damelo" and "Classic", and an English version of its lead-single. Although being the second single released, the track "Classic" is the title track of the album.

== Background and release ==
New Classic was first teased at the end of the music video for the albums lead-single "Damelo", with a snippet of the title track playing in the credits. On 3 November 2023, the official Dolla Instagram page made several posts announcing Dolla's first studio album, followed by posts of different symbols. These symbols each represented one of the seven songs on the tracklist, along with a timeline for the albums release for the 17th of November 2025. On the 7th of November, concept pictures of the four members at the time; Angel, Tabby, Sabronzo & Syasya were released, alongside the album titles name "New Classic".

On 12 November, a mini trailer revealing the albums cover art was released, alongside concept face-shots of the members for the upcoming title track "Classic". Between the 12th and 13th, the entire seven song tracklist was revealed, alongside credits. Whilst on the 14th it was announced that the music video for "Classic" would release in 3 days alongside the album.

At 12am local time, the album was digitally released globally. Whilst pre-ordering for merch and a physical CD album copy was opened on the 22nd of November. Additionally fragrance company Cerm would collab with Dolla to release a roll on fragrance.

On 24 February 2025, Dolla announced that track 6 "BO$$ UP" would receive an exclusive dance video, with a trailer for the video following the next day. The video released three days later on the 28th and featured the CERM x DOLLA perfume.

== #DOLLAVILLA ==
#DOLLAVILLA was a promotive concert, held by Dolla on the 21st of November 2023, at The Diplomat KL, estate. Guests were privately invited to attend, mostly from the media. However fans were able to win passes for the experience. Tracks; "Classic", "Damelo" and "Drip" were performed at the concert.

== Composition ==
Composition for New Classic began roughly one year prior to its release. The album's composition included award winning South Korean producer Hyuk Shin as well as incorporated various members of Dolla, particularly in the fourth track.

The album's title track "Classic" has been described as "dominant, powerful and empowering" with a "cheerful bridge" and is the groups first anti-drop. "Damelo" the second track was described as a Techno-Latin, with a Latin vibe and was targeted towards the groups growing Latin American audience.

== Track listing ==
New Classic track listing
No.	Title	Lyrics	Music	Production/Arrangement	Length
1.	"Classic"	Kyler Niko; Paulina Cerrilla	Hyuk Shin; MRey; Papi Lee; Tha Bard; Kyler Niko; Paulina Cerrilla	Hyuk Shin; MRey; Papi Lee; Tha Bard	3:14
2.	"Damelo (featuring Hard Lights)"	Joshua Tan; SYA	Joshua Tan	Joshua Tan	3:05
3.	"Masa"	Harli; Rio	Harli; Rio; Alex Chally Keys	Rio; Alex Chally Keys; SonaOne	2:26
4.	"Drip"	Angel; Tabby; Syasya; Brendan Lim Seng Meng; Denise Chan Li-hsia; Seow Seng Tack; Wee Zhen Yong; SYA	Angel; Tabby; Syasya; Brendan Lim Seng Meng; Denise Chan Li-hsia; Seow Seng Tack; Wee Zhen Yong	MFMF	2:32
5.	"Best Side"	Harli; Rio	Harli; Rio; SonaOne	SonaOne	3:32
6.	"BO$$ UP"	JJean; Charlotte Day Wilson	Hyuk Shin; ByHVN; JJean; Charlotte Day Wilson	Hyuk Shin; ByHVN	3:02
7.	"Damelo - English Version (featuring Hard Lights)"	Joshua Tan; SYA	Joshua Tan	Joshua Tan	3:05
Total length:					20:56

== Awards and nominations ==
Year	Award	Category	Nominated work	Result
2025	Anugerah Meletop Era 2025 (AME 2025)	Meletop Era Song	"Classic"	TBA

== Charts ==
Weekly chart performance for "New Classic"
Chart (2025)	Peak position	Song
Malaysia Domestic(RIM)	4	"Damelo"

== Release history ==
Release history for New Classic
Region	Date	Format	Label	Ref.
Various	17 November 2023	Digital download; streaming	Universal Music Malaysia	
Malaysia	17 November 2023	CD	Universal Music Malaysia	
