= Need for Speed: Most Wanted =

Need for Speed: Most Wanted may refer to:

- Need for Speed: Most Wanted (2005 video game), developed by EA Black Box
- Need for Speed: Most Wanted (2012 video game), developed by Criterion Games
