= Jadon =

Name list

Jadon is a Hebrew given name meaning "God has heard", "thankful" (according to Strong's Concordance), "a judge", or "whom God has judged" and the name of two characters in Biblical history.

== Jadon the Meronothite ==
Jadon the Meronothite was one of the builders of the wall of Jerusalem in the Book of Nehemiah in the Hebrew Bible.

== Prophet Jadon ==
According to Flavius Josephus, Jadon was the name of a minor prophet referred to in his Antiquities of the Jews VIII,8,5 who is thought to have been the man of God mentioned in 1 Kings 13:1. In the Lives of the Prophets, he is called Joad. Rabbinic tradition identifies him with Iddo.

== See also ==
- Jayden
