= Jaden Hair =

Hong Kong–American chef

- Born: Hong Kong
- Culinary career
- Cooking style: Chinese cuisine
- Website: jadenrae.com

Jaden Rae (formerly Jaden Hair) is a Hong Kong-American television chef, cookbook author, food columnist, photographer, and blogger. She specializes in fast, fresh, and simple Asian cooking.

== Career ==
In 2005, she founded Steamy Kitchen, a food blog and website.

Rae has been regularly featured on WFLA-TV's Daytime Show and The List, and has been a columnist for Discovery Health Channel, TLC, BlogHer, and The Tampa Tribune. She has been also appeared on The Today Show, Recipe Rehab, Martha Stewart Living Radio, and Tampa Bay's CBS10. In 2011, SlashFood readers voted Rae as its "#1 hottest woman in food". Forbes and The Daily Meal have called Rae one of the best food bloggers.

=== Microdosing ===
Rae has been open about her former battle with depression and alcoholism, and how microdosing with psychedelics has allowed her to overcome addiction without the effects of traditional antidepressants. In spring 2022, she released the Microdosing Guide And Journal, a "tutorial-workbook combination that was created as a companion for those who microdose (or who are looking to start) and as a way to track and reflect on their journey". In 2023, she became a monthly columnist for Vegas Cannabis Magazine, contributing 2 articles per issue focused on educational information about psychedelics and how to create psychedelic-infused dishes.

In 2023, she created the Psychedelic Journey Without Psychedelics event, which was designed to help people "quiet the mind, turn inward, and connect with their intuition and inner voice" through the use of breathwork, music, visuals, and "uplifting" scents. It initially launched at the Radiance Wellness & Music Festival at Las Vegas' Area 15 venue.

== Personal ==
Rae was born in Hong Kong and raised in North Platte, Nebraska. She lives with her two sons. She moved from San Francisco to Lakewood Ranch, Florida, and finally Las Vegas, where she has a garden.

== Publications ==
- ASIN 0804843341, Steamy Kitchen Cookbook
- ASIN 1607742705, Steamy Kitchen's Healthy Asian Favorites
- Microdosing Guide And Journal

Rae has appeared in the following publications:

- ASIN B00A6EPBP4, Recipe Rehab Cookbook
- ASIN 0470601795, Professional Blogging for Dummies
- ASIN B004P5NR74, Guerrilla Marketing
- ASIN B0067TGSOK, The $100 Startup
- ASIN B00BS03TSQ, Good Bite Weeknight Meals
