= Jade C. Bell =

Canadian actor

Jade C. Bell is a Canadian actor who appeared in the first season of the television show Dark Angel as Sebastian, a mute quadriplegic genius who communicates via a machine which verbalizes his thoughts. Bell is blind, mute and immobile in real life, due to an injection of a speedball, which deprived his brain of oxygen for 15 minutes in August 1997 at the age of 23. In 2010 he featured as the central character in the documentary film Harpooned Soul: The Jade Bell Story. The film was nominated for 'Best Film' and 'Best Director' (Dean Easterbrook) at the Documentary Edge Festival.

Bell tours schools, theatres and prisons, encouraging people to not take drugs. He has appeared before over 200,000 young people in Canada. Bell also writes music, and released the album War Stained Skin in 2014.
