= Dio discography =

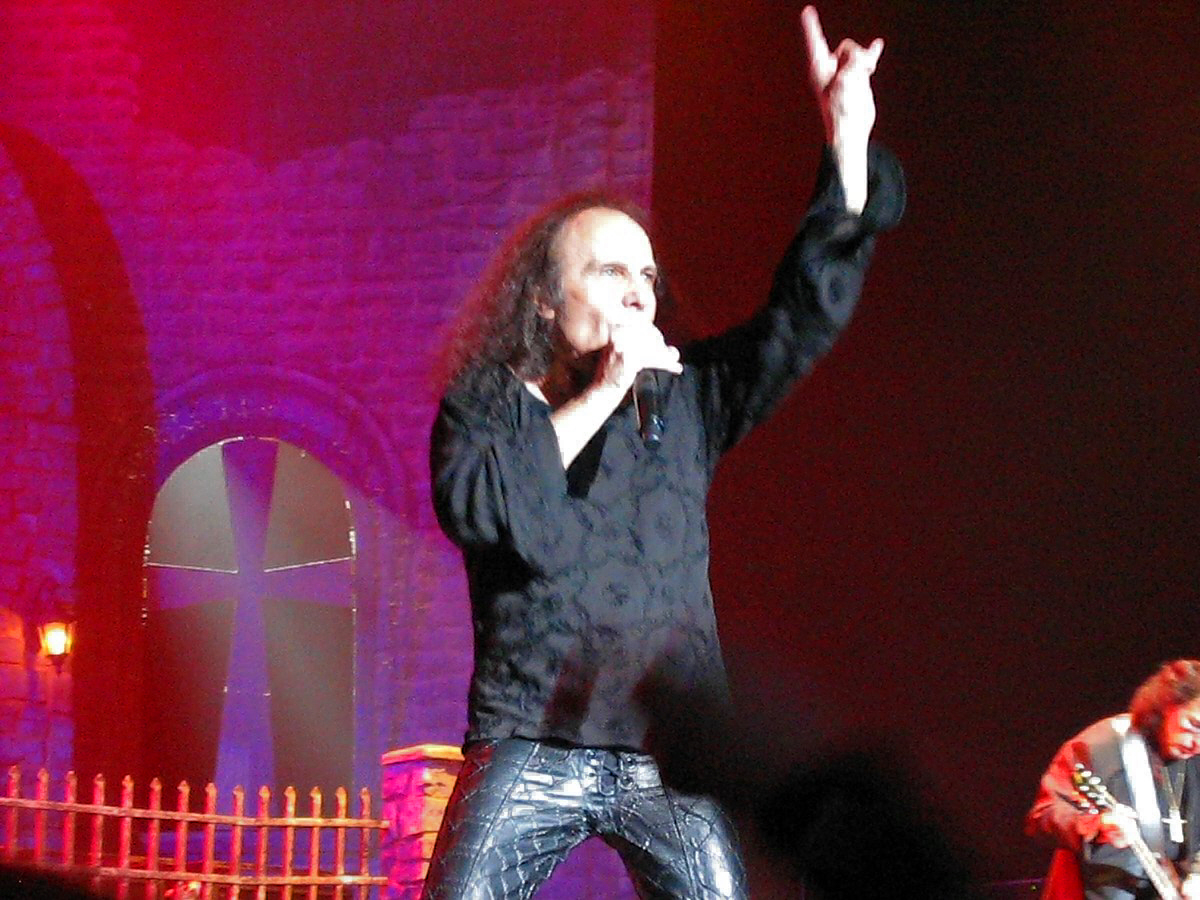
- Lead Singer Ronnie James Dio "throwing horns", a gesture commonly used by both artists and fans of heavy metal music
- Studio albums: 10
- Extended plays: 1
- Live albums: 7
- Compilation albums: 10
- Singles: 13
- Video albums: 9
- Music videos: 12

The following is a comprehensive discography of Dio, an American heavy metal band led by vocalist Ronnie James Dio. Dio was formed in 1982 after Ronnie James Dio and drummer Vinny Appice left Black Sabbath. The band went through frequent personnel changes. The final line-up consisted of Dio (vocals), Craig Goldy (guitars), Rudy Sarzo (bass), Simon Wright (drums) and Scott Warren (keyboards).

The band's debut album Holy Diver (1983) peaked at number 61 on the Billboard 200 and was certified platinum in the United States. The first single "Holy Diver" charted at 72 in the United Kingdom, followed by "Rainbow in the Dark" which reached 46. Their follow-up album The Last in Line (1984) charted higher, reaching number 24 in the US, and went platinum in the US. The single, "Last in Line", peaked at number 10 in the US and became the band's best performing single, while "Mystery" reached 20 and "We Rock" charted at 42 in the UK. Sacred Heart (1985) reached gold status in the US, and was the last Dio album to achieve any sales certifications. The single "Rock 'N' Roll Children" charted at 26 in the UK. In 1987, the band released Dream Evil. The single "I Could Have Been a Dreamer" was the band's last to chart in the US, reaching 33. For Lock up the Wolves, the band released their last chart single "Hey Angel", which reached 94 in the UK. In 2002, the band released Killing the Dragon. It reached 199, and was the last to chart in the US.

== Albums ==
=== Studio albums ===
Year	Album details	Peak chart positions											Sales	Certifications
Year	Album details	US	AUT	CAN	FIN	GER	JPN	NLD	NOR	SWE	SWI	UK	Sales	Certifications
1983	Holy Diver: Released: May 25, 1983; Label: Warner Bros. (9 23836–1); Format: CD, LP, CS	56	—	—	—	52	176	—	—	18	—	13		US: 2× Platinum; UK: Silver
1984	The Last in Line: Released: July 2, 1984; Label: Warner Bros./Vertigo (9 25100–1); Format: CD, LP, CS	23	—	51	—	23	154	11	7	6	—	4		US: Platinum; UK: Silver
1985	Sacred Heart: Released: August 12, 1985; Label: Warner Bros./Vertigo (824 848–1); Format: CD, LP, CS	29	13	35	—	12	164	15	8	6	14	4		US: Gold
1987	Dream Evil: Released: August 3, 1987; Label: Warner Bros. (1-25612); Format: CD, LP, CS	43	15	65	—	12	—	38	7	4	13	8	US (since 1991): 52,000	
1990	Lock Up the Wolves: Released: May 15, 1990; Label: Reprise (9 26212–2); Format: CD, LP, CS	61	—	—	—	16	70	76	—	23	25	28	US (since 1991): 46,000	
1993	Strange Highways: Released: October 25, 1993; Label: Reprise (9 45527–2); Format: CD, LP, CS	142	—	—	—	79	—	—	—	—	—	—	US: 74,000	
1996	Angry Machines: Released: October 15, 1996; Label: Mayhem (11104-2); Format: CD, CS, LP (2012)	—	—	—	—	44	—	—	—	—	—	—	US: 36,000	
2000	Magica: Released: March 21, 2000; Label: Spitfire (223165-205); Format: CD, LP (2008), CS	—	—	—	26	32	71	—	—	52	—	—	US: 47,000	
2002	Killing the Dragon: Released: May 21, 2002; Label: Spitfire (SPITCD199); Format: CD, LP (2009), CS	199	70	—	28	30	85	—	—	24	—	194	US: 40,000	
2004	Master of the Moon: Released: September 7, 2004; Label: Sanctuary (085-69912); Format: CD, LP	—	—	—	16	43	259	—	—	35	—	159		
"—" denotes albums that did not chart.

=== Live albums ===
Year	Album details	Peak chart positions					
Year	Album details	US	FIN	CAN	UK	GRE	GER
1986	Intermission: Released: June 2, 1986; Label: Warner Bros. (4-25443); Format: CD, LP, CS	70	—	85	22	—	63
1998	Inferno: Last in Live: Released: February 24, 1998; Label: Mayhem (11115); Format: CD	—	40	—	—	—	—
2003	Evil or Divine - Live in New York City: Released: February 22, 2003; Label: Spitfire (15253); Format: CD, LP	—	—	—	—	33	—
2006	Holy Diver - Live: Released: April 17, 2006; Label: Eagle (20088); Format: CD, LP	—	—	—	174	—	—
2010	Dio at Donington UK: Live 1983 & 1987: Released: November 9, 2010; Label: Niji Entertainment Group; Format: CD, LP	98	—	—	12	—	87
2013	Finding the Sacred Heart - Live in Philly 1986: Released: May 29, 2013; Label: Eagle; Format: CD, LP	—	—	—	—	—	48
2014	Live in London, Hammersmith Apollo 1993: Released: May 12, 2014; Label: Eagle; Format: CD, LP	—	—	—	—	—	60
"—" denotes albums that did not chart.

=== Compilation albums ===
Year	Album details	Certifications
1992	Diamonds – The Best of Dio: Released: June 1, 1992; Label: Vertigo (5122062); Format: CD, LP	
1997	Anthology: Released: 1997; Label: Connoisseur (245); Format: CD	
2000	The Very Beast of Dio: Released: October 2000; Label: Warner Bros./Rhino (79983); Format: CD	US: Gold
2001	Anthology: Volume Two: Released: February 2001; Label: Connoisseur (338); Format: CD	
2002	Evil Collection: The Very Best: Released: March 14, 2002; Label: Warner Bros. (5866602); Format: CD	
2003	Stand Up and Shout: The Dio Anthology: Released: May 2003; Label: Warner Bros./Rhino (73855); Format: CD	
2003	The Collection: Released: October 2003; Label: Universal/Spectrum (77043); Format: CD	UK: Silver
2005	Metal Hits: Released: October 4, 2005; Label: Rhino (73247); Format: CD	
2011	Mightier Than the Sword: Released: June 6, 2011; Label: Sanctuary; Format: CD	
2012	The Very Beast of Dio Vol. 2: Released: October 9, 2012; Label: Niji Entertainment; Format: CD	
2016	A Decade of Dio: 1983-1993: Released: July 22, 2016; Label: Rhino Entertainment; Format: CD	

== Extended play ==
Year	Album details
1986	The Dio E.P.: Released: May 9, 1986; Label: Vertigo (DIO 7); Format: LP

== Singles ==
Year	Single	Peak chart positions		Album
Year	Single	US Main	UK	Album
1983	"Holy Diver"	40	72	Holy Diver
1983	"Rainbow in the Dark"	14	46	Holy Diver
1984	"The Last in Line"	10		The Last in Line
1984	"We Rock"	—	42	The Last in Line
1984	"Mystery"	20	34	The Last in Line
1985	"Rock 'N' Roll Children"	26	26	Sacred Heart
1985	"Hungry for Heaven" (Note: "Hungry for Heaven" originally charted at No. 72 on the UK charts, but re-entered the charts in May 1986 as a re-issue and as A-side of "The Dio EP", this time reaching No. 56)	30	72	Sacred Heart
1986	"King of Rock and Roll"	—		Sacred Heart
1987	"I Could Have Been a Dreamer"	33	69	Dream Evil
1987	"All the Fools Sailed Away"	—		Dream Evil
1990	"Hey Angel"	—	94	Lock Up The Wolves
2010	"Electra"			non-album single
"—" denotes singles that did not chart.

== Videography ==
=== Video albums ===
Year	Video details	Certifications
1984	Live in Concert: Released: 1984; Label: Warner Music Video; Format: VHS & Laserdisc	
1984	A Special from the Spectrum: Released: 1984; Label: Warner Music Video; Format: VHS & Laserdisc	Gold
1986	Sacred Heart "The Video": Released: 1986; Label: Warner Music Video; Format: VHS	
1990	Time Machine: Released: July 1, 1990; Label: Warner/Polygram; Format: VHS	
2003	Evil or Divine - Live in New York City: Released: 2003; Label: Spitfire; Format: DVD	Gold
2005	We Rock: Released: 2005; Label: Warner Music Video; Format: DVD	
2006	Holy Diver - Live: Released: April 17, 2006; Label: Eagle; Format: DVD	
2013	Finding The Sacred Heart - Live In Philly 1986: Released: May 29, 2013; Label: Eagle; Format: DVD, BD	
2014	Live in London, Hammersmith Apollo 1993: Released: May 12, 2014; Label: Eagle; Format: DVD, BD	

=== Music videos ===
Year	Title	Album
1983	"Holy Diver"	Holy Diver
1983	"Rainbow in the Dark"	Holy Diver
1984	"The Last in Line"	The Last in Line
1984	"We Rock"	The Last in Line
1984	"Mystery"	The Last in Line
1985	"Rock 'n' Roll Children"	Sacred Heart
1985	"Hungry for Heaven"	Sacred Heart
1987	"I Could Have Been a Dreamer"	Dream Evil
1987	"All the Fools Sailed Away"	Dream Evil
1990	"Wild One"	Lock Up the Wolves
1990	"Hey Angel"	Lock Up the Wolves
2002	"Push" (with Tenacious D)	Killing the Dragon
