= Ronnie James Dio discography =

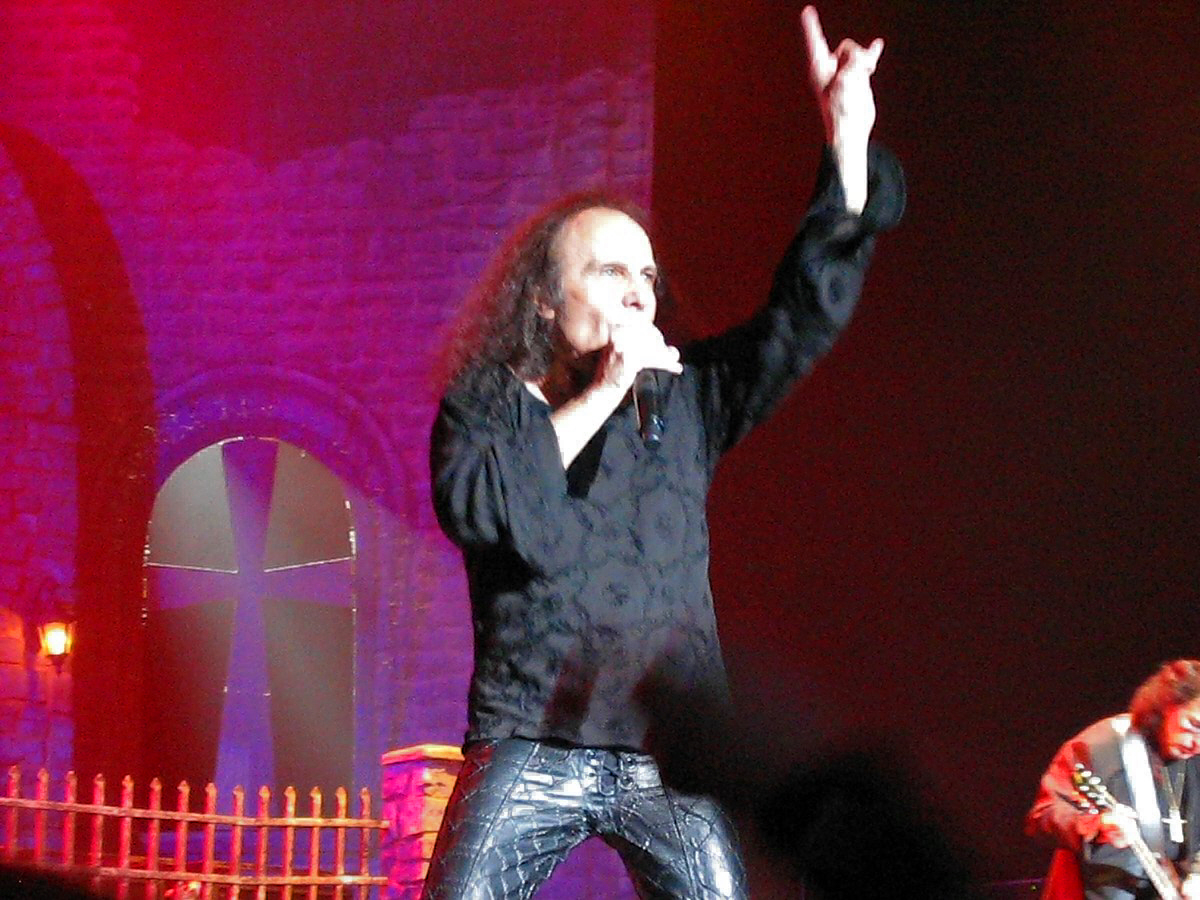
- Dio waving the "sign of the horns" at a Heaven and Hell concert, 2007
- Studio albums: 20
- Live albums: 23
- Compilation albums: 8
- Singles: 18

This is a list of Ronnie James Dio releases. Some of his early appearances on 45 rpm singles are collected on several volumes of the LP series The History of Syracuse Music, released in the 1980s. A complete discography with lyrics can be found here.

== Releases ==
=== Ronnie & The Red Caps ===
Year	A-Side	B-Side	Format	Label	Cat. No.	Country	Notes
1958	Conquest	Lover	7”	Reb	59-45-105	USA	Ronnie didn't sing lead vocals on either of these tracks
1960	An Angel Is Missing	What I'd Say	7”	Seneca	S 178-102	USA	Released as "Ronnie Dio and the Red Caps"

=== Ronnie Dio & The Prophets ===
==== Singles ====
Year	A-Side	B-Side	Format	Label	Cat. No.	Country	Notes	
1962	The Ooh-Poo-Pah-Doo	Love Pains	7”	Atlantic	2145	Canada, USA	-	
1962	Will You Still Love Me Tomorrow	Bad Man In Town	7”	Audiodisc/Swan				
1963	Gonna Make It Alone	Swingin’ Street	7”	Lawn	218	USA		-
1963	Mr. Misery	Our Year	7”	Swan	4165	USA	-	
1963	Che Tristezza Senza Te (Mr. Misery)	Our Year	7”	Derby	DB 5084	Italy	New Italian lyrics set to the music of "Mr. Misery" (not a translation of "Mr. Misery"), “Our Year” sung in English	
1964	Mr. Misery	Our Year	7”	Stateside	35-ESS.21	India	-	
1964	Love Potion No. 9	Love Potion No. 9	7”	Valex	001	USA	-	
1965	Say You're Mine Again	Where You Gonna Run To Girl	7”	Kapp	697	Canada, USA	-	
1965	Smiling By Day (Crying By Night)	Dear Darling (I Won't Be Comin' Home)	7”	Kapp	725	Canada, USA	-	
1965	Walking Alone	The Way Of Love	7”	Kapp	770	Canada, USA	-	
1967	Walking In Different Circles	10 Days With Brenda	7”	Parkway	P-143	USA	-	

==== Albums ====
Year	Title	Format	Label	Cat. No.	Country	Notes
1963	Dio at Domino's	LP	Jove	J-108	USA	Recorded live at Domino's Restaurant, Cortland, New York on February 24, 1963

=== The Electric Elves ===
Year	A-Side	B-Side	Format	Label	Cat. No.	Country	Notes
1967	Hey, Look Me Over	It Pays To Advertise	7”	MGM	K 13839	USA	-

=== The Elves ===
==== Singles ====
Year	A-Side	B-Side	Format	Label	Cat. No.	Country	Notes
1969	Walking in Different Circles	She's Not the Same	7”	Decca	732507	USA	-
1970	Amber Velvet	West Virginia	7”	MCA	MU 1114	Sweden, UK	-
1970	Amber Velvet	West Virginia	7”	Decca	732617	USA	-

==== Bootlegs ====
Year	Title	Format	Label	Cat. No.	Country	Notes
1971	Live at the Beacon	LP	-	-	USA	Bootleg

=== Elf ===
==== Studio albums ====
Year	Title	Format	Label	Notes
1972	Elf	LP, CS, CD	Epic	-
1974	Carolina County Ball	LP, CS, CD	Purple, Line, Safari, MGM	Known as L.A. 59 in USA
1975	Trying to Burn the Sun	LP, CS, CD	Safari, Interfusion	-

==== Compilations ====
Year	Title	Format	Label	Notes
1974	The History of Syracuse Music, Vol. VI	LP	ECEIP	Various Artists compilation, includes a live version of "Rockin' Chair Rock 'N' Roll Blues"
1978	The Gargantuan Elf Album	CD	Safari	Both Carolina County Ball and Trying to Burn the Sun albums on one CD, minus the song "Happy"
1989	20 Years of Syracuse Rock	CS	-	Various Artists compilation, includes a live version of "Hoochie Koochie Lady"
1994	The Elf Albums	CD	Connoisseur Collection, Festival	Both Carolina County Ball and Trying to Burn the Sun albums on one CD

==== Bootlegs ====
Year	Title	Format
1972	Live at the Bank	LP
1973	Live! And My Soul Shall Be Lifted	LP, CD

=== Rainbow ===
For more details, see Rainbow discography

==== Studio albums ====
Year	Title	Certifications
1975	Ritchie Blackmore's Rainbow	UK: Silver
1976	Rising	UK: Gold (Original Edition) UK: Silver (Deluxe Edition)
1978	Long Live Rock 'n' Roll	UK: Silver

==== Live albums ====
Year	Title	Certifications
1977	On Stage	UK: Silver
1986	Finyl Vinyl	
1990	Live in Germany 1976	
2006	Live In Munich 1977 (CD/DVD)	
2006	Deutschland Tournee 1976 (Box-set)	
2007	Live In Cologne 1976	
2007	Live In Düsseldorf 1976	
2007	Live In Nurnberg 1976	

=== Black Sabbath ===
For more details, see Black Sabbath discography.

==== Studio albums ====
Year	Title	Certifications	Notes
1980	Heaven and Hell	US: Platinum UK: Gold	
1981	Heavy Metal: Music from the Motion Picture		One track, an alternate take of "The Mob Rules"
1981	Mob Rules	US: Gold UK: Silver	
1992	Dehumanizer		
2007	Black Sabbath: The Dio Years		Compilation, Contains three new songs
2008	The Rules of Hell		A box set containing all the Dio era Black Sabbath albums

==== Live albums ====
Year	Title	Notes
1980	Black And Blue	VHS
1982	Live Evil	
2007	Live at Hammersmith Odeon	Limited release of 5,000

=== Dio ===
For more details, see Dio discography.

==== Studio albums ====
- Holy Diver (1983) US 2× Platinum UK Silver
- The Last in Line (1984) US Platinum UK Silver
- Sacred Heart (1985) US Gold
- Dream Evil (1987)
- Lock up the Wolves (1990)
- Strange Highways (1993)
- Angry Machines (1996)
- Magica (2000)
- Killing the Dragon (2002)
- Master of the Moon (2004)

==== Live albums ====
- Intermission (1986)
- Sacred Heart (DVD 1986)
- Inferno: Last in Live (1998)
- We Rock (DVD 2005)
- Evil or Divine – Live in New York City (2005)
- Holy Diver – Live (2006)
- Dio at Donington UK: Live 1983 & 1987 (2010)
- Finding the Sacred Heart – Live in Philly 1986 (2013)
- Live in London, Hammersmith Apollo 1993 (2014)

==== Compilations ====
- Diamonds – The Best of Dio (1992)
- The Very Beast of Dio (2000)
- The Very Beast of Dio Vol. 2 (2012)

=== Heaven & Hell ===
==== Studio albums ====
- The Devil You Know (2009)

==== Singles ====
- "The Devil Cried", "Shadow of the Wind", "Ear in the Wall" (2007)

==== Live albums ====
- Live from Radio City Music Hall (2007)
- Neon Nights: 30 Years of Heaven & Hell (2010)

=== Guest appearances ===
- Bobby Comstock & The Counts: "Your Big Brown Eyes" 7" Single (1960), "Run My Heart" 7" Single (1963)

Dio sings backing vocals and plays trumpet on "Your Big Brown Eyes", and sings backing vocals on "Run My Heart".

- The Angels: My Boyfriend's Back 7" Single (1963), My Boyfriend's Back (1963)

Dio plays trumpet on "My Boyfriend's Back".

- Austin Gravelding: Self Made Man (1970)

Dio wrote the song "Hello Teddy Bear" that appears on the B side of the LP.

- Roger Glover: The Butterfly Ball and the Grasshopper's Feast (1974)

Dio sings "Sitting in a Dream", "Love is All", and "Homeward". He also co-wrote the song "Harlequin Hare".

- David Coverdale: Northwinds (1978)

Dio sings backing vocals on "Give Me Kindness".

- Kerry Livgren: Seeds of Change (1980), The Best of Kerry Livgren (2002)

Dio sings "Mask of the Great Deceiver" and "To Live for the King".

- Heaven: Where Angels Fear to Tread (1983)

Dio sings backing vocals on "Where Angels Fear To Tread". The album sleeve lists him as "Evil Eyes".

- Rough Cutt: LA's Hottest Unsigned Rock Bands (1983), KLOS 95 1/2 Rock to Riches (1983), Rough Cutt (1985), Rough Cutt Live (1996), Anthology (2008)

Dio produced the songs "A Little Kindness" and "Used & Abused".

- Hellion: 12 Commandments in Metal (1985)

Dio produced the song "Run For Your Life".

- Hear 'n Aid: Hear 'n Aid (1986), "Stars" 7"/12" Single (1986), Hear 'n Aid: The Sessions (VHS video) (1986)

Dio was one of the organizers of the Hear 'n Aid project. His voice is featured in the single "Stars", while also contributing, alongside the rest of his band, with a live version of "Hungry For Heaven" included in the final record.

- Eddie Hardin & Guests: Wizard's Convention (1994)

Dio sings backing vocals on "Summer Days" and "Seems I'm Always Gonna Love You"

- Dog Eat Dog: Play Games (1996)

Dio vocals are featured on the song "Games".

- Munetaka Higuchi with Dream Castle: Free World (1997)

Dio sings "What Cost War".

- Pat Boone: In a Metal Mood: No More Mr. Nice Guy (1997)

Dio sings backing vocals on Pat Boone's cover of his signature song, "Holy Diver".

- Various Artists: Humanary Stew: A Tribute to Alice Cooper (1999)

Dio sings a cover of "Welcome to My Nightmare".

- Various Artists: Not the Same Old Song and Dance: A Tribute to Aerosmith (1999)

Dio sings a cover of "Dream On".

- Deep Purple: In Concert with The London Symphony Orchestra (1999), Live at the Rotterdam Ahoy (2001), The Soundboard Series (2001)

Dio toured with Deep Purple, and is featured in multiple albums singing songs such as "Sitting in a Dream", "Love is All", "Fever Dreams", "Smoke on the Water", and "Rainbow in the Dark".

- Eddie Ojeda: Axes 2 Axes (2005)

Dio sings "Tonight", the opening track of the album.

- Ian Gillan: Gillan's Inn (2006)

Dio sings backing vocals on "Day Late and a Dollar Short".

- Queensrÿche: Operation: Mindcrime II (2006), Mindcrime at the Moore (2007)

Dio sings "The Chase" in duet with Geoff Tate.

- Tenacious D: The Pick of Destiny (2006)

Dio sings "Kickapoo" alongside Jack Black and Meat Loaf.

- Various Artists with Steve Lukather, In Session (2008)

Dio sings a cover of "Welcome to My Nightmare".

- Various Artists: We Wish you a Metal Xmas and a Headbanging New Year (2008)

Dio sings "God Rest You Merry, Gentlemen"

- Girlschool: Legacy (2008)

Dio sings a mix version of "I Spy". His Black Sabbath/Heaven & Hell bandmate Tony Iommi plays guitar on the track.

- David "Rock" Feinstein: Bitten By the Beast (2010)

Dio sings "Metal Will Never Die". The track was subsequently included in The Very Beast of Dio Vol. 2 (2012).

- The Rods: Vengeance (2011)

Dio sings "The Code". This is the last song he ever recorded.

- Hellion: To Hellion and Back (2014)

Dio produced the songs "Run For Your Life" and "Get Ready" back in 1984.

=== Other media ===
- The Black Sabbath Story (Documentary, Vol. 2) (1992)
- Metal: A Headbangers Journey (Documentary) (2005)
- Heavy: The Story of Heavy Metal (Documentary) (2006)
- Tenacious D in the Pick of Destiny (Film) (2006)
- That Metal Show – Season 2, Episode 8: Heaven & Hell (2009)

== Studio albums timeline ==
Band	Album																			
Band	Elf (1972)	Carolina County Ball (1974)	Trying to Burn the Sun (1975)	Ritchie Blackmore's Rainbow (1975)	Rising (1976)	Long Live Rock 'n' Roll (1978)	Heaven and Hell (1980)	Mob Rules (1981)	Holy Diver (1983)	The Last in Line (1984)	Sacred Heart (1985)	Dream Evil (1987)	Lock Up the Wolves (1990)	Dehumanizer (1992)	Strange Highways (1993)	Angry Machines (1996)	Magica (2000)	Killing the Dragon (2002)	Master of the Moon (2004)	The Devil You Know (2009)
Band	Elf			Rainbow			Black Sabbath		Dio					Black Sabbath	Dio					Heaven & Hell
Role	Personnel																			
Vocals	Ronnie James Dio																			
Guitar	David Feinstein	Steve Edwards		Ritchie Blackmore			Tony Iommi		Vivian Campbell			Craig Goldy	Rowan Robertson	Tony Iommi	Tracy G		Craig Goldy	Doug Aldrich	Craig Goldy	Tony Iommi
Bass	Ronnie James Dio	Craig Gruber			Jimmy Bain	Ritchie Blackmore; Bob Daisley	Geezer Butler		Jimmy Bain				Teddy Cook	Geezer Butler	Jeff Pilson		Jimmy Bain		Jeff Pilson	Geezer Butler
Drums	Gary Driscoll				Cozy Powell		Bill Ward	Vinny Appice					Simon Wright	Vinny Appice			Simon Wright			Vinny Appice
Keyboards	Mickey Lee Soule				Tony Carey	David Stone	Geoff Nicholls		Jimmy Bain	Claude Schnell			Jens Johansson	Geoff Nicholls	Jeff Pilson		Craig Goldy; Ronnie James Dio	Jimmy Bain	Scott Warren	Mike Exeter
