= Metal Hits (Dio album) =

Greatest hits album by Dio
- Released: October 4, 2005
- Genre: Hard rock, metal
- Length: 48:41
- Label: Flashback Records, Warner Bros. Records
- Producer: Dean Schachtel

Dio chronology
| Evil or Divine – Live in New York City (2005) | Metal Hits (2005) | Holy Diver – Live (2006) |

Professional ratings
Review scores
| Source | Rating |
|---|---|
| Allmusic | 4/5 stars |

Metal Hits is a compilation album by the heavy metal band Dio and was released in 2005 by Rhino Flashback Records. Multi-instrumentalist and heavy-metal mainstay Ronnie James Dio built up a hefty back catalog over the decades, with a career that spans vocalizing for Rainbow, Black Sabbath, and of course, his own group, Dio. This best-of, which covers the Dio years exclusively, spans the period 1983's Holy Diver and 1990's Lock Up the Wolves, and is packed with the kind of high-octane performances Dio fans have come to treasure. Neo-Gothic masterpieces like "Sunset Superman" and "Dream Evil" share space with the metal mysticism of "Last in Line," while Dio's hell's-gate scream holds sway over all.

== Track listing ==
1. "Rainbow in the Dark" (Dio/Appice/Bain/Campbell) - 4:15
2. "Holy Diver" (Dio) - 5:52
3. "Night People" (Dio/Goldy/Bain/Schnell/Appice) - 4:08
4. "The Last in Line" (Dio/Bain/Campbell) - 5:46
5. "Evil Eyes" (Dio) - 3:40
6. "Sunset Superman" (Dio/Goldy/Bain/Schnell/Appice) - 5:47
7. "Dream Evil" (Dio/Goldy) - 4:24
8. "Hollywood Black" (Dio/G/Appice) - 5:11
9. "Wild One" (Dio/Robertson) - 4:07
10. "Evilution" (Dio/G/Pilson/Appice) - 5:36

== Personnel ==
=== Dio ===
- Ronnie James Dio: vocals (all tracks)
- Vivian Campbell: guitar (tracks 1,2,4–6)
- Jimmy Bain: bass (tracks 1–6)
- Vinny Appice: drums (tracks 1–6,8,10)
- Claude Schnell: keyboards (tracks 3–6)
- Craig Goldy: guitar (tacks 3,6)
- Simon Wright: drums (track 9)
- Rowan Robertson: guitar (track 9)
- Teddy Cook: bass (track 9)
- Jens Johansson: keyboards (track 9)
- Tracy G: guitar (tracks 8,10)
- Jeff Pilson: bass, keyboards (tracks 8,10)

=== Production ===
- NNP: Art Direction
- Dean Schachtel: Compilation Producer
