= Ronnie James Dio – This Is Your Life =

Studio album by various artists
- Released: March 25, 2014 (Japan); March 31, 2014
- Recorded: 1996–2014
- Genre: Heavy metal
- Length: 68:54
- Label: Rhino
- Producer: John Spiker, Adrenaline Mob, Corey Taylor, Howard Benson, Mike Plotnikoff, Cameron Webb, Martin Hanson, Mikael Nord Andersson, Rudy Kronenberger, Adam Dutkiewicz, Bob Kulick, Brett Chassen, Jeff Pilson, Wyn Davis, Greg Fidelman

Full gatefold

Professional ratings
Review scores
Source	Rating
AllMusic	4/5 stars
Sputnikmusic	3.5/5 stars
Blabbermouth.net	8.5/10 stars

Ronnie James Dio – This Is Your Life is a 2014 tribute album to Ronnie James Dio, lead singer of several heavy metal bands, including Elf, Rainbow, Black Sabbath, Heaven & Hell, and his own band Dio. The album features many of Dio's contemporaries performing songs originally recorded by Dio. Tenacious D won the Grammy Award for Best Metal Performance at the 57th Grammy Awards for their cover of "The Last in Line", and Anthrax were nominated in the same category for their cover of "Neon Knights".

Dio died in 2010 from stomach cancer. Album proceeds were targeted for Dio's Stand Up and Shout Cancer Fund.

== Track listing ==
No.	Title	Artist	Length
1.	"Neon Knights"	Anthrax	4:29
2.	"The Last in Line"	Tenacious D	3:44
3.	"The Mob Rules"	Adrenaline Mob	3:17
4.	"Rainbow in the Dark"	Corey Taylor, Roy Mayorga, Satchel, Christian Martucci, Jason Christopher	4:24
5.	"Straight Through the Heart"	Halestorm	3:58
6.	"Starstruck"	Motörhead with Biff Byford	4:06
7.	"The Temple of the King"	Scorpions	4:37
8.	"Egypt (The Chains Are On)"	Doro	6:10
9.	"Holy Diver"	Killswitch Engage	4:09
10.	"Catch the Rainbow"	Glenn Hughes, Simon Wright, Craig Goldy, Rudy Sarzo, Scott Warren	6:42
11.	"I"	Oni Logan, Jimmy Bain, Rowan Robertson, Brian Tichy	5:30
12.	"Man on the Silver Mountain"	Rob Halford, Vinny Appice, Doug Aldrich, Jeff Pilson, Scott Warren	5:18
13.	"Ronnie Rising Medley" – "A Light in the Black", "Tarot Woman", "Stargazer", "Kill the King"	Metallica	9:04
14.	"This Is Your Life"	Dio	3:26

Japanese edition bonus tracks
No.	Title	Artist	Length
15.	"Heaven & Hell"	Stryper	6:14
16.	"Stand Up and Shout"	Dio Disciples	3:40

Digital bonus track
No.	Title	Artist	Length
17.	"Buried Alive"	Jasta	5:00

== Charts ==
Chart (2014)	Peak position
Finnish Albums (Suomen virallinen lista)	25
Hungarian Albums (MAHASZ)	2
