= Holy Diver (disambiguation) =

Holy Diver may refer to:

- Holy Diver, the debut album of heavy metal band Dio, released in 1983
  - "Holy Diver" (song), the first single off the album
  - Holy Diver – Live, a 2005 live album
- Holy Diver (video game), a video game released in Japan in 1989
