= Diamonds – The Best of Dio =

Diamonds - The Best of Dio

Greatest hits album by Dio
- Released: June 1, 1992
- Recorded: 1983–1990
- Genre: Heavy metal
- Length: 61:16 (LP), 64:54 (CD)
- Label: Vertigo
- Producer: Ronnie James Dio, Tony Platt

Dio compilations chronology
Diamonds - The Best of Dio (1992)	Anthology (1999)

Professional ratings
Review scores
Source	Rating
Allmusic	4/5 stars
The Rolling Stone Album Guide	2/5 stars

Diamonds – The Best of Dio is a greatest hits collection from heavy metal band Dio. It was released internationally in 1992, but it was never released domestically in the US.

== Track listing ==
1. "Holy Diver" (Dio) – 5:54
2. "Rainbow in the Dark" (Dio, Appice, Bain, Campbell) – 4:16
3. "Don't Talk to Strangers" (Dio) – 4:53
4. "We Rock" (Dio) – 4:35
5. "The Last in Line" (Dio, Bain, Campbell) – 5:47
6. "Evil Eyes" (Dio) – 3:38 (not included on the LP version)
7. "Rock 'n' Roll Children" (Dio) – 4:32
8. "Sacred Heart" (Dio, Appice, Bain, Campbell) – 6:28
9. "Hungry for Heaven" (Dio, Bain) – 4:11
10. "Hide in the Rainbow" (Dio, Bain) – 4:06
11. "Dream Evil" (Dio, Goldie) – 4:29
12. "Wild One" (Dio, Robertson) – 4:03
13. "Lock Up the Wolves" (Dio, Robertson, Bain) – 8:34

"Evil Eyes" is the version re-recorded for The Last in Line LP, rather than the original recording, which was the B-side to the "Holy Diver" single.

"Hide in the Rainbow", from The Dio E.P. (EP), had not been released on an album before.

The 1992 Vertigo label (UK) has track 8 listed as "Sacred Children" instead of "Sacred Heart" on the back cover of some releases (bar code 7 31451 22062 3). However, the correct title remains on the disk and in the album booklet.

== Personnel ==
- Ronnie James Dio - vocals, keyboards, producer
- Vivian Campbell - guitars (1–9)
- Craig Goldy - guitars (10,11)
- Rowan Robertson - guitars (12,13)
- Jimmy Bain - bass (1–11)
- Teddy Cook - bass (12,13)
- Vinny Appice - drums (1–11)
- Simon Wright - drums (12,13)
- Claude Schnell - keyboards (4–11)
- Jens Johansson - keyboards (12,13)

== Charts ==
=== Weekly charts ===
Chart (2024)	Peak position
Greek Albums (IFPI)	66
