= Sacred Heart "The Video" =

Video by Dio
- Released: 1986
- Recorded: June 17, 1986
- Venue: The Spectrum, Philadelphia
- Genre: Heavy metal
- Length: 58 min.
- Label: Warner
- Director: Bob Angelo
- Producer: Wendy Dio, Susan Silverman, Alan Superstein, Dave Douglas, Ronnie James Dio (audio)

Dio chronology
A Special from the Spectrum (1984)	Sacred Heart "The Video" (1986)	Time Machine (1990)

Professional ratings
Review scores
Source	Rating
Allmusic	2.5/5 stars

Sacred Heart "The Video" is the third video album by the American heavy metal band Dio, containing footage of a live concert performance recorded at The Spectrum arena in Philadelphia on June 17, 1986. The concert was filmed during the tour supporting the album Sacred Heart, and the live performance involved complex mechanical devices and laser effects, which cost an estimated US$250,000 to build and transport.

The video was only released on VHS, Beta and VHD (Japan only). When it was re-released in DVD format in 2004, it was retitled Sacred Heart "The DVD". The DVD also added an interview with singer Ronnie James Dio and guitarist Craig Goldy. A complete, remastered performance of the show was released as a Blu-ray/DVD/CD/Vinyl by Eagle Vision in 2013, titled Finding the Sacred Heart -Live In Philly, along with extra videos and interviews.

== Track listing ==
1. "Intro (Draco Ignis)"
2. "King of Rock and Roll"
3. "Time to Burn"
4. "The Last in Line"
5. "Holy Diver"
6. "The Last in Line (Reprise)"
7. "Heaven and Hell"
8. "Sacred Heart"
9. "Rock 'n' Roll Children"
10. "Long Live Rock 'n' Roll"
11. "Man on the Silver Mountain"
12. "Rock 'n' Roll Children (Reprise)"
13. "Rainbow in the Dark"
14. "Hungry for Heaven"

== Personnel ==
- Ronnie James Dio – vocals
- Craig Goldy – guitar
- Jimmy Bain – bass
- Vinny Appice – drums
- Claude Schnell – keyboards
