= Evil or Divine – Live in New York City =

Live album by Dio

Evil or Divine - Live in New York City

Video by Dio
- Released: 1 July 2003
- Recorded: December 13, 2002
- Venue: Roseland Ballroom (New York City)
- Genre: Heavy metal
- Length: 100 min.
- Label: Eagle Vision

Dio chronology
Time Machine (1990)	Evil or Divine - Live in New York City (2003)	We Rock (2005)

Evil or Divine - Live in New York City

Live album by Dio
- Released: 22 February 2005
- Recorded: December 13, 2002
- Venue: Roseland Ballroom (New York City)
- Genre: Heavy metal
- Length: 79:17
- Label: Spitfire
- Producer: Ronnie James Dio

Dio chronology
Master of the Moon (2004)	Evil or Divine - Live in New York City (2005)	Holy Diver - Live (2006)

Professional ratings
Review scores
Source	Rating
Allmusic	(DVD)
Allmusic	3/5 stars

Evil or Divine – Live in New York City is a video album by the American heavy metal band Dio, recorded in New York City in 2002 and released on DVD in 2003. It was also released on CD as a live album in 2005.

== DVD track listing ==
All lyrics are written by Ronnie James Dio, music as stated.

No.	Title	Music	Length
1.	"Killing the Dragon"	Jimmy Bain, Dio	5:25
2.	"Egypt (The Chains Are On)"/"Children of the Sea" (Black Sabbath song)	Vinny Appice, Bain, Vivian Campbell, Dio/Geezer Butler, Dio, Tony Iommi, Bill Ward	9:45
3.	"Push"	Bain, Dio, Craig Goldy	4:17
4.	"Drum Solo"		4:38
5.	"Stand Up and Shout"	Bain, Dio	3:52
6.	"Rock and Roll"	Bain, Dio, Goldy	5:57
7.	"Don't Talk to Strangers"	Dio	6:40
8.	"Man on the Silver Mountain" (Rainbow song)	Ritchie Blackmore, Dio	3:06
9.	"Guitar Solo"	Doug Aldrich	8:35
10.	"Long Live Rock and Roll" (Rainbow song)	Blackmore, Dio	5:00
11.	"Lord of the Last Day"	Dio	4:25
12.	"Fever Dreams"	Dio	4:40
13.	"Holy Diver"	Dio	5:25
14.	"Heaven and Hell" (Black Sabbath song)	Butler, Dio, Iommi, Ward	7:12
15.	"The Last in Line"	Bain, Campbell, Dio	8:41
16.	"Rainbow in the Dark"	Appice, Bain, Campbell, Dio	6:00
17.	"We Rock"	Dio	5:35

Bonus material:

- Interview
- Photo Gallery
- Behind the Scenes Footage
- Video for "Push"

=== Certifications ===
Region	Certification	Certified units/sales
United States (RIAA)	Gold	50,000^{^}
^{^} Shipments figures based on certification alone.

== CD track listing ==
No.	Title	Length
1.	"Killing the Dragon"	5:06
2.	"Egypt (The Chains Are On)"/"Children of the Sea"	7:56
3.	"Push"	3:53
4.	"Stand Up and Shout"	3:36
5.	"Rock and Roll"	5:12
6.	"Don't Talk to Strangers"	5:49
7.	"Man on the Silver Mountain"	2:24
8.	"Guitar Solo"	9:07
9.	"Long Live Rock and Roll"	4:15
10.	"Fever Dreams"	4:09
11.	"Holy Diver"	5:07
12.	"Heaven and Hell"	6:38
13.	"The Last in Line"	5:44
14.	"Rainbow in the Dark"	5:05
15.	"We Rock"	5:16

=== Charts ===
Chart (2021)	Peak position
German Albums (Offizielle Top 100)	27

== Band ==
- Ronnie James Dio - vocals
- Doug Aldrich - guitar
- Jimmy Bain - bass
- Simon Wright - drums
- Scott Warren - keyboards
