= Time Machine (video) =

Video by Dio
- Released: 24 July 1990
- Genre: Heavy metal
- Length: 43 min.
- Label: Reprise/Warner (North America); PolyGram (rest of the world)
- Producer: Wendy Dio

Dio chronology
Sacred Heart "The Video" (1986)	Time Machine (1990)	Evil or Divine – Live in New York City (2005)

Time Machine is a VHS-only video compilation by the American heavy metal band Dio. Ronnie James Dio made extra narration to every song in this video. It is not comprehensive, missing the music videos for "Mystery," "I Could Have Been a Dreamer," and "We Rock" (all of which had been released before the collection's release date of July 24, 1990) or "Hey Angel" (the second music video from Lock Up the Wolves, which was not released until September, 1990.

== Reception ==
Professional ratings
Review scores
Source	Rating
Allmusic	2/5 stars

"If you're a Dio Fan, you'll enjoy the videos as it's definitely a good span of the band's music through the years," wrote Matt Beaman in the Black Sabbath fanzine Southern Cross. "If you're not, then you'll probably end up moaning about 'that bloody dragon'!"

== Tracks ==
1. "Wild One" (Ronnie James Dio, Rowan Robertson)
2. "Holy Diver" (Dio)
3. "Rainbow in the Dark" (Vinny Appice, Jimmy Bain, Vivian Campbell, Dio)
4. "The Last in Line" (Bain, Campbell, Dio)
5. "Hungry for Heaven" (Bain, Dio)
6. "Rock 'n' Roll Children" (Dio)
7. "Stand Up and Shout" (Bain, Dio)
8. "King of Rock and Roll" (Appice, Bain, Campbell, Dio)
9. "All the Fools Sailed Away" (Dio, Craig Goldy)
