= Live in London, Hammersmith Apollo 1993 =

Video by Dio
- Released: May 12, 2014
- Recorded: December 12, 1993
- Venue: Hammersmith Apollo (London, England)
- Genre: Heavy metal
- Label: Eagle Rock Entertainment

Live in London, Hammersmith Apollo 1993 is a concert film by the then newly reformed Dio band on the last night of their European tour in support of the Strange Highways album. The concert was recorded at Hammersmith Apollo in London, England on December 12, 1993. The film was released on CD, DVD and Blu-ray in 2014 by Eagle Rock Entertainment.

The band's performers included Ronnie James Dio (vocals), Vinny Appice (drums), Jeff Pilson (bass) and Tracy G (guitar). In addition to tracks from the "Strange Highways" album, the concert featured other Dio classic songs and some from Ronnie's career with Black Sabbath and Rainbow.

== Track List ==
Recorded on December 12, 1993 at the Hammersmith Apollo in London, England
| No. | Title | Length |
|---|---|---|
| 1. | "Stand Up and Shout" | 4:21 |
| 2. | "Strange Highways" | 6:12 |
| 3. | "Don't Talk To Strangers" | 5:52 |
| 4. | "Evilution" | 6:46 |
| 5. | "Pain/Guitar solo" | 9:37 |
| 6. | "The Mob Rules" | 3:36 |
| 7. | "Children of the Sea" | 2:44 |
| 8. | "Holy Diver" | 4:27 |
| 9. | "Heaven and Hell" | 4:21 |
| 10. | "Man on the Silver Mountain" | 3:49 |
| 11. | "Drum Solo" | 5:53 |
| 12. | "Heaven and Hell" | 1:41 |
| 13. | "Jesus Mary & The Holy Ghost" | 4:15 |
| 14. | "Hollywood Black" | 5:24 |
| 15. | "The Last in Line" | 6:50 |
| 16. | "Rainbow in the Dark" | 5:02 |
| 17. | "We Rock" | 5:17 |
| 18. | "Here's To You" | 5:08 |

== Charts ==
| Chart (2014) | Peak position |
|---|---|
| Belgian Albums (Ultratop Wallonia) | 136 |
| German Albums (Offizielle Top 100) | 60 |
| UK Rock & Metal Albums (OCC) | 18 |
