= We Rock (video) =

Video by Dio
- Released: 3 October 2005
- Recorded: Muziekcentrum Vredenburg, Utrecht, Netherlands, 4 December 1983; The Spectrum, Philadelphia, 25 August 1984
- Genre: Heavy metal
- Length: 100 min.
- Label: Universal

Dio chronology
Evil or Divine - Live in New York City (2003)	We Rock (2005)	Holy Diver – Live (2006)

We Rock is a compilation video album by the American heavy metal band Dio. It collects the out-of-print videos Live in Concert (1984) and A Special from the Spectrum (1984), which had been available on VHS and a Japanese issued Laserdisc, minus a couple of songs.

== Track listing ==
December 4, 1983:

1. "Stand Up and Shout" (Jimmy Bain, Ronnie James Dio)
2. "Straight Through the Heart" (Bain, Dio)
3. "Shame on the Night" (Vinny Appice, Bain, Vivian Campbell, Dio)
4. "Children of the Sea" (Geezer Butler, Dio, Tony Iommi, Bill Ward)
5. "Holy Diver" (Dio)
6. "Rainbow in the Dark" (Appice, Bain, Campbell, Dio)
7. "Don't Talk to Strangers" (Dio)

August 25, 1984:

1. "Don't Talk to Strangers" (Dio)
2. "Mystery" (Bain, Dio)
3. "Egypt (The Chains Are On)" (Appice, Bain, Campbell, Dio)
4. Drum Solo
5. "Heaven and Hell" (Butler, Dio, Iommi, Ward)
6. Guitar Solo by Vivian Campbell
7. "Heaven and Hell" (continued)
8. "The Last in Line" (Bain, Campbell, Dio)
9. "Heaven and Hell" (Reprise)
10. "Rainbow in the Dark" (Appice, Bain, Campbell, Dio)
11. "The Mob Rules" (Butler, Dio, Iommi)
12. "We Rock" (Dio)
- Bonus: Interview with Ronnie James Dio in Belgium, August 2005

== Band ==
- Ronnie James Dio - Vocals
- Vivian Campbell - Guitar
- Jimmy Bain - Bass
- Vinny Appice - Drums
- Claude Schnell - Keyboards
