= At Donington UK: Live 1983 & 1987 =

Live album by Dio
- Released: November 9, 2010
- Recorded: August 20, 1983 & August 22, 1987
- Venue: Monsters Of Rock (Donington Park)
- Genre: Heavy metal
- Length: 106:46
- Label: Niji Entertainment Group
- Producer: Ronnie James Dio

Dio chronology
| Holy Diver - Live (2006) | At Donington UK: Live 1983 & 1987 (2010) | Finding the Sacred Heart: Live in Philly 1986 (2013) |

Ronnie James Dio chronology
| The Devil You Know (2009) | Dio at Donington UK: Live 1983 & 1987 (2010) | Finding the Sacred Heart: Live in Philly 1986 (2013) |

At Donington UK: Live 1983 & 1987 is a live album from American heavy metal band Dio. It was released on November 9, 2010 as the first release from Dio's Niji Entertainment Group label. It features two appearances by Dio at the Monsters of Rock festival at Donington: the 1983 show and the 1987 show (from the Holy Diver and Dream Evil tours, respectively). In addition to his work with his own band, material from Ronnie James Dio's time in Black Sabbath and Rainbow is also showcased. Much of the material on these two discs is included as bonus tracks on the deluxe expanded editions of Holy Diver and Dream Evil, released in 2012 and 2013 respectively.

== Reception ==
Professional ratings
Review scores
| Source | Rating |
|---|---|
| Allmusic | 3.5/5 stars |
| BBC Music | Positive |
| Blabbermouth.net | 8/10 |
| Record Collector | 4/5 stars |

Blabbermouth.net reviewed the album, giving it a score of 8/10 and saying that the album "...is a terrific performance document from DIO's performances at the Monsters of Rock festivals. Nothing shabby or thrown-together here, the two-disc set exudes all the power and glory of a larger-than-life (figuratively speaking) heavy metal icon at the top of his game...".

Greg Moffitt at BBC music gave the album a positive review calling it a "great souvenir of Dio’s halcyon days and a fitting tribute to a true legend."

== Track listing ==
Disc one - 1983
| No. | Title | Writer(s) | Length |
|---|---|---|---|
| 1. | "Stand Up and Shout" | Jimmy Bain, Ronnie James Dio | 3:49 |
| 2. | "Straight Through the Heart" | Bain, Dio | 4:49 |
| 3. | "Children of the Sea" | Geezer Butler, Dio, Tony Iommi, Bill Ward | 6:15 |
| 4. | "Rainbow in the Dark" | Vinny Appice, Bain, Vivian Campbell, Dio | 4:48 |
| 5. | "Holy Diver" | Dio | 5:08 |
| 6. | "Drum Solo" | Appice | 0:41 |
| 7. | "Stargazer" | Ritchie Blackmore, Dio | 1:42 |
| 8. | "Guitar Solo" | Campbell | 1:38 |
| 9. | "Heaven and Hell" (long live version) | Butler, Dio, Iommi, Ward | 11:05 |
| 10. | "Man on the Silver Mountain" | Blackmore, Dio | 3:32 |
| 11. | "Starstruck" | Blackmore, Dio | 0:46 |
| 12. | "Man on the Silver Mountain (Reprise)" | Blackmore, Dio | 2:29 |

Disc two - 1987
| No. | Title | Writer(s) | Length |
|---|---|---|---|
| 1. | "Dream Evil" | Dio, Craig Goldy | 4:56 |
| 2. | "Neon Knights" | Butler, Dio, Iommi, Ward | 4:43 |
| 3. | "Naked in the Rain" | Dio | 7:28 |
| 4. | "Rock 'n' Roll Children" | Dio | 2:46 |
| 5. | "Long Live Rock 'n' Roll" | Blackmore, Dio | 4:39 |
| 6. | "The Last in Line" | Bain, Campbell, Dio | 4:12 |
| 7. | "Children of the Sea" | Butler, Dio, Iommi, Ward | 1:22 |
| 8. | "Holy Diver" | Dio | 1:27 |
| 9. | "Heaven and Hell" | Butler, Dio, Iommi, Ward | 3:18 |
| 10. | "Man on the Silver Mountain" | Blackmore, Dio | 4:28 |
| 11. | "All the Fools Sailed Away" | Dio, Goldy | 4:23 |
| 12. | "The Last in Line (Reprise)" | Bain, Campbell, Dio | 1:11 |
| 13. | "Rainbow in the Dark" | Appice, Bain, Campbell, Dio | 5:11 |

== Personnel ==
- Ronnie James Dio - vocals
- Vivian Campbell - guitar (on disc 1)
- Craig Goldy - guitar (on disc 2)
- Claude Schnell - keyboards
- Jimmy Bain - bass
- Vinny Appice - drums

== Charts ==
| Chart (2010) | Peak position |
|---|---|
| Austrian Albums (Ö3 Austria) | 73 |
| Belgian Albums (Ultratop Wallonia) | 82 |
| German Albums (Offizielle Top 100) | 87 |
| UK Independent Albums (Official Charts) | 18 |
| UK Rock & Metal Albums (Official Charts) | 12 |
| US Billboard 200 | 98 |
| US Independent Albums (Billboard) | 9 |
| US Top Hard Rock Albums (Billboard) | 6 |
| US Top Rock Albums (Billboard) | 18 |
| US Indie Store Album Sales (Billboard) | 17 |
