= Live at Donington =

Live at Donington may refer to:

- Donnington: The Live Tracks, an unsanctioned 1980 live album by Saxon recorded at Monsters of Rock, released 1995 and re-released 2000 as Live at Donnington 1980
- At Donington UK: Live 1983 & 1987, a live album by Dio recorded in 1983 and 1987 at Monsters of Rock and released in 2010
- Live at Donington: Monsters of Rock 1990, a live album by Thunder (band) recorded in 1990 at Monsters of Rock
- Live at Donington 1990, a live album and DVD by Whitesnake, recorded in 1990 at Monsters of Rock and released in 2011
- Live at Donington (AC/DC album), a live video release of the 1991 show at Monsters of Rock released in 1992 on VHS, 2003 on DVD and 2007 on Blu-ray
- Live at Donington (Iron Maiden album), a live album and video recorded in 1992 at Monsters of Rock, released in 1993 and reissued in 1998
