= A Special from the Spectrum =

Video by Dio
- Released: 1984
- Recorded: 25 August 1984
- Venue: The Spectrum (Philadelphia, PA)
- Genre: Heavy metal
- Length: 51 Minutes
- Label: Warner (North America); Castle Communications (UK)
- Director: Phil Tuckett
- Producer: Steve Sabol, Ed Sabol

Dio chronology
Live in Concert (1984)	A Special from the Spectrum (1984)	Sacred Heart "The Video" (1986)

Professional ratings
Review scores
Source	Rating
Allmusic	3.5/5 stars

A Special from the Spectrum is the second video album by the American heavy metal band Dio, containing footage of a live concert performance recorded at The Spectrum arena in Philadelphia on 25 August 1984. Most of the performance has been repackaged on the We Rock DVD, minus the opening track of "Stand Up and Shout". The video has been certified Gold by the RIAA having sold 50,000 units.

== Track listing ==
1. "Stand Up and Shout" (Jimmy Bain, Ronnie James Dio)
2. "Don't Talk to Strangers" (Dio)
3. "Mystery" (Bain, Dio)
4. "Egypt (The Chains Are On)" (Vinny Appice, Bain, Vivian Campbell, Dio)
5. "Heaven and Hell" (Geezer Butler, Dio, Tony Iommi, Bill Ward)
6. Guitar solo by Vivian Campbell
7. "Heaven and Hell" (continued)
8. "The Last in Line" (Bain, Campbell, Dio)
9. "Rainbow in the Dark" (Appice, Bain, Campbell, Dio)
10. "The Mob Rules" (Butler, Dio, Iommi)
11. "We Rock" (Dio)

== Band ==
- Ronnie James Dio – Vocals
- Vivian Campbell – Guitar
- Jimmy Bain – Bass
- Vinny Appice – Drums
- Claude Schnell – Keyboards

== Certifications ==
Region	Certification	Certified units/sales
United States (RIAA)	Gold	50,000^{^}
^{^} Shipments figures based on certification alone.
