= Metal Hits =

Metal Hits may refer to:

- Metal Hits (Ratt album), 2003 compilation album
- Metal Hits (Dio album), 2005 compilation album
