= Spectrum (arena) =

Former indoor arena in Philadelphia, Pennsylvania

The Spectrum
- America's Showplace

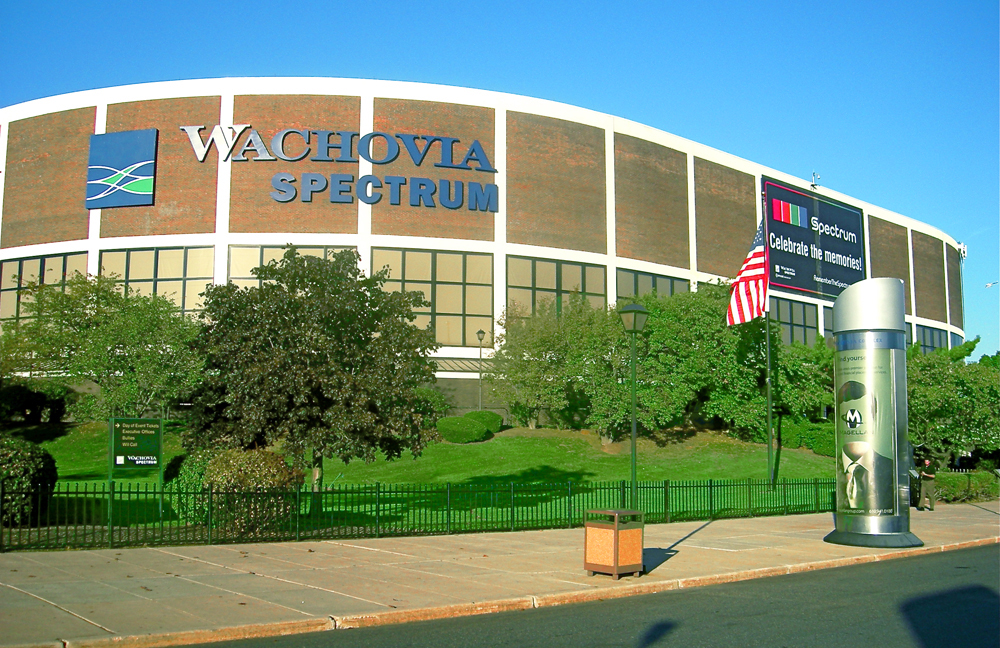
- The Spectrum, then named the Wachovia Spectrum, in 2008
- Interactive map of The Spectrum
- Former names: Spectrum (1967–1994); CoreStates Spectrum (1994–1998); First Union Spectrum (1998–2003); Wachovia Spectrum (2003–2009)
- Address: 3601 South Broad Street, Philadelphia, Pennsylvania, U.S.
- Location: South Philadelphia, Philadelphia, Pennsylvania, U.S.
- Coordinates: 39°54′15″N 75°10′16″W
- Owner: Comcast Spectacor, L.P.
- Operator: Global Spectrum
- Capacity: Concerts: *End stage: 18,369; *Center stage: 19,456; *Theater: 5,000–8,000; Basketball: 18,168; Ice Hockey: 17,380
- Surface: Multi-surface

Construction
- Groundbreaking: June 1, 1966
- Opened: September 30, 1967
- Renovated: 1986
- Closed: October 31, 2009
- Demolished: November 23, 2010 – May 2011
- Architect: Skidmore, Owings & Merrill
- General contractor: McCloskey & Company, Inc.

Tenants
- Philadelphia Flyers (NHL) (1967–1996); Philadelphia 76ers (NBA) (1967–1996); Philadelphia Freedoms (WTT) (1974); Philadelphia Wings (NLL) (1974–1975); Philadelphia Fever (MISL) (1978–1981); Philadelphia Wings (NLL) (1987–1996); Philadelphia Bulldogs (RHI) (1994–1996); Philadelphia Phantoms (AHL) (1996–2004, 2005–2009); Philadelphia KiXX (NPSL/MISL/NISL) (1996–2009); La Salle Explorers (NCAA) (1996–1998)

The Spectrum (later known as CoreStates Spectrum, First Union Spectrum and Wachovia Spectrum) was an indoor arena in Philadelphia, Pennsylvania. The arena opened in September 1967 as part of what is now known as the South Philadelphia Sports Complex. After several expansions of its seating capacity, it accommodated 18,168 for basketball and 17,380 for ice hockey, arena football, indoor soccer, and box lacrosse. It was the home arena for the Philadelphia Flyers and the Philadelphia 76ers from 1967 to 1996 before both moved to what is now the Xfinity Mobile Arena (known as "Spectrum II" during planning and construction). The Spectrum continued to be used for concerts and as the home for other sports teams including a new AHL affiliate for the Flyers, the Philadelphia Phantoms.

The final event at the Spectrum was a Pearl Jam concert on October 31, 2009. The arena was demolished between November 2010 and May 2011.

== History ==
Opened as the Spectrum in September 1967, Philadelphia's first modern indoor sports arena was built to be the home of the expansion Philadelphia Flyers of the NHL, and also to accommodate the existing Philadelphia 76ers of the NBA. The building was the second major sports facility built at the south end of Broad Street in an area previously known as East League Island Park and now referred to simply as the South Philadelphia Sports Complex.

=== Early years ===
Ground was broken on the arena on June 1, 1966, by Jerry Wolman and then-Philadelphia Mayor James Tate as the home of the NHL's expansion Philadelphia Flyers. The first event at the arena was the Quaker City Jazz Festival on September 30, 1967, produced by Larry Magid.

The first sporting event at the arena was an October 17, 1967 boxing match featuring Joe Frazier vs. Tony Doyle. From 1967 through 1972, fifteen fight cards were held at the Spectrum. The NBA's 76ers also moved there from Convention Hall as a second major league sports tenant. Lou Scheinfeld, former President of the Spectrum, explained that the name "Spectrum" was selected to evoke the broad range of events to be held there: "The 'SP' for 'sports' and 'South Philadelphia', 'E' for 'entertainment', 'C' for 'circuses', 'T' for 'theatricals', 'R' for 'recreation', and 'UM' as 'um, what a nice building!'" Scheinfeld also said that a seat in the city's first superbox initially cost $1,000 a year: "For every Flyers game, Sixers game, circus, you name it, you got 250 events for $1,000." The Flyers won their first ever home game in this arena by defeating the Pittsburgh Penguins, 1–0. Bill Sutherland scored the arena's first goal.

On March 1, 1968, wind blew part of the covering off the Spectrum's roof during a performance of the Ice Capades, forcing the building to close for a month while Mayor Tate fought with then-Philadelphia County District Attorney Arlen Specter over responsibility for the construction of the roof, and the damage was repaired. The 76ers moved their home games to Convention Hall and to the Palestra, but neither of those arenas had ice rinks at the time, and there were no other NHL-quality sites in the Philadelphia area. The Flyers hurriedly moved their next home game against the Oakland Seals to Madison Square Garden in New York followed by a meeting with the Boston Bruins played at Maple Leaf Gardens in Toronto before establishing a base at Le Colisée in Quebec City, home of their top minor league team, the AHL Quebec Aces, for the remainder of their regular season, marking the first NHL games in Quebec City in over four decades, and years before the Quebec Nordiques joined the NHL. The roof was repaired in time to permit the Flyers to return to the Spectrum to open their first Stanley Cup playoffs against the St. Louis Blues on April 4, 1968; the opening faceoff came just as the assassination of Martin Luther King Jr. was transpiring in Memphis, Tennessee. Similarly, in 1993, the Flyers played a day game against the Los Angeles Kings during a blizzard. A piece of flying debris smashed out one of the concourse windows, cancelling the game just after the first period.

In the 1970s, the venue's location near Broad Street and the reputation for fisticuffs that the Flyers had developed led to the nickname "Broad Street Bullies".

In 1976, the local pay television service PRISM (so-named in part as you could see "the spectrum" via a prism) was launched by Spectacor, carrying home games of the Flyers and 76ers (as well as the Phillies); PRISM's technical and studio operations were based out of the event level of the Spectrum (though PRISM's administrative offices were instead located in Bala Cynwyd). PRISM's successor, NBC Sports Philadelphia, is based out of the present-day Xfinity Mobile Arena in a similar arrangement.

A plaque inside The Spectrum stated that it held the world record for the fastest conversion from Hockey to Basketball.

The Spectrum, along with the Met Center and The Forum, was one of the first sports arenas to have a scoreboard with a messageboard. Furthermore, the messageboards on the Spectrum scoreboard were the first dot matrix screens in pro hockey or basketball, capable of photos, animation, and replays as well as messages. This was replaced in 1986 with ArenaVision, which consisted of six 9-by-12-foot (2.7 by 3.7 m) rear-projection videoscreens at the top and a four-sided American Sign and Indicator scoreboard at the bottom. Inside the videoscreens were General Electric projectors located 15 feet (4.6 m) away from each screen.

=== Seating capacity ===
Basketball
Years	Capacity
1967–1971	15,244
1971–1972	15,304
1972–1973	17,300
1973–1981	18,276
1981–1982	18,364
1982–1985	17,921
1985–1987	17,941
1987–2009	18,168

Ice Hockey
Years	Capacity
1967–1968	14,646
1968–1969	14,558
1969–1970	14,606
1970–1971	14,620
1971–1972	14,626
1972–1973	16,600
1973–1975	17,007
1975–1981	17,077
1981–1983	17,147
1983–1985	17,191
1985–1986	17,211
1986–1987	17,222
1987–1990	17,423
1990–1991	17,382
1991–2009	17,380

=== Flyers and 76ers' championships and All-Star Games hosted ===
The Spectrum's ice rink

The Flyers won their first Stanley Cup at the Spectrum on May 19, 1974, defeating the Boston Bruins, 1–0, in game six of the Stanley Cup Final in front of a then-capacity crowd of 17,007. At the height of the Cold War on January 11, 1976, the Flyers became the first NHL team to defeat (by 4–1) the vaunted hockey team of the Soviet Central Red Army (ЦСКА). Two games in the inaugural Canada Cup hockey tournament were also held at the Spectrum in September of that year, as the U.S. took on Czechoslovakia and the USSR.

Ten NHL or NBA playoff championship series were hosted at the Spectrum. The Flyers competed in the Stanley Cup Final in 1974, 1975, 1976, 1980, 1985, and 1987. The 76ers played in the NBA Finals in 1977, 1980, 1982, and 1983. The 1976 and 1992 NHL, and 1970 and 1976 NBA All-Star Games were also held here. The AHL Phantoms also won their first Calder Cup title on Spectrum ice before a sellout crowd of 17,380 on June 10, 1998, by defeating the Saint John Flames, 6–1.

The only visitors to win the Stanley Cup and NBA championship at the Spectrum were the Montreal Canadiens (1976) and the Los Angeles Lakers (1980) respectively.

The Spectrum is the only venue to host the NBA and NHL All-Star Games in the same season, doing so in 1976, when it also hosted that year's Final Four. It is also one of a handful of venues to host the Stanley Cup and NBA Finals at the same time, doing so in 1980 (all four major Philadelphia teams would reach the championship round of their respective sport in 1980).

=== College basketball tournaments ===
The Spectrum was used for many basketball tournaments, including Big Five games, eight Atlantic 10 Conference tournaments (1977, 1983, 1997–2002), the 1975, 1980 and 1992 NCAA East Regional (site of the famous last-second shot by Christian Laettner of Duke to beat Kentucky), and the 1976 and 1981 Final Fours (both won by Bob Knight's Indiana Hoosiers). Smaller conferences preferred holding tournament games at this venue over the larger Center nearby.

=== Bull riding ===
In 2003 and 2004, the PBR brought their Built Ford Tough Series tour to the Spectrum.

=== Notable concerts ===
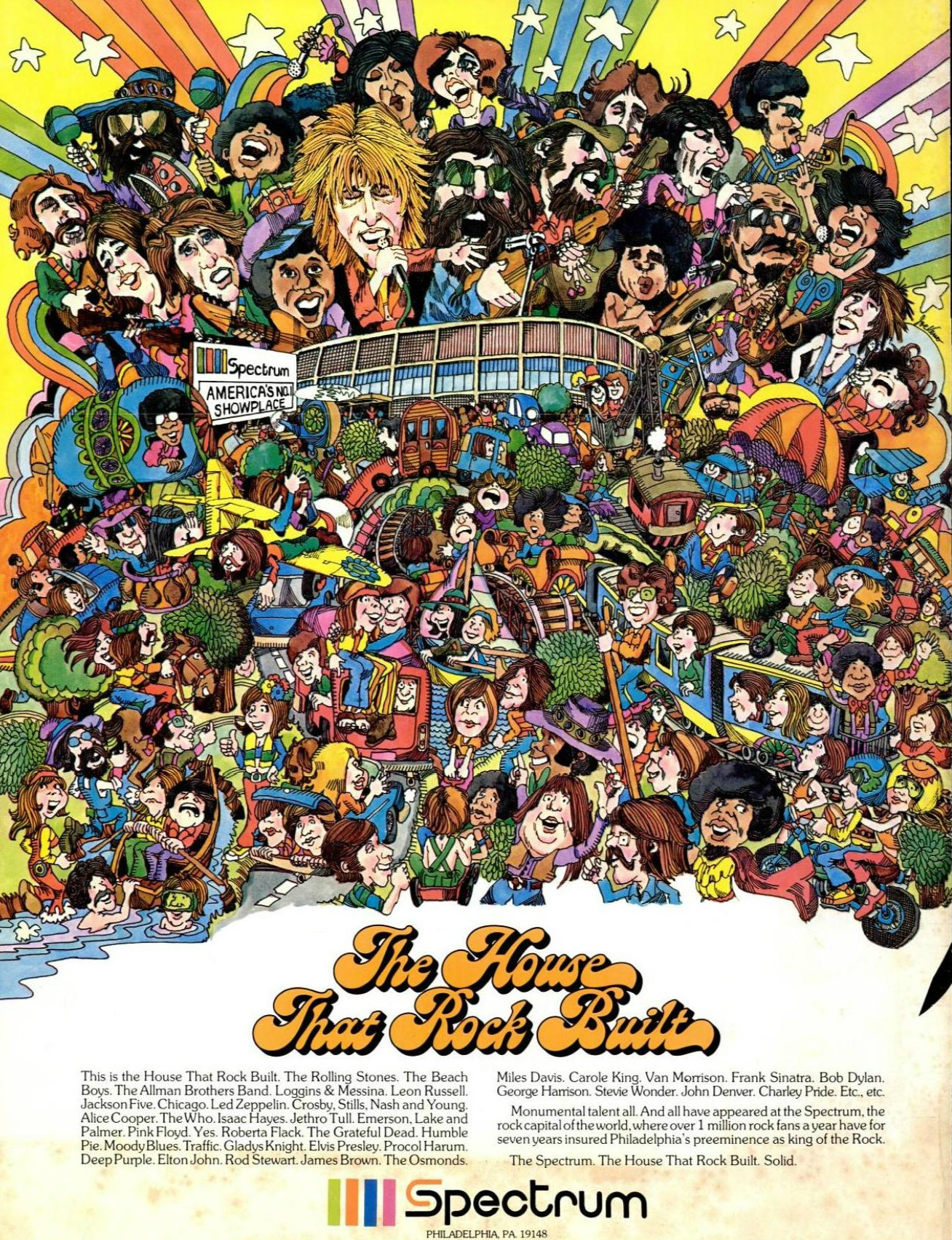
Billboard ad for the arena in 1974

Many concerts were staged at the Spectrum, often praised for its acoustic properties, beginning in the 1960s. In the 1970s, Electric Factory Concerts became the prominent concert promoter for the facility.

- Cream performed there during their farewell tour, supported by Lee Michaels.
- The First Quaker City Rock Festival was an early all-star show there, featuring Moby Grape, The Chambers Brothers, Vanilla Fudge, Big Brother & The Holding Company, and Buddy Guy among other acts.
- Duran Duran performed at the venue on March 3, 1984, during their Sing Blue Silver world tour.
- Depeche Mode performed at the venue six times between 1988 and 1998.
- Led Zeppelin performed on their second American tour on July 12, 1969, along with Buddy Guy, Al Kooper, Jethro Tull, and Johnny Winter.
- The Jimi Hendrix Experience performed on April 12, 1969, with Fat Mattress opening.
- The Doors performed a 103-minute show, a recording of which was released years later as Live in Philadelphia '70.
- The Grateful Dead played the Spectrum 53 times, by far the most of any musical act. Live albums recorded here include Dick's Picks Volume 36, Road Trips Full Show: Spectrum 11/5/79, Road Trips Full Show: Spectrum 11/6/79, Road Trips Volume 4 Number 4, Dave's Picks Volume 32, and Dave's Picks Volume 39.
- Bryan Adams performed during his Waking Up The World tour on May 15, 1994.
- Phish performed at the venue nine times between 1995 and 2003, most notably two shows on December 2–3, 1997, as part of their "Phish Destroys America" tour.
- Yes played the Spectrum 28 times between 1971 and 2004, including a matinee show in 1974 for their Tales from Topographic Oceans Tour, as well as two dates (August 3, 1989 and March 19, 1990) as "Anderson, Bruford, Wakeman and Howe". Yes keyboardist Rick Wakeman also performed solo shows at the Spectrum in 1974 and 1975.
- Elvis Presley played the Spectrum for five shows between 1971 and 1977, his final performance there was May 28, 1977, just months before his death.
- Bob Marley and The Wailers played at the venue on June 20, 1975, and June 5, 1978, in support of his Natty Dread and Kaya Tour respectively.
- Aerosmith played the venue 23 times between 1976 and 1994, including a few notorious performances in the late 1970s in which rowdy fans injured the band members with glass bottles and M-80s.
- Pink Floyd played the Spectrum in 1972, 1973, 1975 and 1977. They last played two shows there on June 28–29, 1977, during their Animals/In the Flesh Tour. On the second night (June 29, 1977), Floyd member Roger Waters fell ill and did most of the show after a painkiller injection. However, the painkiller wore off and was taken to the hospital and missed the final encore of "Us and Them" where second guitarist Snowy White had to fill in on bass guitar. Unbeknownst to the crowd, this was the first time that the rest of Pink Floyd (guitarist/vocalist David Gilmour, drummer Nick Mason and keyboard player Rick Wright) performed a song live without Waters (they would go on without Waters as of 1986). Waters' experience performing while ill at this venue would be documented on "Comfortably Numb".
- The Who performed at the Spectrum throughout the 1970s. The 1973 show was documented in a famous audio bootleg of their Quadrophenia performance. A CD has been released of John Entwistle's performance on March 15, 1975, when he opened for Humble Pie.
- 1978 saw the last tour of the original Black Sabbath lineup. Opening for them was Van Halen.
- Genesis regularly played the venue during the Phil Collins era from 1977 to 1986 (they would play Veterans Stadium on their 1992 We Can't Dance tour and the Wells Fargo Center on their 2007 Turn it On Again and 2021 The Last Domino? reunion tours). Their three November 1983 performances on the band's Mama Tour were recorded for a US FM radio broadcast and was released as a bootleg entitled "Three Nights in Philly". Collins would play the Spectrum on his own in September 1985, during his No Jacket Required Tour, in a concert rescheduled from May 18 of that year due to an Eastern Conference Finals game between the 76ers and the Boston Celtics.
- Queen performed at the Spectrum on August 22, 1980, during The Game Tour.
- The Jacksons performed at the Spectrum multiple times between 1971 and 1981.
- Dio performed at the Spectrum in 1984, with Twisted Sister as opener. This concert was filmed for the video release A Special from the Spectrum. Dio returned to the Spectrum in 1986; this concert was also filmed, for the video release Sacred Heart "The Video".
- Bon Jovi regularly performed at the Spectrum in the 1980s, playing six shows there during their Slippery When Wet Tour and three concerts on the New Jersey Syndicate Tour.
- Kid Rock appeared at the arena on May 9, 2002.
- KISS performed live during the Crazy Nights World Tour in 1987. The concert can be seen on the third disk of Kissology Volume Two: 1978–1991, although footage is incomplete.
- N.W.A performed with Eazy-E, Public Enemy, Too Short and Kwame on June 25, 1989.
- Metallica performed there in 1989 during the Damaged Justice tour. The band also played at the Spectrum in 1986 and 1992.
- MC Hammer performed in 1990 and 1992.
- AC/DC recorded the "Moneytalks" music video at their November 6, 1990 show.
- Guns N' Roses performed two shows in 1988, opening for Aerosmith, another three shows in 1991 and a later show was cancelled in 2002. On June 13, 1991, during the show, Axl Rose erupted after a fan had gotten into a fight with Guns N' Roses photographer Robert John when the fan kicked the camera out of his hands. Axl cursed out the fan, and challenged him to a fight. After the fan was ejected from the concert, the show continued.
- On the night of December 9, 1980, after learning of the assassination of John Lennon following a performance there the night before, Bruce Springsteen opened the show with a statement regarding Lennon and said, "It's a hard thing to come out and play but there's just nothing else you can do." With members of the E Street Band in tears, Springsteen and his band put on a 34-song marathon which ended nearly 3½ hours later, with a cover of "Twist and Shout". The Spectrum was the first arena Springsteen ever played at in 1976. In the following years, Springsteen would become one of the Spectrum's most popular concert acts, performing 42 shows between 1976 and 2009, thanks in part to the singer's large and devoted fan base in Pennsylvania.
- Rush performed at the Spectrum as part of their Grace Under Pressure tour on November 5, 1984.
- Iron Maiden played a sold-out show at the Spectrum on January 13, 1987, as part of Somewhere on Tour in support of Somewhere in Time.
- Van Halen performed at the Spectrum with Gary Cherone on May 24, 1998.
- Whitney Houston performed at the arena on June 23, 1994, during her The Bodyguard World Tour. The concert included her performing a medley of Aretha Franklin's classics and duetting with then-husband Bobby Brown on their R&B hit "Something in Common".
- Diana Ross & the Supremes' ill-fated Return to Love Tour kicked off at the Spectrum on June 14, 2000. The tour would be canceled a few weeks later.
- During the Spectrum's final year, Taylor Swift performed at the arena as part of her Fearless Tour, while P!nk performed there as part of her Funhouse Tour. P!nk is a Philadelphia-area native, while Swift was born in West Reading and spent part of her childhood there.
- The last public events at the arena took place on October 27–28 and 30–31, 2009, with Pearl Jam playing four concerts. The band came to the stage each night after a video montage of memorable Spectrum moments followed by the Rocky theme music. Over the four nights, Pearl Jam performed 103 different songs, with its final night on Halloween lasting over 3 hours and 35 minutes and including 41 songs.
- The final event was a large private cocktail party organized by Comcast Spectacor chairman Ed Snider on January 16, 2010. Musical acts included a recorded Kate Smith and a live Lauren Hart performing a duet of "God Bless America", headliner Earth, Wind & Fire, with the last set being a performance by Elvis Presley interpreter Johnny Seaton.

Philadelphia soul groups that performed at the Spectrum include LaBelle in '71 and Hall & Oates in '83. The O'Jays (they were signed to Philadelphia International) performed there in '73, and Lou Rawls (also signed to Philly International) performed there in '69. Boyz II Men from Philly performed there in '95.

Guns N' Roses performed at the Philadelphia Spectrum on August 4, 1988; August 5, 1988; June 13, 1991; December 16, 1991; and December 17, 1991.

=== Spectrum Theater ===
The Spectrum Theater was a venue for acts not big enough to fill the entire Spectrum arena. The stage was placed in the middle of the Spectrum floor, and the other half of the arena behind the stage was closed off with curtains, creating a theater-like environment. Some of the acts that played in this configuration included Frank Zappa in 1973, 1976 and 1977; David Bowie's Diamond Dogs Tour in 1974; The Kinks' Soap Opera Tour in May 1975, Bob Marley's Natty Dread Tour in 1975 and Kaya Tour in 1978; Bruce Springsteen in 1976; The Band in 1976, The Bee Gees in 1979; Peter Gabriel's tour in 1982; Howard Jones in 1985 and Julian Lennon with Chris Bliss on June 20, 1986.

=== The Flyers and 76ers' move ===
The 1995–96 NHL and NBA seasons were the final ones for the Flyers and the 76ers at the Spectrum. The 76ers' last game was a 112–92 loss to the Orlando Magic on April 19; on May 12, Eric Lindros scored the arena's final Flyers goal in the second period, and Mike Hough of the Florida Panthers scored the arena's final official NHL goal in the second overtime of game five of the 1996 Eastern Conference semifinals, a 2–1 Flyers loss. Although both the Flyers and 76ers moved across the parking lot to the new and larger Xfinity Mobile Arena (then CoreStates Center), the arena remained in place and was used by the Philadelphia Phantoms of the AHL, the Philadelphia KiXX of the NISL, the Philadelphia Soul of the Arena Football League for Saturday home games, and a variety of other sporting events and concerts.

The Spectrum had relatively few luxury suites or other amenities common in newer arenas. Additionally, the arena's sight lines were cited as a concern. Some seats in both the hockey and basketball configurations (especially those added in the upper level over the years) had badly obstructed views. There was only one concourse for all three levels, making for somewhat cramped conditions whenever attendance was anywhere near capacity.

=== Final season ===
A special logo was used for the final season of the Spectrum's use, featuring the arena's original pre-1994 logo and nickname.

On July 14, 2008, Comcast Spectacor Chairman Ed Snider officially announced that the Spectrum would be shuttered and torn down to make way for Philly Live!, a proposed retail, dining and entertainment hub. "This has been one of the hardest decisions I've ever had to make," said Snider. "The Spectrum is my baby. It's one of the greatest things that has ever happened to me."

The Phantoms commemorated the final season of the Spectrum by wearing a special patch on their uniforms, as illustrated on the right. The team also celebrated some of the building's memorable moments throughout the season. The Flyers marked the last season by playing two pre-season games at the Spectrum. They played the Carolina Hurricanes in an NHL pre-season game on September 27, 2008, and the Phantoms on October 7 of that same year. Before the game against Carolina, the Flyers honored the team captains in the franchise's history. Those honored in the pre-game ceremony were Lou Angotti, Ed Van Impe, Bob Clarke, Mel Bridgman, Bill Barber, Dave Poulin, Ron Sutter, Kevin Dineen, Éric Desjardins, Keith Primeau and Derian Hatcher.

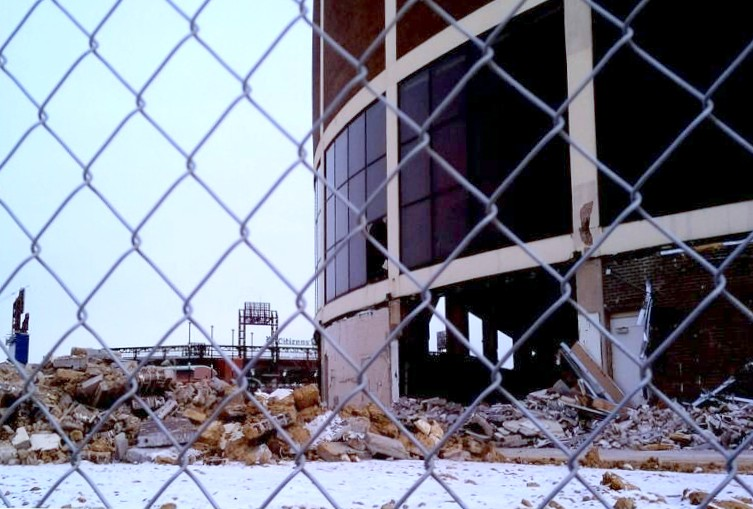
Wachovia Spectrum during demolition in 2010.

The last NCAA basketball game the Spectrum hosted saw the Villanova Wildcats defeat the Pittsburgh Panthers on January 28, 2009. The Sixers played one regular season game against Chicago Bulls on March 13, 2009, winning by a score of 104–101 in the final NBA game in the Spectrum. The game was sold out and attendance was 17,563.

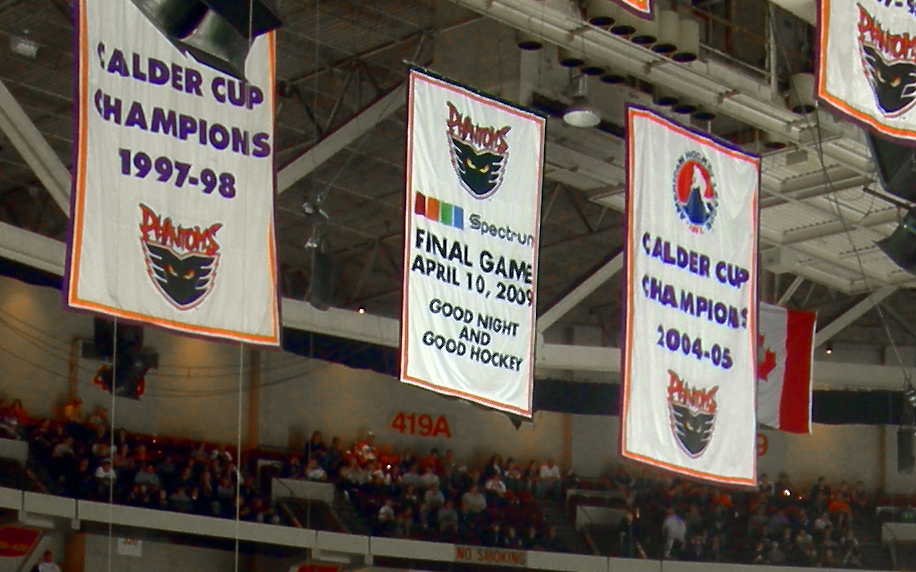
Banners for the final regular season hockey game at the Spectrum in Philadelphia, PA, on April 10, 2009. (Philadelphia Phantoms vs. Hershey Bears, 5–2).

The Phantoms' last regular season game at the Spectrum was played April 10, 2009, against the Hershey Bears, as the Phantoms won the game, 5–2, while the last Kixx game was against the Massachusetts Twisters on March 22. The Kixx moved onto the Temple University campus and played the 2009–10 season at the Liacouras Center. The Phantoms were sold to a Pittsburgh-based ownership group, and moved to Glens Falls, New York, for the 2009–10 season, and subsequently moved to Allentown, where they became the Flyers-affiliated Lehigh Valley Phantoms.

"With this season being the final season of the Wachovia Spectrum, we will celebrate the history of the Spectrum with an exciting, year-long, celebration of events," Comcast Spectacor President Peter Luukko said. Phish was rumored to be among the acts to commemorate the closing of the arena. "It is our hope and intent to bring back many of the musical acts and entertainers who have made the Spectrum 'America's Showplace.'" Bruce Springsteen and the E Street Band played two shows at The Spectrum on April 28 and 29 as part of their Working on a Dream Tour, and returned on October 13–14 and 19–20 for their Spectrum swan song. Springsteen debuted a specially-written version of the song "Wrecking Ball", which he had written in honor of the demolition of Giants Stadium, with revised lyrics to honor the Spectrum's history.

A scheduled concert with Leonard Cohen on October 22 was moved to the Tower Theatre in Upper Darby, instead. On October 23, 2009, Philadelphia area musicians The Hooters, Todd Rundgren and Hall & Oates headlined a concert titled "Last Call". Tickets were as low as $6.00. The remaining members of the Grateful Dead; including Bob Weir, Phil Lesh, Mickey Hart, Bill Kreutzmann performed their final set of shows at the Spectrum on May 1 and 2, 2009; the show of May 2 was their 54th consecutive sell-out at the Spectrum. The Dead closed the show of May 2 with the song "Samson and Delilah". The song contains the fitting refrain "If I had my way, I would tear this old building down." The lyric was changed by the band's singer Bob Weir to say "I wouldn't tear this old building down." With the demolition of The Spectrum, all venues at which The Grateful Dead played through their career within the City of Philadelphia, except for the Irvine Auditorium, have succumbed to the wrecking ball.

On October 27, 28, 30, and 31, American rock band Pearl Jam played over one hundred unique songs across the four days. On the final night, the band played 34 songs over nearly four hours before ending with their hit "Yellow Ledbetter".

== The Spectrum and the South Philadelphia Sports Complex ==
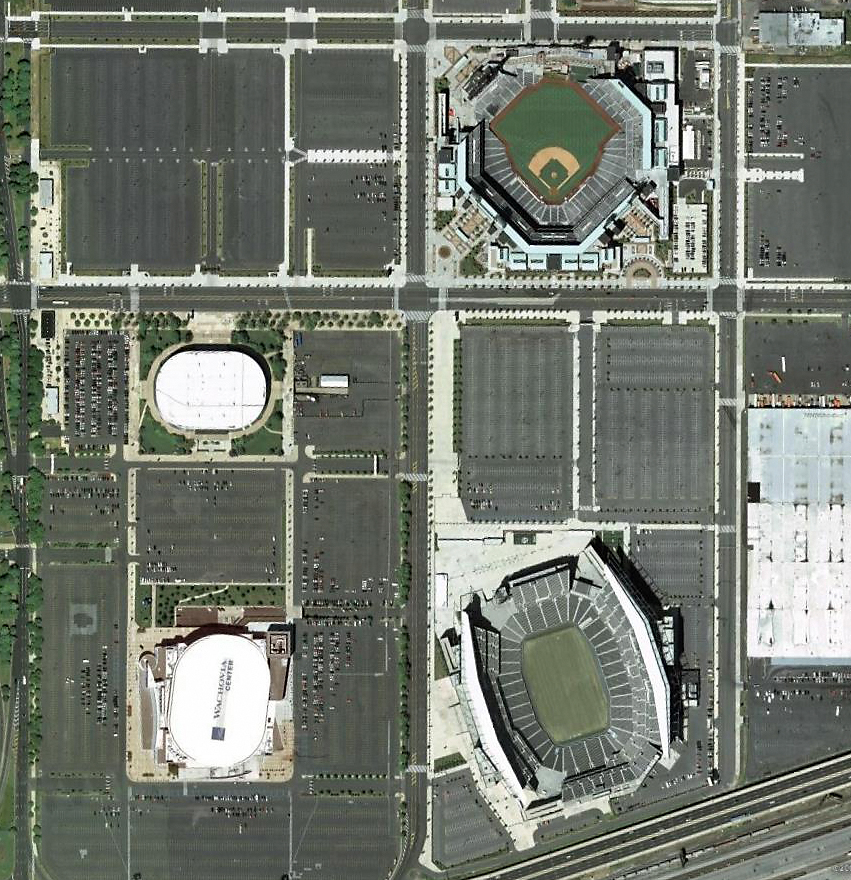
An 2008 aerial view of the South Philadelphia Sports Complex with the Spectrum at center left

Opened in 1967 as the first of the five modern facilities to be built at the South Philadelphia Sports Complex between 1967 and 2004, by the time it closed in 2009 the Spectrum was the oldest of the four venues still standing of the two indoor arenas and four outdoor stadiums built at the South end of Broad Street since 1926. The complex's total area expanded with the addition of each new facility and now takes up the entire southeast quadrant of the grounds occupied in 1926 by Philadelphia's Sesqui-Centennial International Exposition, a massive 184-day World's fair built on 700+ acres of until then largely undeveloped city-owned swamp and park land, including League Island Park adjacent to the U.S. Navy Yard bounded by 10th Street, Packer Ave., 23rd Street, and Terminal Avenue. The Spectrum itself occupied the portion of the Exposition's grounds on the south side of Pattison Avenue between Broad and 11th Streets that in 1926 served as the fair's main trolley terminal operated by the Philadelphia Rapid Transit Company.

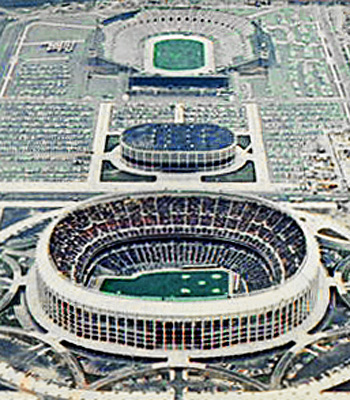
The Spectrum, with John F. Kennedy Stadium above it and Veterans Stadium below it

For its first 25 years, the Spectrum overlooked the 102,000-seat John F. Kennedy Stadium, known prior to 1964 as "Municipal Stadium", located roughly 600 feet (180 m) south of the indoor arena. Opened on April 15, 1926, the stadium was also the Sesqui-Centennial Exposition's only intentionally permanent facility. The site of 42 Army–Navy Games between 1936 and 1979, JFK Stadium eventually fell into disuse in favor of the newer nearby Veterans Stadium, was condemned in 1989, and demolished in 1992 to make way for the Xfinity Mobile Arena which opened four years later in August 1996. Known earlier as the "CoreStates Center" (1996–1998), the "First Union Center" (1998–2003), and the "Wachovia Center" (July 2003 – June 2010), the 20,000-plus-seat indoor arena replaced the Spectrum as the home of the Flyers, 76ers, and Philadelphia Wings of the National Lacrosse League beginning with each club's 1996–97 season. With the demolition of the Spectrum, Xfinity Mobile Arena has become the oldest of the complex's three current venues.

The Spectrum's closest sports complex neighbor was Veterans Stadium (opened 1971, closed 2003, demolished 2004), which was located north of the arena directly across Pattison Avenue. The 60,000-plus-seat "Vet" accommodated MLB's Philadelphia Phillies and the NFL's Philadelphia Eagles for just over three decades before it was itself replaced by two new facilities. In 2003 the Eagles moved to Lincoln Financial Field, a purpose-built football/soccer stadium located SE of the Spectrum site directly across 11th Street from Xfinity Mobile Arena. The following year, the Phillies relocated to Citizens Bank Park, a dedicated baseball stadium completed in 2004 and located diagonally across from the Spectrum site at the northeast corner of Pattison Ave and Citizens Bank Way (11th St.), immediately east of the former Veterans Stadium site which now serves as a parking lot for the entire complex. In 2017, the Phillies' spring training complex in Clearwater, Florida was renamed Spectrum Field after Bright House Networks was purchased by Charter Communications. While named for Charter's residential service, the name invoked memories of the Spectrum arena.

Another NBA arena (Spectrum Center, the home of the Charlotte Hornets) currently includes "Spectrum" in its name, although again it refers to the Charter residential service whose naming rights are attached to that building.

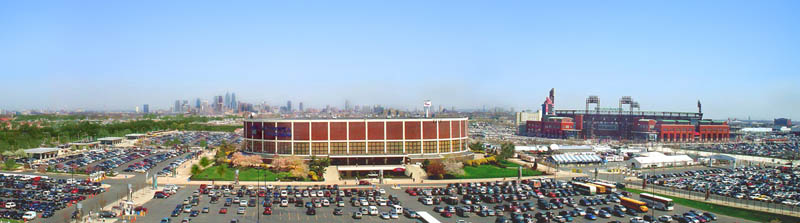
The Spectrum (center) was the oldest (1967) of the four venues which made up the South Philadelphia Sports Complex in this 2004 view from Xfinity Mobile Arena (1996). Citizens Bank Park (right) is the complex's newest (2004) facility while Lincoln Financial Field (2003) is just out of view to the far right.

== Demolition ==
Although the Spectrum formally closed on October 31, 2009, demolition of the structure did not begin for more than a year with internal work commencing on November 8, 2010. Two weeks later a public "wrecking ball ceremony" attended by some of the athletes who made the building famous such as Hockey Hall of Famers Bernie Parent and Bob Clarke of the Flyers and Hall of Famer Julius Erving of the 76ers, was held in the adjacent parking lot "H" on November 23, 2010, to formally begin its external demolition. However, unlike Veterans Stadium, its one-time neighbor, which had been located immediately across Pattison Avenue from the Spectrum before it was imploded on March 21, 2004, the almost half-year process of demolishing the then-44-year-old arena, done without the use of explosives, was completed in May 2011. This was done to protect its other sports facilities from dust. Water was used to prevent dust from spreading.

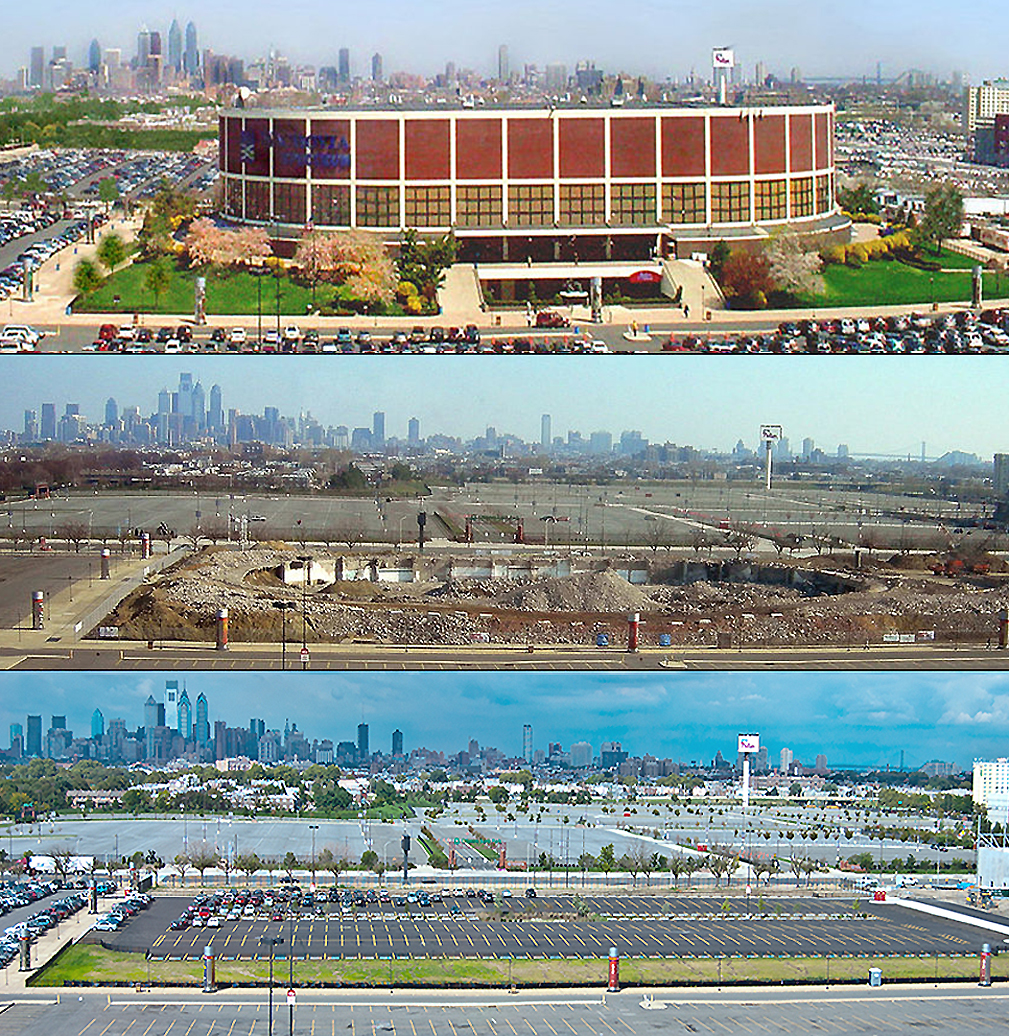
Composite before, during and after image of the Spectrum site. The top image was taken in April 2004, five and a half years before the arena was closed. The middle image was taken seven years later as its demolition was being completed in April 2011. The white areas seen at ground level of this image were the back walls of the hockey and basketball locker rooms used by the Flyers, 76ers, Phantoms, Kixx, and Wings and visiting teams. The parking lot across Pattison Avenue from the Spectrum was the former site of Veterans Stadium (demolished in 2004). The bottom image is how the site appeared in September 2011 after it had been converted to a parking lot. All three images were taken from the same location in the Wells Fargo Center, the arena that replaced the Spectrum. The tallest building visible in the distant Philadelphia skyline (just to the left of the Spectrum site) in the 2011 images is the 59-story Comcast Center (completed in 2008), the headquarters building of the Comcast Corporation which owns both the Spectrum and Wells Fargo Center.

The New South Philadelphia Arena is planned to be built on the Spectrum's site, and the new arena's design is expected to echo that of the Spectrum.

== Statues ==
A statue of Sylvester Stallone, depicted in his role of Philadelphia boxer Rocky Balboa, stood for many years in front of the main Pattison Avenue entrance of the Spectrum, which had been represented in the movie as the site of Rocky's first and second fights with Apollo Creed, although the fight sequences were actually filmed at the Los Angeles Memorial Sports Arena. The statue was removed several times over the years to be used in the filming of sequels to the original film.

In September 2006, it was given a new home in an area near the base of the steps of the Philadelphia Museum of Art not far from where a spot on the plaza at the top of the Museum's steps where it had appeared in the film Rocky III. Since the statue was not deemed "art," it was moved around the corner of the museum on Kelly Drive. Other statues that stood in the arena area included:

- "Score!", a statue depicting Flyers' right-wing Gary Dornhoefer's game-winning overtime goal in game five of the 1973 Stanley Cup Quarterfinals against the Minnesota North Stars;
- A statue of Kate Smith, the Flyers' good luck charm, whose rendition of "God Bless America" is believed to have helped the Flyers become back-to-back Stanley Cup Champions in 1974 and 1975;
- A statue of Julius Erving, who played for the Philadelphia 76ers from 1976 to 1987.

The statues have been incorporated into the design of Stateside Live!.

== Former tenants ==
=== Full-time ===
- Philadelphia Flyers of the NHL
- Philadelphia 76ers of the NBA
- Two of the three incarnations of the Philadelphia Wings (NLL I Original franchise 1974–75 and Eagle League/MILL/NLL II Second franchise 1987–1996)
- Philadelphia Phantoms of the AHL
- Philadelphia KiXX of the NPSL
- Philadelphia Bulldogs of the RHI
- Philadelphia Freedoms of World Team Tennis (1974)
- Philadelphia Fever of the original Major Indoor Soccer League

=== Part-time ===
- Villanova University Wildcats of the NCAA Big East Conference; some high-attendance men's basketball home games which the on-campus arena, The Pavilion, was too small to accommodate.
- Philadelphia Soul of the Arena Football League (when the Wells Fargo Center was not available, typically on Saturday home dates)

== Notable events ==
=== Basketball ===
- NBA All-Star Game – 1970, 1976
- NCAA Division I men's basketball tournament – 1976 and 1981 Men's Final Four (both won by Indiana); 1980 East Regional (won by Iowa) and 1992 East Regional (won by Duke)
- NBA Finals – 1977, 1980, 1982, 1983
  - The Los Angeles Lakers won the 1979–80 NBA Championship at the Spectrum, winning game six and the series, 4–2.

=== Boxing ===
- Mike Tyson vs. Buster Mathis Jr. – 1995

=== Hockey ===
- NHL Stanley Cup Final – 1974, 1975, 1976, 1980, 1985, 1987
  - The Flyers won the 1973–74 Stanley Cup at the Spectrum, defeating the Boston Bruins in game six and winning the series, 4–2.
  - The Montreal Canadiens won the 1975–76 Stanley Cup at the Spectrum, winning game four and the series, 4–0.
- NHL All-Star Game – 1976, 1992
- Philadelphia Flyers vs. Soviet Central Red Army Hockey Team (exhibition) – 1976
- 1976 Canada Cup (two games)
- Philadelphia Flyers vs. Soviet Wings Hockey Team - 1979
- AHL Calder Cup Finals – 1998
  - The Phantoms won the Calder Cup at the Spectrum, defeating the Saint John Flames in game six and winning the series, 4–2.

=== Soccer ===
- NPSL Championship – 2001
- MISL Championship – 2002

=== Wrestling ===
- WWF SummerSlam '90 – 1990
- WWF King of the Ring – 1995
- WCW Monday Nitro (April 14, 1997 / November 3, 1997 / March 3, 1998 / October 18, 1999)
- WCW Thunder (June 18, 1998 / February 16, 2000)

=== Concerts ===
- Ten Years After – 1970
- Elvis Presley, 1971, 1974, 1976, 1977
- The Doors: The Doors Live in Philadelphia '70 – 1970
- The Rolling Stones 1969, 1972, 1975
- Jethro Tull 1969, 1977, 1978, 1979, 1982, 1989, 1990, 1993, 1996
- The Who – Quadrophenia tour 1973
- Alice Cooper – 1973
- J Geils Band – 1973
- Marshall Tucker Band – 1973
- Emerson, Lake & Palmer – 1973
- Foghat – 1973
- Grateful Dead – 50+ shows, including Dick's Picks Volume 36
- Elton John – 1973
- Frank Sinatra – 1973
- Edgar Winter – 1973
- Yes – 1974
- Genesis – 1977, 1978, 1980 (2 nights), 1981 (3 nights), 1983 (3 nights), 1986 (4 nights)
- Fleetwood Mac – 1977
- Pink Floyd: In the Flesh Tour – 1977
- Billy Joel, including songs recorded for Songs in the Attic – 1980
- Queen – The Game Tour and Hot Space Tour – 1980 and 1982
- Peter Gabriel – 1982, 1986 (4 nights), 1993 (4 nights)
- Sparks: In Outer Space tour – July 14, 1983
- Duran Duran – March 10, 1984
- Dio: A Special from the Spectrum – 1984
- Rush: Power Windows Tour – 1986
- Dio: Sacred Heart "The Video" – 1986
- Cyndi Lauper: True Colors tour – 1986
- Iron Maiden: Somewhere on Tour – 1987
- The Cars: Door to Door Tour – 1987
- Van Halen: OU812 Tour 1988
- Metallica – Damaged Justice tour 1989
- N.W.A – Straight Outta Compton tour 1989
- Skid Row – Slave to the Grind tour 1992
- Mariah Carey: Music Box Tour – 1993
- Nine Inch Nails: Further Down The Spiral Tour – 1994
- Whitney Houston: The Bodyguard World Tour – 1994
- Madonna: Blond Ambition World Tour – 1990 and The Girlie Show – 1993
- Duran Duran: Astronaut Tour (Reunion Tour) – April 2, 2005
- Pearl Jam: Backspacer tour – 2009
- Bruce Springsteen and the E Street Band: Working on a Dream Tour – 2009
- Guns N' Roses; Appetite for Destruction Tour – August 4, 1988, August 5, 1988, and Use Your Illusion Tour – June 13, 1991, December 16, 1991, December 17, 1991.

=== Fictional events ===
- Rocky Balboa vs. Apollo Creed, Heavyweight Championship — January 1, 1976, November 25, 1976
- Rocky Balboa vs. Clubber Lang, Heavyweight Championship — August 15, 1981

=== Other events ===
- U.S. Figure Skating Championships – 1968
- MILL Championship – 1989, 1992, 1995
- Nightmares Xtreme Scream Park – 2004, 2005, 2006
- Enon Tabernacle Baptist Church Resurrection Sunday Worship Service 2000
- Monster Jam ???–2009

Events and tenants
Preceded by first arena	Home of the Philadelphia Flyers; 1967–1996	Succeeded by Xfinity Mobile Arena
Preceded by Philadelphia Arena	Home of the Philadelphia 76ers 1967–1996	Succeeded by Xfinity Mobile Arena
Preceded by first arena	Home of the Philadelphia Phantoms; 1996–2009	Succeeded by Glens Falls Civic Center
Preceded by first arena	Home of the Philadelphia Kixx; 1996–2009	Succeeded by Liacouras Center
Preceded by Montreal Forum; Chicago Stadium	Host of the NHL All-Star Game; 1976; 1992	Succeeded by Pacific Coliseum; Montreal Forum
Preceded by Palazzo dello Sport; Rome	FIBA Intercontinental Cup; Final Venue; 1968	Succeeded by Macon Coliseum; Macon
Preceded by Aixoise C.C. Aix-en-Provence	Fed Cup; Final Venue; 1976	Succeeded by Devonshire Park; Eastbourne
