= Holy Diver (video game) =

1989 video game

- Developer: Irem
- Publishers: Irem; Retro-Bit
- Designer: Irem
- Platforms: Family Computer, Nintendo Entertainment System
- Release: JP: April 28, 1989; WW: July 2018
- Genre: Platform
- Mode: Single-player

Holy Diver (Note: Japanese: ホーリー・ダイヴァー, Hepburn: Hōrī Daivā) is a platform video game released in 1989 by Irem for the Family Computer.

The game would remain Japan-exclusive until 2018, when Retro-Bit published the game for the Nintendo Entertainment System worldwide. It is widely considered the most difficult game for the NES and one of the most difficult games ever made.

== Plot ==
It is the 666th year for the world of magic, and the Crimson Kingdom is facing destruction at the hands of the Black Slayer, Demon King of the Underground Dark Empire. Realizing that his days are numbered, the 16th Crimson Emperor, Ronnie IV, decides to entrust his two infant sons, Randy and Zakk, to his faithful servant, Ozzy. With Slayer's forces closing in, Ozzy, Randy and Zakk escape to another dimension, with the hope of eventually bringing light back into the world.

Over the following 17 years, Randy, Zakk, and Ozzy devote and train themselves to the cause of Magic Justice, becoming wizard kings. Meanwhile, Black Slayer has increased his empire over the countryside, making his interdimensional forces even stronger. In order to defeat Black Slayer and his army, Randy must retrieve the Five Crimson Emblem Seals. Making matters worse, Randy now must wage his war against Black Slayer alone, for Zakk suddenly goes missing and Ozzy passes away.

== Gameplay ==
The game consists of six stages in total. After defeating the boss at the end of each level, the player can learn magic spells such as a spell that can freeze lava.

It is similar to the game Getsu Fūma Den. In fact, one of the stages has sprites and graphics similar to those found in Konami's other game, Contra (the final boss is also very similar to Contra's). The HUD is like the one used in Nintendo's Zelda II: The Adventure of Link.

The player has an infinite supply of fireballs to attack enemies. These enemies include gargoyles and flying eyeballs.

In order to find and defeat Black Slayer, the player must travel through six stages, which primarily consist of forests, castles, and caverns, all while seeking the Five Crimson Family Seals. The seals are powerful magic spells, which are Twin Fire, Blizzard, Rock Breaker, Overdrive and Thunder. In addition to acquiring the seals, the player must also seek out the Bracelet, Jump Boots, Wizard's Staff, and the Cape of Protection, all of which assist physical strength and endurance.

== Development ==
Developed by Japanese video game company Irem, the game is based on the 1983 album Holy Diver by the band Dio, but the game was not officially licensed from the band. The game has four main characters, named after musicians Ronnie James Dio, Ozzy Osbourne, Zakk Wylde, and Randy Rhoads. Other characters and locations in the game are references to rock music such as the Crimson Kingdom and Black Slayer.

== Release ==
The game was self-published by Irem and released on April 28, 1989 for the Family Computer in Japan. The game was scheduled for a North American release in the same year, and even received a brief preview in Electronic Gaming Monthly, but the game was never released outside Japan. Since release, the game has gone onto becoming a rare game that is sought after by collectors. In 2018, the title was noted to cost around US$75 for just the cartridge, and up to US$200 for the complete game with box and manual. Also, unauthorized reproductions of the game have been produced and sold as well.

In 2018, 29 years after the game was first released, distributor Retro-Bit published a worldwide physical re-release for the Nintendo Entertainment System. This was the first time the game was released outside of Japan, and was translated into English. The new edition is limited to 2,900 copies, and costs US$35 for the regular version, and US$60 for the Collector's Edition, which includes a hard embossed box, pins, stickers, art prints and a hard covered notebook. The game was also released on Retro-Bit's microconsole, the Super Retro-Cade.

== Reception ==
Multiple reviewers both contemporary and retrospective noted the game as very difficult. Many reviewers and previews also noted the similarity to Konami's earlier Castlevania NES installments, with one publication calling the game a "Castlevania clone".

Weekly Famitsu on release gave the game a 22 out of 40 score. Brazilian magazine VideoGame gave the game an overall score of 3 out of 5.

In 2018, Destructoid gave the game a positive review.
