= Holy Diver – Live =

2006 live album by Dio

Live album by Dio
- Released: April 17, 2006
- Recorded: October 22, 2005
- Venue: London Astoria (London)
- Genre: Heavy metal
- Length: 113:40
- Label: Eagle
- Producer: Ronnie James Dio

Dio chronology
Evil or Divine – Live in New York City (2005)	Holy Diver – Live (2006)	At Donington UK: Live 1983 & 1987 (2010)

Ronnie James Dio chronology
Evil or Divine – Live in New York City (2005)	Holy Diver – Live (2006)	Black Sabbath: The Dio Years (2007)

Holy Diver – Live

Video by Dio
- Released: April 17, 2006
- Recorded: October 22, 2005
- Venue: London Astoria (London)
- Genre: Heavy metal
- Length: 125 min.
- Label: Eagle Vision
- Director: Perry Joseph
- Producer: Perry Joseph, Geoff Kenpin, Terry Shand

Dio chronology
We Rock (2005)	Holy Diver – Live (2006)

Professional ratings
Review scores
Source	Rating
AllMusic	3.5/5 stars
Blabbermouth.net	5/10
Live-Metal.net	8.5/10

Holy Diver – Live is a live album by American heavy metal band Dio, recorded on tour in 2005. On disc 1, the band performs Holy Diver in its entirety, while disc 2 contains live versions of other songs from Dio's back catalog. It was released in, CD, DVD and Blu-ray formats.

== CD track listing ==
All lyrics are written by Ronnie James Dio, music as stated.

Disc one
No.	Title	Music	Length
1.	"Stand Up and Shout"	Dio, Jimmy Bain	4:33
2.	"Holy Diver"	Dio	4:46
3.	"Gypsy"	Dio, Vivian Campbell	9:46
4.	"Caught in the Middle"	Dio, Vinny Appice, Campbell	4:51
5.	"Don't Talk to Strangers"	Dio	5:11
6.	"Straight Through the Heart"	Dio, Bain	4:37
7.	"Invisible"	Dio, Appice, Campbell	5:17
8.	"Rainbow in the Dark"	Dio, Appice, Bain, Campbell	4:46
9.	"Shame on the Night"	Dio, Appice, Bain, Campbell	16:58

Disc two
No.	Title	Music	Length
1.	"Tarot Woman"	Ritchie Blackmore, Dio	6:53
2.	"The Sign of the Southern Cross"	Geezer Butler, Dio, Tony Iommi	3:21
3.	"One Night in the City"	Dio, Appice, Bain, Campbell	6:10
4.	"Gates of Babylon"	Blackmore, Dio	8:23
5.	"Heaven and Hell"	Butler, Dio, Iommi, Bill Ward	11:25
6.	"Man on the Silver Mountain"	Blackmore, Dio	4:14
7.	"Long Live Rock 'N' Roll"	Blackmore, Dio	6:14
8.	"We Rock"	Dio	6:21

=== Charts ===
Chart (2006)	Peak position
UK Independent Albums (OCC)	16
UK Rock & Metal Albums (OCC)	6

Chart (2021)	Peak position
German Albums (Offizielle Top 100)	19
UK Independent Albums (OCC)	38
UK Rock & Metal Albums (OCC)	21

== DVD track listing ==
1. "Tarot Woman"
2. "The Sign of The Southern Cross"
3. "One Night in the City"
4. "Stand up and Shout"
5. "Holy Diver"
6. "Gypsy"
7. "Caught in the Middle"
8. "Don't Talk to Strangers"
9. "Straight Through the Heart"
10. "Invisible"
11. "Rainbow in the Dark"
12. "Shame on the Night"
13. "Gates of Babylon"
14. "Heaven and Hell"
15. "Man on the Silver Mountain"
16. "Long Live Rock and Roll"
17. "We Rock"

=== Certifications ===
Region	Certification	Certified units/sales
United States (RIAA)	Gold	50,000^{^}
^{^} Shipments figures based on certification alone.

== Band ==
- Ronnie James Dio – vocals
- Doug Aldrich – guitar
- Rudy Sarzo – bass
- Simon Wright – drums
- Scott Warren – keyboards
