= Scott Warren =

American keyboardist (born 1962)

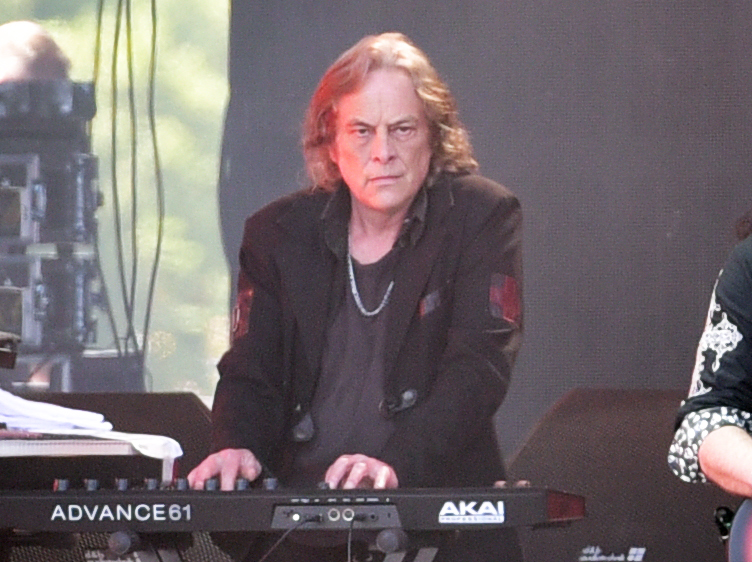
- Warren performing in 2024

Background information
- Born: November 3, 1962 (age 62); Chicago, Illinois
- Genres: Heavy metal; hard rock
- Occupation: Keyboardist
- Member of: Dio Disciples
- Formerly of: Dio; Warrant; Heaven & Hell; Black Sabbath; Keel; Type O Negative

Scott Warren (born November 3, 1962) is an American musician best known as the keyboardist for the heavy metal band Dio from 1994 until the band's dissolution in 2010.

He began playing keyboard instruments at six years old. He first taught himself how to play, but was later trained professionally at Dick Grove School of Music.

In addition to Dio, Warren has worked with the bands Warrant, Keel, Berlin, and Heaven & Hell, the latter of which also featured Ronnie James Dio.

Today Warren is part of the band Dio Disciples, which includes surviving members of the final line-up of Dio, along with former Lynch Mob vocalist Oni Logan. He also plays in the band Hellion, alongside fellow Dio Disciples member Simon Wright.

== Dio ==
Warren joined Dio to play keyboards on the Strange Highways tour in 1993. He stayed in the band on and off until Ronnie James Dio's death in 2010 from stomach cancer; he was the second longest-serving member of the band after Dio himself. A highlight of Warren's work with Dio is the song "Before the Fall" from the 2002 album Killing the Dragon, in which Warren plays two organ solos. After Dio's death, Warren wrote:

"How can I express what 17 years next to Ronnie now means to me? He has led me on an incredible journey. I have been blessed by his presence, and his voice. He was my surrogate father, my brother, my friend, my teacher AND my loyal advocate. Our fearless leader. He never let us down. He was never not out to prove it. Because he 'WAS' it. Just a class act. Life without him will never be the same. Yet it is not because of these things, that I know He IS in Heaven. But that's another story.

I will miss you, my dear friend.

"RJD RIP"

Warren also filled in on keyboards for Josh Silver in the band Type O Negative on their last tour.
