= Dio (band) =

American heavy metal band (1982–2010)

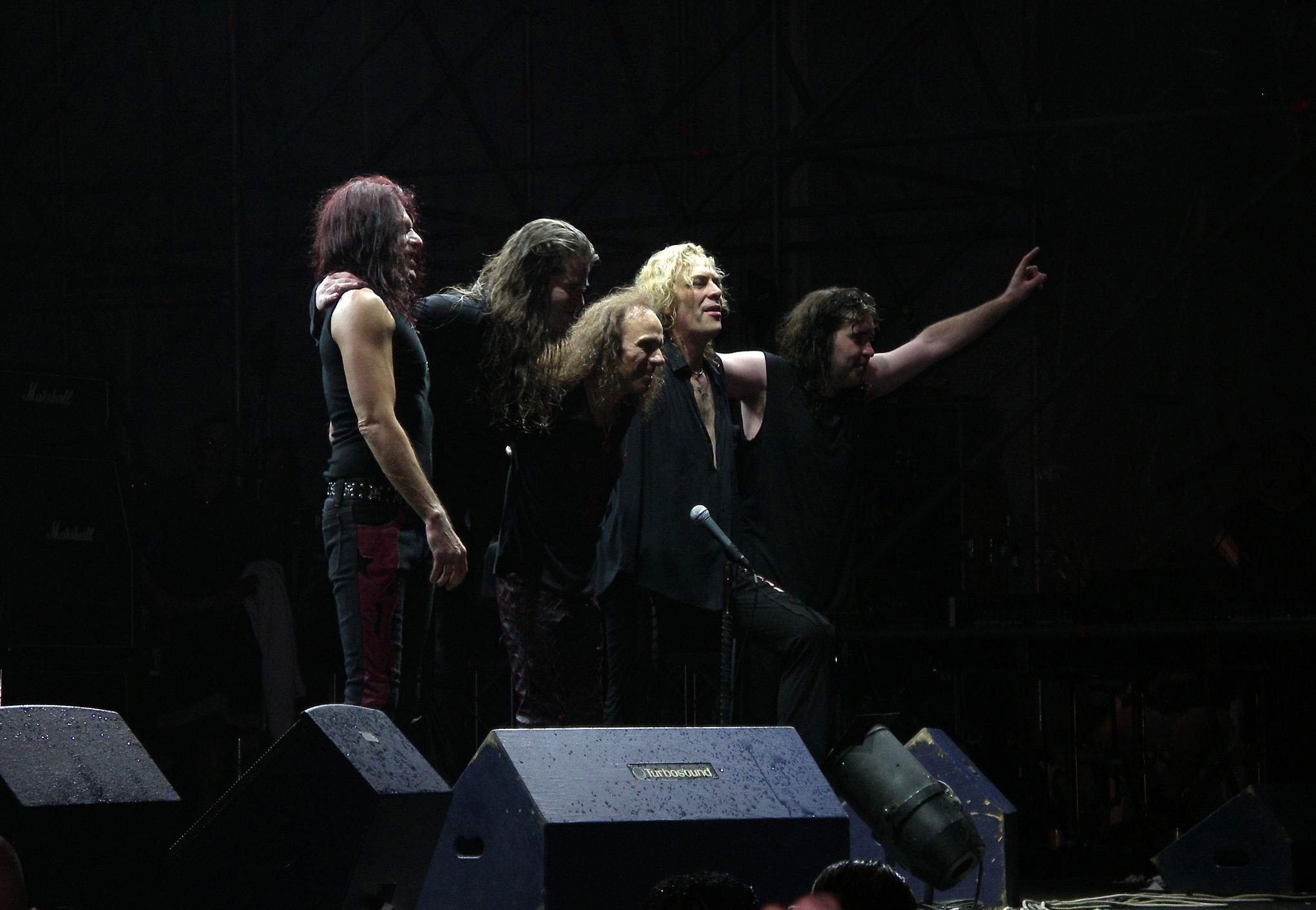
- Dio in 2005

Background information
- Origin: Cortland, New York, U.S.
- Genre: Heavy metal
- Works: Discography
- Years active: 1982–2010
- Labels: Eagle; Warner Bros.; Reprise; Universal; Vertigo; Phonogram; Spitfire; Sanctuary
- Spinoffs: Heaven & Hell; Last in Line; Dio Disciples
- Spinoff of: Black Sabbath; Rainbow
- Past members: See below
- Website: www.ronniejamesdio.com

Dio was an American heavy metal band formed in 1982 and led by vocalist Ronnie James Dio. Dio left Black Sabbath with intentions to form a new band with fellow former Black Sabbath member, drummer Vinny Appice. The band released ten studio albums and had numerous lineup changes over the years, with Dio himself being the only constant member. Guitarists included Vivian Campbell, Craig Goldy, Doug Aldrich, Warren DeMartini, Tracy G, Jake E. Lee and Rowan Robertson.

The band dissolved in 2010 when Ronnie James Dio died of stomach cancer at the age of 67. Ronnie James Dio has sold over 50 million records worldwide.

== Biography ==
=== Origins and Holy Diver (1982–1983) ===
In 1982, disagreements originating over the mixing of Black Sabbath's Live Evil album resulted in the departures of Ronnie James Dio and Vinny Appice from the band. Wanting to continue together as a band, the two formed Dio in October 1982 in Los Angeles with bassist, and Dio's former bandmate in Rainbow, Jimmy Bain and guitarist Jake E. Lee (formerly of then-up-and-upcoming bands Ratt and Rough Cutt). Not long after the band's formation, Dio parted ways with Lee (who would later join Ozzy Osbourne's solo band) due to musical differences, and he was replaced by Vivian Campbell. The following May, the band released their debut album, Holy Diver, which featured two hit singles – "Rainbow in the Dark" and "Holy Diver" – that gained popularity, in part from MTV. Dio and Bain played keyboards in the studio, but keyboardist Claude Schnell was recruited for live shows in 1983 prior to the Holy Diver tour. Schnell played to the side of the stage on the first two tours before coming out front in 1985. Dio had this to say of the band's origins:

It was a good time to be in that band. It was perfect for us. Everything just fell into place. The ethic in rehearsal was amazing. The effort in the recording was just as good. Everybody wanted it to be great. We really believed in what we were doing and couldn't wait to get that product out and have people hear it.

=== The Last in Line to Dream Evil (1984–1989) ===
Now a quintet with Schnell on keyboards, the band released their second studio album, The Last in Line, on July 2, 1984. It was followed by their third album, Sacred Heart, which was released on August 13, 1985.

In 1985, Dio, Campbell and Bain also wrote the song "Stars" for the Hear 'n Aid project, with many other heavy metal luminaries of the time contributing. Campbell became unhappy working with Dio, and the rift between them culminated in Campbell being fired from Dio's band. Campbell was subsequently invited to join Whitesnake in 1987. Several songs were recorded live during the Sacred Heart tour for the 1986 Intermission EP with Campbell still on guitar, however the EP also contained the studio track "Time To Burn", which served to introduce fans to Craig Goldy as the new guitarist.

On July 21, 1987, their fourth album Dream Evil was released. After Dream Evil, Goldy, wanting to pursue solo projects, left the band. In June 1989, 18-year-old Rowan Robertson was announced as Goldy's successor but further changes were to follow, with Schnell, Bain and Appice leaving the band.

=== Changes (1990–1999) ===
Schnell, Bain, and Appice were replaced, respectively, with Jens Johansson, Teddy Cook, and former AC/DC drummer Simon Wright. The new band released the album Lock Up the Wolves in the spring of 1990. During the tour, Dio had a chance meeting with former Black Sabbath bandmate Geezer Butler which led to that band's short-lived reunion, producing one album, Dehumanizer. After this, Dio reassembled Dio once again, bringing back Appice on the drums, but discarding everyone else. By early 1993, guitarist Tracy G, keyboardist Scott Warren of Warrant and bassist Jeff Pilson of Dokken had all joined. During this era, the band abandoned fantasy themed songs and focused on modern issues. As a result, some fans regard the albums made during this period—1993's Strange Highways, 1996's Angry Machines and the live album Inferno: Last in Live—as the worst in Dio's catalogue, while others view them positively as a step away from the outdated sound of the 1980s. With disappointing record sales for Angry Machines, management wanted the band to go back to their earlier style prompting the departure of Tracy G to be replaced by the returning Craig Goldy. In addition, Appice left Dio once again.

=== Comeback (2000–2004) ===
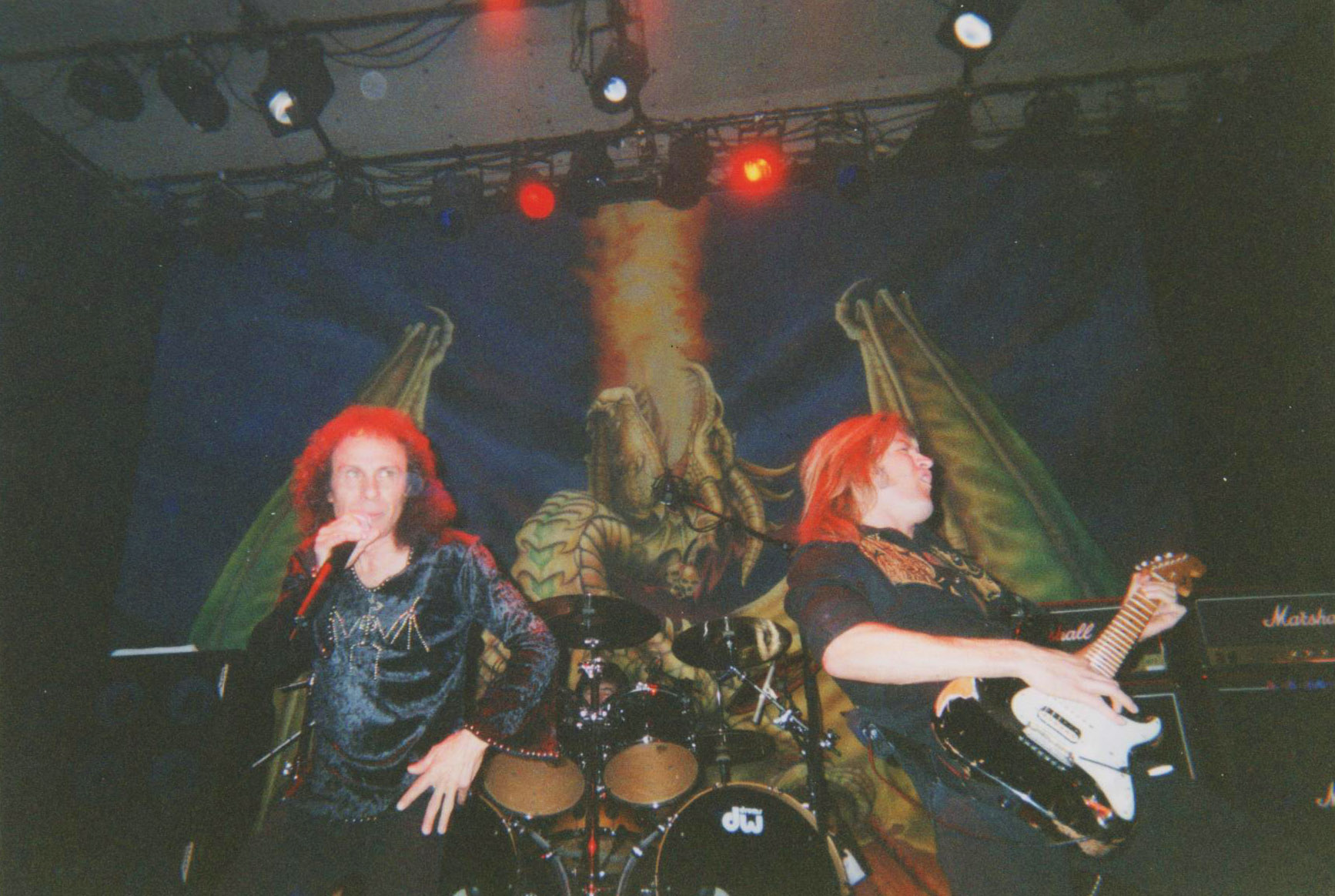
Dio performing in Paris, 2002

Craig Goldy's return facilitated the release of Dio's eighth studio album in 2000, Magica, which was regarded by many as the band's "comeback album" and reached No. 13 on the Billboard independent charts. It featured not only the return of Goldy but also of Simon Wright and Jimmy Bain, although on the European leg of the tour Chuck Garric played bass. Scott Warren remained in the band and performed live, although Dio and Bain handled all of the keyboard and synth on Magica. A concept album, Magica featured a return to the band's older, more successful sound, while increased use of keyboards gave it a more modern feel. During the following tour, however, tensions rose between Goldy on the one hand and Bain and Dio on the other, as Goldy was dealing with family obligations. Goldy left the band in January 2002 and was replaced with Doug Aldrich, who Bain had met while recording a tribute album for Metallica. Because of his late arrival, Aldrich did not contribute much to Dio's ninth work, Killing the Dragon, which was written primarily by Dio and Bain. Killing The Dragon was released in 2002 through Spitfire Records and was well received in the metal community, making the Billboard top 200. Aldrich would stay in the band until April of the following year, when he, like Campbell before him, joined Whitesnake, prompting Goldy's return. Soon afterward, Bain left the band.

=== Master of the Moon and split (2004–2010) ===
Dio released their tenth studio album, Master of the Moon on August 30, 2004, in Europe through SPV Records and on September 7, 2004, in the United States through Sanctuary Records. The album features multi-instrumentalist Jeff Pilson (formerly of Dokken) on bass duties; however, because of prior obligations with Foreigner, he was only available for the recording sessions, and so was replaced by Rudy Sarzo (formerly of Ozzy Osbourne, Quiet Riot, Whitesnake, Blue Öyster Cult among others) on the tour.

2005 saw the release of the Dio live album Evil or Divine – Live in New York City, which featured the same show that was released on DVD in 2003. Dio toured South America, Japan, Europe, and Russia in 2005. Their autumn tour was titled "An Evening With Dio" and featured a regular set, and then a second set of the band playing Holy Diver in its entirety. A DVD of the tour was filmed in London. The audio of this performance, a double CD named Holy Diver – Live was released in April 2006.

In 2007, it was announced that Black Sabbath would reunite with Dio and go under the name Heaven & Hell. The band released The Devil You Know in 2009.

Dio's involvement with Heaven & Hell delayed the recording of what was to be the follow-up to Master of the Moon, Magica II. The three-year hiatus was briefly interrupted for a 10 concert European mini-tour in May/June 2008, and was scheduled to be interrupted again in November/December 2009 with 22 concerts starting in the UK and ending in Germany. Doug Aldrich was to have filled in for Craig Goldy on guitar on these dates, who had other obligations. Dio intended to release a new single, entitled "Electra", to coincide with the tour. This would have been their first studio material in 5 years. The band also intended to record an album or two in 2010.

On November 18, 2009, the European tour was cancelled due to Dio's hospitalization. He had been diagnosed with stomach cancer, and was undergoing treatment. His manager and wife Wendy Dio thanked well-wishers and said "After he kills this dragon, Ronnie will be back on stage, where he belongs, doing what he loves best, performing for his fans."

On February 19, 2010, it was announced on Dio's official website that he would release a box set, entitled the Tournado Box Set, for limited purchase. The set includes the Killing the Dragon CD, Evil or Divine DVD (PAL format only), DVD bonus material, interviews, photo gallery, never-before-seen behind the scenes footage, promo video for the Killing the Dragon track "Push", exclusive Dio cards, and the bonus CD single "Electra" (which is the last song the band recorded), from the unfinished albums Magica II & Magica III.

=== Death of Ronnie James Dio ===
Dio died on May 16, 2010, of stomach cancer at the Texas Medical Center in Houston, Texas, at the age of 67.

On November 9, 2010, a posthumous live album was released. Titled Dio at Donington UK: Live 1983 & 1987, it features Dio's 1983 and 1987 appearances at the Monsters of Rock festival and showcases several songs from the Dio era of both Rainbow and Black Sabbath, in addition to songs from Dio's own catalogue.

When being interviewed by Classic Rock Magazine from the UK, Dio guitarist Craig Goldy stated "We were working on tracks for a new Dio album just before Ronnie died in May. And we did almost finish one song. Wendy [Dio, Ronnie's widow/manager] has been talking about reissuing [DIO's] 'Magica' album (originally released in 2000) with bonus tracks, including this one." Goldy goes on to say of the lyrics, that they were written by Dio when he was fighting cancer, and are "very emotional" and "hard to listen to without a lump at the back of your throat".

On March 18, it was announced that the surviving members of the final line-up of Dio would embark on a project with former Judas Priest front man Tim "Ripper" Owens under the moniker Dio Disciples. The project has been touring extensively since 2011.

In May 2012, former Dio guitarist Vivian Campbell, despite his long established feud with Dio, announced his intent to reunite the original Dio band for a potential series of shows. This would include himself, drummer Vinny Appice, bassist Jimmy Bain, and keyboardist Claude Schnell. This announced line-up would feature former Lynch Mob vocalist and The Offspring touring member Andrew Freeman stepping in for Dio, and would perform under the name Last in Line.

== Murray ==
Murray is the demonic-looking mascot of Dio who appears on several of Dio's album covers, including Holy Diver, The Last in Line and Dream Evil, as well as on some of their singles and compilation albums. He was also featured in the sets for live shows.

=== Holy Diver ===
Dio's first studio album, Holy Diver, from 1983, was the first to feature Murray on its cover. Murray appears to be a demon torturing a cleric, but Ronnie James Dio said that it is not necessarily clear which one is the monster and which one is the priest.

=== The Last in Line ===
Murray is also featured on Dio's second studio album, The Last in Line. On this cover, resurrected souls emerge from their graves on Judgment Day to find a gigantic Murray staring at them from the far horizon.

=== Dream Evil ===
Murray is not featured on Dio's third studio album, Sacred Heart, but is, for the last time in his original form, featured on the cover of Dream Evil. He is shown in the window of a bedroom with a child sleeping in a bed, while being haunted by several different spooky creatures. Murray's story is printed in the Dream Evil Tour book. The cover art of Dream Evil is a reference to one of the tracks on the album, "Faces in the Window" (the entire album's concept is fears and superstitions about the night and darkness).

== Legacy ==
In 2016, Loudwire ranked Dio the 15th greatest metal band of all time, calling their song "Holy Diver" genre defining.

Comedy rock duo Tenacious D released a song on their first album entitled "Dio", written as a tribute to Dio, which mocked him somewhat for being too old and stated that Tenacious D were going to take over his position as masters of heavy metal. Before playing the song live, Jack Black would typically speak about how Dio's tenure in Black Sabbath served as his inspiration to get into heavy metal. The duo appeared in the music video for Dio's song "Push", and he in turn appeared and sang in Tenacious D's comedy movie The Pick of Destiny.

The Dio patch on the denim jacket worn by Eddie Munson (played by Joe Quinn) in a season of the Netflix show Stranger Things is made using a t-shirt from Ronnie James Dio's personal estate. The show's costume designer, Amy Parris, in a Q&A posted on the Netflix website said, "He's (Munson) a fan of wizard metal, he's a fan of Dio. He's a fan of Metallica. Actually, Dio was a popular band in the '80s, and we reached out to the estate. His wife is in charge of his estate and offered to send us vintage T-shirts, which was such a dream."

The 1989 Nintendo Entertainment System video game Holy Diver was named after the band's song of the same title and incorporates the members of the band as its protagonists, despite not being licensed from the band.

The character Dio Brando, the main antagonist of the manga series JoJo's Bizarre Adventure is named after the band. This has two meanings, as both a reference to the band and to the Italian for "God", referencing the character's high self-esteem.

== Band members ==
Final lineup

- Ronnie James Dio – vocals, keyboards (1982–2010; his death)
- Craig Goldy – guitar, keyboards (1987–1989, 1999–2001, 2004–2005, 2006–2010)
- Simon Wright – drums, percussion (1989–1991, 1998–2010)
- Scott Warren – keyboards (1993–2010)
- Rudy Sarzo – bass (2004–2010)

=== Succeeding bands ===
Two groups of former members of Dio, Dio Disciples and Last in Line, have reunited independently to perform Dio songs.

==== Dio Disciples ====
Current members

- Simon Wright – drums (2011–present)
- Scott Warren – keyboards (2011–present)
- Bjorn Englen – bass, backing vocals (2012–present)
- Oni Logan – vocals (2012–present)
- Rowan Robertson – guitar (2013, 2026–present)
- Robin McAuley – vocals (2026–present)

Former members

- Craig Goldy – guitar (2011–2018)
- Tim "Ripper" Owens – vocals (2011–2014, 2016–2023)
- Rudy Sarzo – bass (2011)
- Toby Jepson – vocals (2011–2012)
- James LoMenzo – bass (2011–2012)
- Mark Boals – vocals (2013–?)
- Ira Black – guitar, backing vocals (2018–2026)
- Joey Belladonna – vocals (2024–2026)

Touring members

- Doro Pesch – vocals (2011)
- Vinny Appice – drums (2013/2014)
- Gonzo Sandoval – drums (2014)
- Joe Retta – vocals (2016)

==== Last in Line ====
Current members

- Vinny Appice – drums (2012–present)
- Vivian Campbell – guitar (2012–present)
- Phil Soussan – bass (2016–present)

Former members

- Jimmy Bain – bass (2012–2016; his death)
- Claude Schnell – keyboards (2012–2015)
- Erik Norlander – keyboards (2016–2018)
- Andrew Freeman – lead vocals (2012–2026)

== Discography ==
Studio albums

- Holy Diver (1983)
- The Last in Line (1984)
- Sacred Heart (1985)
- Dream Evil (1987)
- Lock Up the Wolves (1990)
- Strange Highways (1993)
- Angry Machines (1996)
- Magica (2000)
- Killing the Dragon (2002)
- Master of the Moon (2004)

Live albums

- Intermission (1986)
- Inferno: Last in Live (1998)
- Evil or Divine – Live in New York City (2003)
- Holy Diver – Live (2006)
- At Donington UK: Live 1983 & 1987 (2010)
- Finding The Sacred Heart: Live In Philly 1986 (2013)
- Live in London, Hammersmith Apollo 1993 (2014)

== Videography ==
- Live in Concert (VHS & Laserdisc, 1984)
- A Special from the Spectrum (VHS & Laserdisc, 1984)
- Sacred Heart "The Video" (VHS, 1986 – DVD, 2004)
- Time Machine (VHS, 1990)
- Evil or Divine: Live in New York City (DVD, 2003)
- We Rock (DVD) (DVD, 2005)
- Holy Diver: Live (DVD, 2006)
- Finding the Sacred Heart: Live in Philly 1986 (DVD & BD, 2013)
- Live in London: Hammersmith Apollo 1993 (DVD & BD, 2014)
