= Man on the Silver Mountain =

Single by Rainbow

from the album Ritchie Blackmore's Rainbow
- B-side: "Snake Charmer"
- Released: 17 October 1975
- Genre: Heavy metal; hard rock
- Length: 4:38
- Songwriters: Ritchie Blackmore, Ronnie James Dio
- Producers: Ritchie Blackmore, Ronnie James Dio, Martin Birch

"Man on the Silver Mountain" is a song by English-American rock band Rainbow, released as the first track of their 1975 debut studio album, Ritchie Blackmore's Rainbow. Written by Ritchie Blackmore and Ronnie James Dio, it was their debut single.

== Personnel ==
Rainbow

- Ritchie Blackmore – guitars, producer
- Ronnie James Dio – vocals, producer
- Gary Driscoll – drums
- Craig Gruber – bass
- Mickey Lee Soule – piano, Mellotron, Clavinet, organ

Production

- Martin Birch – producer, engineer, mixing

== Reception ==
Brad Sanders of The A.V. Club wrote that, although the song's lyrics are essentially meaningless, the way that Dio sings them "sounds awesome". After Dio's death, Rob Halford performed a cover of the song and said it "captures the things I personally love in metal tracks".

== Charts ==
Chart (1975/76)	Peak position
Australian (Kent Music Report)	81
