= The Last in Line (song) =

Single by Dio

from the album The Last in Line
- B-side: "Stand Up and Shout" (live) (EU) "One Night in the City" (Aus.)
- Released: June 11, 1984
- Recorded: 1984; Caribou Ranch, Colorado, US
- Genre: Heavy metal
- Length: 5:48
- Label: Vertigo
- Songwriters: Ronnie James Dio, Jimmy Bain, Vivian Campbell
- Producer: Ronnie James Dio

Dio singles chronology
"Rainbow in the Dark" (1983)	"The Last in Line" (1984)	"We Rock" (1984)

Alternative cover
- Pinkpop '84 festival cover

Music video
- "The Last in Line" on YouTube

"The Last in Line" is the third single released by heavy metal band Dio, appearing on their platinum-certified LP of the same name. It was Dio's only song to hit the Top 10 of Billboard's Album Rock Tracks.

Unlike the band's first two singles, this song was not released as a single in the UK, but rather in the Netherlands, Spain and Australia. There is also an alternate version in the Netherlands sold only at the Pinkpop '84 festival on June 11, 1984. The sleeve of this release was the same as the band's previous single, "Rainbow in the Dark", with the Pinkpop logo in the corner.

A music video was made for the single and was directed by Don Coscarelli, who is known for directing the horror film series Phantasm. The video features a teenage delivery boy who is tasked with a delivery to a building. Upon entering an elevator, it suddenly goes haywire and sends him to a fantastical dimension. He is then accosted by a cyborg and is enslaved with several other people and creatures to be tortured by various means (e.g. endlessly playing arcade games that electrocute the losers). At one point, the demon creature from the album cover (Murray, the mascot of the band) is seen as the slaves are being led to their fates. The horrified boy takes off back to the elevator and is accosted again by the same cyborg from earlier. Ronnie James Dio, who was seen performing the song with his band, intervenes and saves the boy, before being captured by the other cyborgs. The video ends with the boy making it back to the elevator and returning to his home world.

The song was covered by Tenacious D for the 2014 This Is Your Life tribute album. Their cover won the Grammy Award for Best Metal Performance.

== Charts ==
Chart (1984)	Peak position
US Mainstream Rock (Billboard)	10
