= Rainbow in the Dark =

Single by Dio

from the album Holy Diver
- B-side: "Stand Up and Shout (live), Straight Through the Heart (live)"
- Released: October 1983
- Recorded: 1983, Sound City Studios, Los Angeles, California
- Genre: Heavy metal; pop metal
- Length: 4:14
- Label: Vertigo (Europe), Warner Bros. Records (US/Canada)
- Composers: Ronnie James Dio, Vinny Appice, Jimmy Bain, Vivian Campbell
- Lyricist: Ronnie James Dio
- Producer: Ronnie James Dio

Dio singles chronology
"Holy Diver" (1983)	"Rainbow in the Dark" (1983)	"The Last in Line" (1984)

Music video
- "Rainbow in the Dark" on YouTube

"Rainbow in the Dark" is a song by heavy metal band Dio. Released from the band's double platinum-selling 1983 debut album, Holy Diver. Assisted by a popular MTV music video, it reached #14 on US Billboard Album Rock Tracks in early October.

The distinctive keyboard motif was composed by Jimmy Bain on a Yamaha keyboard.

The song was covered by Corey Taylor, with support from Roy Mayorga, Satchel, Christian Martucci and Jason Christopher for the Ronnie James Dio – This Is Your Life album. It was also covered by Norwegian band Jorn on their 2016 album Heavy Rock Radio.

The song was also featured in the 2019 San Diego Comic-Con reveal of Marvel Studios' Thor: Love and Thunder, and is featured in end credits of the film itself. The song is also featured in the 2024 absurdist anthology film Kinds of Kindness.

== Music video ==
The music video was filmed close to the time of the original studio recording of the song. The video's location takes place in central London, with scenes alternating between shots of a man following a woman through a street lined with freaky cinemas, and Ronnie James Dio singing from a rooftop. The implied malicious intent of the man is made evident during the guitar solo, when guitarist Vivian Campbell (and bassist Jimmy Bain) appear and effectively "scare" him away after he follows the woman into a moviehouse, with the woman kissing Campbell on the cheek in apparent gratitude. The video includes shots of tourist attractions such as Nelson's Column, Westminster Bridge, Piccadilly Circus, and Soho.

== Chart positions ==
Chart (1983)	Peak position
UK Singles (Official Charts)	46
US Mainstream Rock (Billboard)	14
