= Holy Diver (song) =

1983 single by Dio

Single by Dio

from the album Holy Diver
- B-side: "Evil Eyes"
- Released: August 12, 1983
- Recorded: 1983
- Studio: Sound City (Los Angeles)
- Genre: Heavy metal
- Length: 5:51
- Label: Warner Bros.
- Songwriter: Ronnie James Dio
- Producer: Ronnie James Dio

Dio singles chronology
"Holy Diver" (1983)	"Rainbow in the Dark" (1983)

Music video
- "Holy Diver" on YouTube

"Holy Diver" is a song by American heavy metal band Dio. It was released in August 1983 as the lead single from the band's debut album of the same name. Although it only reached number 40 on the Mainstream Rock chart at that time, it is one of Dio's most popular songs today.

== Reception ==
Following the September 11 attacks, the song was placed on the list of post-9/11 inappropriate titles distributed by Clear Channel.

In March 2023, Rolling Stone ranked "Holy Diver" as the 9th greatest metal song of all time.

== Content ==
Dio said the lyrics are about a Christ figure on another planet who sacrifices himself to redeem his people. When the people learn that he intends to leave them to save people on other planets, they selfishly ask him to stay.

== Music video ==
The music video for "Holy Diver", directed and edited by Arthur Ellis, features Dio as a sword wielding barbarian adventuring through a desolate church (the then recently burnt-out St Mark's Church, Silvertown in east London, which is now a music venue). Upon entering the church, Dio encounters a shrouded figure accompanied by hobgoblin servants. The shrouded figure brandishes an axe at Dio and Dio strikes the shrouded figure down. But instead of killing the figure and his servants, Dio turns them into rats. Later, Dio visits a blacksmith who is forging a sword. Dio throws his old sword away and deftly catches the newly forged one. Walking through a corridor, Dio encounters three hooded figures chained to a row of seats. As the camera pans across them, the third slowly raises its head to reveal eyes resembling those of a cat. The final shots show Dio exiting the church.

== Chart positions ==
Chart (1983)	Peak position
Sweden (Sverigetopplistan)	60
UK Singles (Official Charts)	72
US Mainstream Rock (Billboard)	40

== Killswitch Engage version ==
"Holy Diver"

Single by Killswitch Engage

from the album As Daylight Dies (Special Edition)
- Released: 17 August 2007
- Recorded: 2006
- Genre: Metalcore; heavy metal
- Length: 4:10
- Label: Roadrunner
- Songwriter: Ronnie James Dio
- Producers: Adam Dutkiewicz, Joel Stroetzel

Killswitch Engage singles chronology
"The Arms of Sorrow" (2007)	"Holy Diver" (2007)	"This Is Absolution" (2008)

Music video
- "Holy Diver" on YouTube

Killswitch Engage covered the song for the compilation High Voltage!: A Brief History of Rock for Kerrang! magazine. The song was later re-released for the special edition of As Daylight Dies. A live version of the song is also featured on the Special Edition of their 2009 album Killswitch Engage, then in 2014, the song was re-released on the compilation album entitled Ronnie James Dio This Is Your Life. This version of the song as well as the original composed by Dio are DLC for the guitar video game Rocksmith 2014.

=== Music video ===
The band released a music video for their version. Directed by Brian Thompson, the video features a comical take on Dio's original music video.

=== Reception ===
Metal Hammer commented on Killswitch Engage’s version of the song stating "This is a truly superb effort, that almost certainly introduced Ronnie’s work to a whole new generation of metal fans, and became the closing number in the bands set for many years."

Loudwire noted that "the group injects enough of their own flavor to make it feel distinctive" adding "Specifically, both the guitar work and Howard Jones’ voice are a bit fuller and dare I say more epic. Plus, Jones’ occasional screams, alongside the trickier guitar solo and elaborate percussion, add ferocity and complexity."

In 2011 NME included their version of "Holy Diver" on their list of the 10 best metal cover songs. In 2021 Classic Rock History ranked it at number 4 on their list of the 10 best Killswitch Engage songs.

=== Chart positions ===
Chart (2007)	Peak position
US Mainstream Rock (Billboard)	12

=== Personnel ===
Killswitch Engage

- Howard Jones – lead vocals
- Adam Dutkiewicz – lead and rhythm guitar, vocals, keyboards
- Joel Stroetzel – rhythm and lead guitar, backing vocals
- Mike D'Antonio – bass guitar
- Justin Foley – drums, percussion

=== Certifications ===
Region	Certification	Certified units/sales
United States (RIAA)	Gold	500,000^{‡}
^{‡} Sales+streaming figures based on certification alone.
