= List of Dio members =

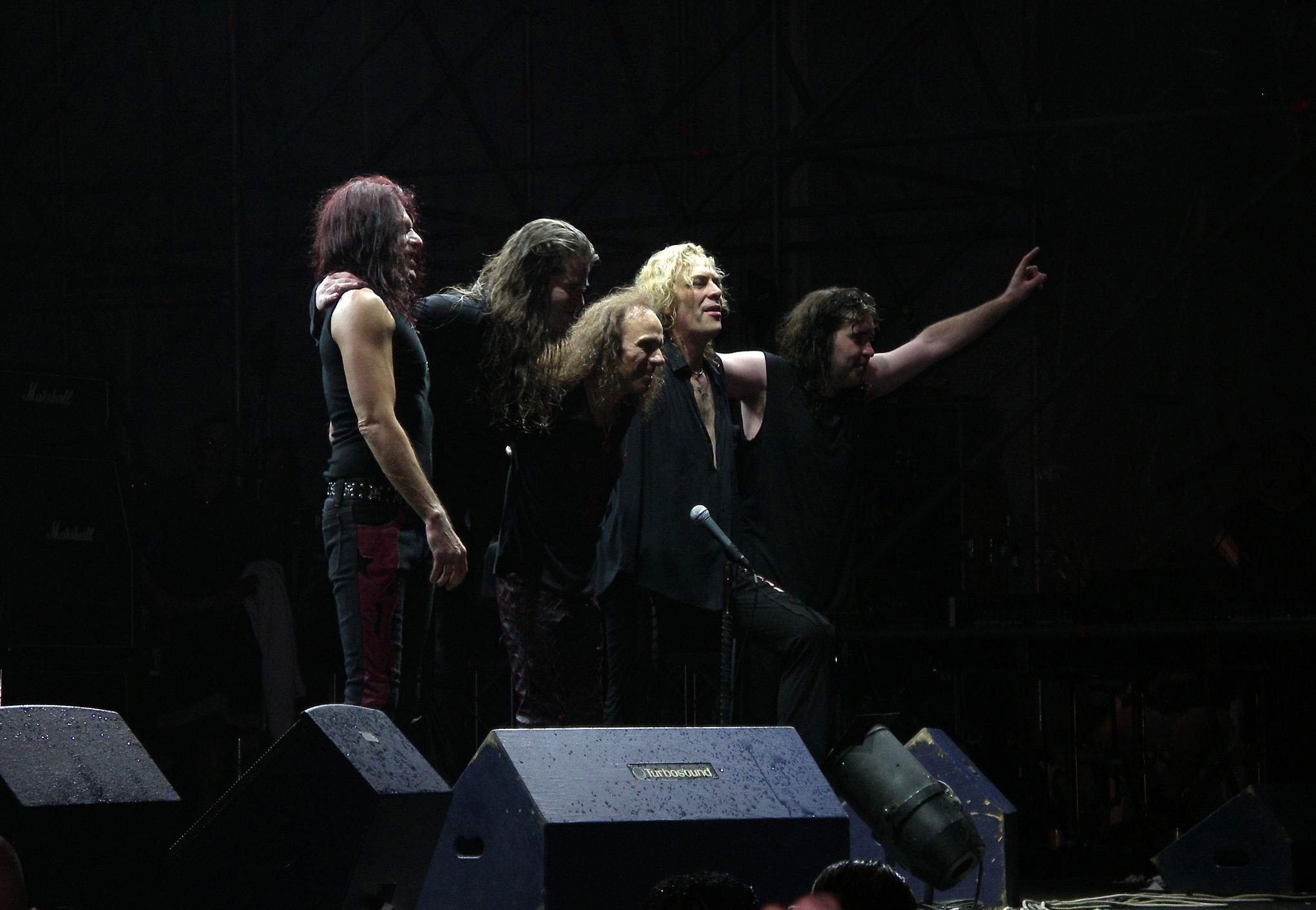
The final lineup of Dio, from left to right: Rudy Sarzo, Craig Goldy, Ronnie James Dio, Scott Warren and Simon Wright.

Dio was an American heavy metal band centred around vocalist Ronnie James Dio. Formed in 1982, the group originally consisted of Dio, guitarist Jake E. Lee (replaced by Vivian Campbell for the first active lineup of the band), bassist Jimmy Bain and drummer Vinny Appice. The band's final lineup, active until Dio's death on May 16, 2010, included guitarist Craig Goldy, drummer Simon Wright, keyboardist Scott Warren and bassist Rudy Sarzo.

== History ==
Dio was formed in October 1982 by vocalist Ronnie James Dio and drummer Vinny Appice following their departure from Black Sabbath. For the first lineup, the pair worked with Rough Cutt guitarist Jake E. Lee and former Wild Horses and Rainbow bassist Jimmy Bain for around six weeks, before parting ways with Lee due to stylistic differences. Preferring to work with British musicians, Dio asked Bain for suggestions of a replacement; he recommended Sweet Savage guitarist Vivian Campbell, and Campbell joined the group. Around the release of the band's debut Holy Diver in May 1983, Claude Schnell joined as Dio's first full-time keyboardist. After two more studio albums – The Last in Line and Sacred Heart – as well as live release Intermission, Campbell left the band in March 1986. He was replaced by former Giuffria guitarist Craig Goldy.

Goldy remained for just one new album, Dream Evil, before leaving Dio due to "musical differences" in August 1988. After "hundreds" of submissions from guitarists worldwide, Rowan Robertson was chosen as Goldy's replacement in May 1989. A few months later, Bain and Schnell were replaced by Teddy Cook and Jens Johansson, respectively. In December, Appice also left Dio, with Simon Wright leaving AC/DC to take his place early the next year. The new lineup recorded and released their only album Lock Up the Wolves in 1990. The following January, Dio returned to Black Sabbath.

By November 1992, Dio and Appice had left Black Sabbath for a second time. They reformed Dio and added new guitarist Tracy G and bassist Jeff Pilson early the following year, after initially working with original member Bain. After recording Strange Highways, the group returned to a five-piece with the addition of Scott Warren on keyboards. Pilson remained until the end of the album's tour in late 1994, when he rejoined Dokken, although he contributed to the 1996 release Angry Machines. Larry "Bones" Dennison replaced him for the next tour, which spawned the live release Inferno: Last in Live. In February 1997, Appice was replaced for a run of shows by James Kottak, after being hospitalised for pneumonia. He was also next to leave Dio permanently, when he toured with Black Sabbath from June 1998.

Appice was replaced, again, by Simon Wright. The following year, former members Goldy and Bain also returned. Again, Goldy only lasted one album – 2000's Magica – before he was replaced by Doug Aldrich in January 2002. The new guitarist recorded Killing the Dragon, but by early 2003 had left due to "scheduling conflicts" with his other group Whitesnake. Aldrich was originally set to be replaced by Ratt guitarist Warren DeMartini, however he was replaced within a month by the returning Goldy. Bain also left in early 2004. Pilson returned to perform on Master of the Moon, with former Ozzy Osbourne bassist Rudy Sarzo taking over on tour from July. Aldrich would later return to fill in for Goldy on tour in 2005 due to an arm injury, and again in 2009 due to scheduling conflicts with Budgie.

On May 16, 2010, Ronnie James Dio died of stomach cancer, marking the end of his eponymous band. All four other members went on to form Dio Disciples with former Judas Priest frontman Tim "Ripper" Owens in 2011, while original members Appice, Campbell, Bain and Schnell formed Last in Line with former Lynch Mob vocalist Andrew Freeman in 2012.

== Members ==
=== Official members ===
Image	Name	Years active	Instruments	Release contributions
	Ronnie James Dio (Ronald James Padavona)	1982–2010 (until his death)	vocals; keyboards	all releases
	Vinny Appice	1982–1989; 1992–1998	drums; percussion	all Dio releases from Holy Diver (1983) to Dream Evil (1987); Strange Highways (1993 Europe/Japan, 1994 US/Canada); Angry Machines (1996); Inferno: Last in Live (1998)
	Jimmy Bain	1982–1989; 1992–1993; 1999–2004 (died 2016)	bass; keyboards; guitar; backing vocals	all Dio releases from Holy Diver (1983) to Dream Evil (1987); Magica (2000); Killing the Dragon (2002); Evil or Divine – Live in New York City (2003)
	Jake E. Lee	1982	guitar	none
	Vivian Campbell	1982–1986	guitar	all Dio releases from Holy Diver (1983) to Intermission (1986); At Donington UK: Live 1983 & 1987 (2010)
	Claude Schnell	1983–1989	keyboards; piano	all Dio releases from The Last in Line (1984) to Dream Evil (1987); At Donington UK: Live 1983 & 1987 (2010); Finding the Sacred Heart: Live in Philly 1986 (2013)
	Craig Goldy	1986–1988; 1999–2002; 2003–2010	guitar; keyboards; bass	Intermission (1986); Dream Evil (1987); Magica (2000); Master of the Moon (2004); At Donington UK: Live 1983 & 1987 (2010); Finding the Sacred Heart: Live in Philly 1986 (2013)
	Rowan Robertson	1989–1991	guitar	Lock Up the Wolves (1990)
	Teddy Cook	1989–1991	bass; backing vocals	Lock Up the Wolves (1990)
	Jens Johansson	1989–1991	keyboards; piano	Lock Up the Wolves (1990)
	Simon Wright	1990–1991; 1998–2010	drums; percussion	Lock Up the Wolves (1990); Magica (2000); Master of the Moon (2004); Evil or Divine – Live in New York City (2003); Master of the Moon (2004); Holy Diver – Live (2006)
	Tracy G (Tracy Grijalva)	1993–1999	guitar	Strange Highways (1993 Europe/Japan, 1994 US/Canada); Angry Machines (1996); Inferno: Last in Live (1998); Live in London, Hammersmith Apollo 1993 (2014)
	Jeff Pilson	1993–1994; 1996–1997; 2004 (session)	bass; keyboards; guitar; backing vocals	Strange Highways (1993 Europe/Japan, 1994 US/Canada); Angry Machines (1996); Master of the Moon (2004); Live in London, Hammersmith Apollo 1993 (2014)
	Scott Warren	1993–2010	keyboards; piano	Angry Machines (1996); Inferno: Last in Live (1998); Killing the Dragon (2002) – "Before the Fall" only; Evil or Divine – Live in New York City (2003); Master of the Moon (2004); Holy Diver – Live (2006)
	Jerry Best	1995–1996	bass	none
	Larry "Bones" Dennison	1996–1999	bass	Inferno: Last in Live (1998)
	Chuck Garric	1999–2000	bass	none
	Doug Aldrich	2002–2003; 2005 (touring); 2009 (touring)	guitar	Killing the Dragon (2002); Evil or Divine – Live in New York City (2003); Holy Diver – Live (2006)
	Warren DeMartini	2003	guitar	none
	Rudy Sarzo	2004–2010	bass	Holy Diver – Live (2006)

=== Live substitutes ===
Image	Name	Years active	Instruments	Details
	James Kottak	1997 (died 2024)	drums	Kottak filled in for Vinny Appice during a tour in February 1997, when he was hospitalised for pneumonia.
	Bob Daisley	1998	bass	After Larry Dennison had to leave a tour early, Daisley took over for Scandinavian shows in late 1998.

== Lineups ==
Period	Members	Releases
October – November 1982	Ronnie James Dio – lead vocals, keyboards; Vinny Appice – drums; Jimmy Bain – bass, keyboards, backing vocals; Jake E. Lee – guitar	none
November 1982 – May 1983	Ronnie James Dio – lead vocals, keyboards; Vinny Appice – drums; Jimmy Bain – bass, keyboards, backing vocals; Vivian Campbell – guitar	Holy Diver (1983)
May 1983 – March 1986	Ronnie James Dio – lead vocals, keyboards; Vinny Appice – drums; Jimmy Bain – bass, backing vocals; Vivian Campbell – guitar; Claude Schnell – keyboards	The Last in Line (1984); Sacred Heart (1985); Intermission (1986) – live tracks; At Donington UK: Live 1983 & 1987 (2010)
March 1986 – August 1988	Ronnie James Dio – lead vocals; Vinny Appice – drums; Jimmy Bain – bass, backing vocals; Claude Schnell – keyboards; Craig Goldy – guitar	Intermission (1986) – studio track; Dream Evil (1987); At Donington UK: Live 1983 & 1987 (2010); Finding the Sacred Heart: Live in Philly 1986 (2013)
May – September 1989	Ronnie James Dio – lead vocals; Vinny Appice – drums; Jimmy Bain – bass, backing vocals; Claude Schnell – keyboards; Rowan Robertson – guitar	none
September – December 1989	Ronnie James Dio – lead vocals; Vinny Appice – drums; Rowan Robertson – guitar; Teddy Cook – bass, backing vocals; Jens Johansson – keyboards	none
January 1990 – January 1991	Ronnie James Dio – lead vocals; Rowan Robertson – guitar; Teddy Cook – bass, backing vocals; Jens Johansson – keyboards; Simon Wright – drums	Lock Up the Wolves (1990)
Band inactive January 1991 – November 1992
November 1992 – March 1993	Ronnie James Dio – lead vocals, keyboards; Vinny Appice – drums; Jimmy Bain – bass, keyboards, guitar, backing vocals	none
March – summer 1993	Ronnie James Dio – lead vocals, keyboards; Vinny Appice – drums; Jeff Pilson – bass, keyboards, guitar, backing vocals	none
Summer – November 1993	Ronnie James Dio – lead vocals; Vinny Appice – drums; Jeff Pilson – bass, keyboards, backing vocals; Tracy G – guitar	Strange Highways (1993)
November 1993 – October 1994	Ronnie James Dio – lead vocals, keyboards; Vinny Appice – drums; Jeff Pilson – bass, keyboards, backing vocals; Tracy G – guitar; Scott Warren – keyboards (session/touring)	Live in London, Hammersmith Apollo 1993 (2014)
August 1995 – May 1996	Ronnie James Dio – vocals, keyboards; Vinny Appice – drums; Tracy G – guitar; Jerry Best – bass; Scott Warren – keyboards (session/touring)	none
May – summer 1996	Ronnie James Dio – lead vocals, keyboards; Vinny Appice – drums; Tracy G – guitar; Jeff Pilson – bass, backing vocals; Scott Warren – keyboards (session/touring)	Angry Machines (1996)
November 1996 – May 1998	Ronnie James Dio – vocals, keyboards; Vinny Appice – drums; Tracy G – guitar; Larry Dennison – bass; Scott Warren – keyboards (session/touring)	Inferno: Last in Live (1998)
May 1998 – June 1999	Ronnie James Dio – vocals; Tracy G – guitar; Larry Dennison – bass; Simon Wright – drums; Scott Warren – keyboards (session/touring)	none
June – September 1999	Ronnie James Dio – vocals; Larry Dennison – bass; Simon Wright – drums; Craig Goldy – guitar, keyboards; Scott Warren – keyboards (session/touring)	none
September 1999 – January 2002	Ronnie James Dio – lead vocals, keyboards; Simon Wright – drums; Craig Goldy – guitar, keyboards; Jimmy Bain – bass, backing vocals; Scott Warren – keyboards (session/touring)	Magica (2000)
January 2002 – April 2003	Ronnie James Dio – lead vocals; Simon Wright – drums; Jimmy Bain – bass, backing vocals; Scott Warren – keyboards; Doug Aldrich – guitar	Killing the Dragon (2002); Evil or Divine – Live in New York City (2003)
April – May 2003	Ronnie James Dio – lead vocals; Simon Wright – drums; Jimmy Bain – bass, backing vocals; Scott Warren – keyboards; Warren DeMartini – guitar	none
May 2003 – March 2004	Ronnie James Dio – lead vocals; Simon Wright – drums; Jimmy Bain – bass, backing vocals; Scott Warren – keyboards; Craig Goldy – guitar	none
March – July 2004	Ronnie James Dio – vocals, bass; Simon Wright – drums; Scott Warren – keyboards; Craig Goldy – guitar, bass, keyboards; Jeff Pilson – bass (session)	Master of the Moon (2004)
July 2004 – May 2010	Ronnie James Dio – vocals; Simon Wright – drums; Scott Warren – keyboards; Craig Goldy – guitar; Rudy Sarzo – bass	Holy Diver – Live (2006) (with touring substitute Doug Aldrich)
