= The Very Beast of Dio =

Greatest hits album by Dio
- Released: October 3, 2000
- Genre: Heavy metal
- Length: 78:09
- Label: WEA/Rhino
- Producer: Ronnie James Dio

Dio compilations chronology
Dio: Master Series (1999)	The Very Beast of Dio (2000)	Anthology Vol.2 (2001)

Professional ratings
Review scores
Source	Rating
Allmusic	4.5/5 stars
The Rolling Stone Album Guide	2/5 stars

The Very Beast of Dio is the second greatest hits collection CD from the American heavy metal band Dio. The first to be released in the U.S., it has sold over 400,000 copies, according to SoundScan. As of 2009, it has been certified Gold by the RIAA, having sold more than 500,000 copies in the US.

A follow-up compilation, The Very Beast of Dio Vol. 2, was released on October 9, 2012.

== Track listing ==
No.	Title	Writer(s)	Original album	Length
1.	"Stand Up and Shout"	Ronnie James Dio, Jimmy Bain	Holy Diver	3:19
2.	"Holy Diver"	Dio	Holy Diver	5:54
3.	"Rainbow in the Dark"	Dio, Vivian Campbell, Bain, Vinny Appice	Holy Diver	4:16
4.	"Straight Through the Heart"	Dio, Bain	Holy Diver	4:36
5.	"We Rock"	Dio	The Last in Line	4:35
6.	"The Last in Line"	Dio, Campbell, Bain	The Last in Line	5:47
7.	"Mystery"	Dio, Bain	The Last in Line	3:58
8.	"King of Rock and Roll"	Dio, Campbell, Bain, Appice	Sacred Heart	3:52
9.	"Sacred Heart"	Dio, Campbell, Bain, Appice	Sacred Heart	6:28
10.	"Hungry for Heaven"	Dio, Bain	Sacred Heart	4:11
11.	"Rock 'n' Roll Children"	Dio	Sacred Heart	4:33
12.	"Man on the Silver Mountain (live)"	Ritchie Blackmore, Dio	Intermission	2:29
13.	"Dream Evil"	Dio, Craig Goldy	Dream Evil	4:29
14.	"I Could Have Been a Dreamer"	Dio, Goldy	Dream Evil	4:44
15.	"Lock Up the Wolves"	Dio, Rowan Robertson, Bain	Lock Up the Wolves	8:34
16.	"Strange Highways"	Dio, Appice, Tracy G, Jeff Pilson	Strange Highways	6:53

== Credits ==
- Ronnie James Dio - vocals, keyboards
- Vivian Campbell - guitars
- Craig Goldy - guitars on tracks 13, 14
- Rowan Robertson - guitars on track 15
- Tracy G – guitars on track 16
- Jimmy Bain - bass
- Teddy Cook - bass on track 15
- Jeff Pilson – bass, keyboards on track 16
- Vinny Appice - drums
- Simon Wright - drums on track 15
- Jason S Zwingelberg - Triangle
- Claude Schnell - keyboards
- Jens Johansson - keyboards on track 15

== Certifications ==
Region	Certification	Certified units/sales
United States (RIAA)	Gold	500,000^{^}
^{^} Shipments figures based on certification alone.
