= Last in Line =

British - American rock band

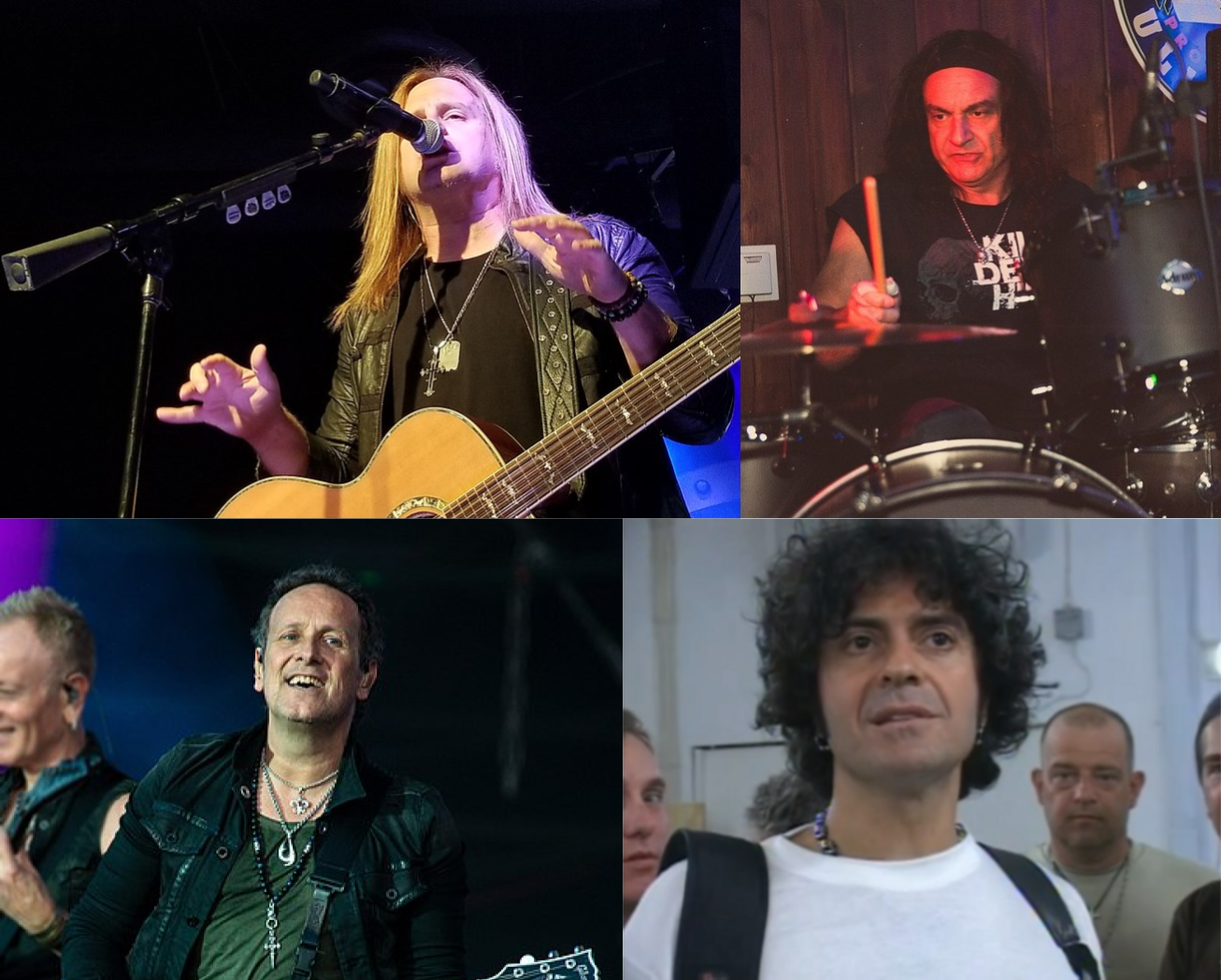
- (Clockwise from top left) Andrew Freeman, Vinny Appice, Phil Soussan and Vivian Campbell

Background information
- Origin: Belfast, Northern Ireland
- Genres: Hard rock, heavy metal
- Years active: 2012–present
- Labels: Frontiers earMUSIC
- Spinoff of: Dio
- Members: Vinny Appice; Vivian Campbell; Phil Soussan
- Past members: Jimmy Bain; Claude Schnell; Erik Norlander; Andrew Freeman
- Website: lastinlineofficial.com

Last in Line is a hard rock and heavy metal supergroup band originally formed in Belfast in 2012 by former members of Dio's original lineup. Their name comes from the 1984 Dio album, The Last in Line. Following the death of frontman Ronnie James Dio in 2010, drummer Vinny Appice, bassist Jimmy Bain, guitarist Vivian Campbell and keyboardist Claude Schnell reunited and added vocalist Andrew Freeman to perform the Dio songs they originally recorded. They released three studio albums of original material without Schnell (two without Bain) between February 2016 and March 2023.

== Dio origins ==
Former Black Sabbath members vocalist Ronnie James Dio and drummer Vinny Appice formed Dio in October 1982 in the United States with bassist Jimmy Bain and guitarist Vivian Campbell. The band released their debut album, Holy Diver in May 1983. Since Ronnie James Dio and Jimmy Bain had played keyboards on the record, they recruited keyboardist Claude Schnell for live shows in 1983 and the following Holy Diver tour. Claude Schnell later became a full member of Dio, and the band's first recorded effort as a quintet was 1984's The Last in Line. The band proceeded to release Sacred Heart in 1985 and The Dio E.P. in 1986 before Campbell was fired. The remaining members were joined by guitarist Craig Goldy to release Dream Evil in 1987 before the departure of Bain, Appice and Schnell. They did not play in Dio together again. Appice returned between 1993 and 1998 and Bain between 1999 and 2004.

== Formation and live performances (2012–2016) ==
After the death of Ronnie James Dio in 2010, Campbell set into motion the idea of reuniting the original members of Dio for the first time since his departure from the band in 1986. The idea came to fruition when he joined Appice, Bain and Schnell for a jam session with vocalist Andrew Freeman in February 2012. In May 2012, the group began performing live shows under the name Last in Line, named after the second album Dio released. They planned to play songs from the first three Dio albums: Holy Diver, The Last in Line and Sacred Heart. Rehearsals continued in the following weeks before Campbell had to re-join Def Leppard on their 2012 Rock of Ages Tour, which resumed in December.

The band's first public performance took place on August 3, 2013, at the Slidebar in Fullerton, California. Every song from Holy Diver was played in addition to five tracks from The Last in Line and two from Sacred Heart. The show was conceived as a warmup show for a four date tour of the United Kingdom starting in Campbell's hometown of Belfast, Northern Ireland on August 8 and continuing with three more shows in Britain over the next three days.

The band continued performances in the US with a show at the Vinyl, Las Vegas on October 8 as well as Ramona Mainstage in California on October 12. Campbell's former Sweet Savage bandmate Ray Haller filled in for Bain during the band's next performance at Loudpark Festival in Tokyo on October 20. During 2015, as Campbell continued his battle with Hodgkin's lymphoma, and during a 100 date tour with Def Leppard in support of their 2015 self-titled effort, Last in Line did not tour, instead they set about finishing the recording of their debut album Heavy Crown.

They joined Def Leppard on their Hysteria on the High Seas concert cruise from January 21–25, 2016, and played a pre-cruise show at Magic City Casino in Miami on January 20, debuting new songs from Heavy Crown with new keyboardist Erik Norlander. Due to bassist Jimmy Bain's onboard death, they played an abbreviated tribute set on the last day. A scheduled tour for spring 2016 was cancelled. After auditioning bass players, bassist Phil Soussan joined the group to fulfill a small set of booked shows in April and May.

== Heavy Crown (2015–2017) ==
Last in Line began recording tracks for a new album of original material in April 2014, followed by the release of a snippet of the new track Devil in Me in June. The album, produced by former Dio bassist Jeff Pilson, was announced to have an expected release date in early 2016. On November 10, 2015, it was announced that Schnell had left the band. The rest wanted to retrace their footsteps in recording Holy Diver as a four-piece before he joined Dio.

On November 17, the band released a music video for their premiere single Devil in Me, and announced that their debut album, Heavy Crown, would be released on February 20, 2016. On January 24, bassist Jimmy Bain died while on Def Leppard's Hysteria on the High Seas concert cruise promoting Heavy Crown. Following his death, the band recruited Phil Soussan as its new bassist, initially to complete the band's touring commitments but during those shows it became evident that there was a chemistry in the new line up and with it, an undeniable reason to continue the band forward toward a second album.

== II (2017–2020) ==
In March 2017, Campbell confirmed that the second album was "well underway" in an interview with Sirius XM. He stated that six songs had been written, and that the second album would be released in early 2018. The band had planned to finish it that year, but it had been pushed back due to members' existing commitments with Def Leppard. Foreigner bassist Jeff Pilson, the producer of the album, then announced it would be released sometime in 2019. The album's title was revealed as II in November 2018. The band now included seasoned bass player Phil Soussan for the recording of the album, which was released on February 22, 2019, via Frontiers.

The "II" album did very well and the band toured extensively in support of the record. Another tour of Europe opening for Saxon showed the band being very well received and in the enviable position of a classic rock band being able to gain traction with original material. The culmination of this tour was a slot at the prestigious Download Festival in the U.K. During that show it was decided to play a set of predominantly all original material as an experiment, the resulting performance giving a surge of confidence to the Last in Line concept, having been so exceptionally well received.

As with the rest of the industry, a heavy proposed touring schedule planned for 2020, including several major music festivals had to be canceled due to the COVID-19 pandemic.

== Jericho (2020–present) ==
In January 2020, the band recorded six tracks to form the basis for the new album, Jericho, released on March 31, 2023, via earMUSIC. "With Last in Line, just as we did with Dio, we cut the basic tracks live," Campbell said. "It's important for us to capture the energy of the syncopation of playing together in real-time, much like the energy of a live show. This record represents the best of both worlds: the spirit of an energetic band performance and the more reflective and nuanced qualities of our individual performances, too."

In 2022, Last in Line issued A Day in the Life, a limited-edition silver disc EP that featured the Beatles track of the same name. It was produced by Phil Soussan with each part recorded from each member's home. It included a preview track, "Hurricane Orlagh", from Jericho.

On April 5, 2026, it was announced the band had parted ways with Andrew Freeman and were searching for a new vocalist.

== Members ==
Current

- Vivian Campbell – guitar (2012–present)
- Vinny Appice – drums (2012–present)
- Phil Soussan – bass, backing vocals (2016–present), keyboards (studio only)

Former

- Andrew Freeman – lead vocals (2012–2026), piano (on II)
- Jimmy Bain – bass, backing vocals (2012–2016; his death)
- Claude Schnell – keyboards (2012–2015)
- Erik Norlander – keyboards (2015–2018)

Former touring

- Ray Haller – bass (2015)

== Discography ==
Studio albums

- Heavy Crown (2016)
- II (2019)
- Jericho (2023)

EPs

- A Day in the Life (2022)
