= II (Last in Line album) =

Studio album by Last in Line
- Released: February 20, 2019
- Studio: Pilsound Studios, Santa Clarita, CA; Jcat Studio, Las Vegas, NV
- Genre: Hard rock; heavy metal
- Length: 52:31 (International edition); 57:28 (Japanese edition)
- Label: Frontiers (International edition); Nexus and Seven Seas (Japanese edition)
- Producer: Jeff Pilson; Last in Line

Last in Line chronology
Heavy Crown (2016)	II (2019)

Singles from Last in Line
- 1. "Landslide" Released: November 28, 2018; 2. "Year of The Gun" Released: January 14, 2019; 3. "Blackout The Sun" Released: February 12, 2019

II is the second album by American rock supergroup Last in Line. It was released in Japan on February 20, 2019, and the international release on February 22, 2019, and produced by Jeff Pilson with the band. The first single, "Landslide" was released on November 28, 2018.

For this album, bass player Phil Soussan (ex-Ozzy Osbourne) replaced Jimmy Bain after his death at the age of 68 on January 23, 2016.

== Track listing ==
All songs written by Andrew Freeman, Vivian Campbell, Phil Soussan and Vinny Appice.

No.	Title	Length
1.	"Intro"	1:04
2.	"Black Out the Sun"	3:55
3.	"Landslide"	4:57
4.	"Gods and Tyrants"	4:57
5.	"Year of the Gun"	3:39
6.	"Give Up the Ghost"	4:45
7.	"The Unknown"	4:39
8.	"Sword from the Stone"	6:13
9.	"Electrified"	3:41
10.	"Love and War"	5:08
11.	"False Flag"	4:14
12.	"The Light"	5:15
Total length:		52:31

Japanese edition bonus track
No.	Title	Length
13.	"Landslide" (acoustic version)	4:17
Total length:		56:48

Japanese edition bonus DVD
No.	Title	Length
1.	"Landslide" (music video)	4:59
2.	"Last in Line II EPK video"	49:56

== Personnel ==
Last in Line

- Andrew Freeman - vocals, piano, producing, recording, mixing
- Vivian Campbell - guitar, producing
- Phil Soussan - bass guitar, keyboards, backing vocals, producing, mixing, mastering (track 13)
- Vinny Appice - drums, producing

Additional personnel

- Jacob Freeman - backing vocals
- Sarah Hester Ross - backing vocals
- Jeff Pilson - mellotron, backing vocals, producing, recording
- Chris Collier - recording, mastering, mixing
