= Appice =

Appice is a surname. Notable people with the surname include:

- Carmine Appice (born 1946), American drummer and percussionist
- Vinny Appice (born 1957), American rock drummer, brother of Carmine
