= Heavy Crown =

Heavy Crown may refer to:

- "Heavy Crown" (song), of 2014 by Rapper Iggy Azalea featuring Singer Ellie Goulding from the album Reclassified
- Heavy Crown (album), of 2016
- "Heavy Crown", a song by Trixie Mattel from the soundtrack of Trixie Mattel: Moving Parts
