= Redlynx (band) =

Italian hard rock band

- Origin: Turin, Italy
- Genres: Hard rock; blues rock; glam metal; heavy metal
- Years active: 1989–2002; 2012-2014; 2020–present
- Members: Chris Heaven; Pier Della Role
- Website: chris-heaven.com

Redlynx is an Italian hard rock band. The band was formed in 1989 by vocalist Chris Heaven (the only original member still in the band) and Balducci Brothers, Luca Balducci (who then moved to Brokenglazz) and Ricky Balducci. They recorded their first demo tape, "Go Out, Go Out", when drummer Elman Pavon joined the band. In the following years, with different changes within their ranks, the band recorded more demo tapes "My Heart Cries..." and "Slick Inside".

In 1997, Redlynx recorded their first full-length debut album Believe, released on Bax Records, gaining favorable reviews from various magazines (Metal Hammer, Hard!, Metal Shock and Flash) and embarking on their first national tour to support the release and introduce their new guitar player Christyan Simoes (ex-Viper).

In 1998, after the release of an acoustic EP Lonely and Looking for Your Heart, both on Bax Records, they released Tongue-Tied, a more blues rock oriented album. Embarking on their second national tour, while getting good reviews from their last work, the album gained recognition in Japan (where also Looking for Your Heart was released).

In 2001, vocalist Chris Heaven started a collaboration with Michael Von Knorring (Yngwie Malmsteen's drummer) recording with him different covers released on compilation albums. They joined forces with other musicians such as Tracy G (ex-Dio) and Rowan Robertson (ex-Dio). They also planned to release an original album but Knorring's health conditions prevented this to happen.

After the hiatus Redlynx got back together, in 2012, for a benefit concert "United For Emilia", to help the people after the earthquake that hit that region, in Collegno.

In 2020 the 'best of' album Fur and Claws - An Anthology, on Label Music, was released. It included some original songs: "Rock me Baby!" (with Japanese guitarist Yasu Matsushita) and "If I'd only known you before" (with late guitarist Massimo Arminchiardi).

In 2024, singer Chris Heaven releases an EP titled Black Rain with 6 new tracks after 22 years, completely free on every digital platform (Spotify, Bandcamp, YouTube, etc.).

== Discography ==
Studio Albums

- Believe (1997 Bax Records)
- Lonely (1997 Bax Records)
- Looking for Your Heart (1998 Bax Records)
- Soul Kiss (EP) (1998 Bax Records)
- Tongue-Tied (1998 Bax Records)
- Stone Groove (EP) (2000 Rainbow Music Rec)
- Get a Life! (2001 Vitaminic)
- Out of the Darkness (2002 Rainbow Music Rec)
- Fur and Claws - An Anthology (2020 LabelMusic)
- Black Rain (2024 BandCamp/YouTube etc.)
