= Rowan Robertson =

English rock guitarist

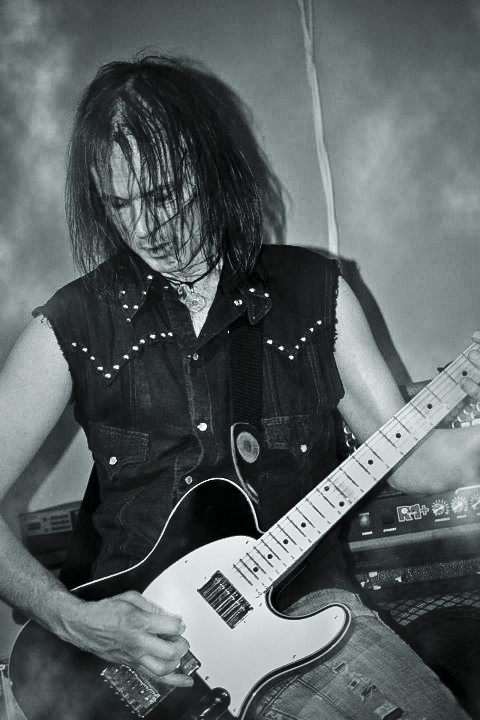

Background information
- Born: 22 November 1971 (age 54); Cambridge, Cambridgeshire, England
- Genres: Hard rock, heavy metal
- Occupations: Musician, songwriter
- Instruments: Guitar, vocals
- Years active: 1990–present

Rowan Wingate Robertson (born 22 November 1971) is an English rock guitarist who currently performs in the Las Vegas production show Raiding the Rock Vault and plays for Bang Tango. He also plays for DC4. Robertson also played guitar for AM Radio, Dio, Vast, and Violet's Demise. Robertson has also done work as a film composer for director Amber Moelter's Dirty Step Upstage and has filmed numerous instructional guitar videos.

== Career ==
=== Dio (1989–1991) ===
Rowan Robertson was recruited to join the band Dio when he was only 17 years of age. The experience launched the young guitarist from obscurity to international fame nearly overnight. News that the band Dio had replaced departing guitarist Craig Goldy with an unusually young guitar player circulated in hard rock and heavy metal magazines such as Hit Parader, Rip, and Circus months before Robertson's first and only album with the band, Lock Up the Wolves, was released.

==== Recruitment, audition, announcement ====
As a Dio fan himself, Robertson became aware of Craig Goldy's departure from Dio after the band's Dream Evil album and subsequent tour. Robertson began an earnest effort to make contact with the band's management, asking for a chance to audition. His initial effort was unsuccessful. After reaching out to the band's label, Phonogram Records, (not long after seeing Dio with Craig Goldy on guitars live at the Monsters of Rock festival at Donington Castle, in the UK, in 1987), Robertson received a generic-in-nature response declining his request for a personal audition. Robertson persisted and reached out to Dio's official fan club, hoping to reach someone closer to and with stronger personal ties to the band's management. The latter effort proved successful. The band's fan club forwarded Robertson's demo, this time leading to an audition. At the beginning of 1989 Robertson was flown to Los Angeles for a formal audition with Ronnie James and Wendy Dio. A second audition led to an offer and an official announcement that Robertson was now the band's official new guitarist. Members of the press were invited to meet the new guitar player at Oliver's Pub, in New York City on 20 July 1989. Between the Oliver's Pub event and the release of Lock Up the Wolves, media focus on the new guitar player was significant.

==== Lock Up the Wolves ====
Lock Up the Wolves sessions initially included Jimmy Bain, Vinny Appice and Jens Johansson. This line-up had already written and recorded parts of Lock Up the Wolves before Bain and Appice were replaced with Teddy Cook and former AC/DC drummer Simon Wright, respectively. The album was released on 15 May 1990, and the band embarked on a tour in support of the album.

In 1990 and 1991 the music industry experienced a dramatic shift as grunge became dominant in rock music: Soundgarden, Alice in Chains, Screaming Trees, were all signed to major labels and performed well commercially.

==== Second album with Dio shelved ====
Robertson's tenure in Dio was cut short by music industry persistence for a Ronnie James Dio reunion with Black Sabbath. In 1991 it was announced that the reunion would take place. At that time, the Dio band, including Robertson, had been writing songs for an upcoming album that had been scheduled for a May 1991 release. Once a Black Sabbath reunion with Ronnie James Dio was announced, what would have been Robertson's second album with Dio was shelved. Robertson has confirmed the existence of rehearsal recordings for what would have been the follow-up to Lock Up the Wolves but he has stated these will remain archived and he does not feel comfortable releasing any of this to the public, maintaining he would have only done that with permission from Ronnie James Dio himself.

A reunion nearly took place in 2001 when Robertson was scheduled to replace Craig Goldy on tour in South Africa in support of Dio's then-new album Magica after Goldy suffered an injury. However the September 11 attacks affected the band's tour plans. A second stint for Robertson in Dio never materialised.

=== After Dio (1991–present) ===
When Dio was put on ice due to the Ronnie James Dio-Black Sabbath reunion, Rowan Robertson began pursuing two new projects: work on an instruction video for guitar players and a new band called Violets Demise with vocalist Oni Logan (formerly of Lynch Mob) and drummer Jimmy Paxson. They recorded an album for Atlantic Records, but it was not released by the label at that time. Atlantic Records eventually released the album – titled Revisited – in 2002 under a different band name: Logan-Robertson. After Violet's Demise, Robertson spent three years doing session work in Los Angeles, as well as some work in Japan, where he toured briefly.

Robertson then worked with the VAST (Visual Audio Sensory Theater), founded and fronted by Jon Crosby, on the tour supporting the project's first album. VAST took a theatrical approach to performances. Although Robertson played live with the band after they had released their first album and he contributed to the development of the second VAST release, Music for People, he parted ways with VAST due to creative differences. Much of the work Robertson contributed to VAST was on rhythm guitars.

Robertson continued working with Violet's Demise's Oni Logan – a collaboration that would eventually pave the way for the release of Violet's Demise's debut album, which had been shelved years earlier. Around the same time, Robertson became the guitarist for pop-punk band AM Radio. The band's first full-length album, produced by Rivers Cuomo, Radioactive, was released on Elektra in 2003. It included the singles "Taken for a Ride" and "I Just Wanna Be Loved." "I Just Wanna Be Loved" was featured on the WB television series Smallville and released on the show's soundtrack. Also in 2003, "Taken for a Ride" was featured on the video game soundtrack for EA Sports' John Madden Football 2003. The band received more support from WB when "Taken for a Ride" was featured on an episode of One Tree Hill. The song also appeared on a television trailer for the FOX feature film The Girl Next Door that same year.

One of Robertson's more obscure projects was a band called Happy Birthday. In April 2005 Robertson embarked on a short West Coast tour with Happy Birthday, supporting Jimmy Chamberlin's band, The Jimmy Chamberlin Complex.

In 2005 Robertson also began collaboration on a project called Wicked Outlaw. "The new band, featuring guitarist Rowan Robertson and Finnish composer and bassist Marko Pukkila (formerly of Altaria)," was "writing original material" and was expected to debut and tour the United States and Europe in 2006 according to Blabbermouth.net. Initial gestures to organise Wicked Outlaw actually dated back to as early as May 2004.

DC4 originally featured Shawn Duncan (of Odin) on drums, Matt Duncan on bass, and Jeff Duncan (of Armored Saint and Odin) on vocals and guitar. DC4 released their debut album, Volume 1, with guitarist Hyland Church in 2002. Rowan joined the band in 2006 as a replacement for Church and featured on the band's second album, Explode, in 2007. Robertson also appeared on their third album, Electric Ministry in 2011.

As of 2014, Rowan Robertson is a member of Bang Tango.

== Other work ==
Since May 2011, Rowan Robertson has served as a columnist for Intense Guitar and Bass magazine. He has also teamed up with longtime Black Sabbath keyboardist Geoff Nicholls, along with Nils Patrik Johansson and others in a band called The Southern Cross. The band focuses on Black Sabbath and Dio material.

== Discography ==
=== With Dio ===
- Lock Up the Wolves (1990)

=== With DC4 ===
- Explode (2007)
- Electric Ministry (2011)
- Atomic Highway (2018)

=== With Ian Ray Logan & Serpent's Ride ===
- Between Lights and Shadows (2016)

== Videography ==
- Star Licks Master Sessions: Simon Wright (2000)
- Star Licks: Speed Picking
- Star Licks Master Sessions: Rowan Robertson
- Rowan Robertson: Speed Picking

== Filmography ==
- Dirty Step Upstage (Film Score) (2009)
