= Hungry for Heaven =

Single by Dio

from the album Sacred Heart
- B-side: "King of Rock and Roll" (UK) "Hide in the Rainbow" (re-issue)
- Released: October 4, 1985; May 9, 1986 (re-issue)
- Recorded: Rumbo Studios, Los Angeles, California, USA
- Genre: Heavy metal
- Length: 4:10
- Label: Vertigo
- Songwriters: Ronnie James Dio, Jimmy Bain
- Producer: Ronnie James Dio

Dio singles chronology
"Rock 'N' Roll Children" (1985)	"Hungry for Heaven" (1985)	"Dio Live" (1985)

Alternative cover
- International version

"Hungry for Heaven" is the seventh single released by heavy metal band Dio. It was the second single from their 1985 LP Sacred Heart, although it was originally written for the movie Vision Quest, appearing both in the film and on the associated soundtrack album.

Many different versions of the single exist; the original UK release had the B-side songs "King of Rock and Roll" and a live version of "Like the Beat of a Heart". An international version, however, had live versions of the songs "Holy Diver" and "Rainbow in the Dark" on the B-side, with a different sleeve design. The Australian release featured "The Last in Line" on the B-side.

The single peaked at #30 on the Billboard Top Album Tracks chart. A different version of this song also made an appearance in the 1985 movie Vision Quest.

The song's main guitar riff was heavily inspired by The Who's song "Baba O'Riley".

In the music video, Ronnie James Dio makes this introduction speech: "Greetings my children, come with me now and discover the magic that lies beyond the sea of dreams, and if you have the courage to cross the rainbow bridge, you may find the Sacred Heart".

== Chart performance ==
Chart (1985)	Peak position
UK Singles (Official Charts)	72
US Mainstream Rock Airplay (Billboard)	30
