= Derringer (album) =

Studio album by Derringer
- Released: 1976
- Studio: The Hit Factory, New York City
- Genre: Hard rock
- Length: 39:09
- Label: Blue Sky Records
- Producer: Rick Derringer

Derringer chronology
Derringer (1976)	Live in Cleveland (1976)

Professional ratings
Review scores
Source	Rating
AllMusic	3/5 stars
Christgau's Record Guide	B−
The Encyclopedia of Popular Music	2/5 stars
The Rolling Stone Album Guide	2.5/5 stars

Derringer is an album by Derringer, released in 1976 on Blue Sky Records.

== Track listing ==
1. "Let Me In" (Rick Derringer, Cynthia Weil) – 3:31
2. "You Can Have Me" (Derringer, Weil) – 4:23
3. "Loosen Up Your Grip" (Derringer) – 6:39
4. "Envy" (Derringer, Larry Sloman) – 4:40
5. "Comes a Woman" (Derringer, Weil) – 5:29
6. "Sailor" (Danny Johnson) – 4:25
7. "Beyond the Universe" (Derringer) – 5:50
8. "Goodbye Again" (Derringer, Weil) – 4:08

== Personnel ==
Derringer

- Rick Derringer – vocals, guitar
- Danny Johnson – guitar, vocals
- Kenny Aaronson – bass, background vocals
- Vinny Appice – drums

Additional personnel

- Edgar Winter – piano on "Goodbye Again"
- Maeretha Stewart, Ray Simpson, Tasha Thomas – vocals on "Envy"
- Harry Maslin – engineer
