= Heavy Crown (album) =

Studio album by Last in Line
- Released: February 19, 2016
- Studio: Pilsound Studios, Santa Clarita, California
- Genre: Heavy metal
- Length: 51:56
- Label: Frontiers
- Producer: Jeff Pilson

Last in Line chronology
Heavy Crown (2016)	II (2019)

Singles from Last in Line
- 1. "Devil in Me" Released: November 17, 2015; 2. "Martyr" Released: December 14, 2015; 3. "Starmaker" Released: January 15, 2016; 4. "Blame It on Me" Released: January 25, 2016

Heavy Crown is the debut album by British/American supergroup Last in Line. It was released on February 19, 2016. Its lead single, "Devil in Me", was released on November 17, 2015. The album was produced by bass player Jeff Pilson and co-written by the four band members.

This was the last album on which Jimmy Bain played bass before his death on January 23, 2016, less than a month prior to the album's release.

The young boy on the cover is Andrew Freeman's son Jacob.

== Track listing ==
No.	Title	Length
1.	"Devil in Me"	4:51
2.	"Martyr"	2:42
3.	"Starmaker"	5:03
4.	"Burn This House Down"	3:55
5.	"I Am Revolution"	3:00
6.	"Blame It on Me"	6:33
7.	"In Flames" (Bonus Track)	2:57
8.	"Already Dead"	3:35
9.	"Curse the Day"	4:52
10.	"Orange Glow"	4:41
11.	"Heavy Crown"	3:56
12.	"The Sickness"	5:51
Total length:		51:56

== Personnel ==
Last in Line

- Andrew Freeman – vocals
- Vivian Campbell – guitar
- Jimmy Bain – bass
- Vinny Appice – drums
