= Andrew Freeman (musician) =

American singer and guitarist

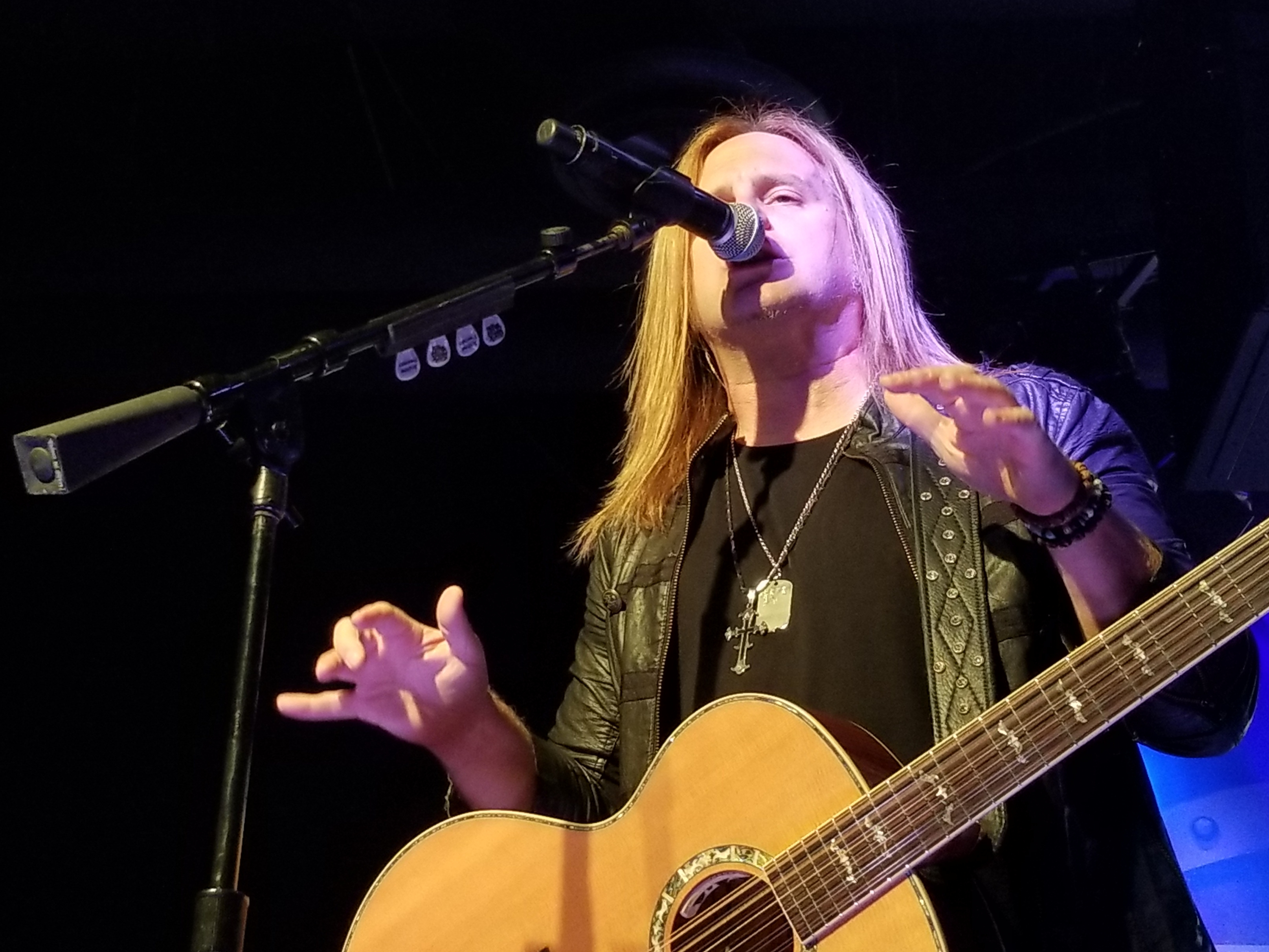
- Freeman with Raiding the Rock Vault in 2018

Background information
- Genres: Hard rock; heavy metal; punk rock
- Occupations: Singer; musician
- Instruments: Vocals; guitar
- Member of: Last in Line, Electric Temple
- Formerly of: The Offspring; Lynch Mob; Hurricane; Raiding The Rock Vault; Great White

Andrew Freeman is an American rock singer and guitarist who has played for a number of bands, including hard rock guitarist George Lynch's Lynch Mob and hard rock supergroup Last in Line, composed of former members of Dio.

== Career ==
Freeman was the guitarist and co-songwriter/producer for the Massachusetts band Thirty Stones, whose album Canvas, produced by Chris "Zeuss" Harris, peaked at number 5 on FMQB's Metal Detector and CMJ Crucial Spins. The band performed more than 250 concerts in 2003, appearing with bands such as Sevendust, Staind, Shadows Fall, Powerman 5000, Dope, Nonpoint, Hed PE, and Lacuna Coil, among others. Thirty Stones were also featured on several compilation CDs released by Cleopatra Records. The band reformed at the end of 2010, appearing on the cover of The Valley Advocate and performing a few shows in Massachusetts and California.

Freeman joined punk band the Offspring as a touring guitarist and backup vocalist on their 2008 tour for the album Rise and Fall, Rage and Grace. In 2010, Freeman joined Hurricane as the lead vocalist, performing a few shows with the band before leaving in 2013.

In 2012, after the death of Ronnie James Dio, Freeman joined the original members of Dio as a vocalist to form the band Last in Line, a supergroup featuring Vivian Campbell (Def Leppard, Whitesnake), Vinny Appice (Black Sabbath) and Jimmy Bain (Rainbow). Last In Line released their first album, Heavy Crown in 2016 and reached number 1 on Billboard’s "Heat Seeker" chart. Their follow-up album, "II" was released in 2019. Their third album, Jericho was released in 2022.

In early 2013, Freeman joined the show Raiding the Rock Vault in Las Vegas, where he performed six shows a week with other rock musicians. In late October 2018, he left Raiding the Rock Vault after performing over 1,000 shows.

Freeman has performed on three tours as the lead vocalist with Dokken and Lynch Mob guitarist George Lynch, including a feature on The Tonight Show with Jay Leno, and a headline show at the Musicians Institute in Hollywood, California.

In 2018, Freeman started performing as the vocalist for Lies, Deceit & Treachery with Jimmy D'Anda, Mick Sweda, and Lonnie Vencent, all of whom are formerly of Bullet Boys. He also formed a band called "Devil's Hand" with guitarist Mike Slamer, and in December of the same year, they released a self-titled album.

Freeman has also worked as a voice-over actor for Nickelodeon, and performed bit parts and audio post-production for the shows KaBlam! and Doug. He has also done various commercials for radio, television, film, and as a music producer and audio engineer.

During July–October 2021, Freeman filled in for Firehouse vocalist, CJ Snare, as Snare recovered from abdominal surgery.

On May 31, 2022, Freeman was officially announced as the lead vocalist for Great White, replacing Mitch Malloy. On October 21, 2022, Great White announced that Brett Carlisle was their new singer, due to Freeman's commitments with Last In Line.
