= Intermission (Dio album) =

Live album by Dio
- Released: June 2, 1986
- Recorded: December 6, 1985
- Venues: San Diego Sports Arena, San Diego, California studio track at Amigo Studios and Record Plant, Los Angeles
- Genre: Heavy metal
- Length: 34:20
- Labels: Warner Bros. (North America); Vertigo (rest of the world)
- Producer: Ronnie James Dio

Dio chronology
Sacred Heart (1985)	Intermission (1986)	Dream Evil (1987)

Professional ratings
Review scores
Source	Rating
AllMusic	2.5/5 stars
Collector's Guide to Heavy Metal	6/10
Kerrang!	4/5 stars

Intermission is the first live album released by the American heavy metal band Dio in 1986 on the label Vertigo Records in Europe and Warner Bros. Records in North America. The live songs were recorded with guitarist Vivian Campbell during the first leg of the Sacred Heart tour. Craig Goldy replaced Campbell in mid-tour, and the band wanted something to represent the new line-up, so they recorded the song "Time to Burn" in the studio with him, which was added to this album.

The band was featured on many radio-broadcasts but fans who had hoped for a double live album were somewhat disappointed with this release, especially as the guitar parts of the now-departed Campbell seemed low in the mix.

The original UK release came with a postcard-pack.

In 2012, the album was included as bonus tracks on the deluxe edition of Sacred Heart.

== Track listing ==
All lyrics are written by Ronnie James Dio, music as stated.

Side one
No.	Title	Music	Length
1.	"King of Rock and Roll"	Dio, Vinny Appice, Jimmy Bain, Vivian Campbell	3:41
2.	"Rainbow in the Dark"	Dio, Appice, Bain, Campbell	4:42
3.	"Sacred Heart"	Dio, Appice, Bain, Campbell	6:23

Side two
No.	Title	Music	Length
4.	"Time to Burn"	Dio, Appice, Bain, Craig Goldy, Claude Schnell	4:26
5.	"Rock 'n' Roll Children" / "Long Live Rock 'n' Roll" / "Man on the Silver Mountain"	Dio / Ritchie Blackmore, Dio / Blackmore, Dio	9:40
6.	"We Rock"	Dio	4:54

== Personnel ==
Dio

- Ronnie James Dio – vocals
- Vivian Campbell – guitar solos
- Craig Goldy – guitar on "Time to Burn", over-dubbed rhythm guitar on the live tracks
- Jimmy Bain – bass
- Claude Schnell – keyboards
- Vinny Appice – drums

== Charts ==
Chart (1986)	Peak position
Australian Albums (Kent Music Report)	57
Canada Top Albums/CDs (RPM)	85
Finnish Albums (The Official Finnish Charts)	23
German Albums (Offizielle Top 100)	63
UK Albums (Official Charts)	22
US Billboard 200	70
