= Sacred Heart (Dio album) =

- Cover art by Robert Florczak

Studio album by Dio
- Released: August 12, 1985
- Studio: Rumbo Recorders (Los Angeles)
- Genre: Heavy metal
- Length: 38:50
- Labels: Warner Bros. (North America); Vertigo (rest of the world)
- Producer: Ronnie James Dio

Dio chronology
The Last in Line (1984)	Sacred Heart (1985)	Intermission (1986)

Singles from Sacred Heart
- 1. "Rock 'n' Roll Children" Released: July 1985; 2. "Hungry for Heaven" Released: October 1985

Professional ratings
Review scores
Source	Rating
AllMusic	2.5/5 stars
Collector's Guide to Heavy Metal	8/10
The Rolling Stone Album Guide	1/5 stars

Sacred Heart is the third studio album by American heavy metal band Dio and the last to feature guitarist Vivian Campbell. It was released on August 12, 1985, on Warner Bros. Records in North America, and Vertigo elsewhere. The record peaked at No. 29 on the Billboard 200 chart. It includes the singles "Rock 'n' Roll Children" and "Hungry for Heaven".

== Overview ==
Sacred Heart was the final Dio album to include original guitarist Vivian Campbell, who was fired midway through the album's tour. Campbell went on to join Whitesnake and later Def Leppard. A serious rift developed between the guitarist and vocalist Ronnie James Dio during the recording of Sacred Heart, with Dio stating in an interview "...for me, (Campbell) wasn't even there for this record." When the band was formed, Dio had made an arrangement with his new band which saw them paid very little, but they were promised a larger piece of the pie beginning with their third album, which ended up being Sacred Heart. Campbell has maintained over the years that Dio failed to follow through on that promise, and his unhappiness with the situation drove a wedge between the two.

Dio had recently separated from his wife and manager Wendy Dio, and Campbell has stated that this personal turmoil resulted in the vocalist's demeanor in the studio becoming "really, really dark" during the recording of Sacred Heart. As a result, the musicians were uncomfortable in the studio and would typically leave after recording their parts, and the band began to fall apart.

The album, along with Holy Diver and The Last in Line, was released in a new 2-CD Deluxe Edition on March 19, 2012 through Universal for worldwide distribution outside the U.S. Clocking in at 38 minutes, Sacred Heart is the band's shortest album.

== Tour ==
The accompanying stageshow was a spectacle involving a mechanised dragon and laser effects, as captured on the VHS (and later DVD reissue) Sacred Heart "The Video". Ronnie James Dio and his band referred to the dragon as Dean (although the press renamed it “Denzil”).

== Cover ==
The cover art is by Robert Florczak. The inscription around the border of the cover is in Latin and reads FINIS PER SOMNIVM REPERIO TIBI SACRA COR VENEFICVS OSTIVM AVRVM. A possible rendering is Along the borders of dreams I found for you the sacred poisonous heart and golden door. More data useful for the interpretation could be contained within the lyrics to the song "Sacred Heart". Since Latin relies on context for a translation the inscription could translate as follows, "comes the end by sleep I will prepare the sacred heart which is the magic that opens upon the altar".

== Certifications ==
The RIAA certified Sacred Heart Gold (500,000 units sold) on October 15, 1985. It was Dio's last album to receive this certification until November 3, 2009, when the 2000 compilation The Very Beast of Dio was certified gold.

== Track listing ==
All lyrics are written by Ronnie James Dio, music as stated.

Side one
No.	Title	Music	Length
1.	"King of Rock and Roll"	Dio, Vinny Appice, Jimmy Bain, Vivian Campbell	3:49
2.	"Sacred Heart"	Dio, Appice, Bain, Campbell	6:27
3.	"Another Lie"	Dio	3:48
4.	"Rock 'n' Roll Children"	Dio	4:32

Side two
No.	Title	Music	Length
5.	"Hungry for Heaven"	Dio, Bain	4:10
6.	"Like the Beat of a Heart"	Dio, Bain	4:24
7.	"Just Another Day"	Dio, Campbell	3:23
8.	"Fallen Angels"	Dio, Appice, Bain, Campbell	3:57
9.	"Shoot Shoot"	Dio, Appice, Bain, Campbell	4:20

Deluxe edition disc two
No.	Title	Music	Original release	Length
1.	"Hide in the Rainbow"	Dio	Iron Eagle soundtrack	3:56
2.	"We Rock"	Dio	live B-Side of "Rock 'n' Roll Children" 12'	4:49
3.	"The Last in Line"	Dio, Bain, Campbell	live B-Side of "Rock 'n' Roll Children" 12'	5:17
4.	"Like the Beat of a Heart"	Dio, Bain	live B-Side of "Hungry for Heaven" 12'	5:14
5.	"King of Rock and Roll"	Dio, Appice, Bain, Campbell	Intermission (1986)	3:41
6.	"Rainbow in the Dark"	Dio, Appice, Bain, Campbell	Intermission	4:42
7.	"Sacred Heart"	Dio, Appice, Bain, Campbell	Intermission	6:27
8.	"Time to Burn"	Dio, Appice, Bain, Craig Goldy, Claude Schnell	Intermission	4:24
9.	"Medley: "Rock 'n' Roll Children" "Long Live Rock 'n' Roll" "Man on the Silver Mountain"	Dio; Ritchie Blackmore, Dio; Blackmore, Dio	Intermission	9:40
10.	"We Rock"	Dio	Intermission	4:58

== Personnel ==
Dio

- Ronnie James Dio – vocals
- Vinny Appice – drums
- Jimmy Bain – bass
- Vivian Campbell – guitar
- Claude Schnell – keyboards

Additional musician

- Craig Goldy – guitar on "Time to Burn"

Production

- Recorded at Rumbo Recorders, Los Angeles, California
- Produced by Ronnie James Dio
- Engineered by Angelo Arcuri
- Assistant engineered by Gary McGachan
- Laser effects: LaserMedia Inc., Los Angeles, California
- Laser operator: Michael Moorhead
- Originally mastered by Greg Fulginiti at Artisan Sound Recorders, Hollywood, California
- Remastered by Andy Pearce (2012 Universal Deluxe Edition)
- Mixed on Westlake Audio BBSM6 monitors
- Illustration by Robert Florczak

== Charts ==
Chart (1985)	Peak position
Australian Albums (Kent Music Report)	72
Austrian Albums (Ö3 Austria)	13
Canada Top Albums/CDs (RPM)	35
Dutch Albums (Album Top 100)	15
Finnish Albums (The Official Finnish Charts)	4
German Albums (Offizielle Top 100)	12
Norwegian Albums (VG-lista)	8
Swedish Albums (Sverigetopplistan)	6
Swiss Albums (Schweizer Hitparade)	14
UK Albums (Official Charts)	4
US Billboard 200	29

Chart (2012)	Peak position
Oricon Japanese Albums Charts	164
UK Rock & Metal Albums (Official Charts)	29

== Certifications ==
Region	Certification	Certified units/sales
United States (RIAA)	Gold	500,000^{^}
^{^} Shipments figures based on certification alone.
