= Rock 'n' Roll Children =

"Rock 'N' Roll Children"

Single by Dio

from the album Sacred Heart
- B-side: We Rock (live); The Last In Line (live)
- Released: July 1985
- Recorded: August 25, 1984 (live recordings); Philadelphia, USA; Rumbo Studios, Los Angeles, California, USA
- Genre: Heavy metal
- Length: 4:32
- Label: Vertigo
- Songwriter: Ronnie James Dio
- Producer: Ronnie James Dio

Dio singles chronology
"Mystery" (1984)	"Rock 'N' Roll Children" (1985)	"Hungry for Heaven" (1985)

"Rock 'N' Roll Children" is the sixth single released by heavy metal band Dio, appearing on their 1985 LP, Sacred Heart. It reached number 26 on the Billboard Top Album Tracks chart. By coincidence, it also reached number 26 in the UK Singles Chart in August 1985, and remains their most successful release in the United Kingdom to date.

A music video was made for the single. Ronnie James Dio stars as a magician who looks over a young runaway couple through a crystal ball. The boy had quit his rock star aspirations for a steadier job, much to his girlfriend's disappointment. A sudden storm forces them to seek shelter in a nearby antique shop, where they are then teleported to a mysterious realm. Once there, they get separated and encounter past visions of the troubled issues in their lives (e.g. an abusive father, failing in school, etc.) After being reunited and leaving the realm, the boy and girl make up and the former decides to renew his dream to be a rock star. The video ends with Dio switching the CLOSED sign to OPEN, with the implication that he will wait for other troubled individuals whom he can help.

== Chart performance ==
Chart (1985)	Peak position
UK Singles (Official Charts)	26
US Mainstream Rock (Billboard)	26
