= Claude Schnell =

American keyboardist (born 1955)

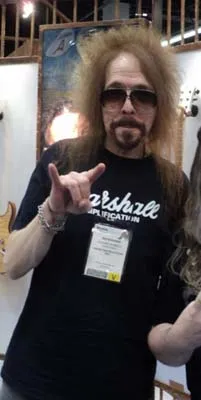
- Schnell at NAMM 2012.

Background information
- Born: May 17, 1955 (age 71); Brooklyn, New York, U.S.
- Genres: Hard rock, heavy metal
- Occupation: Keyboardist
- Years active: 1980s–present
- Website: claudeschnell.com

Claude Schnell (born May 17, 1955) is an American keyboardist who has been a member of the bands Magic, (Note: The band Magic that Claude Schnell was a member of wasn't the band that released the song "Rude".) Rough Cutt, Dio, and Last in Line.

== Biography ==
Born in Brooklyn, New York, and raised in France, when he was six years old his family moved back to New York, and Schnell immersed himself in the traditional classical piano curriculum of private lessons, practice and recitals.

As he was growing up, with the impact of artists like Jimi Hendrix playing in the Village, Humble Pie at the Fillmore and Zeppelin at Madison Square Garden, Schnell discovered rock and roll. He maintained the discipline of his Classical studies, he also began playing in a wide assortment of bands.

Schnell left New York City to spend several years in Buffalo where more long-term musical friendships were forged, most notably with bass players Billy Sheehan and Joe Cristofanilli, and drummer Pete O'Donnell.

Schnell arrived in Los Angeles in the early 1980s, where he was a founding member of two rock bands: Magic and Rough Cutt.

By 1983, Schnell's musical diligence and precision had earned him a reputation as one of L.A.'s most serious and well-respected players. Schnell joined Dio in May 1983. Schnell first played with Dio on the Holy Diver tour, though he did not play on the album itself.

After almost seven years in that band, Schnell chose to redefine his artistic focus, and embark upon his own musical odyssey.

== Discography ==
=== Dio ===
- The Last in Line (1984)
- Sacred Heart (1985)
- Intermission (1986)
- Dream Evil (1987)

=== Others ===
- 1983 - Rough Cutt – LA's Hottest Unsigned Rock Bands (compilation)
- 1985 - Y&T – Down for the Count
- 1985 - Mark Edwards – Code of Honor
- 1989 - Loudness – Soldier of Fortune
- 1989 - Doro – Force Majeure
- 1993 - Impellitteri – Victim of the System
- 1993 - Gary Hoey – Animal Instinct
- 2003 - Neil Turbin – Threatcon Delta
