= Dream Evil (album) =

Studio album by Dio
- Released: August 3, 1987
- Recorded: March–May 1987
- Studios: Village Recorder, Los Angeles
- Genres: Heavy metal; pop metal
- Length: 43:20
- Labels: Warner Bros. (North America); Vertigo (rest of the world)
- Producer: Ronnie James Dio

Dio chronology
Intermission (1986)	Dream Evil (1987)	Lock Up the Wolves (1990)

Singles from Dream Evil
- 1. "I Could Have Been a Dreamer" Released: July 6, 1987; 2. "All the Fools Sailed Away" Released: 1987 (EU)

Professional ratings
Review scores
Source	Rating
AllMusic	4/5 stars
Collector's Guide to Heavy Metal	9/10
Record Collector	3/5 stars
The Rolling Stone Album Guide	2/5 stars

Dream Evil is the fourth studio album by American heavy metal band Dio, released in August 1987. It is the first album without Vivian Campbell who left the band in 1986, and features former Rough Cutt members Craig Goldy on guitar and Claude Schnell on keyboards. It includes the singles "All the Fools Sailed Away" and "I Could Have Been a Dreamer". Dream Evil was Dio's last album to feature mascot Murray on the cover and also the last to feature drummer Vinny Appice until the 1993 album Strange Highways. It was also the last album to feature bassist Jimmy Bain until the release of 2000's Magica. The album also marks Schnell's final appearance with Dio.

== Track listing ==
All lyrics are written by Ronnie James Dio, music as stated.

Side one
No.	Title	Music	Length
1.	"Night People"	Vinny Appice, Jimmy Bain, Dio, Craig Goldy, Claude Schnell	4:06
2.	"Dream Evil"	Dio, Goldy	4:26
3.	"Sunset Superman"	Appice, Bain, Dio, Goldy, Schnell	5:45
4.	"All the Fools Sailed Away"	Dio, Goldy	7:10

Side two
No.	Title	Music	Length
5.	"Naked in the Rain"	Dio	5:09
6.	"Overlove"	Appice, Dio, Goldy	3:49
7.	"I Could Have Been a Dreamer"	Dio, Goldy	4:42
8.	"Faces in the Window"	Appice, Bain, Dio, Goldy, Schnell	3:53
9.	"When a Woman Cries"	Appice, Bain, Dio, Goldy, Schnell	4:43

Deluxe edition disc two
No.	Title	Original release	Length
1.	"Hide in the Rainbow"	Dio EP
2.	"I Could Have Been a Dreamer" (Single edit)	Single A-side
3.	"Dream Evil"	At Donington UK: Live 1983 & 1987
4.	"Neon Knights"	At Donington UK: Live 1983 & 1987
5.	"Naked in the Rain"	At Donington UK: Live 1983 & 1987
6.	"Rock & Roll Children"	At Donington UK: Live 1983 & 1987
7.	"Long Live Rock 'n' Roll"	At Donington UK: Live 1983 & 1987
8.	"The Last in Line"	At Donington UK: Live 1983 & 1987
9.	"Children of the Sea"	At Donington UK: Live 1983 & 1987
10.	"Holy Diver"	At Donington UK: Live 1983 & 1987
11.	"Heaven & Hell"	At Donington UK: Live 1983 & 1987
12.	"Man on the Silver Mountain"	At Donington UK: Live 1983 & 1987
13.	"All the Fools Sailed Away"	At Donington UK: Live 1983 & 1987
14.	"The Last in Line (Reprise)"	At Donington UK: Live 1983 & 1987
15.	"Rainbow in the Dark"	At Donington UK: Live 1983 & 1987

== Personnel ==
Dio

- Ronnie James Dio – vocals
- Vinny Appice – drums
- Jimmy Bain – bass
- Craig Goldy – guitars
- Claude Schnell – keyboards

Additional musicians

- Mitchell Singing Boys – chorus on "All the Fools Sailed Away"

Production

- Recorded at Village Recorder, Los Angeles, California
- Produced by Ronnie James Dio
- Engineered by Angelo Arcuri
- Assistant engineered by Charlie Brocco, Tom Biener and Allen Abrahamson
- Mixed at Record Plant, Los Angeles, California
- Originally mastered by George Marino at Sterling Sound, New York City
- Cover illustration by Steve Huston
- Cover model: Amanda Schendel

== Charts ==
Chart (1987)	Peak position
Australian Albums (Kent Music Report)	58
Austrian Albums (Ö3 Austria)	15
Canada Top Albums/CDs (RPM)	65
Dutch Albums (Album Top 100)	38
Finnish Albums (The Official Finnish Charts)	2
German Albums (Offizielle Top 100)	12
Norwegian Albums (VG-lista)	7
Swedish Albums (Sverigetopplistan)	4
Swiss Albums (Schweizer Hitparade)	13
UK Albums (Official Charts)	8
US Billboard 200	43

== See also ==
- 1987 in music
