= The Last in Line =

Studio album by Dio
- Released: July 2, 1984
- Studio: Caribou Ranch (Colorado)
- Genre: Heavy metal
- Length: 41:07
- Labels: Warner Bros.; Vertigo
- Producer: Ronnie James Dio

Dio chronology
Holy Diver (1983)	The Last in Line (1984)	Sacred Heart (1985)

Singles from The Last in Line
- 1. "The Last in Line" Released: June 11, 1984 (EU); 2. "We Rock" Released: August 3, 1984 (UK); 3. "Mystery" Released: September 21, 1984

The Last In Line is the second studio album by American heavy metal band Dio, released on July 2, 1984. It is the first Dio album to feature keyboardist Claude Schnell as a band member. The album became the band's highest-charting album in both the UK and the U.S., reaching number 4 and number 23, respectively (Sacred Heart would later reach number 4 in the UK as well).

It was certified gold (500,000 units sold) by the RIAA on September 12, 1984, and was the first Dio album to be certified platinum, achieving the feat on February 3, 1987. In the UK, The Last in Line attained Silver certification (60,000 units sold) by the British Phonographic Industry, achieving this in January 1986, at the same time as Holy Diver. To date, these are the only two Dio albums to be certified at least platinum.

== Reissues ==
The album, along with Holy Diver and Sacred Heart, was released in a new two-CD deluxe edition on March 19, 2012, through Universal for worldwide distribution outside the U.S.

== Critical reception ==
Professional ratings
Review scores
Source	Rating
AllMusic	3.5/5 stars
Collector's Guide to Heavy Metal	10/10
Rock Hard	9.5/10

In 2005, The Last In Line was ranked number 372 in Rock Hard magazine's book of The 500 Greatest Rock & Metal Albums of All Time.

== Track listing ==
All lyrics are written by Ronnie James Dio, music as stated.

Side one
No.	Title	Music	Length
1.	"We Rock"	Dio	4:36
2.	"The Last in Line"	Dio, Jimmy Bain, Vivian Campbell	5:40
3.	"Breathless"	Dio, Campbell	4:04
4.	"I Speed at Night"	Dio, Vinny Appice, Bain, Campbell	3:22
5.	"One Night in the City"	Dio, Appice, Bain, Campbell	5:15

Side two
No.	Title	Music	Length
6.	"Evil Eyes"	Dio	3:38
7.	"Mystery"	Dio, Bain	3:46
8.	"Eat Your Heart Out"	Dio, Appice, Bain, Campbell	3:49
9.	"Egypt (The Chains Are On)"	Dio, Appice, Bain, Campbell	6:57

Deluxe edition disc two
No.	Title	Music	Length
1.	"Eat Your Heart Out" (live B-side of "Mystery" 12')	Dio, Appice, Bain, Campbell	5:11
2.	"Don't Talk to Strangers" (live B-side of "Mystery" 12')	Dio	6:03
3.	"Holy Diver" (live B-side of "We Rock")	Dio	4:23
4.	"Rainbow in the Dark" (live B-side of "We Rock" 12')	Dio, Appice, Bain, Campbell	4:43
5.	"One Night in the City" (live at Pinkpop Festival, Geleen, Netherlands, June 11, 1984)	Dio, Appice, Bain, Campbell	5:55
6.	"We Rock" (live at Pinkpop Festival, Geleen, Netherlands, June 11, 1984)	Dio	5:05
7.	"Holy Diver" (live at Pinkpop Festival, Geleen, Netherlands, June 11, 1984)	Dio	4:28
8.	"Stargazer" (live at Pinkpop Festival, Geleen, Netherlands, June 11, 1984)	Ritchie Blackmore, Dio	1:53
9.	"Heaven and Hell" (live at Pinkpop Festival, Geleen, Netherlands, June 11, 1984)	Geezer Butler, Dio, Tony Iommi, Bill Ward	13:03
10.	"Rainbow in the Dark" (live at Pinkpop Festival, Geleen, Netherlands, June 11, 1984)	Dio, Appice, Bain, Campbell	5:11
11.	"Man on the Silver Mountain" (live at Pinkpop Festival, Geleen, Netherlands, June 11, 1984)	Blackmore, Dio	8:14
12.	"Don't Talk to Strangers" (live at Pinkpop Festival, Geleen, Netherlands, June 11, 1984)	Dio	5:38

== Personnel ==
Dio

- Ronnie James Dio – vocals, keyboards
- Vinny Appice – drums
- Jimmy Bain – bass
- Vivian Campbell – guitar
- Claude Schnell – keyboards

Production

- Ronnie James Dio – producer
- Caribou Ranch, Colorado – recorded at
- Angelo Arcuri – audio engineer
- Rich Markowitz – assistant engineer
- Mixed on Westlake Audio BBSM6 monitors
- George Marino – mastering at Sterling Sound, New York
- Andy Pearce – remastering for the 2012 Universal deluxe edition
- Steve Hoffman – remastering for the 2012 Audio Fidelity 24K edition
- Barry Jackson – illustration

== Charts ==
Chart (1984)	Peak position
Canada Top Albums/CDs (RPM)	51
Dutch Albums (Album Top 100)	11
Finnish Albums (The Official Finnish Charts)	5
German Albums (Offizielle Top 100)	23
Norwegian Albums (VG-lista)	7
Swedish Albums (Sverigetopplistan)	6
UK Albums (Official Charts)	4
US Billboard 200	23

Chart (2012)	Peak position
Oricon Japanese Albums Charts	154
UK Rock & Metal Albums (Official Charts)	23

== Certifications ==
Region	Certification	Certified units/sales
United Kingdom (BPI)	Silver	60,000^{^}
United States (RIAA)	Platinum	1,000,000^{^}
^{^} Shipments figures based on certification alone.
