= Sweet Savage =

Northern Irish heavy metal band

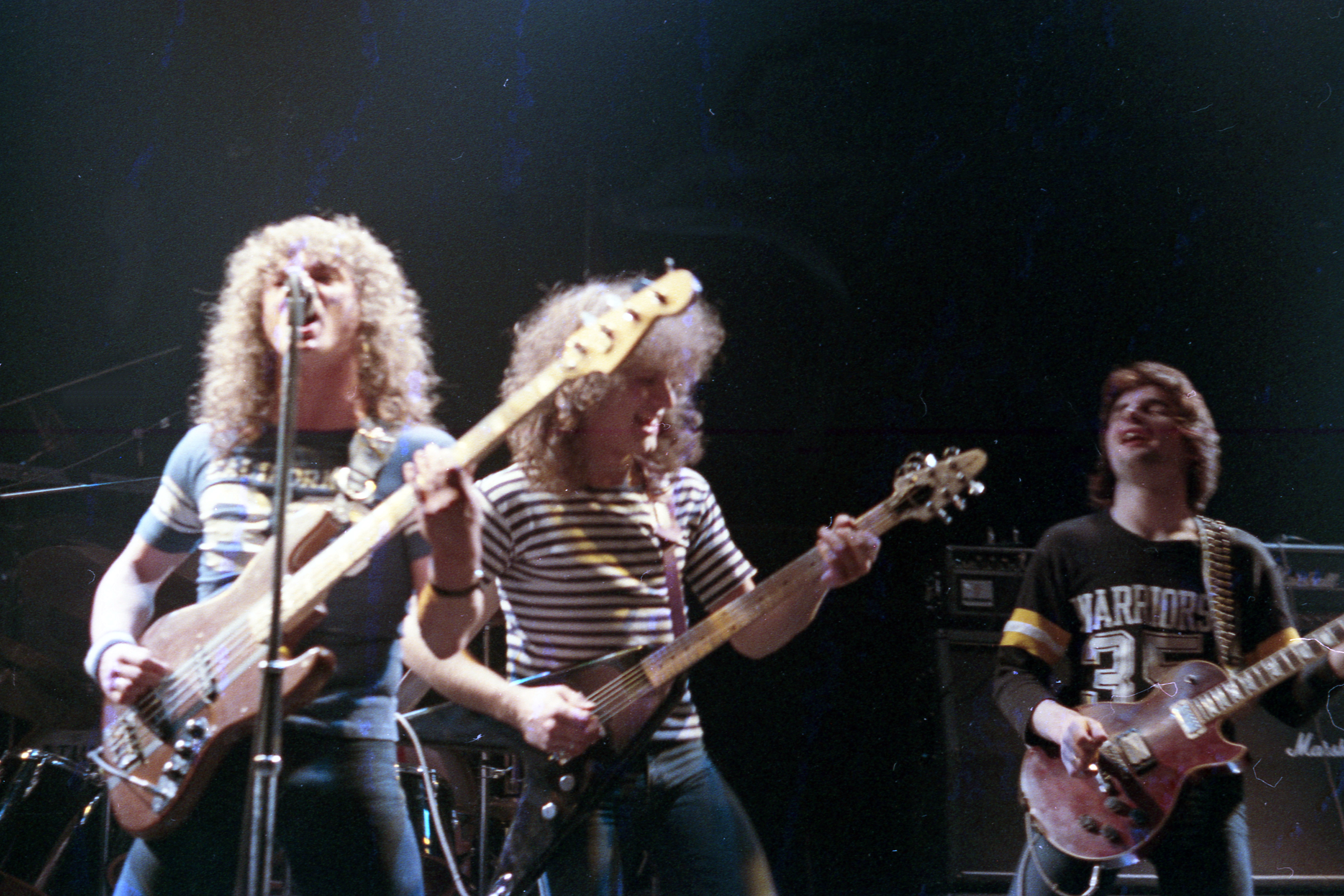
- Sweet Savage live in 1981

Background information
- Origin: Belfast, Northern Ireland
- Genres: Heavy metal
- Years active: 1979–present
- Labels: earMusic, Park, Crashed, Neat, SPV
- Members: Ray Haller; Marty McCloskey; Phil Edgar
- Past members: Vivian Campbell; Simon McBride; Davy Bates; Jules Watson; Trev Fleming; Rob Cass; Ian Wilson

Sweet Savage are a heavy metal band from Belfast, Northern Ireland, formed in 1979. Future Dio & Def Leppard guitarist Vivian Campbell and Deep Purple guitarist Simon McBride were members of the band. Since forming in 1979, Sweet Savage have released four studio albums, three singles and one demo.

Considered one of the pioneers of the new wave of British heavy metal movement alongside acts such as Iron Maiden, Saxon, Diamond Head, and Def Leppard, due to a handful of songs, most notably, played and recorded live on the BBC Radio One - The Friday Rock Show. The band however, only released two singles in their first incarnation, failed to record a single album and thus success eluded them, leading to a hiatus by 1983.

The band reconvened in 1984 with a different line-up, but did not last long. The band reformed for a second time in the 1990s, following Metallica's cover of their song "Killing Time" as a B-side for their "The Unforgiven" single, recording two albums, before going on hiatus for a third time. Sweet Savage then reformed in 2008, recording their third studio album, Regeneration, which was released in 2011. The band has remained active since reforming in 2008 and released their fourth album, Bang, with German record label earMUSIC in 2025.

== History ==
=== Early days (1979–1983) ===
Sweet Savage began with a line-up of Trev Fleming and Vivian Campbell on guitars, David Bates on drums and Ray Haller on bass and vocals. The band gained a support slot for Thin Lizzy on their Renegade tour and supported acts such as Ozzy Osbourne, Wishbone Ash and Motörhead.

In 1981 the band signed to Park Records and released their first single "Take No Prisoners" which was limited to 1000 copies – this single included the song "Killing Time". A self-released demo known as Demo 81 was released at this time, which contained a BBC session of four songs.

In early 1983, guitarist Campbell accepted an offer to join Dio and subsequently left the band.

=== Reform (1984–1985) ===
After a year long break, Sweet Savage decided to reform, but without Campbell and Fleming. Ian "Speedo" Wilson joined Sweet Savage on guitar and the band recorded a single with vocalist Robert Casserly, "Straight Through the Heart" and was released on Crashed Records. In 1985, the band recorded their third single "The Raid". After this, Sweet Savage disbanded for a second time.

=== The albums (1996–1998) ===
Much later in the late 1990s after Metallica covered "Killing Time" in 1991 as a B-side for "The Unforgiven", there was renewed interest for Sweet Savage. Fuelled by this interest, the band reformed and signed to Neat Records in 1996, releasing their first studio album entitled Killing Time. The original lyrics to the track, which Metallica covered, (the original Sweet Savage version and the Metallica cover can both easily be found on YouTube) had racial overtones that have since been removed from all lyrics sheets. The band at this stage were joined by Simon McBride on lead guitar and the return of Trev Fleming on additional guitar. Ian Wilson was concentrating on other projects and was not present on the Killing Time record, with Simon McBride taking over from him. Killing Time contained re-worked and re-recorded versions of songs that were originally released early on in their career.

Two years later in 1998, the band recorded and released an album of completely new material entitled Rune. Following the two albums, the band went on hiatus as each member wanted to follow different musical routes.

=== Present day revival (since 2008) ===
In 2008, Maniacal Records from the USA was to release the band's early studio material on vinyl, but the band abruptly cancelled the project, citing lawsuit concerns from a former member. 23 April 2008 saw the long-awaited return to the stage by Sweet Savage, as they supported Saxon on the St. Georges Day concert in London's Shepherds Bush Empire. Bates decided to leave the band and was replaced by Jules Watson. A trip to Germany ensued in early August where they played the Headbangers Festival and the Wacken Festival to great acclaim. Later that month they supported Metallica & Tenacious D in Dublin, Marlay Park, 20 August 2008. On 1 August 2009, again in Marlay Park, Ray Haller joined Metallica on stage for "Killing Time".

The current line-up of Haller, Wilson, Fleming and Watson has been cited as being "the strongest version of the band" by the industry professionals and as frontman Ray Haller explains "All this interest lately, has come out of the blue and it's phenomenal how well the band is being received by everyone. We played Germany for the first time recently and were surprised to hear the kids singing our tunes back to us, we really had no idea how popular the band are."

In 2009 Sweet Savage were confirmed as the support along with Doro for Saxon’s Battalions Of Steel World Tour II.

2009 also saw the release of their newest studio effort entitled Warbird, on SPV Records. The album features Vivian Campbell making a guest appearance on a cover of Thin Lizzy's "Whiskey in the Jar".

At the band's support show with Motörhead, lead singer Ray Haller confirmed that the new record Warbird would have been released in early 2010 and not 2009 as planned.

On 7 July 2010 Sweet Savage were announced as replacement support for the first date of Iron Maiden's Final Frontier European Tour at the O2 in Dublin on 30 July 2010. Heaven & Hell were originally announced as support, but were forced to cancel all of their summer dates due to Ronnie James Dio's death. At the show, Sweet Savage introduced a packed Dublin crowd to new drummer Marty McCloskey who would be taking over from Jules Watson. Watson went on to drum for Conjuring Fate. The band revealed that the record Warbird, which had been postponed due to the current economic climatic in the music business, would be seeing a full release in late 2010. As of late 2019, it remains unreleased.

On 2 October 2010, guitarist and songwriter Trev Fleming died after treatment for a recent illness, he had been missing from the band's line-up since February 2010 and was not present for support slots with Deep Purple and Iron Maiden or for Sweet Savage's performance at Sonisphere Festival.

Ray Haller joined Metallica onstage on 7 December 2011 at The Fillmore in San Francisco, CA for Metallica's 30th Anniversary show. Ray sang "Killing Time" with Metallica and also backing vocals on their track "Seek & Destroy". This was the second of four shows that Metallica played.

On 10 July 2025, Sweet Savage announced that they had signed with German record label earMusic for the release of their album Bang which would be available on 12 September 2025. The announcement was coupled with the release of their new single, the albums title track, Bang. On 31 July 2025, the band released the second single from their forthcoming album, The Chosen One. The new album features the bands current lineup with the addition of Deep Purple's Simon McBride, himself a former member of Sweet Savage, playing guitar on the record.

== Band members ==
Current

- Ray Haller – vocals, bass guitar (since 1979)
- Marty McCloskey – drums (since 2010)
- Phil Edgar – guitar (since 2011)

Former

- Trev Fleming – guitar (1979–1983, 1996, 2008–2010; his death)
- Vivian Campbell – guitar (1979–1983)
- David Bates – drums (1979–2008)
- Rob Cass - vocals (1983–1985)
- Ian Wilson – guitar (1984–2012)
- Jules Watson – drums (2008–2010; died 2021)
- Simon McBride – guitar (1996–1998)

== Discography ==
=== Studio albums ===
- Killing Time (Metal Blade; 1996)
- Rune (Neat Metal Nation; 1998)
- Regeneration (Candyman; 2011)
- Bang (earMusic; 2025)

=== Singles ===
- Take No Prisoners (Park Records- PKR 1001; 1981)
- Straight Through the Heart (Crashed Music – CAR 48; 1984)
- The Raid (Park Records– PKR 1003; 1985)
- Bang (earMusic; 2025)
- The Chosen One (earMusic; 2025)

=== Live sessions ===
- Friday Rock Show (BBC; 1981)

=== Compilations ===
- The Friday Rock Show (BBC Records; 1981)
  Featured track: "Eye of the Storm"
- Now in Session (Downtown Radio; 1982)
  Featured track: "Lady of the Night"
- NWOBHM '79 Revisited (Caroline Records; 1990)
  Featured track: "Eye of the Storm"
- Lightnin' to the Nations: 25th Anniversary of NWOBHM (2005)
  Featured track: "Killing Time"
- Full Metal Garage: The Songs That Drove Metallica (2006)
  Featured track: "Killing Time"

== See also ==
- List of new wave of British heavy metal bands
