= Holy Diver =

Studio album by Dio
- Released: May 25, 1983
- Recorded: 1983
- Studios: Sound City (Van Nuys, California)
- Genre: Heavy metal
- Length: 41:46
- Label: Warner Bros.
- Producer: Ronnie James Dio

Dio chronology
Holy Diver (1983)	The Last in Line (1984)

Ronnie James Dio chronology
Live Evil (1982)	Holy Diver (1983)	The Last in Line (1984)

Singles from Holy Diver
- 1. "Holy Diver" Released: August 12, 1983; 2. "Rainbow in the Dark" Released: October 21, 1983

Holy Diver is the debut studio album by the American heavy metal band Dio, released in 1983. The album was acclaimed by the music press and is the band's most successful album. It produced the singles "Holy Diver" and "Rainbow in the Dark" both of which received radio play. The album was eventually certified double platinum by the RIAA for 2 million copies sold in the US.

== History ==
Released on May 25, 1983, the album has been hailed by critics as Dio's best work and a classic staple in the heavy metal genre. The album debuted at number 56 on the Billboard 200, and produced the singles "Holy Diver" and "Rainbow in the Dark" which both reached the top 20 on the US mainstream rock chart along with the UK Singles top 100. The album was certified gold in the US on September 12, 1984, and platinum on March 21, 1989. In the UK it attained Silver certification (60,000 units sold) by the British Phonographic Industry, achieving this in January 1986, at the same time as The Last in Line.

Music videos were created for both "Holy Diver" and "Rainbow in the Dark".

The original vinyl release had a photomontage LP-liner, with images from both Rainbow and Black Sabbath days.

The album was remastered and re-released by Rock Candy Records in 2005. The only notable addition to the original album is an audio interview with Ronnie James Dio. Tracks 10–19 on the 2005 edition are Dio's answers to various questions about the album. The questions are not posed during the interview itself, but can be found inside the CD's booklet instead. The album, along with The Last in Line and Sacred Heart, were released in a new two-CD deluxe edition on March 19, 2012 through Universal for worldwide distribution outside the U.S.

"Caught in the Middle" shares the main guitar riff with Campbell's previous band Sweet Savage's song "Straight Through the Heart" (1983), whose title was used for another song in this album.

=== Album art ===
The album art is illustrated by Randy Berrett. It features the band's mascot Murray, a demonic creature, pulling or whipping a snapped metal chain and a Catholic priest flailing and splashing around in a body of water, wrapped up and locked in the other end of the broken chain. Dio was quick to argue that appearances are misleading, that it could just as easily be a priest killing a devil, wanting people not to "judge a book by its cover".

Murray is featured on several other Dio albums.

== Themes ==
Around the time of making the album, a rise of heroic adventure elements in popular culture (such as J. R. R. Tolkien's The Lord of the Rings books and role-playing games Dungeons & Dragons) were having influence. "Much of heavy metal took place on similar turf, a realm of dark towers and impenetrable wilderness populated by battles and adversity." When Ronnie James Dio had been with Black Sabbath, "He reverently refurbished and reinvented the band's stately doom with grandiose concepts ... Dio found a fertile fantasy framework for the big Sabbath themes of madness and desolation". Dio, who had read Sir Walter Scott, Arthurian tales, and science fiction growing up, had previously used fantasy lyrics in both his 1970s bands Elf and Rainbow respectively. He explained the influence of his youthful reading to an interviewer, saying, "When I became a songwriter, I thought what better thing to do than do what no one else is doing ... to tell fantasy tales. Smartest thing I ever did."

The metaphor of "riding the tiger", employed in the song, is attested in a Chinese proverb translated in 1875 as "He who rides a tiger is afraid to dismount". It had previously found prominent use in John F. Kennedy's inaugural presidential speech of January 20, 1961, as well as in the titles of the far-right thinker Julius Evola's 1961 book and of the American rock band Jefferson Starship's opening song on their 1974 Dragon Fly album.

== Reception ==
Professional ratings
Review scores
Source	Rating
AllMusic	4.5/5 stars
Collector's Guide to Heavy Metal	10/10
Kerrang!	Brilliant
Mojo	4/5 stars
Pitchfork	9.0/10
Sputnikmusic	5/5 stars

AllMusic reviewer Eduardo Rivadavia praises the album, stating that:

aside from Ronnie's unquestionably stellar songwriting, Holy Diver's stunning quality and consistency owed much to his carefully chosen bandmates, including powerhouse drummer and fellow [Black] Sabbath survivor Vinny Appice, veteran bassist Jimmy Bain, and a phenomenal find in young Irish guitarist Vivian Campbell, whose tastefully pyrotechnic leads helped make this the definitive Dio lineup. Holy Diver remains the undisputed highlight of Dio's career ... and, indeed, one of the finest pure heavy metal albums of the 1980s.

Canadian reviewer Martin Popoff describes the album as "quintessential traditional metal", with Ronnie James Dio "almost single-handedly reinventing gothic hard rock for the '80s, incorporating strong melodic hooks and more than the genre's usual share of velvety, classical-based pyrotechnics." Kerrang! gave the album a positive review in 1983 and Holy Diver ended up at no. 5 in the British magazine's End of Year list of best releases. Today, Kerrang! still considers it a "perfect melodic metal album" and an "essential purchase".

The rock historian Ian Christe relates that for the post-Sabbath solo career:

Dio simplified his stories substantially for a younger heavy metal audience. The 1983 debut Holy Diver, by his band Dio, reduced lush moral landscapes to simple good-versus-evil conflicts, using the lyrical duality of 'Rainbow in the Dark' and 'Holy Diver' to raise questions about deceit and hypocrisy in romance and religion. In the sharp contrasts of Dio's imagery, there was always a built-in contradiction that fed adolescent revolt: a black side to every white light, and a hidden secret behind every loud proclamation of truth. In a similar way, Dio's music balanced torrents of rage with brief acoustic interludes.

Placing the album at number 8 on its "Top 25 Metal Albums" list, IGN wrote:

In all his bands, in all his roles, in all his musical vagabond choices, Ronnie James Dio has been fortunate enough to be associated with some of heavy metal's best -- Sabbath, Rainbow, and his own band Dio. To best represent his tenure in the genre, one must look no farther than Holy Diver. His first album with his new band was also his best. It is one of metal's best albums, and it spawned two of the greatest metal songs of the '80s: 'Holy Diver' and 'Rainbow in the Dark'. Featuring the underrated Vivian Campbell on guitar, this album showed that Dio could do it on his own.

=== Accolades ===
Region	Year	Publication	Accolade	Rank
Canada	2013	Metal Rules	Top 100 Heavy Metal Albums	8
United Kingdom	2006	Revolver	69 Greatest Metal Albums Of All Time	57
United Kingdom	2013	NME	100 Greatest Heavy Metal Albums	17
United States	2007	IGN	Top 25 Metal Albums	8
United States	2017	Rolling Stone	100 Greatest Metal Albums of All Time	16
United States	2022	Loudwire	Top 80 Hard Rock + Metal Albums of the 1980s	17
United States	2025	Consequence	75 Best Metal Albums of All Time	19

== Track listing ==
=== Original release ===
All lyrics are written by Ronnie James Dio, music as stated.

Side one
No.	Title	Music	Length
1.	"Stand Up and Shout"	Dio, Jimmy Bain	3:15
2.	"Holy Diver"	Dio	5:54
3.	"Gypsy"	Dio, Vivian Campbell	3:39
4.	"Caught in the Middle"	Dio, Vinny Appice, Campbell	4:15
5.	"Don't Talk to Strangers"	Dio	4:53

Side two
No.	Title	Music	Length
1.	"Straight Through the Heart"	Dio, Bain	4:32
2.	"Invisible"	Dio, Appice, Campbell	5:26
3.	"Rainbow in the Dark"	Dio, Appice, Bain, Campbell	4:15
4.	"Shame on the Night"	Dio, Appice, Bain, Campbell	5:20

Deluxe edition disc two
No.	Title	Music	Length
1.	"Evil Eyes" (Studio B-side of "Holy Diver")	Dio	3:46
2.	"Stand Up and Shout" (Live B-side of "Rainbow in the Dark" 12")	Dio, Bain	4:13
3.	"Straight Through the Heart" (Live B-side of "Rainbow in the Dark" 12")	Dio, Bain	4:36
4.	"Stand Up and Shout" (Live at the King Biscuit Flower Hour, October 30, 1983)	Dio, Bain	3:38
5.	"Shame on the Night" (Live at the King Biscuit Flower Hour, October 30, 1983)	Dio, Appice, Bain, Campbell	5:20
6.	"Children of the Sea" (Live at the King Biscuit Flower Hour, October 30, 1983)	Geezer Butler, Dio, Tony Iommi, Bill Ward	6:15
7.	"Holy Diver" (Live at the King Biscuit Flower Hour, October 30, 1983)	Dio	5:57
8.	"Rainbow in the Dark" (Live at the King Biscuit Flower Hour, October 30, 1983)	Dio, Appice, Bain, Campbell	5:14
9.	"Man on the Silver Mountain" (Live at the King Biscuit Flower Hour, October 30, 1983)	Ritchie Blackmore, Dio	6:51

== Personnel ==
Dio

- Ronnie James Dio – vocals, keyboards, production
- Vinny Appice – drums
- Jimmy Bain – bass, keyboards
- Vivian Campbell – guitar

Production

- Engineered by Angelo Arcuri, assisted by Ray Leonard
- Recorded at Sound City, Los Angeles
- Mastered by George Marino at Sterling Sound, New York
- Remastered by Gary Moore at Universal Digital Mastering, London (2005 Rock Candy reissue)
- Remastered by Andy Pearce (2012 Universal Deluxe Edition)
- Remastered by Steve Hoffman (2012 Audio Fidelity 24K edition)
- Illustration by Randy Berrett
- Original art rendering by Gene Hunter
- Original concept by Wendy Dio

== Charts ==
Chart (1983)	Peak position
Finnish Albums (The Official Finnish Charts)	15
German Albums (Offizielle Top 100)	52
New Zealand Albums (RMNZ)	43
Swedish Albums (Sverigetopplistan)	18
UK Albums (Official Charts)	13
US Billboard 200	56

Chart (2012)	Peak position
Japanese Albums (Oricon)	176

Chart (2021)	Peak position
Scottish Albums (Official Charts)	86
UK Rock & Metal Albums (Official Charts)	9

== Certifications ==
Region	Certification	Certified units/sales
United Kingdom (BPI)	Silver	60,000^{^}
United States (RIAA)	2× Platinum	2,000,000^{‡}
^{^} Shipments figures based on certification alone.^{‡} Sales+streaming figures based on certification alone.

== See also ==
- Holy Diver – Live
