= Vivian Campbell =

Irish guitarist (born 1962)

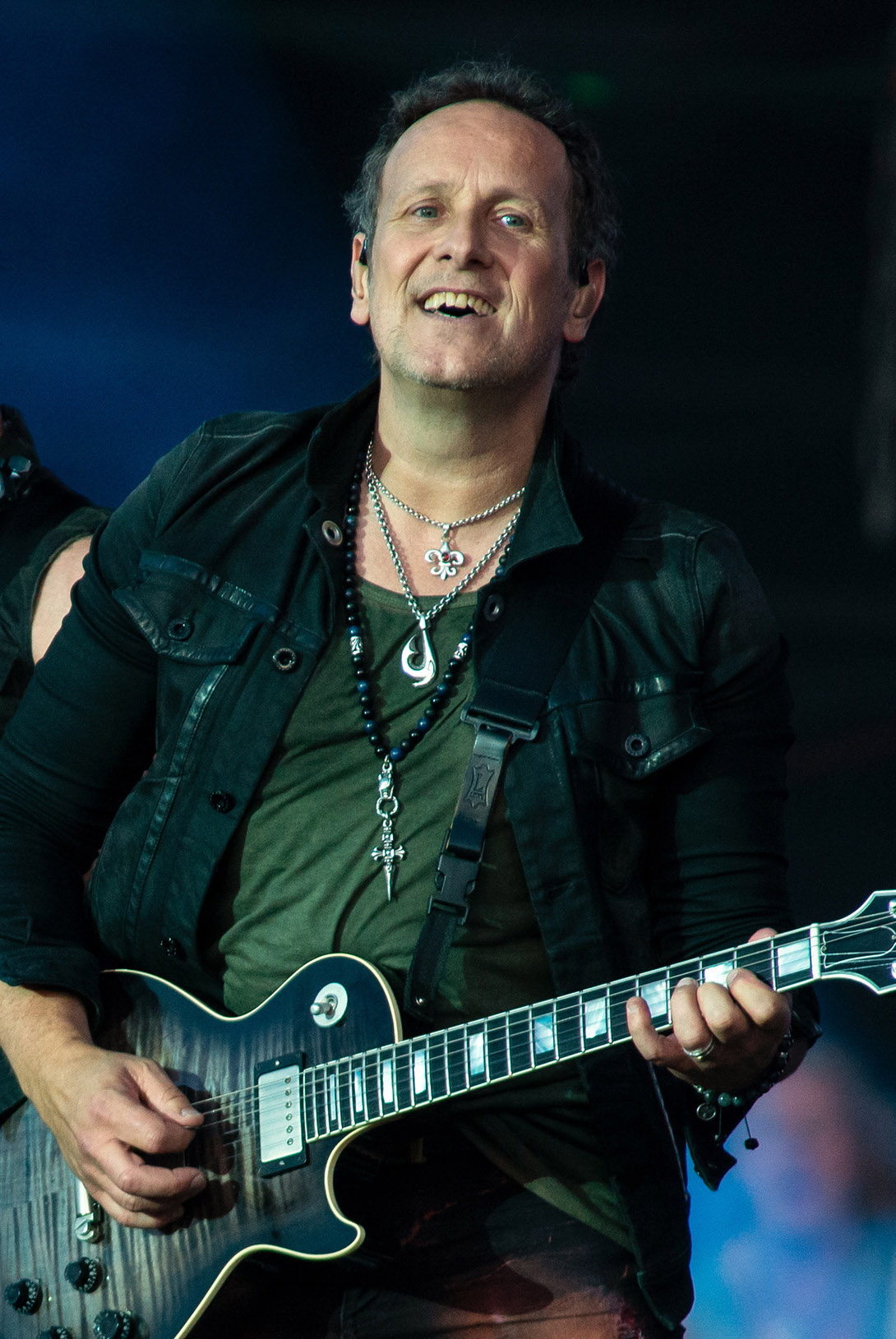
- Campbell with Def Leppard in 2019

Background information
- Born: Vivian Patrick Campbell; 25 August 1962 (age 64); Lisburn, Northern Ireland
- Genres: Hard rock; blues rock; heavy metal; glam metal
- Occupations: Musician
- Instruments: Guitar; vocals
- Years active: 1977–present
- Member of: Def Leppard; Last in Line; Riverdogs
- Formerly of: Dio; Hear 'n Aid; Shadow King; Sweet Savage; Thin Lizzy; Trinity; Whitesnake
- Website: viviancampbell.com

Vivian Patrick Campbell (born 25 August 1962) is a Northern Irish musician. He came to prominence in the early 1980s as the guitarist of Dio. He has also been the guitarist of Def Leppard since 1992 (following Steve Clark after his death). Campbell has also worked with Thin Lizzy, Whitesnake, Sweet Savage, Trinity, Riverdogs, Lou Gramm and Shadow King.

== Biography ==
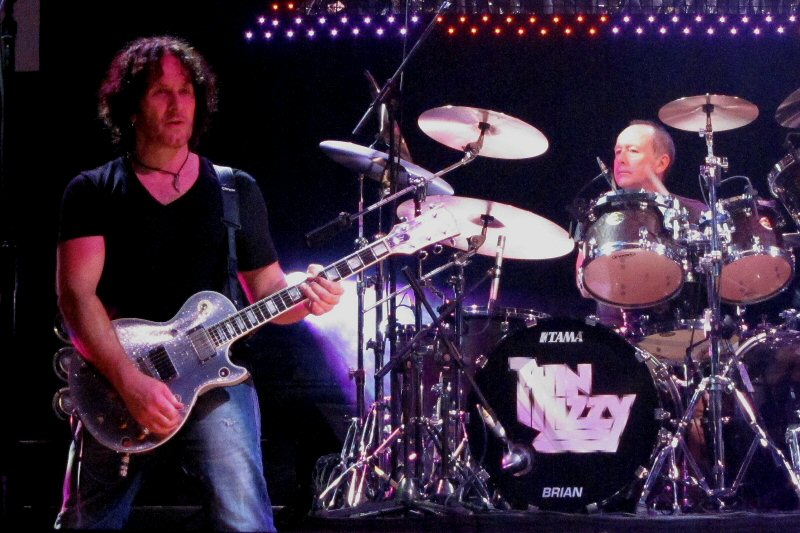
Campbell and Brian Downey in Thin Lizzy

Campbell began playing guitar at the age of 12 with a Telecaster Thinline and Carlsbro Stingray amp. When he was 15, Campbell joined Teaser, which went on to become Sweet Savage, a NWOBHM band. In 1981 they released an EP consisting of four BBC Radio sessions and their first single, "Take No Prisoners". The band's song "Killing Time" was later covered by Metallica as a B-side for their "The Unforgiven" single, and was included on Metallica's Garage Inc. covers album. Campbell left Sweet Savage in early 1983 to join Dio after guitarist Jake E. Lee was offered Randy Rhoads's spot as Ozzy Osbourne's lead guitarist in December 1982.

=== Dio ===
When Campbell joined Dio, Ronnie James Dio, Vinny Appice, and former Rainbow bassist Jimmy Bain had most of the songs to the album Holy Diver already written. The album was a success and included Dio's biggest hit, "Rainbow in the Dark".

Dio returned to the studio to write and record the follow-up to Holy Diver, The Last in Line, which charted at No. 23 in the US. "The Last in Line". The follow-up Sacred Heart was also a success, and managed to peak at No. 29 in the U.S. It featured the hits "Rock N Roll Children" and "Hungry For Heaven", the second of which was also included on the soundtrack to the film Vision Quest. Also around this time the band recorded the song "Hide in the Rainbow" for the Iron Eagle soundtrack, the last song Campbell recorded with Dio. A live EP Intermission was also released. Craig Goldy played on the disc's only studio song "Time to Burn" and over-dubbed the rhythm parts on the live tracks. Campbell and the band parted company in 1986 and he joined Whitesnake. He was replaced by Goldy.

Campbell's post-Dio relationship, including how Campbell considered his Dio years relative to his identity as a musician, has at times seemed positive, at times negative. For example, in 2003 Campbell said Dio was "one of the vilest people in the industry." Campbell later stated that he regretted making the statement., and Ronnie James Dio stated in an article in Hit Parader that he wished Campbell "the best." Further, in 2012 Campbell reunited with original Dio members bassist Jimmy Bain and drummer Vinny Appice, along with vocalist Andrew Freeman, to form the band Last in Line, and Campbell subsequently made statements that suggest he had come to view his time in Dio more positively than he previously had indicated.

=== Whitesnake ===
In 1987, Campbell joined English hard rock group Whitesnake, who had recently recorded their album Whitesnake. Lead singer David Coverdale, who had fired all other members of the band during the recording process, was putting together a new line-up and along with Campbell, they recruited guitarist Adrian Vandenberg, bassist Rudy Sarzo and drummer Tommy Aldridge. The first time the bandmembers all met each other was at the music video shoot for "Still of the Night". This new line-up appeared in all promotional materials for the aforementioned album despite not playing on any of the songs. Campbell, however, did re-record the guitar solo for the single release of "Give Me All Your Love".

During the supporting tour for the band's self-titled album, Campbell's wife was barred from traveling with the group, due to strife between her and Coverdale's wife Tawny Kitaen; this caused friction between Campbell and Coverdale. After the tour ended, the latter informed the rest of the band that the next Whitesnake album would be written by him and Adrian Vandenberg alone. Vandenberg, for his part, did not want Campbell in the band and sought to be Whitesnake's sole guitarist. Campbell later remarked: "I knew deep inside that this wasn't a band I would last in for too long." Eventually Campbell was informed by Whitesnake's tour manager that he had been fired. He officially exited Whitesnake in December 1988, with David Coverdale citing musical differences.

Campbell's relationship with Coverdale remained strained for many years after his departure, due to the way Coverdale handled his firing. It was not until 2008, when Def Leppard and Whitesnake toured together, that Campbell and Coverdale were able to sort out their past differences. Campbell remarked: "David was very apologetic, and pointed out that he was in this bad relationship, living in an ivory tower, having people do things instead of doing those things by himself. — All this belongs in the past. We are all good now." In 2015, Campbell joined Whitesnake on stage for a performance of "Still of the Night" in Sheffield, England. Campbell has stated, that he does not consider Whitesnake an important part of his career: "We were all great individually, but that lineup with those musicians never really gelled. It was fun at the time, and I was flattered to have been invited to be a part of the band, but it doesn't mean an awful lot to me from a musical point of view."

=== Lou Gramm, Riverdogs and Shadow King ===
After leaving Whitesnake, Campbell played on Lou Gramm's second solo album, Long Hard Look. Though Gramm toured in support of the album, Campbell did not join him. Now a free agent in the business, Campbell joined the group Riverdogs after being tapped to produce their first demo. As an official member of the band, he contributed to their eponymous debut album in 1990. Campbell once again teamed up with Lou Gramm in 1991 to join Gramm's new band Shadow King. After a single eponymous album, one music video, and one live show, Campbell left the group to join Def Leppard. Shadow King soon disbanded following Campbell's departure as Gramm and bassist Bruce Turgon returned to Gramm's former band Foreigner.

=== Def Leppard ===
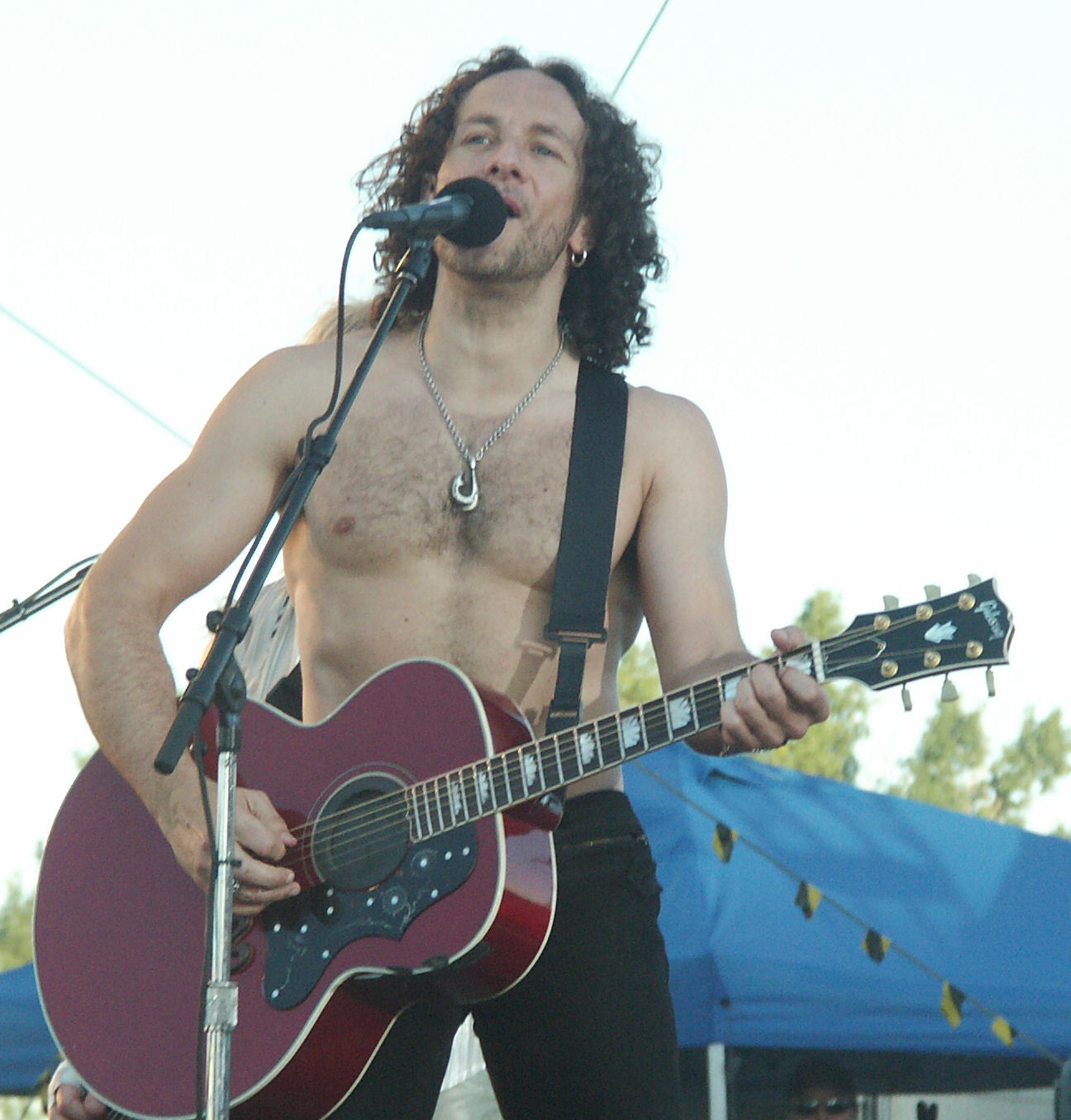
Campbell performing in 2007

In April 1992, Campbell joined the rock band Def Leppard, after the release of their Adrenalize album. He replaced Steve Clark, who died on 8 January 1991.

According to fellow guitarist Phil Collen, Campbell was able to lock right into the position very naturally by simply being himself. Campbell made his debut with the band by playing a show in a Dublin club. A week later, 20 April 1992, the band took the stage at the Freddie Mercury Tribute Concert, with Vivian as their new guitarist.

Despite treatment for Hodgkin's lymphoma, Campbell continued to tour with Def Leppard during summer 2013, and he and the rest of the band returned to the stage in summer 2014 as co-headliners with Kiss.

=== Solo and other projects ===
In 2005 Campbell released a solo album produced by Tor Hyams called Two Sides of If, which features cover versions of his favourite blues tunes and one original blues song. Terry Bozzio plays drums on the album. ZZ Top's Billy Gibbons guests on two songs, and Joan Osborne on one other song.

In mid-2010/early 2011, when Def Leppard was on hiatus, Campbell agreed to join Thin Lizzy, long his favorite band. After the tour, which he said inspired him to play more aggressively, he asked Jimmy Bain and Vinny Appice—both members of the original Dio band—to get together for a Dio tribute project that ultimately became the band Last in Line. With singer Andrew Freeman, they recorded the album Heavy Crown. Bain died before the album was released, and Campbell praised his creativity and his presence, adding that Bain deserved co-writing credits on more of the early Dio songs. Last in Line continued on, recruiting Phil Soussan to take over playing bass. The band released two more albums, II in 2019 and Jericho in 2023.

== Personal life ==
Campbell currently lives in New Hampshire and has two daughters with ex-wife Julie Campbell. After divorcing, Campbell married his longtime girlfriend Caitlin Phaneuf on 4 July 2014. He also plays football regularly with Hollywood United F.C., a team composed mostly of celebrities and former professional football players.

On 10 June 2013, Campbell announced that he had Hodgkin's lymphoma. In November 2013 he claimed to be in partial remission, but in June 2014 he said the statement was premature. He had stem-cell therapy in late 2014, and by October 2015 he announced that while the cancer is still there he was doing much better using immunotherapy, undergoing treatment every three weeks with pembrolizumab. In 2023, he announced that the pembrolizumab was waning in effectiveness and chemotherapy had been added to his recent treatments.

In 2025, Campbell declared that he was in remission after 12 years, but on 19 August 2026, he announced that the cancer had returned.

== Rallying ==
Campbell competes in the American Rally Association championship since 2021.He has accumulated 0 wins and 20 points since his first entry, with his most recent entry being in the 2026 Olympus Rally in Washington State. In 2026, the film Vivian Campbell: Between Stages was released about his love of rally car racing and was an official selection at the 2026 New Hampshire Film Festival and the International Motoring Film Awards in Los Angeles, CA.

== Discography ==
=== Studio albums ===
- Two Sides of If (2005)

=== with Sweet Savage ===
- "Take No Prisoners"/"Killing Time" (1981)
- "Whiskey in the Jar" (2009)

=== with Dio ===
- Holy Diver (1983)
- The Last in Line (1984)
- Sacred Heart (1985)
- The Dio E.P. (1986)
- Intermission (1986)
- At Donington UK: Live 1983 & 1987 (2010)

=== with Hear 'N Aid ===
- "Stars", "Hungry for Heaven" (1986)

=== with Whitesnake ===
- "Give Me All Your Love ('88 Mix)" (1988)

=== with Riverdogs ===
- Riverdogs (1990)
- World Gone Mad (2011)
- California (2017)

=== with Shadow King ===
- Shadow King (1991)

=== with Def Leppard ===
- Retro Active (1993)
- Vault: Def Leppard Greatest Hits (1980–1995) (1995)
- Slang (1996)
- Euphoria (1999)
- X (2002)
- Yeah! (2006)
- Songs from the Sparkle Lounge (2008)
- Mirror Ball – Live & More (2011)
- Viva! Hysteria (2013)
- Def Leppard (2015)
- Diamond Star Halos (2022)

=== with Bunny Brunel ===
- Bunny Brunel's L.A. Zoo (1998)

=== with Clock ===
- Through Time (1998)

=== with Last in Line ===
- Heavy Crown (2016)
- II (2019)
- Jericho (2023)

=== Guest appearances ===
- "Desperate" acoustic guitar (from the Vixen album, Vixen) (1989)
- "Broken Dreams", "Hangin' on My Hip", "Day One" guitars (from the Lou Gramm album, Long Hard Look) (1989)
- "Firedance", "Get Down" lead guitar (from the Gotthard album, Gotthard) (1992)
- "Gangbang at the Old Folks Home" guitar solo (from the Steel Panther album, All You Can Eat) (2014)
