= Vinny Appice =

American drummer (born 1957)

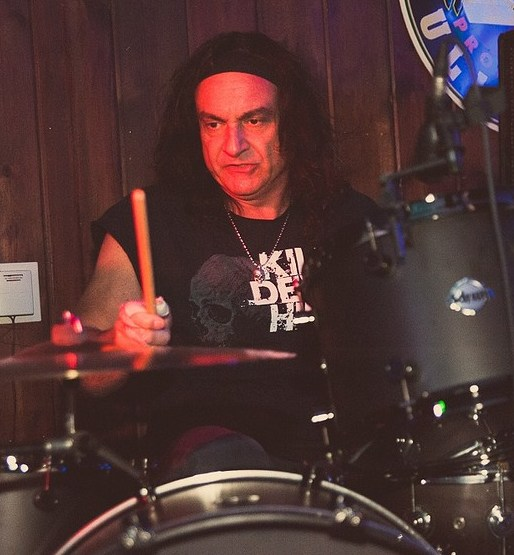
- Appice in 2012

Background information
- Born: Vincent Samson Appice; September 13, 1957 (age 69); Brooklyn, New York, U.S.
- Genres: Heavy metal; hard rock
- Occupation: Drummer
- Years active: 1974-present
- Website: vinnyappice.com

Vincent Samson Appice (/ˈæpəsiː/ APP-ə-see, born September 13, 1957) is an American rock and metal drummer best known for his work with the bands Dio, Black Sabbath, and Heaven & Hell. He is the younger brother of drummer Carmine Appice.

== Career ==
=== Pre-Black Sabbath ===
Appice took up the drums at the age of nine, taking lessons from the same teacher as his brother Carmine Appice. When he was sixteen, Appice and his band BOMF met John Lennon at Record Plant Studios. Lennon took a liking to the group and used them as a backing band in several performances, including the final one before his death. Appice moved on to record with Rick Derringer on Derringer (1976), Sweet Evil (1977), and Derringer Live (1977), before forming his own band Axis and recording It's A Circus World (1978).

=== Black Sabbath ===
Appice joined Black Sabbath during the tour in support of the band's Heaven and Hell album in 1980. Sharon Arden had approached him with an offer to join Ozzy Osbourne's new band but he turned it down at the urging of his older brother Carmine. About a month later he was approached by Black Sabbath, whose longtime drummer Bill Ward had just departed mid-tour to deal with personal issues. Appice was told over the phone that Ward was "missing in action", and he subsequently met with Tony Iommi and the pair hit it off. Iommi was a fan of Appice's work on Axis' It's A Circus World and he invited Appice to meet the rest of the band and rehearse in Los Angeles the following day. When he initially joined Black Sabbath, he was expected to only complete the tour, as it was anticipated that Ward would return at some point.

Appice's first show with Black Sabbath was at the Aloha Stadium in Hawaii. Though he had rehearsed the songs in Los Angeles before leaving for Hawaii, he was forced to use hastily written crib notes on stage for each unfamiliar song. "The endings were a bit sloppy and long, but as the tour went on it got tighter and tighter," Appice recalled of his early days in the band. After several months it became apparent that Ward would not be returning, and Appice became the band's permanent drummer. He subsequently appeared on the 1981 Black Sabbath studio album Mob Rules and the 1982 live album Live Evil.

=== Dio ===
In late 1982, vocalist Ronnie James Dio left Black Sabbath and asked Appice if he would be interested in forming a new band with him. Though Appice was still a member of Black Sabbath, he and Dio lived in the same town in New York and the two had a close relationship. As Sabbath were based in England, Appice thought it would be more convenient to stay in the United States and work with Dio, and the band Dio was soon formed along with Vivian Campbell and Jimmy Bain. He recorded the albums Holy Diver (1983), The Last in Line (1984), Sacred Heart (1985), Intermission (1986), and Dream Evil (1987) with the band. In December 1989, Appice left Dio and briefly teamed up with ex-Dokken bassist Jeff Pilson in the short-lived band Flesh & Blood.

=== Post-Dio ===
Ronnie James Dio rejoined Black Sabbath in 1992 to record the album Dehumanizer. The band were working with drummer Cozy Powell, but Powell was unable to record after falling off a horse and breaking his pelvis. They immediately called Appice, who flew to Wales to rehearse and record with the band. "I like Vinny, he's a nice chap," Tony Iommi said of the reunion. "Vinny was asked to continue with the Sabbath thing (in 1982), but he didn't. I like Vinny's playing."

Appice rejoined Dio and they recorded Strange Highways (1994) and Angry Machines (1996). Prior to the 1996 tour, Appice played drums for Las Vegas–based guitarist, Raven Storm, on his album The Storm Project, which also involved long-time Dio engineer and producer, Angelo Arcuri. Arcuri was also a childhood friend of the Appice brothers.

In 2005 Appice appeared on a rap recording by Circle of Tyrants, whose lineup included Necro, Ill Bill, Goretex, and Mr Hyde, also collaborating with Alex Skolnick. Appice played two shows in Las Vegas with the Sin City Sinners in October 2009. Appice rejoined his Black Sabbath bandmates Ronnie James Dio, Geezer Butler, and Tony Iommi in 2006 as Heaven & Hell, touring and releasing one studio album, The Devil You Know, before Dio's death in 2010.

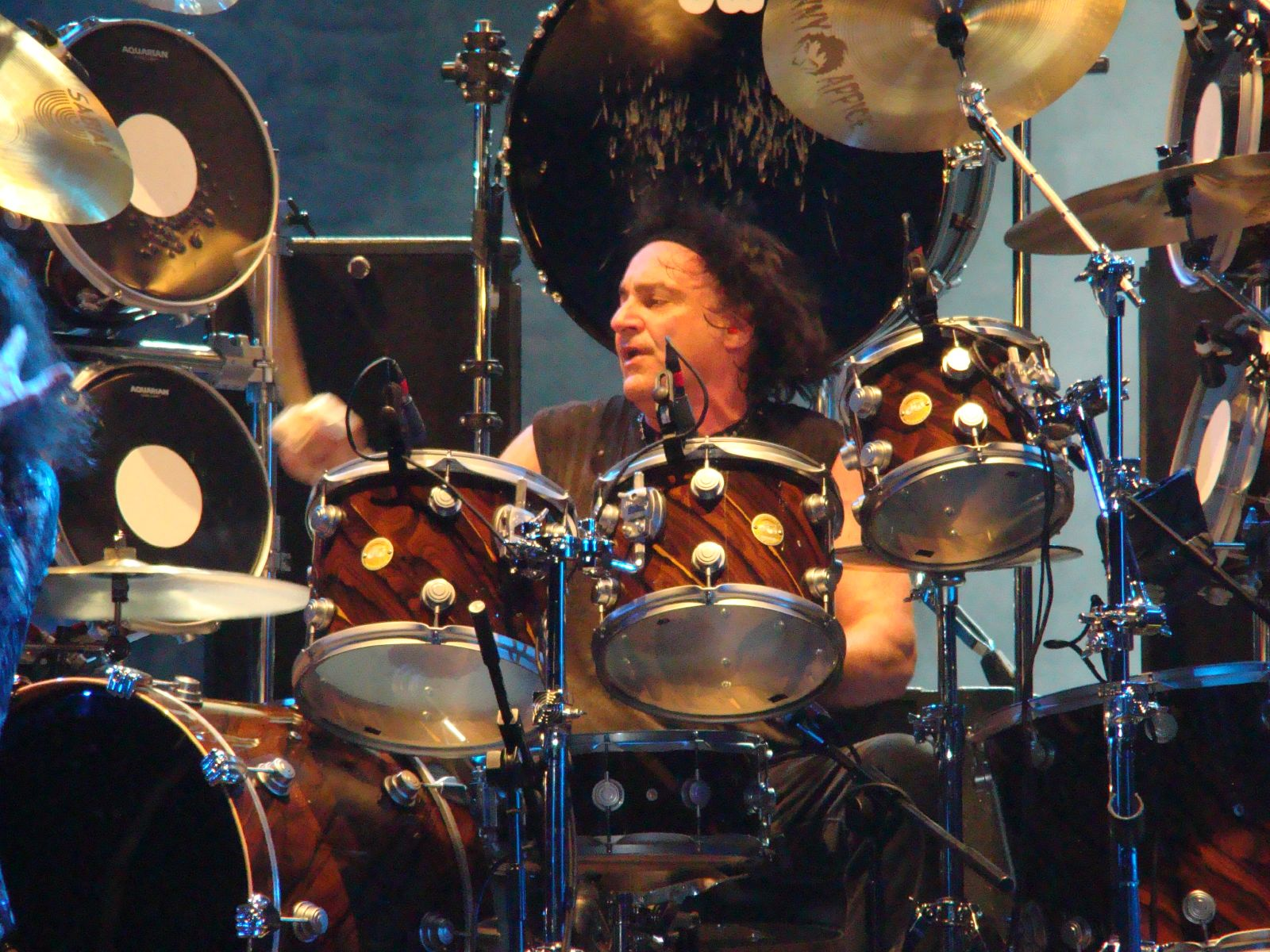
Appice with Heaven & Hell in 2007

In 2006 he recorded the CD Dinosaurs, together with Carl Sentance, Carlos Cavazo and Jeff Pilson. The CD was produced by guitarist-musician Andy Menario (leader of Martiria band) and featured lyrics written by Italian poet Marco Roberto Capelli, who is also Martiria's lyricist.

He is currently participating in "Drum Wars" shows with his brother Carmine, which feature a guest appearance from vocalist Paul Shortino.

Appice formed the band Kill Devil Hill with former Down and Pantera bassist Rex Brown, guitar slinger Mark Zavon and lead vocalist Dewey Bragg. Kill Devil Hill's self-titled debut album was released May 22, 2012, via Steamhammer/SPV and landed at No. 9 on the Billboard Top New Artist Albums (HeatSeekers) Chart, No. 41 on the Top Hard Music Chart and No. 50 on the Independent Album Chart.

Following the death of Dio frontman Ronnie James Dio in 2010, the original lineup of Vinny Appice on drums, Jimmy Bain on bass, Vivian Campbell on guitar and Claude Schnell on keyboards reunited along with vocalist Andrew Freeman to perform covers of Dio songs they originally recorded. This lineup, without Schnell, would become Last in Line.

On November 25, 2013, it was announced that Appice had formed a new band called WAMI, which features vocalist Doogie White, bassist Marco Mendoza, and 16-year-old Polish guitarist Iggy Gwadera. On February 12, 2014, the upcoming album title was revealed to be Kill the King, due for release in the spring. On February 25, the album cover and track listing were revealed.

On March 10, 2014, it was announced that Appice had left Kill Devil Hill, and that former Type O Negative drummer Johnny Kelly was his replacement.

Last in Line began recording tracks for a new album of original material in April 2014, followed by the release of a snippet of the new track "Devil in Me" in June. The album, Heavy Crown, produced by former Dio bassist Jeff Pilson, was released in early 2016. The band has since released further albums.

In early 2014 Appice joined hard rock band Hollywood Monsters where he played on the album Big Trouble (on 8 tracks out of 11) which was released in 2014 on Mausoleum Records. The album features Steph Honde on vocals and guitars, Tim Bogert on bass, Don Airey on keyboards and Paul Di'Anno on lead vocals on the bonus track. The same year, Appice was a guest performer on Eli Cook's album, Primitive Son.

In 2015, it was announced that Appice would appear on the EP "Mainly Songs About Robots" by Australian progressive rock band Toehider, to be released in September 2015. The same year, Appice was invited to play drums for a new project of Whitesnake and former Night Ranger guitarist Joel Hoekstra, called Joel Hoekstra's 13, with an album called Dying to Live, released on October 16.

On September 30, the band Resurrection Kings was announced. The band is formed by Appice with former Dio guitarist Craig Goldy, Sean McNabb on bass and Chas West on vocals.

On January 18, 2017, Appice was inducted into the Hall of Heavy Metal History for his contributions to Heavy Metal drumming.

In 2023, Vinny put together a new touring band called Sabbath Knights, performing the music of Black Sabbath and Dio.

In 2026, Appice played drums on Tone Raider's debut album The Illusion Machine.

Vinny is a frequent counselor at Rock_'n_Roll_Fantasy_Camp.

== Discography ==
=== John Lennon ===
- Walls and Bridges (hand claps on "Whatever Gets You Thru the Night"; uncredited) (1974)

=== Rick Derringer ===
- Derringer (1976)
- Sweet Evil (1977)
- Derringer Live (1977)

=== Axis ===
- It's A Circus World (1978)

=== Ray Gomez ===
- Volume (1980)

=== Black Sabbath ===
- Mob Rules (1981)
- Live Evil (1982)
- Dehumanizer (1992)
- Black Sabbath: The Dio Years (2007)
- Live at Hammersmith Odeon (2007)

=== Dio ===
- Holy Diver (1983)
- The Last in Line (1984)
- Sacred Heart (1985)
- Intermission (1986)
- Dream Evil (1987)
- Strange Highways (1993)
- Angry Machines (1996)
- Inferno – Last in Live (1998)

=== Hear 'N Aid ===
- Hear 'n Aid – "Stars" (1986)

=== World War III ===
- World War III (1990)

=== War & Peace ===
- The Flesh & Blood Sessions (1999 / 2013)

=== Raven Storm ===
- The Storm Project (2001)

=== Mark Boals ===
- Edge of the World (2002)

=== Power Project ===
- Dinosaurs (2006)

=== 3 Legged Dogg ===
- Frozen Summer (2006)

=== Heaven and Hell ===
- Live from Radio City Music Hall (2007)
- The Devil You Know (2009)
- Neon Nights: 30 Years of Heaven & Hell (2010)

=== Kill Devil Hill ===
- Kill Devil Hill (2012)
- Revolution Rise (2013)

=== Suncrown ===
- "Children of the Sea" (Black Sabbath cover) (2012)

=== Hollywood Monsters ===
- Big Trouble (2014)
- Capture the Sun (2016)

=== WAMI ===
- Kill the King (2014)

=== Martiria ===
- Revolution (2014)

=== Toehider ===
- Mainly Songs About Robots (2015)

=== Dunsmuir ===
- Dunsmuir (2016)

=== Ian Ray Logan & Serpent's Ride ===
- Between Lights and Shadows (2016)

=== Joel Hoekstra's 13 ===
- Dying to Live (2015)
- Running Games (2021)

=== Stonehand ===
- When the Devil Comes (2015)

=== Resurrection Kings ===
- Resurrection Kings (2016)

=== Last in Line ===
- Heavy Crown (2016)
- II (2019)
- Jericho (2023)

=== Ian Ray Logan & King of Twilight ===
- Reaching Dreams (on "Success Is to Live (the Life)") (2017)

=== Adrian Raso ===
- Frozen in Time (2017)

=== The One Man Electrical Band ===
- Symptom of the Universe (2017)
- Dark Things (2018)

=== Appice ===
- Sinister (2017) (with his brother Carmine Appice)

=== Stagma ===
- Stagma (2018)

=== Concreto (Brazilian Band) ===
- Lama EP (2018)

=== Leviathan Project ===
- MCMLXXXII (2024)
