= Jimmy Bain =

Scottish bassist (1947–2016)

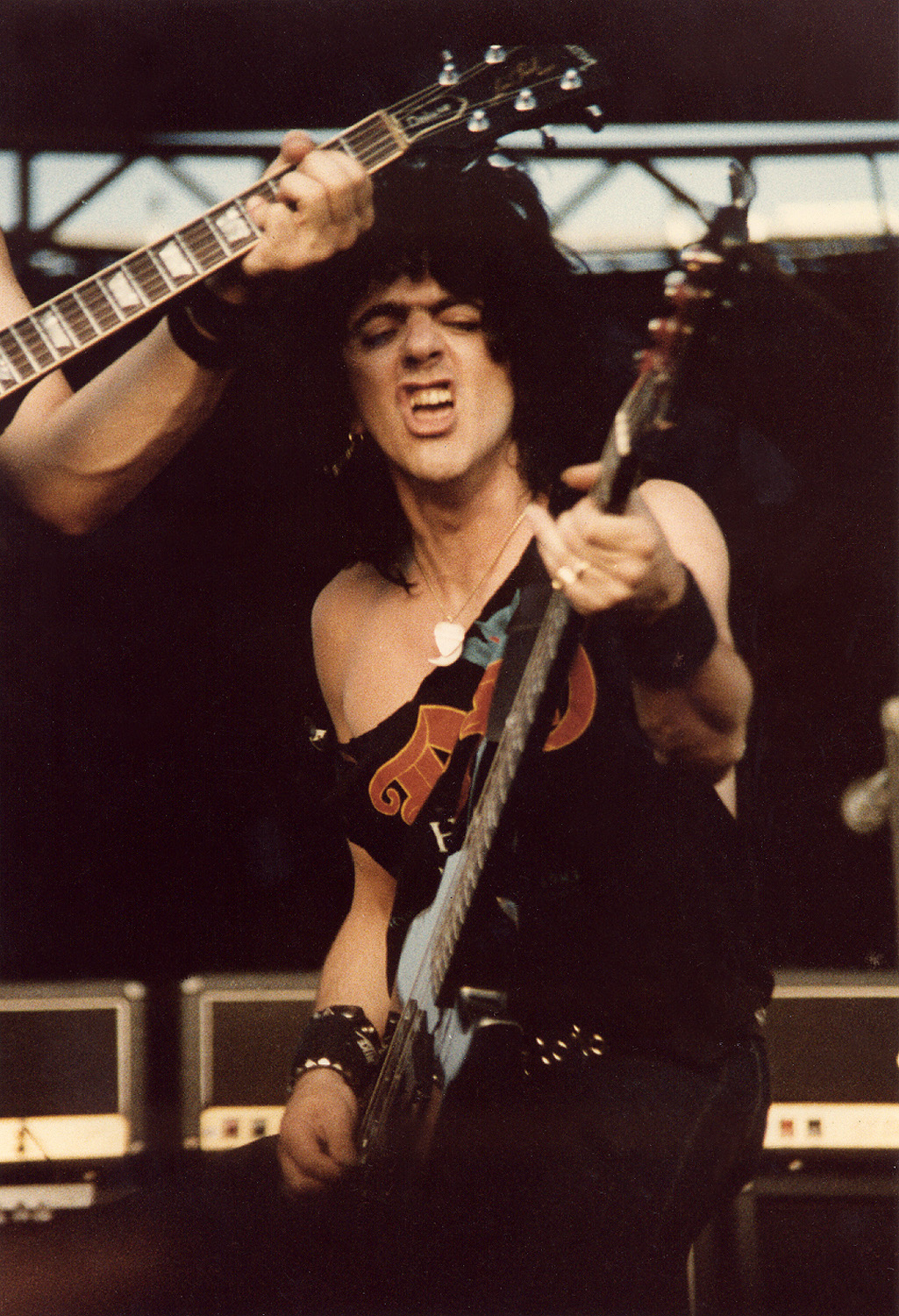
- Bain performing in 1983

Background information
- Born: James Stewart Bain; 19 December 1947; Newtonmore, Highland, Scotland
- Died: 23 January 2016 (aged 68) The Bahamas
- Genres: Hard rock; blues rock; heavy metal
- Occupations: Musician; songwriter; singer
- Instruments: Bass; keyboards; vocals; guitar
- Years active: 1975–2016

James Stewart Bain (19 December 1947 – 23 January 2016) was a Scottish musician, best known for playing bass guitar in the bands Rainbow and Dio. He also worked with Kate Bush and Thin Lizzy frontman Phil Lynott, co-writing on his solo albums.

== Early life ==
Bain was born in Newtonmore, Badenoch and Strathspey, Highland, and played in several provincial amateur bands as a young teen. His parents and older brothers relocated to Vancouver. By this point, he was playing professionally in Street Noise. However, he did join his family for a brief stay in Canada. Before returning to Scotland, getting his band Harlot and then hitting the London music scene, Bain joined Harlot in early 1974, after turning down a job with The Babys.

== Career ==
=== Early career ===
Bain was asked to join Rainbow after Ritchie Blackmore had watched him performing at The Marquee in London. He recorded the studio album Rising with them and played on their following world tour. While on the tour, he played on Rainbow's first live album, On Stage. In January 1977, Bain was sacked from the band. He then toured Europe with Velvet Underground's John Cale.

=== Wild Horses ===
In 1978, Bain formed a band called Wild Horses. Jimmy was the lead vocalist, songwriter, as well as bassist for the band, which also included ex-Thin Lizzy guitarist Brian Robertson, drummer Clive Edwards (Pat Travers, Uli Jon Roth's Electric Sun) and guitarist Neil Carter (who went on to UFO and Gary Moore). Wild Horses released two albums on EMI in Europe, Wild Horses (1980) and Stand Your Ground (1981), the latter featuring John Lockton (ex-The Next Band) in place of Carter, before Robertson and Edwards both left in June 1981. Robertson joined Motörhead the following year while Edwards joined former Whitesnake guitarist Bernie Marsden's S.O.S.

Bain regrouped Wild Horses as a five-piece with ex-Lautrec members Reuben Archer (vocals) and Laurence Archer (guitar), and The Next Band's Frank Noon (drums), but they disbanded shortly after. Jimmy then worked with the former Family main-man Roger Chapman, Roy Harper, Gary Moore, and Kate Bush (on 1982's The Dreaming).

Bain co-wrote with his close friend Phil Lynott for the Lizzy man's two solo albums. A keyboard player as well as a bassist, he toured the material playing keyboards with Lynott's band. Their song, "Old Town" was re-recorded by The Corrs in 1999, and became a big hit worldwide.

He was secretly brought in by the German hard rockers Scorpions to play bass guitar on their 1984 album Love at First Sting. The leader of the band, rhythm guitarist Rudolf Schenker, wanted him to join the Scorpions as full-time bassist, but their management wanted to keep the line-up German, so Francis Buchholz was brought back and Bain's bass tracks were said to be deleted.

=== Dio ===
In late 1982, Bain linked up again with ex-Rainbow vocalist Ronnie James Dio for the band Dio. A central figure within Dio, Bain co-wrote "Rainbow in the Dark", "Holy Diver" and two additional songs which appear on their 1983 released first album, Holy Diver. Bain co-wrote several other songs for the following albums, The Last in Line (1984), Sacred Heart (1985), Intermission (1986), Dream Evil (1987) and Killing the Dragon (2002).

In the mid-1980s, when the entertainment community became active in drawing attention to world charities, Bain founded Hear 'n Aid, a foundation in which he could involve the rock community to help eliminate world hunger. He also co-wrote the song, "Stars," with Vivian Campbell and Ronnie James Dio, which became the Heavy Rock world's answer to "We Are The World". "Stars" provided a major contribution to the famine relief charity appeal. Bain donated all of his shares of the proceeds to one of his favourite charities, Children of the Night.

In autumn 1989, Bain left Dio during the recording of Lock Up the Wolves (an album he does not appear on) and formed a band with vocalist Mandy Lion called World War III, but after their 1990 eponymous debut album, the band floundered. Bain's solo project The Key utilised a far more melodic and commercial approach. Guitarist on the project was Tracy G, borrowed from Dio's band, who was also the guitarist for World War III. Ronnie James Dio's concept project Magica (2000) saw Bain's return to the Dio lineup, and he played on the albums Magica and Killing the Dragon.

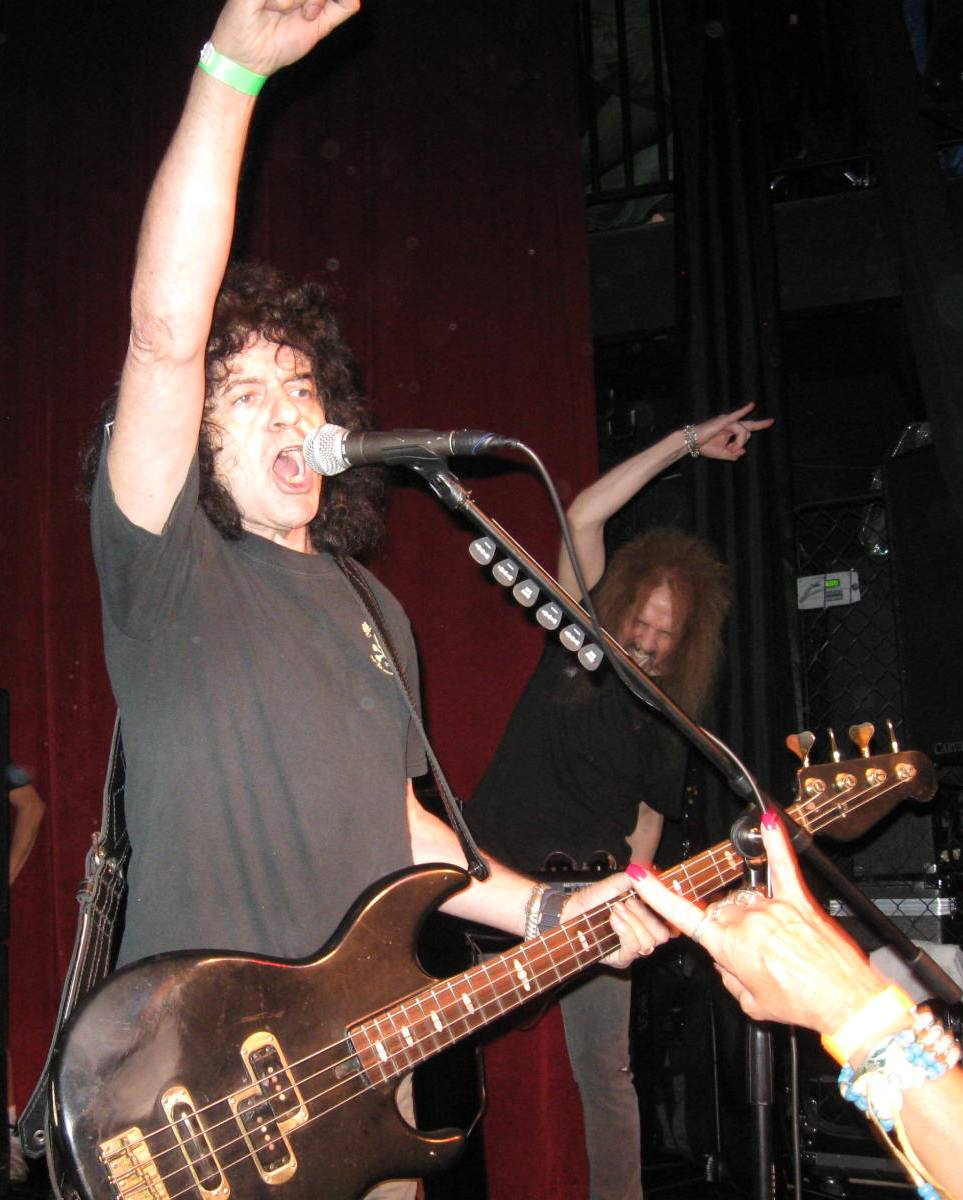
Last in Line band, Jimmy Bain and Claude Schnell, Ramona, CA, October, 2013

In 2005, Bain again joined forces with former Black Sabbath and Dio drummer, Vinny Appice, for two projects, The Hollywood All Starz and 3 Legged Dogg. While the Hollywood All Starz performed live concerts featuring greatest hits sets of the individual members, (Carlos Cavazo of Quiet Riot was another notable member of the band), 3 Legged Dogg produced a well received album of original material. In an interview with journalist, David Lee Wilson, Bain lamented Appice's eventual choice to leave both these groups so that he could tour with Ronnie James Dio in the Black Sabbath offshoot, Heaven and Hell.

=== Later career ===
Bain toured with Hollywood Allstarz, a supergroup featuring a number of 1980s metal stars. The group has included former members of Giuffria, Quiet Riot, and Lynch Mob. The band Last in Line was put together in 2013 comprising Bain, Viv Campbell, Vinny Appice, Claude Schnell and Andrew Freeman. That line-up (excluding singer Freeman) were the original songwriters and performers on the early classic Dio albums, and so intended to play gigs and to perform those songs. Bain was in court-mandated rehabilitation during the recording sessions for their album Heavy Crown with a curfew that ordered that he return daily before 10 p.m.

== Personal life ==
In 1979, Bain married Lady Sophia Crichton-Stuart, daughter of John Crichton-Stuart, 6th Marquess of Bute. They had one daughter, Samantha Ella Bain, born in 1981 (for whom Phil Lynott and John Sykes' song "Samantha" was written). The couple divorced (shortly before Bain left Dio) in 1988.

== Death ==
On 23 January 2016, Jimmy Bain died while in his cabin on Def Leppard's "Hysteria on the High Seas" cruise. He was due to perform on the cruise with his group Last In Line the following day. The performance did not go ahead, and band members informed fans on the cruise that he had been battling pneumonia for some time. The cause of death was determined to be lung cancer. Bain had not been diagnosed with cancer and was aware only of his pneumonia. He is interred in Forest Lawn Memorial Park (Hollywood Hills), not far from his bandmate Ronnie James Dio.

== Discography ==
=== With Rainbow ===
- Rising (1976)
- On Stage (1977)
- Live in Germany (1990, recorded September 1976)

=== With Mike Montgomery ===
- Solo (1976)

=== With David Kubinec ===
- Some Things Never Change (1978)

=== With Thin Lizzy ===
- Black Rose: A Rock Legend (1979)

=== With Phil Lynott ===
- Solo in Soho (1980)
- The Philip Lynott Album (1982)

=== With Kate Bush ===
- The Dreaming (1982)

=== With Wild Horses ===
- Wild Horses (1980)
- Stand Your Ground (1981)

=== With Gary Moore ===
- Dirty Fingers (1983)

=== With Dio ===
- Holy Diver (1983)
- The Last in Line (1984)
- Sacred Heart (1985)
- Intermission (1986)
- Dream Evil (1987)
- Magica (2000)
- Killing the Dragon (2002)

=== With World War III ===
- World War III (1991)

=== With 3 Legged Dogg ===
- Frozen Summer (2006)

=== With Last in Line ===
- Heavy Crown (2016)
