= Mean Streak (album) =

Studio album by Y&T
- Released: September 1983
- Recorded: 1983
- Genre: Hard rock, heavy metal, glam metal
- Length: 41:02
- Label: A&M
- Producer: Chris Tsangarides

Y&T chronology
Black Tiger (1982)	Mean Streak (1983)	In Rock We Trust (1984)

Singles from Mean Streak
- 1. "Mean Streak" Released: 1983

Mean Streak is the fifth studio album by American heavy metal band Y&T, released in 1983 through A&M Records. Tracks include "Midnight in Tokyo" (inspired by the band's live show in Tokyo), "Sentimental Fool", and the opening track, "Mean Streak". The album peaked at number 103 on the Billboard 200 on October 27, 1983. This was the third of five studio albums released by A&M Records for Y&T. A remastered version was released on CD by Rock Candy Records in July 2018.

== Critical reception ==
Professional ratings
Review scores
Source	Rating
AllMusic	2.5/5 stars
Metal Forces	7/10

Loudwire ranked the album at number 28 on their list of the Top 30 hair metal albums. AllMusic said the hard rock album was a disappointment to the band's fans who knew that their live shows were much better. Metal Forces and Blabbermouth.net called out the combination of hard rock and heavy metal songs on the album, with Blabbermouth praising the title track as the band's best song.

== Track listing ==
All tracks are written by Y&T.

Side one
No.	Title	Length
1.	"Mean Streak"	4:06
2.	"Straight Thru the Heart"	4:14
3.	"Lonely Side of Town"	4:48
4.	"Midnight in Tokyo"	5:41

Side two
No.	Title	Length
5.	"Breaking Away"	4:42
6.	"Hang 'Em High"	5:30
7.	"Take You to the Limit"	4:57
8.	"Sentimental Fool"	3:11
9.	"Down and Dirty"	3:54

== Personnel ==
=== Y&T ===
- Dave Meniketti – lead guitar, lead vocals
- Joey Alves – rhythm guitar, backing vocals
- Phil Kennemore – bass, backing vocals, Moog Taurus pedals
- Leonard Haze – drums, percussion

=== Production ===
- Chris Tsangarides – producer, first engineer
- Mike Herbick, Richie Corsello – second engineers
- Nigel James – arranger
- Scott Boorey – assistant engineer
- Bernie Grundman – mastering
- Chuck Beeson – art direction
- John Taylor Dismukes – front cover illustration
- Mike Fink – rear cover design
- Larry Du Pont – rear cover photo tinting

== Charts ==
Chart (1983)	Peak position
Swedish Albums (Sverigetopplistan)	26
UK Albums (OCC)	35
US Billboard 200	103
