= Diezel =

German guitar amplifier manufacturer

Diezel Amplification GmbH
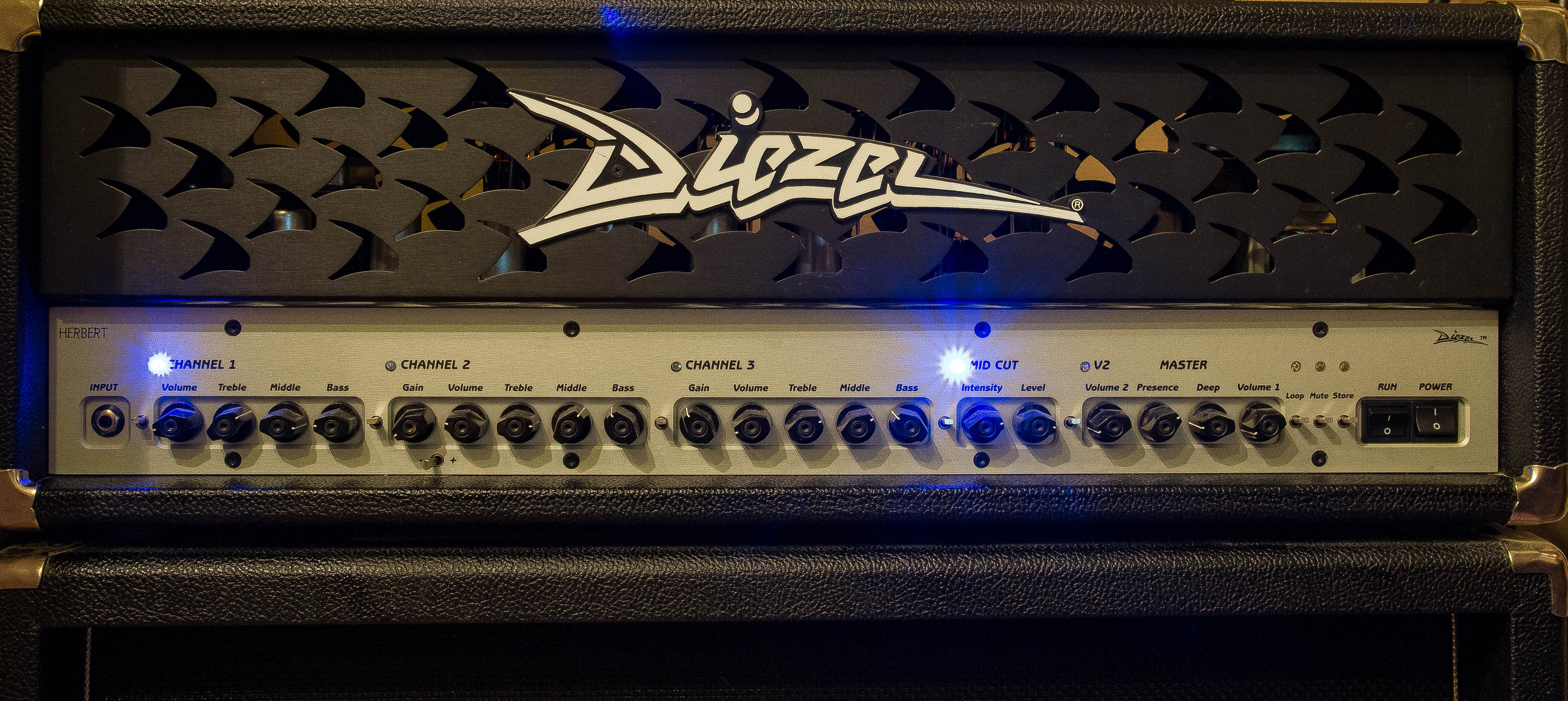
- Type: Private
- Industry: Amplification
- Founded: Bad Steben, Germany (1992; 34 years ago)
- Founder: Peter Diezel and Peter Stapfer
- Headquarters: Bad Steben, Germany
- Key people: Peter Diezel and Peter Stapfer
- Products: guitar amplifiers
- Website: diezelamplification.com

Diezel Amplification GmbH is a company based in Bad Steben, Germany, founded by Peter Diezel and Peter Stapfer, that builds high-end guitar amplifiers. The company was established in 1992.

== Current amplifier models ==
Model	Preamp	Poweramp	Loops	Dimensions	Mass	Form factor(s)	Output
VH-X	4-channel, 99 storable presets, 10 assignable DFX	Mono, 4 tubes	3: 1 switchable pre-loop, 2 switchable fx loops	23.5 x 11.5 x 11.5 in	53 lb (24 kg)	Head	100W
VH4	4-channel	Mono, 4 tubes	4 channel inserts, serial and parallel master loops	29 × 11 × 11 in 74 × 28 × 28 cm	50 lb (23 kg)	Head	90 — 160W
VH4S	4-channel	Stereo, 4 tubes	4 channel inserts, serial and parallel master loops	29 × 11 × 11 in 74 × 28 × 28 cm	50 lb (23 kg)	Head	2 × 50W
VH2	2-channel	Mono, 4 tubes	series; non midi switchable	29 × 11 × 11 in 74 × 28 × 28 cm	51 lb (23 kg)	Head	100W
Herbert	3-channel	Mono, 6 tubes	1 parallel, 1 insert loops, 1 switchable insert loop	29 × 11 × 11 in 74 × 28 × 28 cm	60 lb (27 kg)	Head	180W
Hagen	4-channel	Mono, 4 tubes	1 parallel, 1 insert loops, 1 switchable insert loop	29 × 11 × 11 in 74 × 28 × 28 cm	53 lb (24 kg)	Head	100W
D-Moll	2,5-channel (channels 2 and 3 share the tone stack)	Mono, 4 tubes	series and parallel; both sends are midi switchable	23 × 12 × 11 in 59 × 29,5 × 27 cm	51 lb (23 kg)	Head	100W
Lil Fokker	2-channel; non midi switchable	Mono, 4 tubes	series; non midi switchable	29 × 11 × 11 in 74 × 28 × 28 cm	51 lb (23 kg)	Head	100W
Schmidt	3 ECC83, 1 ECC81 2-channel class A with boost	Mono, 2 tubes	TBA serial and parallel loop, switchable reverb for both channels	20 × 12 × 12 in 50 × 30 × 31 cm	48,5 lb (22 kg)	Head	15-30W
Lucy (bass amp)	TBA	up to 8 EL34 500 Watts RMS	TBA parallel and serial loop	TBA	TBA	Head	TBA

- 6L6, EL34, 5881, 6550, KT66, KT88, etc. can be used.

== Out of production amplifier models ==
Model	Preamp	Poweramp	Loops	Dimensions	Mass	Form factor(s)	Output
Einstein	2-channel	Mono, 2 or 4 tubes	1 parallel, 1 serial	Combo: 59 × 45 × 30 cm Head: 59 × 25 × 30 cm	Combo: (31 kg) Head: 50W (19 kg), 100W (21 kg)	Head; Combo	50W, 100W; 50W

== Cabinets ==
Diezel offers 4x12 and 2x12 cabinets in front or rear loaded configurations. The front loaded cabinets come standard with V30 or G12K100 speakers while the rear loaded cabinets come standard with a Hemp cone speaker. All cabinets are now made in Germany with black grill cloth.

== Bands and artists ==
The following bands and artists use or have used Diezel Amps: Killswitch Engage, Adam Jones of Tool, Matt Bellamy of Muse, Metallica, Dave Meniketti of Y&T, Billy Corgan, Nine Inch Nails, Guns N' Roses, Slipknot, Ian D'Sa of Billy Talent, Brent Hinds and Bill Kelliher of Mastodon, Korn, Wes Borland of Limp Bizkit, Mike Mushok of Staind, Greg O'Shea of The Prophecy, Within Temptation, Neal Schon, Buckethead, Dir En Grey, Ayabie, George Lynch, Godsmack, Mark Tremonti, Genghis Tron, Shinedown, Myles Kennedy of Alter Bridge, Miles Holmwood of Stereos, Weezer, Dave Cee of The Meese Commission, Warren DeMartini, The Arusha Accord, Tadashi, Steve Robello of Dublin Death Patrol and Barry Stock of Three Days Grace.
