= In Rock We Trust =

Studio album by Y&T
- Released: July 1984
- Studio: Fantasy (Berkeley, California)
- Genres: Hard rock, heavy metal, glam metal
- Length: 43:20
- Label: A&M
- Producer: Tom "Colonel" Allom

Y&T chronology
Mean Streak (1983)	In Rock We Trust (1984)	Open Fire (1985)

Singles from In Rock We Trust
- 1. "Don't Stop Runnin'" Released: 1984

Professional ratings
Review scores
Source	Rating
AllMusic	2.5/5 stars

In Rock We Trust is the sixth studio album by American hard rock/heavy metal band Y&T, released in 1984 through A&M Records. The album became the band's highest charting album at the time, reaching No. 46 on the Billboard 200 chart.

This album was remastered and re-released on the band's official website in 2006. This edition also includes the studio version of "Go for the Throat", which had never before appeared on a Y&T album. The song originally appeared in live form on 1985's Open Fire album, and was the B-side of their "All American Boy" single. It also appeared on the 1986 hunger benefit Hear 'n Aid compilation album Stars.

== Track listing ==
All lyrics are written by Phil Kennemore and Geoffrey Leib, except where stated; all music is composed by Y&T and Geoffrey Leib.

Side one
No.	Title	Lyrics	Length
1.	"Rock & Roll's Gonna Save the World"		4:39
2.	"Life, Life, Life"		4:38
3.	"Masters and Slaves"		3:58
4.	"I'll Keep on Believin' (Do You Know)"	Y&T, Leib, and Benjamin "Bennie" La Barge	3:50
5.	"Break Out Tonight!"		4:23

Side two
No.	Title	Lyrics	Length
6.	"Lipstick and Leather"	Y&T, Leib, and Benjamin "Bennie" La Barge	3:25
7.	"Don't Stop Runnin'"		4:20
8.	"(Your Love Is) Drivin' Me Crazy"		4:57
9.	"She's a Liar"		3:34
10.	"This Time"		5:36

== Personnel ==
Band members

- Dave Meniketti – lead vocals, lead guitar
- Joey Alves – rhythm guitar, backing vocals
- Phil Kennemore – bass, backing vocals
- Leonard Haze – drums, percussion

Production

- Recorded and mixed at Fantasy Studios, Berkeley, California
- Tom Allom – producer
- Andy DeGanahl – engineer, mixing
- David Luke, Buddy Thornton – assistant engineers
- John Taylor Dismukes – illustration
- Chuck Beeson – art direction

== Charts ==
Chart (1984)	Peak position
Canada Top Albums/CDs (RPM)	78
Dutch Albums (Album Top 100)	43
Swedish Albums (Sverigetopplistan)	16
UK Albums (Official Charts)	33
US Billboard 200	45
