= Summertime Girls =

1985 single by Y&T

Single by Y&T

from the album Open Fire
- B-side: "Summertime Girls (live version)"
- Released: 1985
- Recorded: 1985
- Genre: Glam metal
- Length: 3:27
- Label: A&M
- Songwriters: Y&T
- Producer: Kevin Beamish

Y&T singles chronology
"Don't Stop Running" (1984)	"Summertime Girls" (1985)	"All American Boy" (1985)

"Summertime Girls" is a single by American rock band Y&T. It was released as the first single from their first live album Open Fire. It later reappeared on their seventh studio album Down for the Count. The song became the band's biggest hit, as well as their first and only single to chart on the Billboard Hot 100, peaking at number 55. It also reached No. 16 on the Mainstream Rock songs chart.

== Music video ==
The music video starts off with a homeless person looking through a garbage can at a beach, upon which drummer Leonard Haze emerges from the garbage pile. The video then cuts to vocalist Dave Meniketti and bassist Phil Kennemore coming out of a small cave, and then to guitarist Joey Alves emerging from the sand after being discovered by a man with a metal detector. All four members then meet up as a large crowd approach the beach, when four girls, all dressed in black leather clothing with chains emerge from the crowd, who are seen throughout the video as the band continue hang about the beach. As everyone leaves the beach at sunset, the four girls walk up to the band and walk off with them.

The music video was directed by Rick Friedberg.

== Track listing ==
7" single (US)

Side A
No.	Title	Writer(s)	Length
1.	"Summertime Girls (Studio version)"	Y&T	3:27

Side B
No.	Title	Writer(s)	Length
1.	"Summertime Girls (Live version)"	Y&T	4:59

7" single (UK)

Side A
No.	Title	Writer(s)	Length
1.	"Summertime Girls"	Y&T	3:27

Side B
No.	Title	Writer(s)	Length
1.	"Lipstick & Leather"	Y&T	3:25

== In other media ==
The song makes an appearance in the 1985 sci-fi comedy film Real Genius.

The song was featured in the first episode of the HBO Max series Peacemaker.

== Charts ==
Chart performance for "Summertime Girls"
Chart (1985)	Peak position
US Billboard Hot 100	55
US Mainstream Rock (Billboard)	16
