= Black Tiger (album) =

Studio album by Y&T
- Released: August 24, 1982
- Recorded: 1982
- Studio: Ridge Farm Studio, Rusper, England
- Genre: Hard rock
- Length: 38:15
- Label: A&M
- Producer: Max Norman

Y&T chronology
Earthshaker (1981)	Black Tiger (1982)	Mean Streak (1983)

Professional ratings
Review scores
Source	Rating
Allmusic	2.5/5 stars

Black Tiger is the fourth studio album by American hard rock band Y&T, released in 1982 through A&M Records. It was recorded at Ridge Farm, in Dorking, County of Surrey, England and produced by Max Norman. The classic Y&T logo makes its first appearance on the cover of this record.

AllMusic named Black Tiger as an extreme disappointment for the band, following the excellent Earthshaker. Eduardo Rivadavia wrote that the songs sound "lifeless" and producer Max Norman is "clueless" about hard rock. The band is blamed for "uneven songwriting": "for every winning track they present Y&T always manages to follow it with a total stinker." A remastered version was released on CD in July 2018 by Rock Candy Records.

== Track listing ==
Side one
No.	Title	Length
1.	"From the Moon" (Instrumental)	0:42
2.	"Open Fire"	4:10
3.	"Don't Wanna Lose"	4:09
4.	"Hell or High Water"	3:44
5.	"Forever"	5:47

Side two
No.	Title	Length
6.	"Black Tiger"	4:18
7.	"Barroom Boogie"	4:20
8.	"My Way or the Highway"	4:43
9.	"Winds of Change"	6:20

== Personnel ==
- Dave Meniketti – electric lead guitar, lead vocals
- Joey Alves – electric and acoustic rhythm guitars
- Phil Kennemore – bass, backing vocals
- Leonard Haze – drums, percussion

Production

- Max Norman – producer, engineer
- Bill Freesh – mixing at Record Plant Studios, Los Angeles, California, US
- John Taylor Dismukes – illustrations
- Chuck Beeson – art direction

== Charts ==
Chart (1982)	Peak position
UK Albums (OCC)	53
