= Jimmy Robinson (recording engineer) =

American recording engineer (1950–2018)

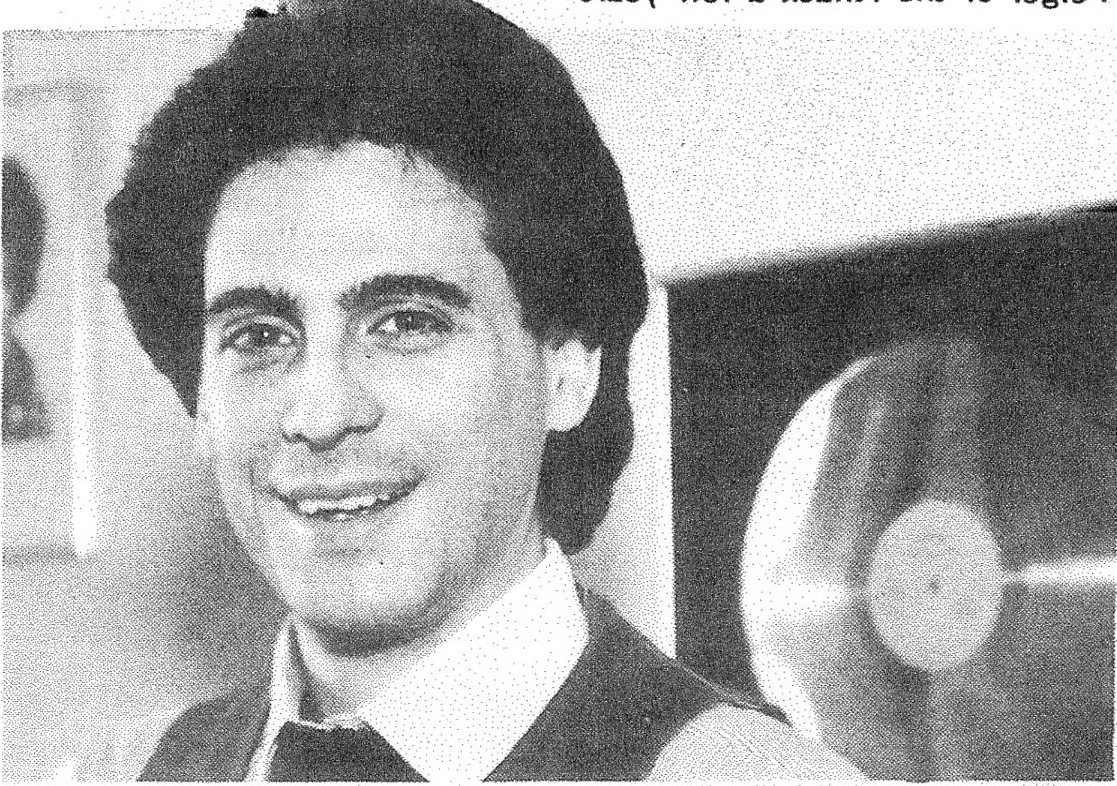
- Robinson at his office at Capitol Records, 1979
- Born: James Kelly Robinson II; July 29, 1950; Washington, D.C., U.S.
- Died: January 6, 2018 (aged 67); New York, New York
- Other names: Jimmy / Jim
- Occupations: Recording engineer; Record producer; Musician

James Kelly Robinson II (July 29, 1950, Washington, D.C. – January 6, 2018, New York) was an American recording engineer, record producer and musician. He was best known for his engineering techniques with both analogue and digital audio recordings with prominent popular pop and rock records in American music from the late 1960s to the present. In addition to his recording expertise, Robinson was also an accomplished musician in his own right and had been awarded gold records as both a saxophonist and bass guitarist.

== Early life ==
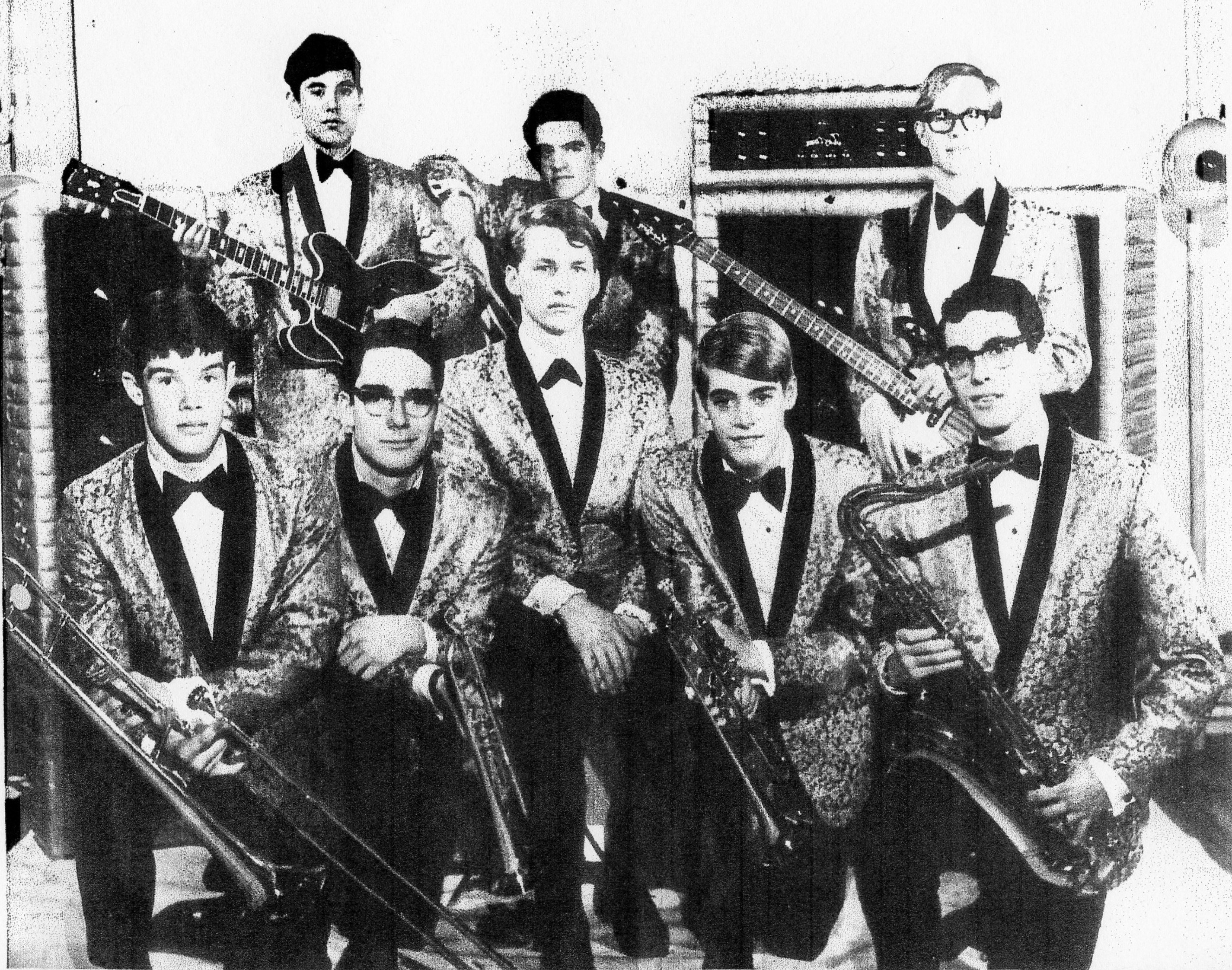
Jimmy Robinson (front, far right) with The Revolution

Jimmy Robinson was born July 29, 1950, in Washington D.C. to James K. Robinson I and Louise H. Robinson and spent his early childhood growing up in College Park, Maryland. At an early age Robinson took a strong interest in music and electronics while attending schools in the Washington metropolitan area and began playing saxophone aged 12 with various bands before joining in the band "The Nowhere Men" at the age of 18 in 1968.

== Engineering and producing ==
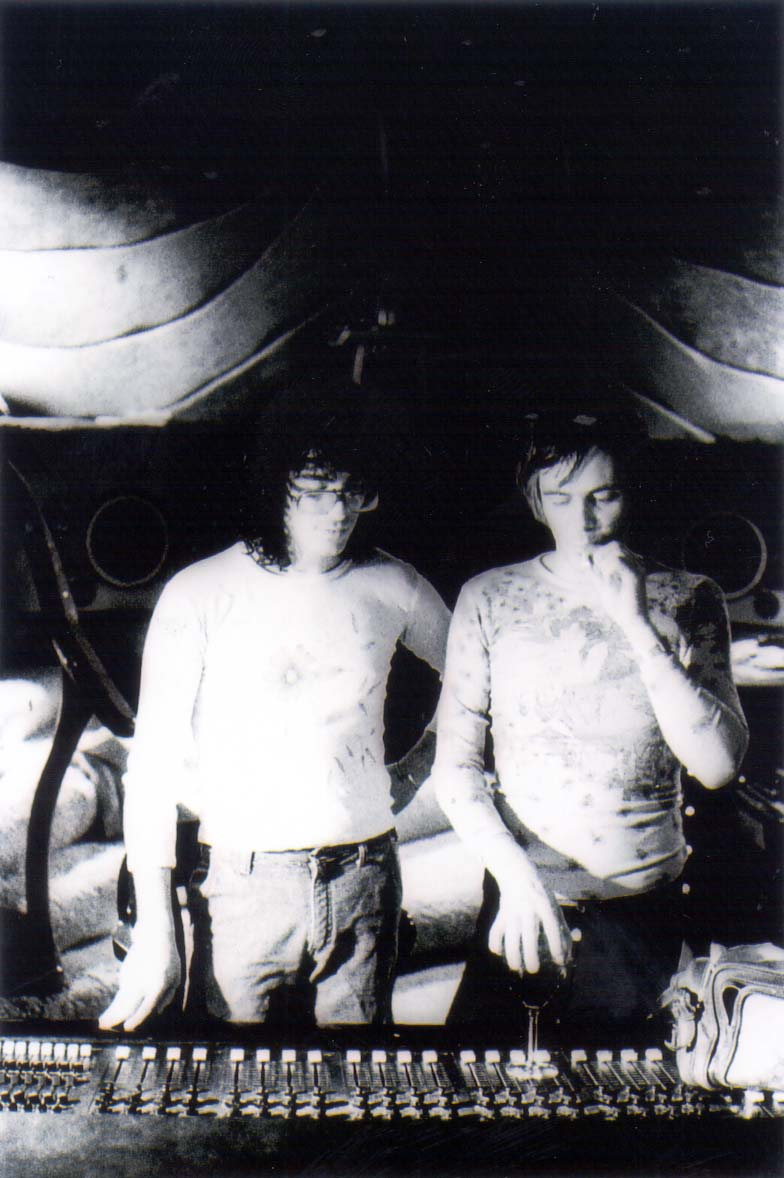
(Left to Right) Jimmy Robinson & Gary Kellgren in the "Pit", Sly Stone's Studio designed by Gary Kellgren in Sausalito, California in 1975. Photo by :Herbie Worthington

=== The Record Plant NYC ===
In 1969, The Nowhere Men were playing a show at The Cellar Door in DC's Georgetown district when Robinson met former Electric Flag drummer Buddy Miles. Buddy took a liking to Robinson's sax playing and invited him up to New York City to work a few gigs and meet Gary Kellgren, and subsequently Jimi Hendrix, at the Record Plant recording studios in New York City.

Gary Kellgren was impressed with Robinson's technical ability and asked him to begin working as an assistant engineer at the Record Plant NYC. At his first session there in 1969, he worked with engineer Jack Adams and R&B singer Patti LaBelle.

During his tenure working at the Record Plant, Robinson developed a close working relationship with Hendrix whom he would drive home and hang out with after sessions. Hendrix preferred to work at night and since Gary Kellgren and fellow engineer Eddie Kramer preferred to record during the day, Robinson soon became one of Hendrix's regular recording engineers for late night sessions.

=== Band of Gypsys ===
Upon hearing that Capitol Records was looking for Hendrix to fulfill a contract he had signed with Ed Chaplin of PPX Enterprises before he had put together the Jimi Hendrix Experience, Hendrix decided to form a band with Buddy Miles and long-time friend and bass player Billy Cox. The name "Band of Gypsys" was already mentioned as an alternative name for his band by Hendrix in his speeches during the Woodstock concert.

Capitol Records sent out Wally Heider to record the live debut of the Band of Gypsys and Gary Kellgren sent Robinson as the Record Plant's preferred engineer. The first live show was to be performed at the Fillmore East on New Year's Eve 1969 with the Voices of East Harlem as the opening act.

The Band of Gypsys' performances were recorded two nights in a row with two shows each night. After the shows, the recordings were sent over to Juggy Sound Studios (owned by producer Juggy Murray) where the album was to be mixed by Eddie Kramer. For a few days the tapes went missing, but were soon found, mixed by Kramer, and then delivered to Capitol Records.

The Band of Gypsys Live at the Fillmore East went up the charts quickly to No. 4 in the US and No. 5 in the U.K. and was RIAA certified gold that same year. This was a first for a live recording. Initially, it was unclear if it was going to be a commercial success. However, shortly after its release it was hailed by critics as the standard for which all artists should strive in live recordings. The recording was Jimmy Robinson's first gold record for recording. Robinson's recording of "Machine Gun" (Capitol Records STAO-472 -US) on Band of Gypsys is considered by most Hendrix aficionados to be the best live solo recording of Hendrix.

Loose Ends, the fourth and last studio album released by Hendrix which Robinson engineered and overdubbed, was released by manager Michael Jeffery. Unfortunately, Warner Bros. Records decided not to release the album in the US & Canada because of content. It was released in the UK, France and Japan.

=== Electric Lady Studios ===
Under the advice of Eddie Kramer and manager Michael Jefferies, Hendrix decided to construct his own recording studio, Electric Lady. After construction was completed, Kramer and Andy Edlen invited Robinson to work there in the summer of 1970. During his tenure working at Electric Lady, Robinson began working on a few tracks for Stevie Wonder's Talking Book and Innervisions. Robinson also worked with several prominent artists of the time including Roberta Flack, Led Zeppelin (on Houses of the Holy), Blood Sweat and Tears, and Miles Davis' Live Evil. In August 1972, jazz vibraphonist Michael Manieri asked Robinson to be his assistant and join GNU Music. Robinson worked for Manieri until the end of the year.

=== Larabee Sound Los Angeles ===
In January 1973 Bob Margoulieff and Malcolm Cecil invited Robinson to Los Angeles to work on a few projects, and he decided it was time to leave NYC.

Upon arriving in Los Angeles, Robinson found himself as the lead candidate to be Chief Engineer of Larrabee Sound on Bob Margoulieff and Malcolm Cecil's recommendation. In February 1973 Robinson was invited to join Larabee Sound as Chief Engineer under the supervision of Jackie Mills. The first slate of recording projects included Cher, Al Wilson, Robbie Krieger, John Densmore from The Doors, Chris DeMarco, and Rachel Perry.

As Robinson was working at Larabee his fondness for technology and instrument construction led him to begin working with Paul Beaver as part of the synthesizer team Beaver and Krouse on a suggestion from Walter Sear; he began developing a polyphonic synthesizer with Paul Beaver that never came to fruition due to Beaver's untimely death in 1974.

Robinson married Maggie Welch, sister of Bob Welch, the guitarist and vocalist for Fleetwood Mac; the couple invited Bob to move into their home in Laurel Canyon. Bob and Robinsom became good friends, and shortly after Bob moved in they had a discussion about Welch's desire to leave Fleetwood Mac.

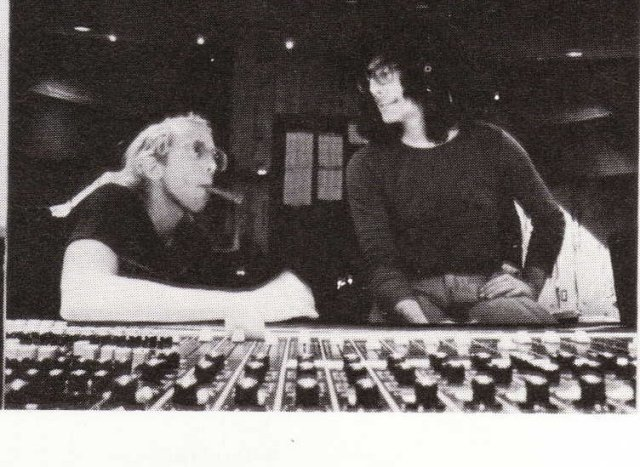
(Left to Right) Bob Welch and Jimmy Robinson at the Record Plant LA – Studio C

Robinson suggested bringing in former Jethro Tull bassist Glen Cornick and ex Nazz drummer Thom Mooney for a new project and brought the band to John Carter at Capitol Records. The new group was to be called Paris, and the idea was embraced by Al Courey, then head of Capitol's A&R department.

=== The Record Plant, L.A. ===
Every Sunday night at 6 pm, Gary Kellgren would throw an A-List only party bearing the name "The Jim Keltner Fan Club Hour" after drummer Jim Keltner, who was well known in musician circles at the time. Austin Godsey, who lived with Jack Adams across from Frank Zappa's house in Laurel Canyon, invited Robinson to the latest "The Jim Keltner Fan Club Hour" party at The Record Plant in Los Angeles.

Upon arrival at the Record Plant, Robinson was asked by Kellgren to help out with recording the artists during the jam session. The artists at the studios that evening were John Lennon, Mick Jagger, Jessie Ed Davis, Danny Kortchmar, Trever Lawrence, Bobby Keys, Jim Price, Jim Keltner, Ringo Starr, Bruce Gary, Wolfgang Metz, Rocky Djubano, Mike Finnigan, Al Kooper, Harry Nilsson, Vennetta Fields, Clydie King, and Claudia Lennear, all appearing on a track to be entitled "Too Many Cooks are Bound to Spoil the Soup". The engineers for the session were Gary Kellgren, Lee Kiefer, Austin Godsy, and Robinson. The current location of the original 16 track master is unknown; however, bootleg 2 tracks have surfaced from time to time on the internet.

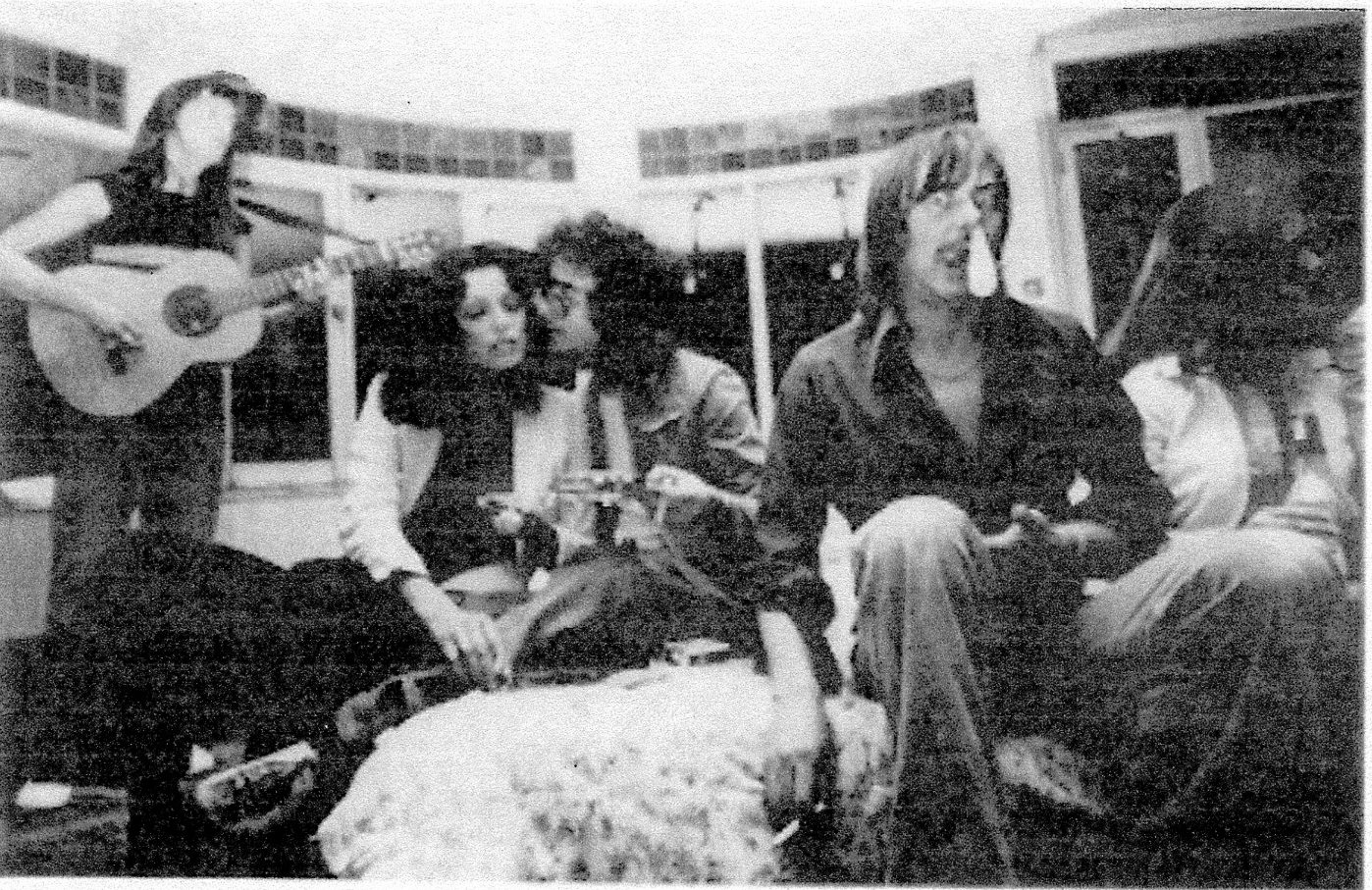
From left to right: (Playing Guitar) Jessie Scotland, (Vogue Model) Angeleen Gagliano and (Producer) Jimmy Robinson, (Record Plant Owner) Gary Kellgren and Kristin Gaines

While working on Paris, Robinson received a phone call from Ben Edmonds from Capitol Records A&R department and asked him to work with Jimmy Page on a new group signed to Swan Song Records. The group was to be called "Detective" and Robinson was to serve as producer and engineer for the first album. This album turned out so well that many Led Zeppelin fans thought that Jimmy Page had produced it under the pseudonym "Jimmy Robinson".

After Detective, Robinson began two albums with Sammy Hagar. The first project with Hagar was 9 on a Ten Scale and then subsequently Red. Shortly after working with Hagar, Lou Bramey of Spread Eagle Productions asked Jimmy Robinson to record and produce Y&T's Struck Down album for London Records. The album Struck Down is best remembered for Dave Meniketti's heavy guitar leads that was preceded the metal scene by a decade.

During his tenure with the Record Plant in Los Angeles, Robinson developed a closer friendship with Gary Kellgren and the two of them took over Sly Stone's custom project studio in Sausalito, CA called "The Pit" that featured eccentric amenities such as a recessed recording area with shag carpeting and secret passages; there, they worked closely with Sly Stone, Paris, Sammy Hagar, Bill Wyman of the Rolling Stones, Van Morrison, and Tower of Power.

=== Gary Kellgren ===
The sudden death of his friend Gary Kellgren in 1977 devastated Robinson. Although he continued to work at The Record Plant Los Angeles, the infamous studio didn't feel the same and so with great sadness Robinson left to pursue other endeavors.

After completing that project, Robinson took a job working A&R for Capitol Records where he helped with the development of several punk rock bands, most notably "The Dogs". After getting word that his mother's health was not good, Robinson moved back to NYC to be close to her and work as a freelance engineer.

=== Chun King, Sony Music, MTV, NYC ===
As an independent engineer Robinson was sought after as a consultant and began working for companies including MTV headquarters in NYC, Chun King Studios, and Sony Music for Tommy Mattola and Dave Smith.

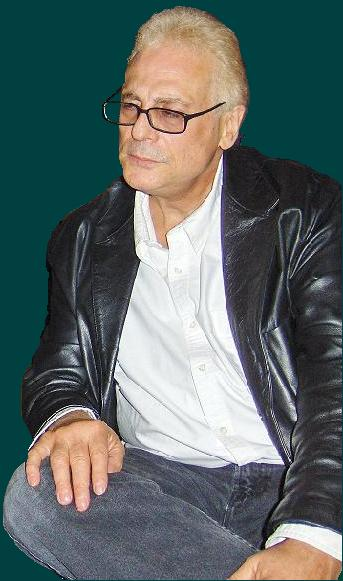
Jimmy Robinson 2009

=== 2003 to present ===
Robinson worked as a freelance engineer right up until his death and produced records with his own small company Ear Candy Audio Productions based in NYC. In addition to his production work he was also an active member of The International Communications Industries Association, A.R.R.L. (Ham Radio), a voting member of National Academy of Recording Arts and Sciences (N.A.R.A.S./Grammys), and voting member of the Audio Engineering Society (A.E.S.).

Robinson died in New York on January 6, 2018, at the age of 67.

== Artists and associated acts and credits ==
- Carmine Appice
- Al Kooper
- Alice in Chains
- Jimmy Bain
- David Bowie
- Jason Becker
- Pat Benatar
- Tim Bogart
- Band of Gypsys
- Led Zeppelin
- Cher
- Miles Davis
- Vic Damone
- Chris DeMarco
- The Dogs
- Even Steven Levee
- Marty Friedman
- Tom Petty & The Heartbreakers
- Sly & The Family Stone
- Jinx Dawson (Coven)
- Martha Davis (The Motels)
- Rick Derringer
- Detective
- Ainsley Dunbar (Journey & The Starship)
- John Entwistle (The Who)
- Buzzy Feiten
- Fleetwood Mac
- Paris
- Sammy Hagar
- Ebn-Ozn
- Jack Killed Jill
- Jimi Hendrix
- Billy Joel
- Mick Jagger
- James Earl Jones
- B. B. King
- Robbie Krieger
- Carole King
- Moogy Klingman
- John Lennon
- Claudine Longet
- Love
- Loudness
- Lynyrd Skynyrd
- Tony MacAlpine
- Harvey Mandel
- Dave Mason
- Mahavishnu Orchestra
- Paul McCartney
- Buddy Miles
- Keith Moon
- Kiss
- Mandrill
- Michael Monarch
- The Mothers of Invention
- Harry Nilsson
- Billy Preston
- Gordon Raphael
- Todd Rungren
- Saxon
- Brian Setzer (Stray Cats)
- Ben Schultz
- Ravi Shankar
- Patty Smyth & Scandal
- Paul Shaffer
- Ringo Starr
- Rod Stewart
- Steven Stills
- Barbra Streisand
- Tommy Tedesco
- Tim Davis
- Klaus Voormann
- Jimmy Webb
- Al Wilson
- Stevie Wonder
- Ron Wood
- Bill Wyman
- The Velvet Underground
- Y&T
- Frank Zappa
