= Facemelter =

Studio album by Y&T
- Released: May 21, 2010
- Recorded: 2009–2010
- Genre: Hard rock, heavy metal
- Length: 1:02:56
- Label: Frontiers Records
- Producer: Y&T

Y&T chronology
Endangered Species (1997)	Facemelter (2010)

Facemelter is the twelfth studio album by American hard rock/heavy metal band Y&T. It was released on May 21, 2010 through the Frontiers Records label. It is their first album since the release of Endangered Species in 1997, the longest gap to date between two Y&T studio albums. This is the final Y&T album to feature bassist Phil Kennemore, who died of cancer the following year. Seventeen songs were written for the album, of which 15 were placed on the album.

Professional ratings
Review scores
Source	Rating
Metalholic	(8.4/10)

== Track listing ==
All tracks are written by Y&T.

No.	Title	Length
1.	"Prelude, On with the Show"	1:40
2.	"On with the Show"	4:10
3.	"How Long"	4:26
4.	"Shine On"	5:01
5.	"I Want Your Money"	4:42
6.	"Wild Child"	4:09
7.	"I'm Coming Home"	5:14
8.	"If You Want Me"	4:33
9.	"Hot Shot"	5:04
10.	"Blind Patriot"	4:10
11.	"Gonna Go Blind"	4:27
12.	"Don't Bring Me Down"	4:22
13.	"One Life"	4:22
14.	"Losing My Mind" (European Bonus track)	4:56
15.	"Deadly Deceiver" (Japanese Bonus track)	3:38

== Personnel ==
- Dave Meniketti – lead vocals, lead guitar
- John Nymann – guitar, backing vocals, solo on "I Want Your Money" and 2nd solo on "Blind Patriot"
- Phil Kennemore – bass guitar, backing vocals
- Mike Vanderhule – drums and percussion, backing vocals

== Charts ==
Chart (2010)	Peak position
Swedish Albums (Sverigetopplistan)	21
