= Ten (Y&T album) =

Studio album by Y&T
- Released: June 1990
- Recorded: 1989
- Studio: Fantasy Studios, (Berkeley); Sound City Studios (Van Nuys); Preferred Sound (Woodland Hills)
- Genre: Pop metal
- Length: 59:39
- Label: Geffen
- Producer: Mike Stone

Y&T chronology
Contagious (1987)	Ten (1990)	Musically Incorrect (1995)

Professional ratings
Review scores
Source	Rating
AllMusic	2/5 stars

Ten is the ninth studio album by American heavy metal band Y&T, released in 1990 by Geffen Records. It was recorded in 1989 and is the last Y&T album released before the band took an 18-month hiatus in 1991. Joey Alves had left the band in 1989 and was replaced on rhythm guitar by Stef Burns, and many of drummer Jimmy DeGrasso’s original tracks were redone by Steve Smith due to producer Mike Stone insisting on bringing in another drummer .

== Track listing ==
No.	Title	Writer(s)	Length
1.	"Hard Times"	Dave Meniketti, Phil Kennemore	5:14
2.	"Lucy"	Phil Kennemore	4:43
3.	"Don't Be Afraid of the Dark"	Robert White Johnson, Taylor Rhodes	4:51
4.	"Girl Crazy"	Dave Meniketti, Phil Kennemore, Jimmy DeGrasso	4:01
5.	"City"	Dave Meniketti, Phil Kennemore, Jimmy DeGrasso, Al Pitrelli	5:37
6.	"Come in from the Rain"	Dave Meniketti, Stef Burns	6:03
7.	"Red Hot & Ready"	Dave Meniketti, Phil Kennemore	4:18
8.	"She's Gone"	Dave Meniketti, Phil Kennemore, Jimmy DeGrasso	4:17
9.	"Let It Out"	Jeff Paris, Moon Calhoun	4:46
10.	"Ten Lovers"	Phil Kennemore	6:06
11.	"Goin' Off the Deep End"	Dave Meniketti, Phil Kennemore	4:32
12.	"Surrender"	Phil Kennemore, Jimmy DeGrasso	5:22

== Personnel ==
- Dave Meniketti - vocals, guitar
- Stef Burns - guitar, vocals
- Phil Kennemore - bass, vocals
- Jimmy DeGrasso - drums on "City", "She's Gone" & "Goin' Off the Deep End"
- Steve Smith - drums on all other tracks

Additional personal

- Jeff Paris - keyboards, vocals

Production

- Mixed at Record Plant, Los Angeles
- Kav Deluxe - co-producer
- Bill Merryfield - co-producer
- Dave Donnelly - supervision
- John Kalodner - A&R, direction
- Scott Boorey - management
- Kurt DeMunbrun - artwork

== Chart ==
Chart (1990)	Peak position
US Billboard 200	110
