= Musically Incorrect =

Studio album by Y&T
- Released: May 21, 1995
- Recorded: March–April 1995
- Studio: The Space Station, Santa Clara, California
- Genre: Hard rock; heavy metal
- Length: 1:02:54
- Label: Music for Nations (USA & Europe)
- Producer: Dave Meniketti, Phil Kennemore, Scott Boorey

Y&T chronology
| Ten (1990) | Musically Incorrect (1995) | Endangered Species (1997) |

Professional ratings
Review scores
| Source | Rating |
|---|---|
| AllMusic | 3/5 stars |
| Rock Hard | 9.0/10 |

Musically Incorrect is the tenth studio album by the American hard rock/heavy metal band Y&T. It was released in 1995 through the Music for Nations label. It was the first Y&T release since reuniting in 1995, and contains the same line-up as when the band disbanded in 1991.

== Track listing ==
| No. | Title | Length |
|---|---|---|
| 1. | "Long Way Down" | 7:11 |
| 2. | "Fly Away" | 7:03 |
| 3. | "Quicksand" | 5:44 |
| 4. | "Cold Day in Hell" | 5:06 |
| 5. | "I've Got My Own" | 4:29 |
| 6. | "Nowhere Land" | 6:35 |
| 7. | "Pretty Prison" | 6:26 |
| 8. | "Don't Know What to Do" | 4:52 |
| 9. | "21st Century" | 5:30 |
| 10. | "I'm Lost ('95 Version)" | 3:19 |
| 11. | "Confusion" | 3:09 |
| 12. | "No Regrets" | 5:28 |

== Personnel ==
- Dave Meniketti – vocals, guitar, producer, assistant engineer, art direction
- Stef Burns – guitar
- Phil Kennemore – bass, backing vocals (Lead vocals and keyboards on "Nowhere Land"), producer
- Jimmy DeGrasso – drums, percussion, cover concept

Production

- Scott Boorey – producer, engineer, mixing at The Space Station, Santa Clara, California
- Phil De Lancie – mastering at Fantasy Studios, Berkeley, California
