= Earthshaker (album) =

Studio album by Y&T
- Released: June 30, 1981
- Studio: The Automatt, San Francisco (tracking); Mediasound, New York City (mixing)
- Genre: Hard rock, heavy metal
- Length: 41:10
- Label: A&M
- Producer: Bob Shulman, David Sieff

Y&T chronology
Struck Down (1978)	Earthshaker (1981)	Black Tiger (1982)

Professional ratings
Review scores
Source	Rating
Allmusic	4.5/5 stars

Earthshaker is the third studio album by American heavy metal band Y&T, released in 1981. It is their first album under the name Y&T, after shortening it from Yesterday and Today, and their first album with A&M Records. A mix of hard rock and heavy metal songs, AllMusic's Eduardo Rivadavia named this album as the best release in the band's career, the album most faithfully representing "the power and energy" of Y&T's "legendary concerts".

The album was re-released in 2006. Contrary to popular belief, the Japanese heavy metal band Earthshaker did not take their name from this album, rather they took it from the song "Earthshaker" off of Y&T's first album Yesterday and Today. A remastered version was released on CD in July 2018 by Rock Candy Records.

== Track listing ==
Side one
No.	Title	Length
1.	"Hungry for Rock"	3:47
2.	"Dirty Girl"	5:06
3.	"Shake It Loose"	2:55
4.	"Squeeze"	4:04
5.	"Rescue Me"	4:44

Side two
No.	Title	Length
6.	"Young and Tough"	3:47
7.	"Hurricane"	3:23
8.	"Let Me Go"	3:12
9.	"Knock You Out"	2:59
10.	"I Believe in You"	7:13

== Personnel ==
- Dave Meniketti – electric guitar, lead vocals (all except track 4)
- Joey Alves – electric and acoustic guitars, backing vocals
- Phil Kennemore – bass, backing and lead vocals (track 4)
- Leonard Haze – drums, backing vocals

Production

- Bob Shulman, David Sieff, Y&T – producers
- Harvey Goldberg, Greg Mann – mixing at Mediasound Studios, New York City
- Chuck Beeson – art Direction
- Norman Moore – design Concept
