= Hear 'n Aid =

Compilation album by various artists
- Released: January 1, 1986
- Recorded: May 20–21, 1985
- Studios: Sound City (Van Nuys, California); A&M (Hollywood, California)
- Genre: Heavy metal
- Length: 43:14
- Label: PolyGram Records
- Producers: "Stars" – Ronnie James Dio; Other tracks – various

Singles from Hear 'n Aid
- 1. "Stars" Released: April 7, 1986

Hear 'n Aid was a charity record released in 1986. It featured a supergroup of 40 heavy metal musicians on a track called "Stars". A music video was released as well, produced during the recording sessions. Proceeds from the album were used to raise over $3 million for famine relief in Africa.

The project was spearheaded by Ronnie James Dio, Jimmy Bain, and Vivian Campbell of the band Dio, who also contributed a live version of "Hungry for Heaven" to the album. The project also included contributions from Tommy Aldridge, Blue Öyster Cult, Dokken, Giuffria, Judas Priest, Mötley Crüe, Night Ranger, Ted Nugent, Queensrÿche, Quiet Riot, Rough Cutt, Twisted Sister, Vanilla Fudge, W.A.S.P. and Y&T, as well as the parody band Spinal Tap, who performed in character.

== Recording ==
In interview video footage taken during the event, Ronnie Dio said that while attending a 48-hour charity Radiothon for African famine relief at the radio station KLOS in Los Angeles, Bain and Campbell noticed that representation from hard rock and heavy metal stars was low. In light of the success of Band Aid's "Do They Know It's Christmas?" and USA for Africa's "We Are the World", they forwarded the idea of a similar project exclusively built around artists from the hard rock and heavy metal genres to Ronnie Dio, and together the three co-wrote "Stars".

"Stars" was recorded on May 20 and 21, 1985, with the first session at Sound City Studios and the second session moving to A&M Studios Studio A, where "We Are the World" was recorded. It was edited and mixed at Rumbo Recorders and mastered at Artisan Sound.

Lead vocals were shared between Ronnie James Dio, Rob Halford, Kevin DuBrow, Eric Bloom, Geoff Tate, Dave Meniketti, Don Dokken, and Paul Shortino. Vivian Campbell, Carlos Cavazo, Buck Dharma, Brad Gillis, Craig Goldy, George Lynch, Yngwie Malmsteen, Eddie Ojeda, and Neal Schon (whose Journey bandmate, Steve Perry, was part of "We Are the World") all added guitar solos. Ronnie & Wendy Dio received a commitment from Led Zeppelin's Jimmy Page that he would do a guitar solo for "Stars" the day after Live Aid, as Led Zeppelin had reunited for the Philadelphia show. A recording session in Philadelphia was set up for July 14 (the day after Led Zeppelin performed) with staff donating their time for the recording. Without explanation, Page backed out of his original commitment.

Iron Maiden's Dave Murray and Adrian Smith were in the middle of their World Slavery Tour at the time, and flew in to provide rhythm guitar lines for the main session, along with Campbell.

== Release and reception ==
The single and album were originally intended to be released shortly after its recording, but contractual issues with the different artists' record labels delayed the release until New Year's Day 1986, somewhat diminishing the impact of its release.

Along with "Stars", the compilation album, titled Hear 'n Aid (or alternatively appearing as Hear 'n Aid (An All-Star Album for Famine Relief))", included "Go for the Throat", the B-side to Y&T's "All American Boy" single, and "Can You See Me" by The Jimi Hendrix Experience, as well as live tracks by Accept, Motörhead, Rush, Kiss, Dio and Scorpions.

The "Stars" single was released on vinyl in both 7" and 12" versions. Both included a 4:43 edit of the track, and a "4 1/2 Minutes News" interviews with musicians who participated in the project. The 12" featured the original 7:04 version as well. The back of the record sleeve for the single had the following description:

"On May 20 and 21, 1985, 40 artists from the hard rock music community gathered at A&M Records Studios to participate in the making of a record called "Stars", as part of a very special project known as Hear 'N Aid. The "Stars" single, coupled with the album, a video documentary on the making of the record, and other ancillary products will raise money for famine relief efforts in Africa and around the world. 40 artists and hundreds of volunteers donated their time and talent over four months to make Hear 'N Aid a reality. "Stars" is a plea for unity in the fight against world hunger."

The single "Stars" peaked at No. 26 in the UK Singles Chart in April 1986. The music video for "Stars" received moderate airplay on MTV's Heavy Metal Mania and afterward on MTV's replacement program Headbangers Ball.

The project also released a 30 minute Sony home video documentary, Hear 'n Aid: The Sessions, which was shot during the recording process and released on VHS and Video8 formats. The back cover for the documentary has the following description:

"'Hear 'N Aid: The Sessions' documents the making of a record, a very special record called 'Stars', that will raise money for famine relief. It is a behind-the-scenes journey through the process of rock 'n roll record-making, from the basic tracks through vocal solos an chorus to performances by 11 stellar guitarists that form a single guitar solo. 40 artists from the hard rock music community and hundreds of volunteers donated their time and talent over four months to make Hear 'N Aid a reality. 'Stars' is a plea for unity in the fight against world hunger."

On May 31, 2004, VH1 premiered a five-night documentary special titled "100 Most Metal Moments", narrated by Dee Snider. At the conclusion, Hear 'n Aid was ranked as the "No. 1 Most Metal Moment".

The following CD release info needs verification as Wendy Dio indicated as late as 2011 that it was only ever released on vinyl and cassette.

"The Hear 'n Aid album was released in CD format in the U.S. in May of 1994. (Mercury/Phonogram 826-044-2 (US, CD Reissue, 5/94). Allmusic references a CD re-release on 13 June 2000 with catalog of PolyGram 4218. Kissmonster references a CD re-release: Japanese import Vertigo PHCR-4218 (Japan, CD Reissue, 11/94)"

== Track listing ==
Side one
No.	Title	Writer(s)	Artist	Length
1.	"Stars"	Ronnie James Dio, Vivian Campbell, Jimmy Bain	Hear 'n Aid	7:15
2.	"Up to the Limit" (Live in Nagoya, Japan; 1985. From the Kaizoku-Ban EP)	Wolf Hoffmann, Stefan Kaufmann, Peter Baltes, Jörg Fischer, Udo Dirkschneider, Deaffy	Accept	5:01
3.	"On the Road" (Live at The Hammersmith Odeon, 1985. From The Birthday Party '85 video)	Burston, Lemmy Kilmister, Phil Campbell, Pete Gill	Motörhead	4:55
4.	"Distant Early Warning" (Live in Toronto, 1984. From the Grace Under Pressure Tour video)	Alex Lifeson, Geddy Lee, Neil Peart	Rush	5:06

Side two
No.	Title	Writer(s)	Artist	Length
5.	"Heaven's on Fire" (Live in Detroit, 1984. From the Animalize Live Uncensored video)	Paul Stanley, Desmond Child	Kiss	4:21
6.	"Can You See Me" (from Are You Experienced)		The Jimi Hendrix Experience	2:27
7.	"Hungry for Heaven" (Live in Philadelphia 1985. Previously unreleased)	Ronnie James Dio, Jimmy Bain	Dio	4:43
8.	"Go for the Throat (In Rock We Trust)" (bonus track)	Dave Meniketti, Joey Alves, Phil Kennemore, Leonard Haze	Y&T	4:32
9.	"The Zoo" (From World Wide Live)	Rudolf Schenker, Klaus Meine	Scorpions	6:14
Total length:				38:09

== Personnel ==
=== Track 1: "Stars" ===
Hear 'n Aid

Lead vocals

- Ronnie James Dio (Dio)
- Dave Meniketti (Y&T)
- Rob Halford (Judas Priest)
- Kevin DuBrow (Quiet Riot)
- Eric Bloom (Blue Öyster Cult)
- Paul Shortino (Rough Cutt)
- Geoff Tate (Queensrÿche)
- Don Dokken (Dokken)

Backing vocals

- Tommy Aldridge
- Dave Alford (Rough Cutt)
- Carmine Appice (Vanilla Fudge/King Kobra)
- Vinny Appice (Dio)
- Jimmy Bain (Dio)
- Frankie Banali (Quiet Riot)
- Mick Brown (Dokken)
- Vivian Campbell (Dio)
- Carlos Cavazo (Quiet Riot)
- Amir Derakh (Rough Cutt)
- Buck Dharma (Blue Öyster Cult)
- Brad Gillis (Night Ranger)
- Craig Goldy (Giuffria)
- Chris Hager (Rough Cutt)
- Chris Holmes (W.A.S.P.)
- Blackie Lawless (W.A.S.P.)
- George Lynch (Dokken)
- Yngwie Malmsteen
- Mick Mars (Mötley Crüe)
- Michael McKean (in character, and credited as David St. Hubbins of Spinal Tap)
- Vince Neil (Mötley Crüe)
- Ted Nugent
- Eddie Ojeda (Twisted Sister)
- Jeff Pilson (Dokken)
- Rudy Sarzo (Quiet Riot)
- Claude Schnell (Dio)
- Neal Schon (Journey)
- Harry Shearer (in character, and credited as Derek Smalls of Spinal Tap)
- Mark Stein (Vanilla Fudge)
- Matt Thorr (Rough Cutt)

Lead guitar solos
1st solo:

- Craig Goldy (Giuffria)
- Eddie Ojeda (Twisted Sister)

2nd solo:

- Vivian Campbell (Dio)
- Brad Gillis (Night Ranger)

3rd solo:

- Neal Schon (Journey)
- George Lynch (Dokken)

4th solo:

- Yngwie Malmsteen
- Vivian Campbell (Dio)

5th solo:

- George Lynch (Dokken)
- Carlos Cavazo (Quiet Riot)

6th solo:

- Brad Gillis (Night Ranger)
- Buck Dharma (Blue Öyster Cult)

Rhythm guitar melody lines

- Dave Murray (Iron Maiden)
- Adrian Smith (Iron Maiden)

Bass

- Jimmy Bain (Dio)

Drums

- Vinny Appice (Dio)
- Frankie Banali (Quiet Riot)

Keyboards

- Claude Schnell (Dio)

=== Track 2: "Up to the Limit" ===
Accept

- Vocals - Udo Dirkschneider
- Guitars - Wolf Hoffmann
- Guitars - Jörg Fischer
- Bass guitar - Peter Baltes
- Drums - Stefan Kaufmann

=== Track 3: "On the Road" ===
Mötorhead

- Vocals, bass guitar - Lemmy Kilmister
- Rhythm guitar - Phil "Wizzö" Campbell
- Lead guitar - Michael "Würzel" Burston
- Drums - Pete Gill

=== Track 4: "Distant Early Warning" Live ===
Rush

- Bass and rhythm guitar, vocals, synthesizers, and bass pedal synthesizer - Geddy Lee
- Electric and acoustic guitars, and bass pedal synthesizer - Alex Lifeson
- Drums and percussion - Neil Peart

=== Track 5: "Heaven's on Fire" Live ===
Kiss

- Rhythm guitar, lead vocals - Paul Stanley
- Bass guitar, lead vocals - Gene Simmons
- Drums, backing vocals - Eric Carr
- Lead guitar - Bruce Kulick

=== Track 6: "Can You See Me" ===
The Jimi Hendrix Experience

- Guitar, lead vocals - Jimi Hendrix
- Bass guitar - Noel Redding
- Drums - Mitch Mitchell

=== Track 7: "Hungry for Heaven" Live ===
Dio

- Vocals - Ronnie James Dio
- Guitar - Vivian Campbell
- Bass guitar - Jimmy Bain
- Drums - Vinny Appice
- Keyboards - Claude Schnell

=== Track 8: "Go for the Throat" ===
Y&T

- Lead vocals, lead guitar - Dave Meniketti
- Rhythm guitar, backing vocals - Joey Alves
- Bass guitar, backing vocals - Phil Kennemore
- Drums, backing vocals - Leonard Haze

=== Track 9: "The Zoo" Live ===
Scorpions

- Lead vocals - Klaus Meine
- Lead guitar, voice-box, backing vocals - Matthias Jabs
- Rhythm guitar, backing vocals - Rudolf Schenker
- Bass guitar, backing vocals - Francis Buchholz
- Drums, percussion, backing vocals - Herman Rarebell

== Charts ==
Chart (1986)	Peak position
Australia (Kent Music Report)	76

== The non-profit ==
Prior to the album release, and indicative of their business acumen and commitment to the project's success, Ronnie Dio, Bain and Campbell established Hear 'n Aid as a full fledged non-profit, presumably to avoid experiencing similar missteps and pitfalls encountered with previous African aid efforts. "Hear ’n Aid had to be a non-profit organisation… We had to set up a board of directors, fourteen people, and all decisions had to be made by the board. My role was getting the licensing." - Wendy Dio

The Classic Rock article also indicates the project leadership and participants were well aware that the funds raised from similar events such as Band Aid were squandered due to governmental corruption as well as suffering from general disorganization which led to things such as "food rotting on docks" - Paul Shortino (vocalist for Rough Cutt). The funds raised through the Hear 'n Aid project were instead used to purchase and ship agricultural machinery.

During the period of high popularity of MySpace, Ronnie James Dio's profile contained an entry crediting the project with having raised $1 million within a year. In a 2017 article written for Classic Rock, Ronnie's wife and manager, Wendy Dio, estimated the project's total amount raised to be over $3 million.

== Re-issue and potential sequel ==
Ronnie Dio planned on recording a second benefit single called "Throw Away Children" for "Children of the Night", a charity that he was involved with that benefited runaway children. For various reasons, the project never materialized, and the song ended up appearing on the 2002 Dio album, Killing the Dragon. On 26 July 1986 some of the members of Hear 'n Aid reunited to perform “Stars” as the encore for Dio’s concert at Southern California’s Irvine Meadows Amphitheatre.

On 2 November 2011, Dio's widow Wendy announced that the song "Stars" would be re-released. She told Rolling Stone: “I’m going to re-release [Stars] because it only ever came out on vinyl and cassette. So it’ll come out on DVD and CD, I have loads of outtakes for the video”.

On 30 March 2015, Wendy Dio spoke with Eddie Trunk on his SiriusXM satellite radio show Eddie Trunk Live. "We are in talks right now with a couple of record labels to reissue HEAR 'N AID, with the funds going to [the Ronnie James Dio] Stand Up And Shout [Cancer Fund, the charity founded in memory of the late singer]". "We have so much stuff that was never released before — behind-the-scenes stuff that was shot during the whole time. We have photos galore of everybody that was involved in it, and I think it'll be fantastic. We just have to work on it. It may not come out this year, because I want everything to be perfect, as Ronnie would want it to be, but I am in talks about it, and that will be coming out, definitely."

In April 2015, Wendy Dio confirmed that a modern-day version of Hear 'n Aid was in the works to record a "new song" and released alongside the upcoming reissue of "Stars". She had stated that "legal stuff" was the cause of the reissue delay.
