= Struck Down =

Studio album by Yesterday and Today
- Released: June 1978
- Recorded: The Record Plant, Sausalito and Los Angeles
- Genre: Hard rock; heavy metal
- Length: 29:35
- Label: London
- Producer: Jimmy Robinson

Yesterday and Today chronology
Yesterday and Today (1976)	Struck Down (1978)	Earthshaker (1981)

Struck Down is the second studio album by American hard rock/heavy metal band Yesterday and Today, released in 1978. It was one of the last rock albums to be released by London Records. A remastered version was released on CD by Rock Candy Records in June 2025.

The band would change their name to Y&T for their next studio album, Earthshaker.

== Critical reception ==
Professional ratings
Review scores
Source	Rating
AllMusic	2.5/5 stars
Collector's Guide to Heavy Metal	10/10

On its release, reviewers of Record World considered group "completely self-contained" and expressed an opinion that "hard rockers and heavy metal enthusiasts should delight to "I'm Lost" and "Struck Down". Billboard in its review of 15 July 1978 found the band on this album "continues its emphasis on high energy rock'n'roll in the Van Halen tradition". In comparison with debut LP this one has more polished sound due to Robinson's production. Reviewer concluded that "the writing is also sharper and more on the lyrical side, delivered convincingly and instrumentally supported by pulsating guitar riffs" and named among the best tracks the following: "Struck Down", "Tried to Show You", "Pleasure in My Heart" and "Dreams of Egypt".

== Track listing ==
Side one
No.	Title	Writer(s)	Length
1.	"Struck Down"	Dave Meniketti, Leonard Haze	4:33
2.	"Pleasure in My Heart"	Meniketti, Haze	4:44
3.	"Road"	Meniketti, Haze	2:58
4.	"Nasty Sadie"	Haze, Joey Alves, Meniketti	3:48

Side two
No.	Title	Writer(s)	Length
5.	"Dreams of Egypt"	Haze, Meniketti	4:14
6.	"Tried to Show You"	Meniketti	3:43
7.	"I'm Lost"	Meniketti, Phil Kennemore, Haze	2:59
8.	"Stargazer (Round & Round)"	Kennemore	4:36

== Personnel ==
- Dave Meniketti – vocals, guitar
- Joey Alves – guitar, vocals
- Phil Kennemore – bass, vocals
- Leonard Haze – percussion, drums, vocals
- Robert Russ – piano
- Cherie Currie – backing vocals
- Galen Cook – organ
