= Yesterday and Today (Yesterday and Today album) =

Studio album by Yesterday and Today
- Released: 1976
- Recorded: His Master's Wheels, San Francisco
- Genre: Hard rock; heavy metal
- Length: 41:16
- Label: London
- Producer: Louis Bramy

Yesterday and Today chronology
Yesterday and Today (1976)	Struck Down (1978)

Professional ratings
Review scores
Source	Rating
Collector's Guide to Heavy Metal	7/10

Yesterday and Today is the debut studio album by American hard rock/heavy metal band Yesterday and Today, released in 1976 through London Records. A remastered version was rereleased on CD in June 2025 by Rock Candy Records.

== Track listing ==
Side one
No.	Title	Writer(s)	Length
1.	"Animal Woman"	Joey Alves, Phil Kennemore, Dave Meniketti	3:40
2.	"25 Hours a Day"	Alves, Meniketti, Leonard Haze	3:39
3.	"Game Playing Woman"	Meniketti, Kennemore, Haze	5:23
4.	"Come on Over"	Meniketti, Alves, Haze	3:08
5.	"My Heart Plays Too"	Meniketti	6:37

Side two
No.	Title	Writer(s)	Length
6.	"Earthshaker"	Meniketti, Haze	3:19
7.	"Fast Ladies (Very Slow Gin)"	Meniketti, Haze	4:29
8.	"Alcohol"	Meniketti, Alves, Haze	4:30
9.	"Beautiful Dreamer"	Meniketti, Haze	5:31

== Personnel ==
- Dave Meniketti – lead guitar, lead (1–7, 9) and backing vocals
- Joey Alves – rhythm guitar, backing vocals
- Phil Kennemore – bass, backing and co-lead (1) vocals
- Leonard Haze – drums, backing and lead (8) vocals
