= Tadeshi =

Tadeshi is an alternate spelling of the Japanese name Tadashi

Spelt as Tadeshi people:

- Tadeshi Umezawa
- Tadeshi, the main character in the movie The Great Yokai War
