= Endangered Species (Y&T album) =

Studio album by Y&T
- Released: October 8, 1997
- Recorded: May 1996–January 1997
- Studio: The Space Station Santa Clara, California
- Genre: Hard rock; heavy metal
- Length: 54:49
- Label: Music for Nations (United Kingdom and Europe) Bareknuckle Records (Japan)
- Producer: Dave Meniketti, Phil Kennemore, Scott Boorey

Y&T chronology
Musically Incorrect (1995)	Endangered Species (1997)	Facemelter (2010)

Professional ratings
Review scores
Source	Rating
Allmusic	3.5/5 stars

Endangered Species is the eleventh studio album by American hard rock/heavy metal band Y&T, released in 1997 through the Music for Nations label.

== Track listing ==
No.	Title	Length
1.	"Hello, Hello (I'm Back Again)"	5:00
2.	"Black Gold"	4:46
3.	"Gimmie the Beat"	4:42
4.	"God Only Knows"	5:12
5.	"Sumthin' 4 Nuth'n"	4:11
6.	"Still Falling"	5:37
7.	"Voices"	4:21
8.	"I Wanna Cry"	4:24
9.	"Sail On By"	5:20
10.	"Can't Stop the Rain"	3:39
11.	"Try to Believe"	4:58

Bonus track
No.	Title	Length
12.	"Rocco (Instrumental)"	4:39

Original 1997 Japanese Release Bonus Track
No.	Title	Length
13.	"Hands Of Time" (Acoustic Version)	5:09

Original 1997 UK Release on Music For Nations
No.	Title	Length
1.	"Hello, Hello (I'm Back Again)"	5:00
2.	"Black Gold"	4:46
3.	"God Only Knows"	5:12
4.	"Sumthin' 4 Nuth'n"	4:11
5.	"Can't Stop the Rain"	3:39
6.	"Sail On By"	5:20
7.	"Still Falling"	5:37
8.	"I Wanna Cry"	4:24
9.	"Gimmie the Beat"	4:42
10.	"Voices"	4:21
11.	"Try to Believe"	4:58
12.	"Rocco" (Instrumental Bonus track)	4:39

== Personnel ==
- Dave Meniketti – vocals, guitar, producer, engineer, artwork, cover concept
- Stef Burns – guitar
- Phil Kennemore – bass, producer
- Jimmy DeGrasso – drums, percussion

Production

- Scott Boorey – producer, engineer, mixing at Rocket Lab, San Francisco, California in February 1997
- Scott Boorey management – management
