= Contagious (Y&T album) =

Studio album by Y&T
- Released: June 1987
- Studios: Sound City Studios, Van Nuys, California
- Genre: Glam metal
- Length: 42:06
- Label: Geffen
- Producers: Kevin Beamish and Scott Boorey

Y&T chronology
Down for the Count (1985)	Contagious (1987)	Ten (1990)

Professional ratings
Review scores
Source	Rating
Allmusic	1.5/5 stars
Crash	4–5/6

Contagious is the eighth studio album by American heavy metal band Y&T, released in 1987 through Geffen Records, which, like their previous label A&M Records, is now a subsidiary of Interscope Records (itself owned by Universal Music Group). It is the first Y&T studio album to feature a different line up since their debut album, with Jimmy DeGrasso replacing Leonard Haze on drums after he left the band in 1986.

The band used outside co-writers on many songs for the album. Taylor Rhodes has written hits for Aerosmith and Celine Dion and produced and wrote on an album by glam metal band Kix, the song "Temptation" is credited to Kennemore along with Megadeth and Savatage guitarist Al Pitrelli and Danger Danger bassplayer Bruno Ravel, while Robert White Johnson who cowrote "Eyes of a Stranger" with Rhodes also wrote songs for Celine Dion and Doro among many others.

30,000 albums were pressed with the title "Boys Night Out" instead of "L.A. Rocks." This was due to the song title chosen for that song that came from Jesse Harms (Sammy Hagar's keyboardist at the time) who was working with Dave Meneketti at the time but when Geffen released a Sammy Hagar album using the actual song written by Harms, "Boys Night Out," Y&T was forced to change the title on the insistence of David Geffen.

The album peaked at #78 on the Billboard 200.

== Track listing ==
Side one
No.	Title	Writer(s)	Length
1.	"Contagious"	Dave Meniketti, Taylor Rhodes	3:21
2.	"L.A. Rocks"	Phil Kennemore, Meniketti	4:41
3.	"Temptation"	Kennemore, Al Pitrelli, Bruno Ravel	4:26
4.	"The Kid Goes Crazy"	Jimmy DeGrasso, Kennemore, Meniketti	4:15
5.	"Fight for Your Life"	Joey Alves, Kennemore, Meniketti	4:49

Side two
No.	Title	Writer(s)	Length
6.	"Armed and Dangerous"	DeGrasso, Kennemore, Meniketti	4:20
7.	"Rhythm or Not"	Alves, Kennemore, Meniketti	5:06
8.	"Bodily Harm"	Robert White Johnson, Rhodes	3:33
9.	"Eyes of a Stranger"	Kennemore, Meniketti, Rhodes	4:40
10.	"I'll Cry for You" (Instrumental)	Alves, Meniketti	2:37

== Personnel ==
=== Band members ===
- Dave Meniketti – vocals, guitar, acoustic guitar
- Joey Alves – guitar, acoustic guitar
- Phil Kennemore – bass, backing vocals
- Jimmy DeGrasso – drums

=== Additional musicians ===
- Steffen Presley – keyboards

Production

- Kevin Beamish – producer, engineer, background vocals
- Scott Boorey – producer, engineer, executive producer, management
- Bruce Barris – engineer
- Wally Buck – assistant engineer, assistant
- Kevin Elson – mixing at Fantasy Studios, background vocals
- Greg Fulginiti – mastering
- Hugh Syme – art direction
- Bill Traut – assistant, management
- Glen Wexler – photography

== Charts ==
Chart (1987)	Peak position
Swedish Albums (Sverigetopplistan)	27
US Billboard 200	78
