= Down for the Count =

Studio album by Y&T
- Released: November 4, 1985
- Recorded: 1985
- Studio: Sound City (Van Nuys, California)
- Genre: Hard rock; heavy metal; glam metal
- Length: 40:49
- Label: A&M
- Producer: Kevin Beamish

Y&T chronology
Open Fire (1985)	Down for the Count (1985)	Contagious (1987)

Singles from Down for the Count
- 1. "Summertime Girls" Released: 1985; 2. "All American Boy" Released: 1985

Professional ratings
Review scores
Source	Rating
AllMusic	2.0/5 stars

Down for the Count is the seventh studio album by American hard rock/heavy metal band Y&T, released on November 4, 1985, by A&M Records. The album marks the band's change to a lighter sound to find success in the hair metal scene. It contains the band's biggest hit "Summertime Girls", which charted at #55 on the Billboard Hot 100. This song had initially appeared as the only studio track on the band's live album, Open Fire, released earlier in the year. The album itself peaked at #91 on the Billboard 200 on December 14, 1985. It was the last album with the original line-up of Meniketti, Alves, Kennemore and Haze, as Haze left the following year.

== Reception ==
The AllMusic reviewer Eduardo Rivadavia gave the album two stars out of five, and criticized the band for "[joining] the perm-haired masses then issuing like dandruff out of the California dust to redefine the meaning of the word "dumb"".

== Track listing ==
All tracks are written by Y&T except where indicated

Side one
No.	Title	Writer(s)	Length
1.	"In the Name of Rock"		5:32
2.	"All American Boy"	Dave Robbins, Van Stephenson	2:24
3.	"Anytime at All"		4:32
4.	"Anything for Money"		3:22
5.	"Face Like an Angel"		4:36

Side two
No.	Title	Writer(s)	Length
6.	"Summertime Girls"		3:28
7.	"Looks Like Trouble"		4:07
8.	"Your Mama Don't Dance"	Kenny Loggins, Jim Messina	2:50
9.	"Don't Tell Me What to Wear"		4:02
10.	"Hands of Time"		6:11

== Personnel ==
- Dave Meniketti – lead vocals, lead guitar
- Joey Alves – rhythm guitar, backing vocals
- Phil Kennemore – bass, backing vocals
- Leonard Haze – drums, percussion

Additional musicians

- Randy Nichols – keyboards on "Summertime Girls"
- John Nymann – vocals
- Bill Costa – vocals
- Steffen Presley – keyboards on "Hands of Time"
- Claude Schnell – keyboards on "Anytime at All" and "Face Like an Angel"
- Adam Day – guitar

Production

- Remixed at Battery Studios (London)
- Kevin Beamish – producer, engineer
- Tony Platt – engineer, remixer
- Bruce Barris – engineer
- Donald Krieger – design
- Neon Park – illustration
- Jeff Gold – art direction
- Chuck Beeson – art direction
- Mark Weiss – photography

== Charts ==
Chart (1985)	Peak position
US Billboard 200	91
