= Fukami =

Fukami is a Japanese surname. Notable people with the surname include:

- Makoto Fukami (深見真, born 1977), Japanese writer
- Rika Fukami (深見 梨加, born 1963), Japanese voice actress
- Sueharu Fukami (深見陶治, born 1947), Japanese sculptor
- Tadashi Fukami, Japanese professor
