= Tadashi =

Tadashi (Kanji: 正, 禎, 忠, 荘, 匡史, 理 Hiragana: ただし) is a masculine Japanese given name which may refer to:

- Tadashi Abe (阿部 正; 1926-1984), the first aikido master to live and teach in the west
- Tadashi Abe (rower) (阿部 肇; born 1963), Japanese rower
- Tadashi Agi (亜樹 直; 1962-), Japanese manga story writer, novelist and screenwriter
- Tadashi Asai (浅井 正; 1935–1990), Japanese wrestler
- Tadashi Ehara, Japanese game designer
- Tadashi Endo (1947–2025), Japanese butoh dancer
- Tadashi Fukami, Japanese-American ecologist
- Tadashi Fukushima (equestrian) (福島 正; born 1944), Japanese equestrian
- Tadashi Fukushima (runner) (福島 正; born 1964), Japanese retired long-distance runner
- Tadashi Funaoka (舟岡 正; born 1932), Japanese sailor
- Tadashi Hanaya (花谷 正; 1894–1957), Japanese general in the Imperial Japanese Army
- Tadashi Hattori (服部 匡志; born 1964), Japanese ophthalmologist
- Tadashi Hayashi (林 正; born 1962), Japanese basketball coach
- Tadashi Honda (本多 忠; born 1951), Japanese former backstroke swimmer
- Tadashi Horikoshi (堀越 信司; born 1988), Japanese Paralympic athlete
- Tadashi Hoshino (星野 直志), Japanese paralympic athlete
- Tadashi Hyōdō (兵頭 精; 1899–1980), first Japanese woman to gain a pilot's licence
- Tadashi Iijima (飯島 正; 1902–1996), Japanese film critic
- Tadashi Ikeda (池田 正; born 1949), Japanese sailor
- Tadashi Imai (今井 正; 1912–1991), Japanese film director
- Tadashi Inuzuka (犬塚 直史; 1954-), Japanese politician
- Tadashi Irie (入江 禎; born 1944), a Japanese yakuza boss
- Tadashi Ishimine (伊志嶺 忠; 1985-), baseball catcher for the Tohoku Rakuten Golden Eagles
- Tadashi Kaminagai (上永井 正; 1899-1982), Japanese painter, draftsman and mold maker
- Tadashi Kanehisa (金久 正; 1906–1997), Japanese folklorist and linguist
- Tadashi Kaneko (兼子 正; 1912–1942), Japanese officer, ace fighter pilot, and leader in the Imperial Japanese Navy
- Tadashi Katakura (片倉 衷; 1898–1991), Japanese general in the Imperial Japanese Army
- Tadashi Kato (加藤 忠; born 1935), Japanese cyclist
- Tadashi Kawamata (川俣 正; born 1953), a Japanese plasticist
- Tadashi Kawashima (河島 正; 1969–2010), Japanese manga artist
- Tadashi Kitta (橘田 規; 1934–2003), Japanese professional golfer
- Tadashi Kodaira (小平 忠; 1915–2000), Japanese politician
- Tadashi Koya (小屋 禎; born 1970), Japanese former football player
- Tadashi Kume (久米 是志; 1931–2022), Japanese businessman
- Tadashi Kuranari (倉成 正; 1918-1996), Japanese politician
- Tadashi Lometo, Marshallese politician
- Tadashi Maeda (admiral) (前田 精; 1898–1977), Japanese high-ranking Imperial Japanese Navy officer
- Tadashi Maeda (banker) (前田 匡史; born 1957), Japanese governor
- Tadashi Maeda (politician) (前田 正; 1946–2013), Japanese politician
- Tadashi Maeyama (前山 忠; born 1944), Japanese artist
- Tadashi Mamiya (間宮 正; 1911–1984), Japanese painter
- Tadashi Matsuura (松浦 忠史; born 1976), Japanese musician and record producer better known as "Kisaki"
- Tadashi Mihara (三原 正; born 1955), Japanese boxer
- Tadashi Miyazawa (宮澤 正; born 1955), a Japanese voice actor
- Tadashi Mori (森 正; 1921-1987), Japanese conductor and flautist
- Tadashi Munakata (宗像 政; 1854–1918), Japanese politician
- Tadashi Murakami (村上 正), Japanese mixed martial artist
- Tadashi Murakami (athlete) (村上 正; 1912–????), Japanese hurdler
- Tadashi Nagano (長野 正; 1930–2017), Taiwanese-born Japanese mathematician
- Tadashi Nakamura (biathlete) (中村 忠; born 1956), Japanese biathlete
- Tadashi Nakamura (filmmaker) (born 1980), American documentary filmmaker
- Tadashi Nakamura (footballer) (中村 忠; born 1971), Japanese former football player and manager
- Tadashi Nakamura (martial artist) (中村 忠; born 1942), Japanese karateka
- Tadashi Nakamura (voice actor) (中村 正; 1929–2019), Japanese actor, voice actor and narrator
- Tadashi Nakayama (artist) (中山 正; 1927–2014), Japanese woodblock print artist
- Tadashi Nakayama (mathematician) (中山 正; 1912–1964), Japanese mathematician
- Tadashi Negishi (1912–1985), Japanese rower
- Tadashi Nishimatsu, Japanese hairstylist
- Tadashi Obara (小原 唯志; born 1983), Japanese speed skater
- Tadashi Ogasahara (小笠原 唯志; born 1969), Japanese football manager
- Tadashi Ogasawara (小笠原 嘉; born 1955), Japanese former cyclist
- Tadashi Ohtsuka (大束 忠司; 1978-), Japanese badminton player
- Tadashi Ōishi (大石 直嗣; born 1989), Japanese professional shogi player
- Tadashi Okamoto (岡本 正; born 1947), Japanese boxer
- Tadashi Saito (斎藤 直; born 1938), Japanese rower
- Tadashi Sasaki (banker) (佐々木 直; 1907–1988), Japanese central banker
- Tadashi Sasaki (engineer) (佐々木 正; 1915–2018), Japanese engineer
- Tadashi Sasaki (musician) (born 1943), Japanese classical guitarist
- Tadashi Sato (佐藤 正; 1923–2005), American artist
- Tadashi Satō (politician) (佐藤 正; 1849–1920), Japanese Army officer and politician
- Tadashi Sawamura (沢村 忠; 1943–2021), Japanese kickboxer
- Tadashi Sawashima (沢島 忠; 1926–2018), Japanese film director and theatre director
- Tadashi Settsu (攝津 正; born 1982), Japanese baseball player
- Tadashi Shimada (嶋田 忠; born 1949), Japanese photographer
- Tadashi Shimijima (霜島 正; 1912–????), Japanese rower
- Tadashi Shimizu (清水 忠史; born 1968), Japanese communist politician
- Tadashi Shimokawa (下川 禎; born 1962), Japanese fencer
- Tadashi Shoji (タダシ ショージ; born 1948), American-based Japanese fashion designer
- Tadashi Suetsugi (末次 忠司; born 1958), Japanese academic, civil engineer and writer
- Tadashi Sugiura (杉浦 忠; 1935–2001), Japanese Nippon Professional Baseball player
- Tadashi Sugiyama (杉山 直; born 1959), Japanese video game designer and producer
- Tadashi Sumiyoshi (住吉 正; 1893–1976)), Japanese major general in the Imperial Japanese Army
- Tadashi Suzuki (鈴木 忠志; born 1939), Japanese avant-garde theatre director, writer and philosopher
- Tadashi Takamura (高村 規; 1933-2014), Japanese photographer
- Tadashi Takayanagi (高柳 匡; born 1975), Japanese theoretical physicist
- Tadashi Takeda (竹田 忠嗣; born 1986), Japanese former professional football player
- Tadashi Tokieda (時枝 正; born 1968), Japanese mathematician
- Tadashi Tomori (友利 正; born 1959), Japanese retired boxer
- Tadashi Ushijima (牛嶋 正; 1931–2024), Japanese economist and politician
- Tadashi Wakabayashi (若林 忠志; 1908–1965), Japanese/American baseball player
- Tadashi Watanabe (渡辺 貞; born 1944), Japanese computer engineer
- Tadashi Yamamoto (山本 正; 1936–2012), Japanese internationalist
- Tadashi Yamamoto (athlete) (山本 忠司; 1925–1998), Japanese triple jumper
- Tadashi Yamashina (山科 忠; born 1951), Japanese former Team Principal of the Toyota Racing Formula One
- Tadashi Yamashita (山下 忠; born 1941), Japanese American martial artist
- Tadashi Yanada (梁田 貞; 1883–1959), Japanese composer
- Tadashi Yanai (柳井 正; born 1949), Japanese billionaire and richest man in Japan
- Tadashi Yokouchi (横内 正; born 1941), Japanese actor
- Tadashi Yoyogi (代々木 忠; born 1938), Japanese director

== Fictional characters ==
- Tadashi Hamada, a character from Big Hero 6
- Tadashi Karino (狩野 宙), a character from anime series S.A: Special A
- Tadashi Yamaguchi (山口 忠), a character from Haikyuu with the position of middle blocker from Karasuno High
