= Detective (band) =

1970s rock band

- Origin: United States of America
- Genres: Hard rock, funk rock, soul
- Years active: 1975–1979
- Labels: Swan Song, Atlantic, Org Music
- Past members: Tony Kaye; Michael Monarch; Michael Des Barres; Bobby Pickett; Jon Hyde
- Website: detective-theband.com

Detective was an American/English rock band, that toured and recorded in the late 1970s. Detective consisted of vocalist Michael Des Barres, guitarist Michael Monarch, bassist Bobby Pickett (not the 1960s singer of the same name), ex-Yes keyboardist Tony Kaye, and drummer Jon Hyde. The band released two albums, Detective (produced by the band, Andy Johns and Jimmy Robinson) and It Takes One to Know One in 1977, as well as Live From The Atlantic Studios, a promotional album recorded in 1978 for radio broadcast, in 1978.

"They were good," recalled Jimmy Page of Led Zeppelin, on whose Swan Song label Detective debuted. "That first album of theirs, it was really good. It should have been more popular, shouldn't it?"

In support of their second album, It Takes One To Know One, Detective toured as the support act for Kiss. One cover song that ended up on Detective's debut album was previously tried out by Kiss for their 1976 Destroyer album: "Ain't None Of Your Business", with Peter Criss on lead vocals. Demos exist of the Kiss version, and were finally released in 2021 on the Super Deluxe version of Destroyer.

Detective went into the studio in 1978 with producer, Tom Dowd, to record their third album. While their first two albums were on Led Zeppelin's Swan Song label, Atlantic Records took over the band for their third release. Atlantic wanted a hit single from the band. Dowd brought in a song from a then unknown singer-songwriter named John Cougar, "I Need a Lover". According to Monarch, they did not want to record it, but agreed. It remains unreleased to this day, along with a couple of original songs. Monarch later said that the members of Detective were moving in different directions and the group decided to disband.

Michael Des Barres performed songs on the fourth episode of the first season of the sitcom WKRP in Cincinnati, as part of the fictional hoodlum rock group "Scum of the Earth". Des Barres (who played "Sir Charles Weatherbee" aka "Dog") and two other actors (Peter Elbling, as "Blood", and Jim Henderson, as "Nigel") played the part of the band during most of the TV show, and Detective performed their song "Got Enough Love" at the end of the show segment.

Bass player Bobby Pickett died on October 24, 2026.

== Discography ==
=== Detective (Swan Song Records, 1977) ===
U.S. No. 135

Track Listing

1. "Recognition" - (Michael Des Barres, Pamela Des Barres, Michael Monarch) - 4:27
2. "Got Enough Love" - (M. Des Barres, P. Des Barres, Monarch) - 3:59
3. "Grim Reaper" - (M. Des Barres, Monarch, Bobby Pickett, Jon Hyde) - 4:10
4. "Nightingale" - (Monarch, Hyde) - 4:54
5. "Detective Man" - (Monarch, Hyde) - 3:25
6. "Ain't None Of Your Business" - (Lew Anderson, Becky Hobbs) 4:29
7. "Deep Down" - (Monarch, Pickett) - 3:06
8. "Wild Hot Summer Nights" - (Monarch, Hyde) - 4:17
9. "One More Heartache" - (Monarch, Hyde) - 5:22

Personnel

- Michael Des Barres - lead vocals
- Michael Monarch - guitars
- Tony Kaye - keyboards
- Bobby Pickett - bass, backing vocals
- Jon Hyde - drums, backing vocals, percussion

=== It Takes One to Know One (Swan Song Records, 1977) ===
U.S. No. 103

Track Listing

1. "Help Me Up" - (Hyde) - 4:14
2. "Competition" - (Michael Des Barres, Pamela Des Barres, Monarch, Kaye) - 4:34
3. "Are You Talkin' To Me?"- (M. Des Barres, Monarch) - 4:35
4. "Dynamite" - (Monarch, Hyde) - 5:25
5. "Something Beautiful" - (M. Des Barres) - 4:19
6. "Warm Love" - (Monarch, Hyde) - 5:24
7. "Betcha Won't Dance" - (M. Des Barres, Bobby Pickett) - 4:24
8. "Fever" - (Monarch, Pickett, Hyde) - 4:40
9. "Tear Jerker" - (Monarch, Kaye, Hyde) - 4:30

Personnel

- Michael Des Barres - lead vocals
- Michael Monarch - guitars
- Tony Kaye - keyboards
- Bobby Pickett - bass, backing vocals (died 2026)
- Jon Hyde - drums, backing vocals, percussion

=== Live from the Atlantic Studios (1978) ===
Track listing

1. "Help Me Up" - (Jon Hyde) - 5:21
2. "Got Enough Love" - (Michael Des Barres, Pamela Des Barres, Michael Monarch) - 4:46
3. "Recognition" - (M. Des Barres, P. Des Barres, Monarch) - 5:22
4. "One More Heartache" - (Monarch, Hyde) - 8:57
5. "Detective Man" - (Monarch, Hyde) - 4:31
6. "Grim Reaper" - (M. Des Barres, Monarch, Bobby Pickett, Hyde) - 5:20
7. "Fever" - (Monarch, Pickett, Hyde) - 5:35
8. "Nightingale" - (Monarch, Hyde) - 5:49
9. "Tear Jerker / Good Rockin' Tonight" - (Monarch, Kaye, Hyde / Roy Brown) - 5:41

Personnel

- Michael Des Barres - lead vocals
- Michael Monarch - guitar
- Tony Kaye - keyboards
- Bobby Pickett - bass, backing vocals
- Jon Hyde - drums, percussion
