= Open Fire (Y&T album) =

Live album by Y&T
- Released: 24 June 1985
- Recorded: 1985
- Venue: various venues around London; The Keystone, Palo Alto, California
- Studio: Sound City Studios, Van Nuys, California
- Genre: Hard rock, heavy metal
- Length: 48:07
- Label: A&M
- Producer: Scott Boorey and Y&T

Y&T chronology
In Rock We Trust (1984)	Open Fire (1985)	Down for the Count (1985)

Professional ratings
Review scores
Source	Rating
AllMusic	4/5 stars

Open Fire is the first live album released by American hard rock/heavy metal band Y&T, released in 1985 by A&M Records, produced by Scott Boorey and the band.

The live material on the album was recorded at various venues in Greater London in early 1985, and during April 5–6, 1985, at the Keystone club in Palo Alto, California. The Keystone songs – "Go For the Throat" and "Open Fire" – were recorded by Guy Charbonneau in Le Mobile, a mobile recording studio. All of the live tracks were remixed at A&M Studios.

The song "Summertime Girls" is a studio recording, produced and engineered separately by Kevin Beamish at Sound City Studios in Van Nuys.

== Reception ==
Open Fire would prove to be a success, spending 17 weeks on the Billboard 200, and peaking at Number 70. The album introduced the song "Summertime Girls" which would go on to become the band's biggest hit, peaking at Number 16 on the Billboard Mainstream Rock Chart. The song also appeared on the band's next proper studio album, Down for the Count, which was released in November 1985.

Despite this, Open Fire would go on to become on the hardest albums to find by the band until Hip-O Records (a subsidiary of Universal that specializes in reissuing previously out-of-print albums and themed music compilations) reissued it with two bonus tracks in 2005. The bonus material consisted of live renditions of "Black Tiger" (which was previously unreleased) and "Summertime Girls." The live version of "Summertime Girls" also appeared as the B-side of the studio cut when it was released as a single. In the same year, Majestic Rock Records also released the album on CD using the track list of the vinyl release. It featured a different front cover, but the back cover was the same as the original A&M release, as well as the Hip-O reissue.

== Track listing ==
Side one
No.	Title	Length
1.	"Open Fire"	4:26
2.	"Go for the Throat"	4:51
3.	"25 Hours a Day"	4:22
4.	"Rescue Me"	5:53

Side two
No.	Title	Length
5.	"Summertime Girls" (Studio Version)	3:30
6.	"Forever"	5:55
7.	"Barroom Boogie"	4:35
8.	"I Believe in You"	8:02

Bonus tracks on Hip-O Reissue
No.	Title	Length
9.	"Black Tiger" (Previously Unreleased Bonus Track)	4:57
10.	"Summertime Girls" (Live Version)	4:39

== Personnel ==
- Dave Meniketti – vocals, guitar
- Joey Alves – guitar, vocals
- Phil Kennemore – bass, vocals
- Leonard Haze – drums, percussion

Additional personal

- John Nymann, Bill Costa – backing vocals

Production

- Scott Boorey, Y&T – producers
- Adam Day, Pete Deanda – technicians
- Nigel James – production management
- Kevin Beamish – producer on track 5
- Niko Bolas – remixing at A&M Studios, Los Angeles, California, US
- Bill Traut, Scott Boorey, Quadrangle management – management
- Chuck Beeson – art direction

== Chart ==
Chart (1985)	Peak position
Swedish Albums (Sverigetopplistan)	43
US Billboard 200	70
