= Tadashi Suetsugi =

Tadashi Suetsugi (末次忠司, Suetsugi Tadashi; born 1958) is a Japanese academic, civil engineer and writer interested in hydrology, comprehensive river engineering and disaster mitigation.

Tadashi is an administrator in Japan's Ministry of Land, Infrastructure, Transport and Tourism (MLIT). He played a leadership role in the Edogawa River Project, also known as the G-Cans project.

== Selected works ==
In a statistical overview derived from writings by and about Tadashi Suetsugi, OCLC/WorldCat encompasses roughly 10+ works in 10+ publications in 1 language and 10+ library holdings.

- 現場技術者のための河川構造物維持管理の実際 (2005)
- 河川の減災マニュアル: 現場で役立つ実践的減災読本 (2009)
- 河川技術ハンドブック: 総合河川学から見た治水・環境 (2010)

Research papers

Tadashi is the lead author of a range of technical notes published by the National Institute for Land and Infrastructure Management (NILIM), e.g.,

- No. 32, "Influence of Sediment Transport on Topography and Bed Material Change at River Mouth Estuary," March 2002.
- No. 69, "Improvement of the Riverbed Fluctuation Model For the Prediction of Sediment Transport in the Case of Hinuma River," March 2003.
- No. 158, "Hydraulic Resistance by Flexible and Tall Plant Communities," January 2004.
- No. 231, "Keynote for Sediment Management Policy for the sake of Watershed Management considering Spatial-time Discontinuity of Sediment Flow," March 2005.
- No. 234, "Study on the prediction method of the erosion width of cohesive banks by flood flow," March 2005.
- No. 236, "Sediment and Nutrient transport at Terrestrial Environment and River Mouth Estuary," March 2005.
