= John Taylor Dismukes =

American painter

John Taylor Dismukes is an artist, whose work has appeared in a variety of media.

== Biography ==
John Taylor Dismukes began his career as an illustrator in the city of Hollywood, California. Dismukes had established the JTD & Associates company in the year of 1985. The company was established when computer technology was beginning to take over the industry.

== Education ==
John Taylor Dismukes received his education of art through the institution known as the Art Center College of Design, which is located in Pasadena, California.

== Works ==
His paintings have been used as record album covers, film posters, and graphic novel covers. His work also includes 2D and 3D computer illustration.

Album covers for:

- Y&T
- The Right to Rock
- Foreigner
- The Grateful Dead
- Steppenwolf

Posters:

- Charlotte's Web
- Mad Max Beyond Thunderdome
- Star Trek
- Star Wars
  - Boba Fett lithograph (1998)
  - Stormtroopers under the door lithograph (1998)
  - 3-panel vehicles lithograph (1999)
- The Addams Family

Comic covers:

- Insider (May 1992 cover)
- The Terminator: Hunters and Killers (all three issues)

Logos:

- ET
- The Lost World: Jurassic Park
- Megadeth – Countdown to Extinction & Exposure of a Dream
