= Tadashi Fukami =

Japanese-American ecologist

Tadashi Fukami (Japanese: 深見 理) is a Japanese-American ecologist. He is an associate Professor of Biology and community ecologist at Stanford University. He is currently the head of Fukami Lab which is a community ecology research group that focuses on "historical contingency in the assembly of ecological communities." Fukami is an elected Fellow of the Ecological Society of America.

== Early life and education ==
In an interview with Oikos Editorial Office, Fukami explains that even though he grew up near Tokyo, he would visit Wakayama with his family for vacation several times a year, sparking his interest in nature.

Fukami received his Bachelor's degree from Waseda University in 1996, his Master's degree at the University of Tokyo in 1998, and his Ph.D. in ecology and evolutionary biology at the University of Tennessee, Knoxville, in 2003.

== Career and research ==
Fukami was a postdoctoral fellow at Landcare Research in New Zealand from 2003-2005. He then went on to be an assistant professor at the University of Hawaii at Manoa from 2006-2008. He has been at Stanford University since 2008.

Fukami's work has aimed to better understand how patterns of species immigration into communities, including via dispersal, influences community assembly. In 2019, he was elected as a fellow to the Ecological Society of America for his "contributions to advancing community, ecosystem, and evolutionary ecology through a novel focus on historical contingency in community assembly". His work has also explored how historical contingency and priority effects influences the function as well as the structure of ecological communities.

== Notable publications ==
Fukami's research on community ecology, community assembly, alternate stable states and historical contingency has been published in multiple academic journals. Below, some of his most-cited papers are listed.

=== Selected publications ===
- McFall-Ngai, M., Hadfield, M.G., Bosch, T.C., Carey, H.V., Domazet-Lošo, T., Douglas, A.E., Dubilier, N., Eberl, G., Fukami, T., Gilbert, S.F. and Hentschel, U., 2013. Animals in a bacterial world, a new imperative for the life sciences. Proceedings of the National Academy of Sciences, 110(9), pp.3229-3236.
- Nemergut, D.R., Schmidt, S.K., Fukami, T., O'Neill, S.P., Bilinski, T.M., Stanish, L.F., Knelman, J.E., Darcy, J.L., Lynch, R.C., Wickey, P. and Ferrenberg, S., 2013. Patterns and processes of microbial community assembly. Microbiology and Molecular Biology Reviews, 77(3), pp.342-356.
- Fukami, T., 2015. Historical contingency in community assembly: integrating niches, species pools, and priority effects. Annual Review of Ecology, Evolution, and Systematics, 46, pp.1-23.
- Fukami, T., Martijn Bezemer, T., Mortimer, S.R. and van der Putten, W.H., 2005. Species divergence and trait convergence in experimental plant community assembly. Ecology letters, 8(12), pp.1283-1290.
- Fukami, T., Dickie, I.A., Paula Wilkie, J., Paulus, B.C., Park, D., Roberts, A., Buchanan, P.K. and Allen, R.B., 2010. Assembly history dictates ecosystem functioning: evidence from wood decomposer communities. Ecology letters, 13(6), pp.675-684.
- Fukami, T. and Wardle, D.A., 2005. Long-term ecological dynamics: reciprocal insights from natural and anthropogenic gradients. Proceedings of the Royal Society B: Biological Sciences, 272(1577), pp.2105-2115.

== Honors and awards ==
Awards include:

- Fellow, Ecological Society of America (2019)
- Presidential Award, American Society of Naturalists (2019)
- Outstanding Ecological Theory Paper Award, Ecological Society of America Theoretical Ecology Section (2017)
- Dean’s Award for Distinguished Teaching, School of Humanities and Sciences, Stanford University (2015)
- Science prize for inquiry-based instruction, Science magazine, AAAS (2013)
- CAREER award, National Science Foundation (2012)
- Denzaburo Miyadi Award, Ecological Society of Japan (2005)
