= Y&T =

American rock band

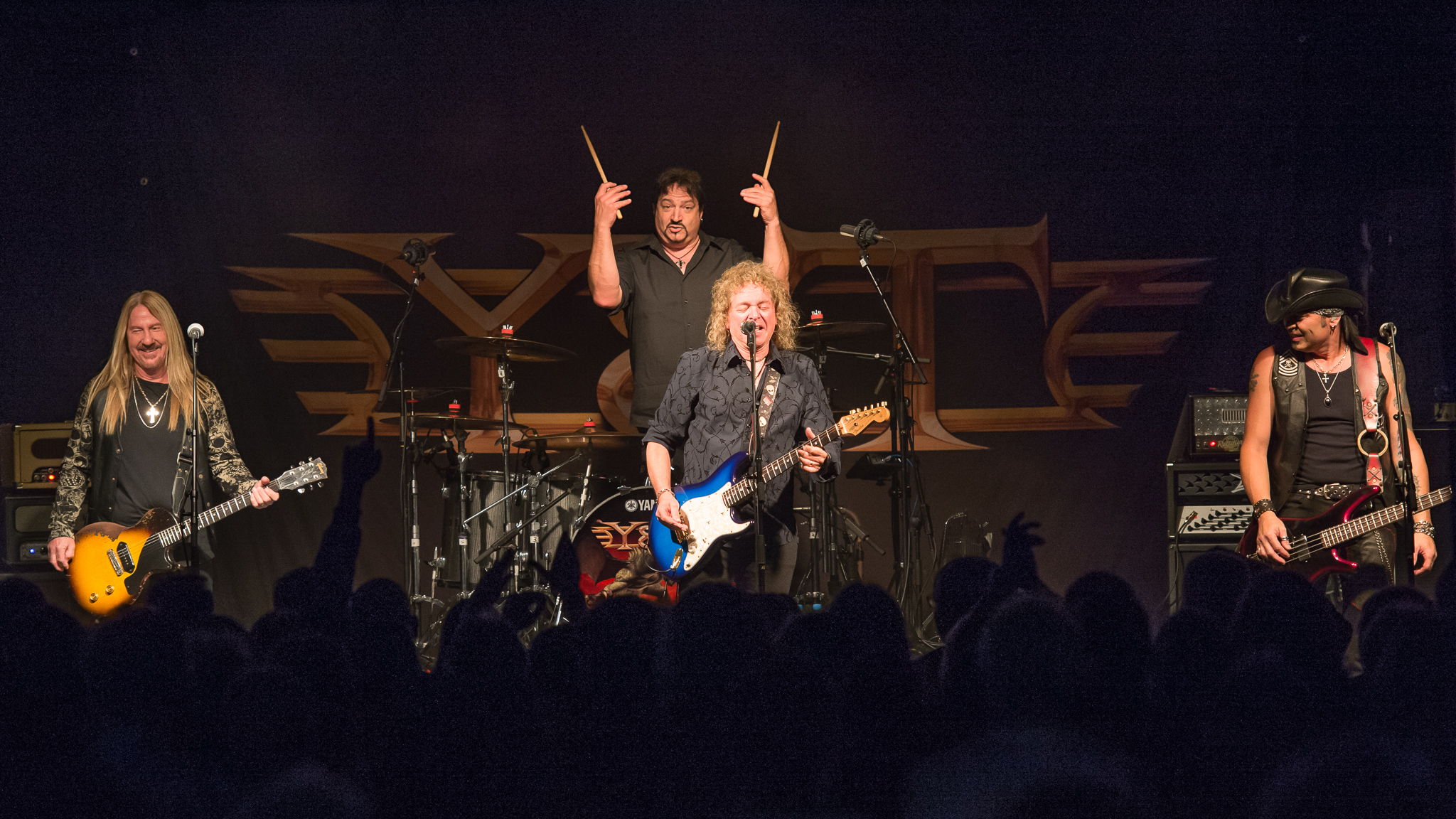
- Y&T in 2016

Background information
- Also known as: Yesterday & Today
- Origin: Oakland, California, U.S.
- Genres: Heavy metal; hard rock; glam metal
- Years active: 1974–1991; 1995–1997; 2001–present
- Labels: London; A&M; Universal; Geffen; Metal Blade; Avex; Hip-O; Frontiers
- Members: Dave Meniketti; John Nymann; Mike Vanderhule; Aaron Leigh
- Past members: Leonard Haze; Phil Kennemore; Joey Alves; Jimmy DeGrasso; Stef Burns; Brad Lang
- Website: yandtrocks.com

Y&T (originally known as Yesterday & Today) is an American hard rock/heavy metal band that formed in Oakland, California; the classic lineup that recorded the first album was cemented in 1974. The band released two studio albums on London Records as Yesterday & Today in the 1970s before shortening their name to Y&T, after which they released several albums on A&M Records beginning in 1981, and later on Geffen Records, Avex Records, and more. The band was originally co-managed by Herbie Herbert and Louis "Lou" Bramy. The band has sold millions of albums worldwide to date: 18 albums, three greatest hits collections, and a boxed set.

== Biography ==
=== Early years (1972–1983) ===
In 1972, Leonard Haze, Bob Gardner, and Wayne Stitzer formed an unnamed band in Oakland, California, that jammed only cover tunes when Dave Meniketti joined that same year as guitar player. Soon after, the band received a call for their first gig, but they needed a name. According to Meniketti and Haze, Haze chose the name of the album that was playing on his turntable at that moment – Yesterday and Today – a studio album by the Beatles. The first lineup – which only played covers of songs by other artists – consisted of Haze on drums, Stitzer on piano, Gardner on bass, and Meniketti on lead vocals and lead guitar. After Stitzer quit the group, Gardner switched from bass to rhythm guitar and piano, and Phil Kennemore was brought in to play bass. In 1973, Gardner left the group; he was replaced by Joey Alves in January 1974. This 1974 lineup change was when the band began writing original material.

Throughout the mid-1970s, this classic lineup performed shows with Journey and many other acts, including Queen; during a show as part of the latter's Night at the Opera tour, Y&T were seen by the president of London Records and were subsequently signed to the label. London released the band's first two studio albums, a self-titled debut and Struck Down, in 1976 and 1978, respectively. While finishing their second album, London disclosed they would be removing the rock genre from their label, and Meniketti has since commented that this essentially meant that the Struck Down album "would go nowhere." The band continued to tour extensively in the '70s, building up to headliners while they opened for bands such as Wild Cherry, Kiss, AC/DC, and more.

As Meniketti has said in numerous radio, television, and magazine interviews over the past five-plus decades, it was the new record deal ("which took forever" [to secure]) in 1980 with A&M Records that prompted the band to shorten their name to simply Y&T, which was influenced by their encores where fans would chant, "Y&T, Y&T, Y&T."

The band's first two studio albums under A&M, Earthshaker (1981) and Black Tiger (1982) earned good reviews but did not gain mainstream exposure in America. Black Tiger was recorded at Ridge Farm, in Dorking, County of Surrey, England, and produced by Max Norman. The classic Y&T logo made its first appearance on the cover of this album. Part-way through recording Black Tiger, Y&T played their first shows outside of the US—the Pink Pop Festival with ZZ Top in The Netherlands, followed by the band's first headline tour of the UK.

Also in 1982, Y&T performed at the UK's Reading Festival and toured for two months with AC/DC throughout the UK and Europe.

In 1983, Y&T continued to play larger venues, such as arenas, stadiums, and amphitheaters across America and Europe with a variety of acts, such as Alice Cooper, Blackfoot, Dio, Iron Maiden, Marillion, Mötley Crüe, Ozzy Osbourne, Twisted Sister, garnering far more mainstream recognition in Europe and Japan than they did in their native United States. With their third A&M release, Mean Streak (1983), radio airplay and exposure had increased in the US despite poor promotion from the record company.

=== Commercial success and brief hiatus (1984–1991) ===
Y&T's sixth studio album, In Rock We Trust, released in 1984, became the band's highest-charting and selling album, reaching No. 46 on the Billboard 200. The album produced Y&T's first big radio hit "Don't Stop Runnin'". Dr Pepper acquired the rights to use "She's a Liar" in a radio ad campaign. In Rock We Trust was the only Y&T album to chart in Canada, reaching No. 77 on the RPM chart. The label brought in writer Geoffrey Leib for the album, the first time an external writer had been used. The success of In Rock We Trust, which saw the band continuing to perform at arenas and stadiums (including opening for Rush and Dio on their tours for Grace Under Pressure and The Last in Line respectively, as well as shows with Whitesnake, Twisted Sister, Ratt, Dokken, and Night Ranger), and participating in the 1984 edition of Monsters of Rock at Donington Park in England, gave Y&T better exposure than they had enjoyed previously.

Y&T's 1985 hit "Summertime Girls", initially featured as the sole studio track on the band's first live album, Open Fire, and later also featured on their seventh (studio) album Down for the Count released later the same year, became the band's highest-charting hit to date, reaching No. 55 on the Billboard Hot 100 and No. 16 on the Mainstream Rock songs chart. It received airplay worldwide, played frequently in the Baywatch television series, featured in several feature films (including Real Genius), received heavy rotation on MTV as well as MTV's top video playlists, and continues to get regular airplay today on classic rock radio stations throughout the United States. Down for the Count would be the band's last album for A&M, as the band grew increasingly frustrated with the lack of promotion from the label within the US. Despite successful tours with Mötley Crüe and Aerosmith, and the chart success of "Summertime Girls", the label declined to release a follow-up single. On his recollection of Down for the Count, Meniketti said in an interview for Metal Express Radio: ". . . it ended up being a sort of wasted record . . . it was out right when the record company didn't care about us." In present day, the band still performs tracks from the album in their live shows.

In 1986, Y&T changed record labels to Geffen, and in that same year, Haze was fired for drug abuse issues (as Haze, band, and management discuss in the documentary "Y&T: On With the Show"), and was replaced by Jimmy DeGrasso. Decades later when interviewed for the documentary Y&T: On With the Show, Haze said, "I would've fired me, too."

In 1987, the eighth album Contagious was released. In 1989, Alves was fired for drug abuse and was replaced by Stef Burns. (DeGrasso and Burns later played together with Alice Cooper in the 1990s.) Y&T's next studio album Ten was released in 1990. The album features ballads such as "Don't Be Afraid of the Dark" (the first and only single from the album), "Ten Lovers", and "Come in from the Rain", together with a few straightforward hard rock songs, including "Hard Times", "City", "Surrender", and "Goin' Off the Deep End". According to Meniketti, the video for "Don't Be Afraid of the Dark" was probably the best video they ever made, but with the onset of grunge he never once saw it on MTV.

With the record company opting not to release any further singles from the Ten album, the band decided to do seven shows in California and take a break in 1991, concluding with the live album Yesterday & Today Live. Shortly after the 1991 hiatus, Meniketti declined an opportunity to form a proposed 'super group' with Peter Frampton.

=== Resurgence (1995–present) ===
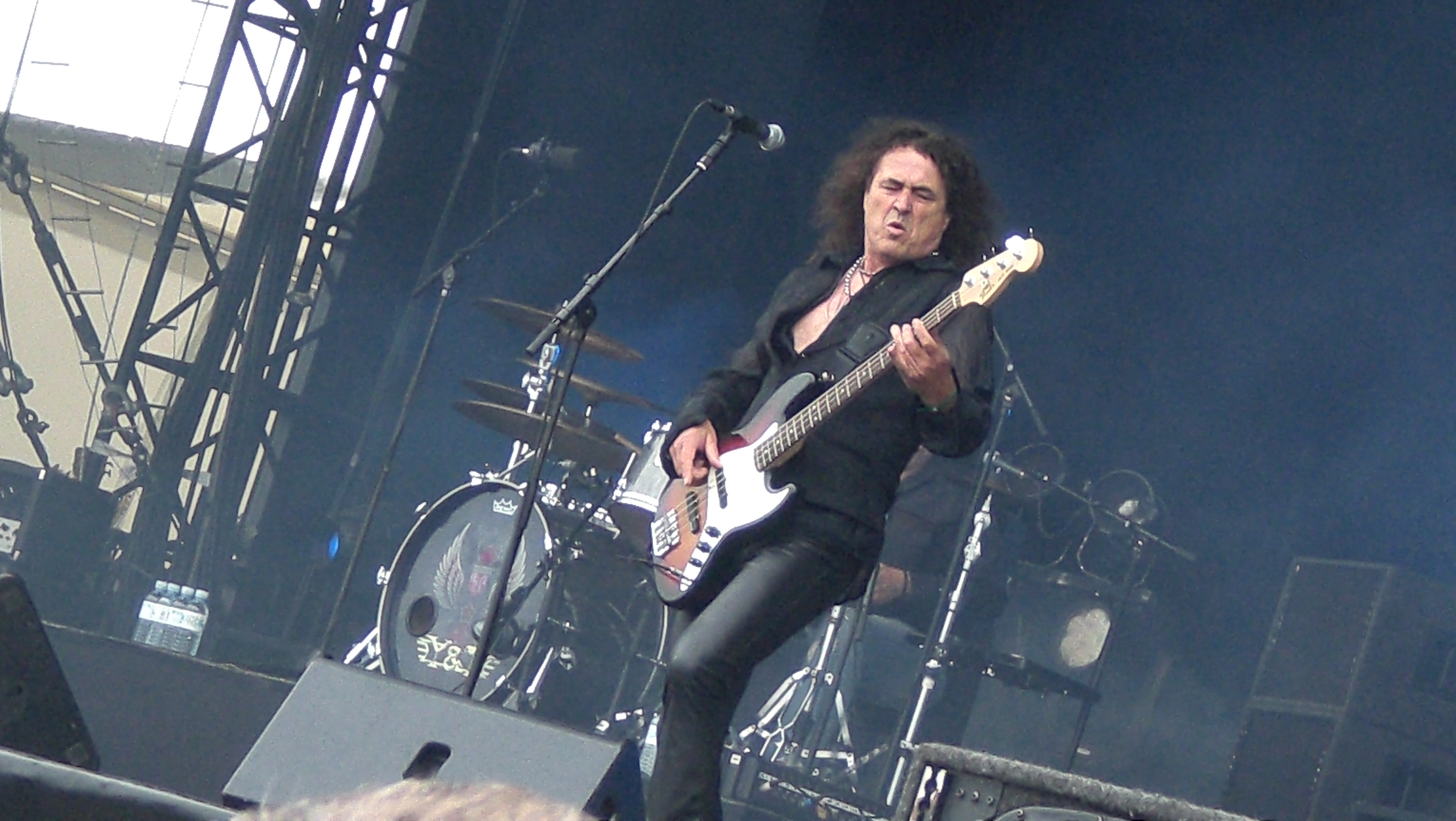
Phil Kennemore at Hellfest in France, 2010

In 1995, Y&T resumed with the same lineup of Meniketti, Burns, Kennemore, and DeGrasso, releasing Musically Incorrect in 1995 and Endangered Species in 1997. The band performed sporadically during the mid-to-late 1990s. However, in 2001, Haze returned on drums. At the time, Burns was in three bands: Y&T, Huey Lewis and the News, and Italy's biggest rock star, Vasco Rossi; scheduling conflicts forced Burns to drop one of the three bands, and so in 2003 he left Y&T. He was replaced by rhythm guitarist/backing vocalist, John Nymann, who was a childhood friend of the band, and who had previously toured on the In Rock We Trust tour as a background vocalist, as Rock the Robot, and he sang backing vocals on Down for the Count.

In 2003, Y&T resumed touring the world. In 2006 as Haze's drug abuse continued creating issues, he was asked to step down and was replaced by Mike Vanderhule on drums.

In 2009, Y&T began writing their twelfth studio album, released in May 2010, titled Facemelter on their own label in the US. It was their first studio album in thirteen years (since 1997's Endangered Species) and was consequently licensed to the Italian label Frontiers Records for the rest of the world.

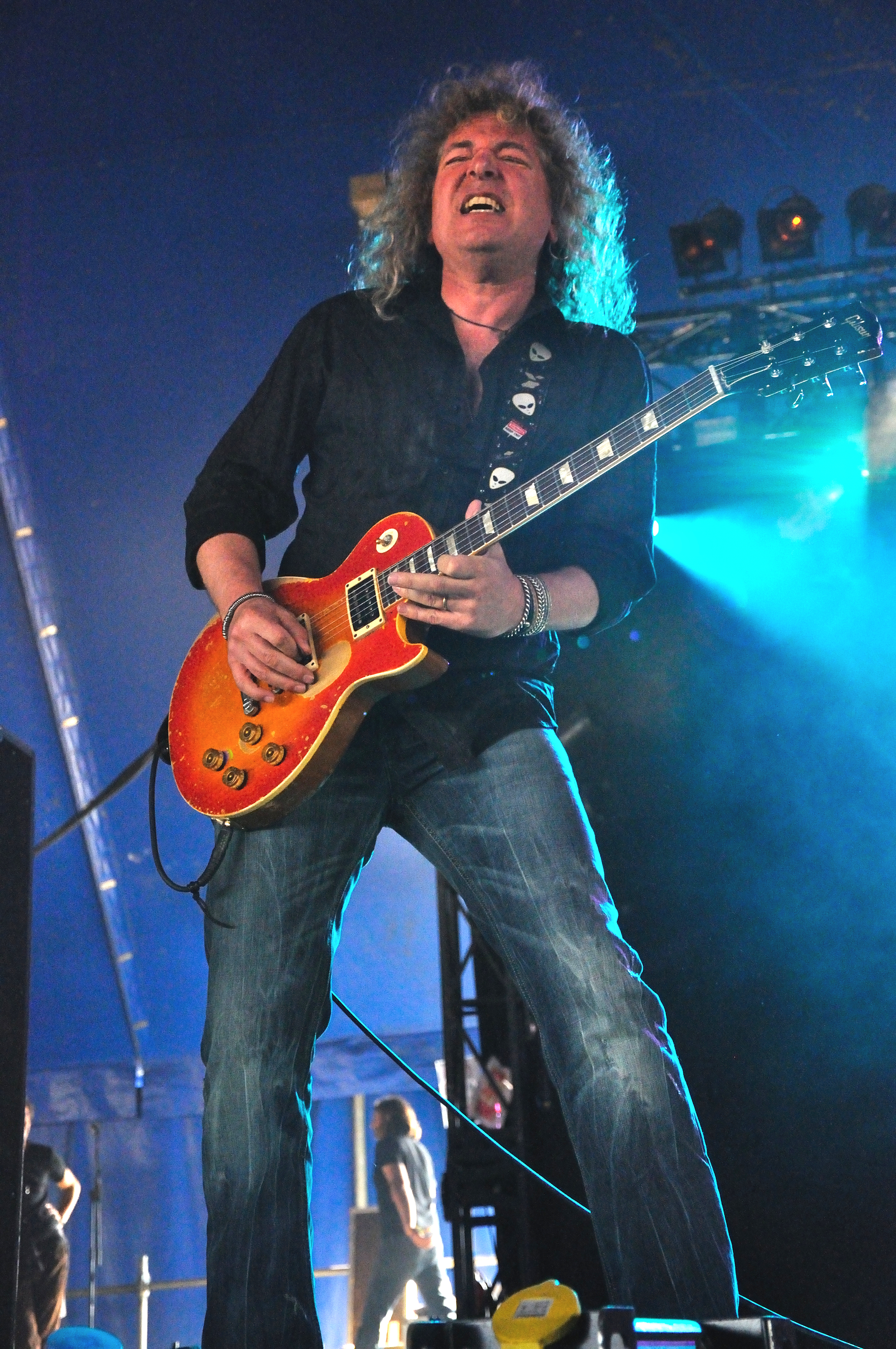
Dave Meniketti at Download Festival 2010, Donington, UK

In June 2010, Y&T toured the world in support of Facemelter, performing the big European summer festivals, such as Sweden Rock, Download Festival at Donington Park, UK, and Hellfest in Clisson, France. During this world tour, bassist Kennemore experienced health issues; that summer, while on the US leg of the 2010 world tour, he was diagnosed with stage IV lung cancer. Upon receiving doctor's orders to leave the tour and begin treatment, Kennemore urged Meniketti to find a replacement and continue touring.

In July 2010, the group enlisted Brad Lang, bass player from the band Jet Red, to step in and finish Y&T's tour promoting Facemelter, as Kennemore wanted the tour to carry on during his fight with cancer. On January 7, 2011, bassist Kennemore died of lung cancer at the age of 57 after a short illness. Kennemore and Meniketti had been the only constant members of the band since the original 1974 lineup. After Kennemore's untimely passing, Lang filled the bass position.

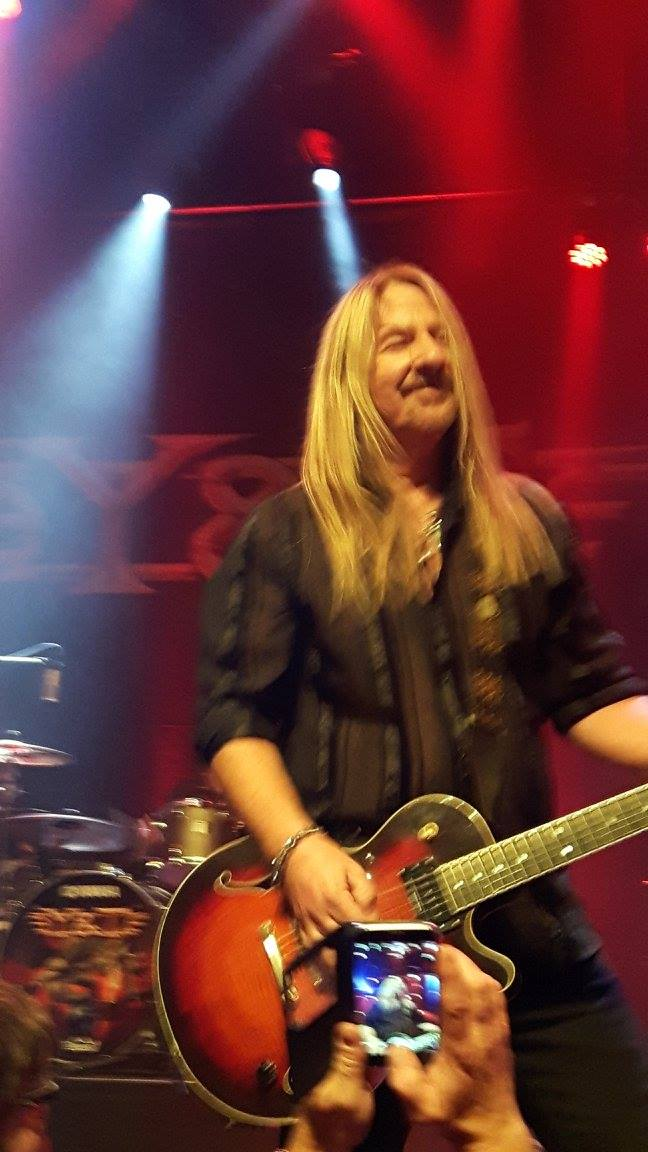
John Nymann in Gebr. De Nobel, Leiden, Netherlands, 2015

On October 19, 2013, in Bellagio, Italy, Stef Burns joined the band onstage for four songs ("Black Tiger", "Dirty Girl", "Midnight In Tokyo", and "Hurricane") in a reunion of sorts since Burns had been busy touring with Huey Lewis and the News and Vasco Rossi. This one-time reunion was well received by the fans, as one would expect.

In April 2016, Lang left the band to address his alcohol dependency issues; his last show with Y&T was on April 2, 2016, at the Fillmore in San Francisco. Lang's friend Aaron Leigh (Frank Hannon Band) stepped in, his first show on April 14 at the Canyon Club in Agoura Hills, CA. On June 29, 2016, Y&T and Lang announced separately on their own Facebook pages that they had mutually and amicably parted ways, confirming that Leigh would remain as the band's bassist.

Original drummer Haze died on September 11, 2016, at the age of 61 after a long battle with chronic obstructive pulmonary disease. Original rhythm guitarist Alves died on March 12, 2017, at the age of 63 from ulcerative colitis and inflammatory bowel disease. Alves' death left Meniketti as the last surviving member from the band's original, classic lineup.

In January 2018, Y&T released their first-ever acoustic EP titled Acoustic Classix Vol. 1. In June 2018, Meniketti said that the band might release more acoustic EPs in the future.

On November 26, 2019, the fan-backed (on Kickstarter) documentary On With The Show was released.

== Legacy ==
"Summertime Girls" appeared on the soundtrack to the 1985 film Real Genius as well as an episode of Season 1 of HBO's Peacemaker (TV series).

In the movie Anvil! The Story of Anvil, in the bonus feature interview Lars Ulrich of Metallica talks at length about seeing one of his favorite bands, Y&T, for the first time at a club in Hollywood in December 1980. Ulrich credits Y&T as the reason he decided to become a musician, saying: "That was the turning point for me wanting to play music. . . . You could tell that they loved what they were doing."

== Band members ==
Current members

- Dave Meniketti – lead guitar, lead vocals (1974–present)
- John Nymann – rhythm guitar, backing vocals (2003–present)
- Mike Vanderhule – drums, backing vocals (2006–present)
- Aaron Leigh – bass, backing vocals (2016–present)

Former members

- Leonard Haze – drums, backing and lead vocals (1974–1986, 2001–2006; died 2016)
- Phil Kennemore – bass, keyboards, backing and lead vocals (1974–2011; died 2011)
- Joey Alves – rhythm guitar, backing vocals (1974–1989; died 2017)
- Jimmy DeGrasso – drums (1986–2001)
- Stef Burns – rhythm guitar, backing vocals (1989–2003)
- Brad Lang – bass, backing vocals (2010–2016)

Session members

- Robert Russ – piano on Struck Down (1978)
- Cherie Currie – backing vocals on Struck Down (1978)
- Galen Cook – organ on Struck Down (1978)
- Randy Nichols – keyboards on Summertime Girls (1985)
- Steffen Presley – keyboards on Contagious (1987)
- Claude Schnell – keyboards on Down for the Count (1985)
- Adam Day – rhythm guitar on Down for the Count (1985)
- Bill Costa – backing vocals on Down for the Count (1985)
- Steve Smith – drums on "Hard Times", "Lucy", "Don't Be Afraid of the Dark", "Girl Crazy", "Come in from the Rain", "Red Hot & Ready", "Let It Out", "Ten Lovers", and "Surrender" from Ten (1990)
- Loren Gold – keyboards on Facemelter (2010)
- Ross McEwen - guitar for Ramblin' Man Fair and Rock & Blues Custom Show Festival, filling in for an ill John Nymann (July 28 & 29, 2017)

== Discography ==
=== Studio albums ===
- Yesterday and Today (1976)
- Struck Down (1978)
- Earthshaker (1981)
- Black Tiger (1982)
- Mean Streak (1983) (US No. 103)
- In Rock We Trust (1984) (US No. 45)
- Down for the Count (1985) (US No. 91)
- Contagious (1987) (US No. 78)
- Ten (1990) (US No. 110)
- Musically Incorrect (1995)
- Endangered Species (1997)
- Facemelter (2010)

=== Extended plays ===
- Acoustic Classix Vol. 1 (2018)

=== Live albums ===
- In Concert (1984) (BBC Transcription Services - Copyright recording for radio broadcast only)
- Open Fire (1985) (US No. 70)
- Yesterday & Today Live (1991)
- Live on the Friday Rock Show (1998) (recorded 1982 and 1984, reissued in 2000 as BBC Live in Concert)
- Live at the Mystic (2012)
- Free to Roll (Live 1985) (2022)

=== Compilation albums ===
- Forever - Best of Y&T (1987) (Japan only)
- Anthology (1989) (UK only)
- Best of '81 to '85 (1990)
- Ultimate Collection (2001)
- Unearthed Vol. 1 - Demos & Unreleased Recordings from 1974 Through 2003 (2003)
- Unearthed Vol. 2 - Demos & Unreleased Recordings from 1974 Through 1989 (2004)
- Earthquake - The A&M Years 1981-1985 (2013) (4-CD box set)

=== Singles ===
Year	Single	Peak chart positions		Album
Year	Single	US	US Main. Rock	Album
1977	"Earthshaker"	—	—	Yesterday and Today (Yesterday and Today album)
1977	"Alcohol"	—	—	Yesterday and Today (Yesterday and Today album)
1981	"I Believe in You"	—	—	Earthshaker (album)
1981	"Rescue Me"	—	—	Earthshaker (album)
1981	"Dirty Girl"	—	—	Earthshaker (album)
1982	"I Don't Wanna Lose"	—	—	Black Tiger (album)
1982	"Forever"	—	—	Black Tiger (album)
1983	"Mean Streak"	—	25	Mean Streak
1984	"Don't Stop Running"	—	33	In Rock We Trust
1985	"Open Fire"	—	—	Open Fire
1985	"Summertime Girls"	55	16	Open Fire
1985	"All American Boy"	—	48	Down for the Count
1985	"Face Like An Angel"	—	—	Down for the Count
1987	"Contagious"	—	41	Contagious
1990	"Don't Be Afraid of the Dark"	—	31	Ten
1991	"Hurricane"	—	—	Yesterday & Today Live
1991	"Don't Stop Runnin"	—	—	Yesterday & Today Live

=== Contributions ===
- Hear 'n Aid (1986)

== Videography ==
Videos

- Live at the San Francisco Civic (1985)

DVDs

- One Hot Night (DVD) (2007)
- Documentary - Y&T: On With the Show (DVD) (2019)

Official promo videos

- "Mean Streak" (from the album Mean Streak, 1983)
- "Don't Stop Runnin'" (from the album In Rock We Trust, 1984)
- "All American Boy" (from the album Down For The Count, 1985)
- "Summertime Girls" (from the album Open Fire, 1985)
- "Lipstick & Leather" (from the album In Rock We Trust, 1984 with Video footage of Live at the San Francisco Civic, 1985)
- "Contagious" (from the album Contagious, 1987)
- "Don't Be Afraid Of The Dark" (from the album Ten, 1990)
- "I'm Coming Home" (from the album Facemelter, 2010)
