= Dave Meniketti =

American hard rock guitarist

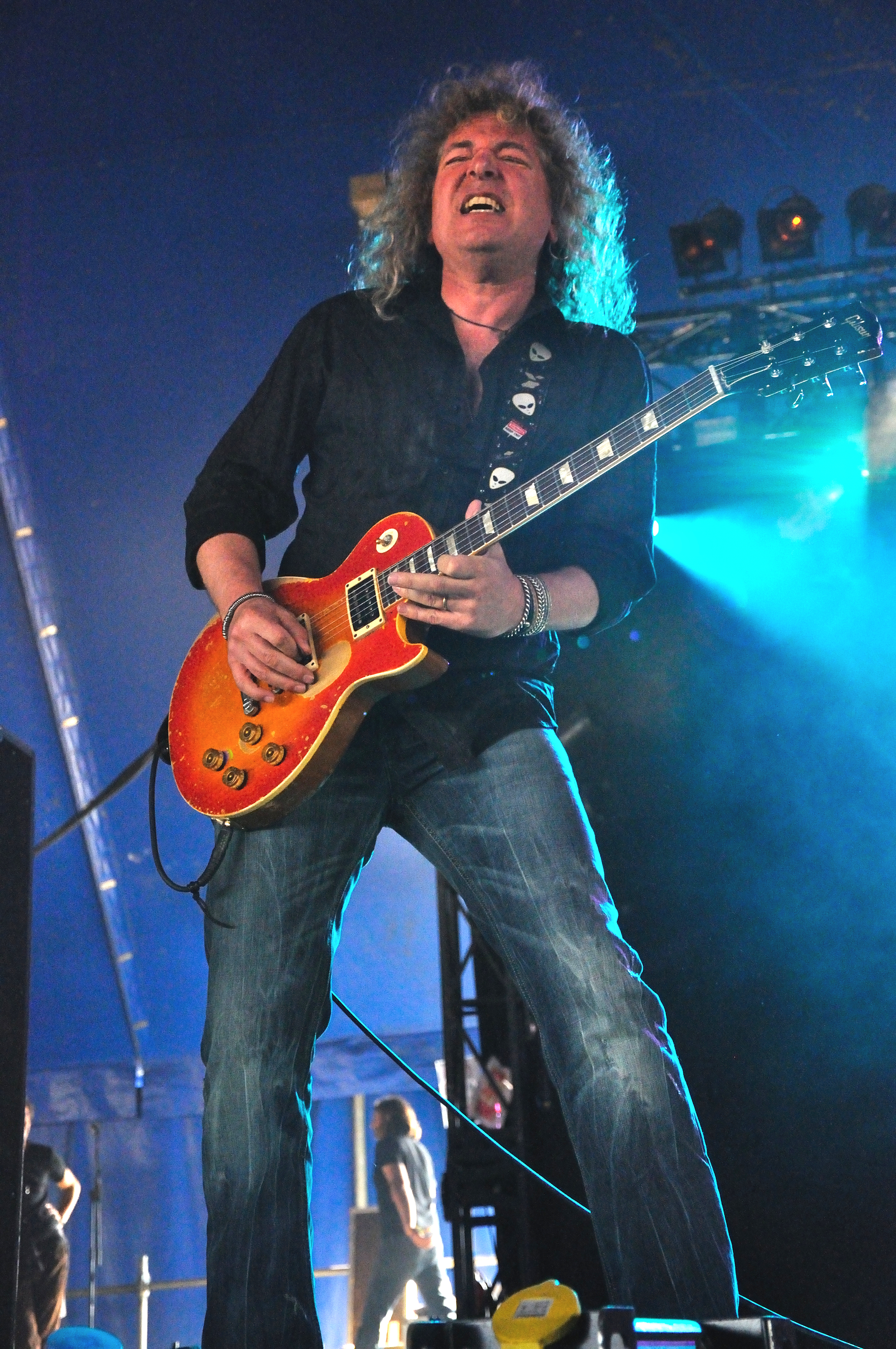
- Dave Meniketti at Download festival, Donington, UK, 2010

Background information
- Born: David Alan Meniketti; December 12, 1953 (age 72); Oakland, California, U.S.
- Genres: Hard rock; heavy metal; glam metal; blues
- Occupations: Musician; songwriter
- Instruments: Vocals; guitar
- Years active: 1969–present
- Labels: London Records (1976–1978); A&M (1981–1985); Geffen (1987–1990); Metal Blade (1991)
- Website: meniketti.com

David Alan Meniketti (born December 12, 1953) is an American musician, best known as singer, songwriter, and lead guitarist for hard rock/heavy metal band Y&T. He has also released three solo efforts (including "Live in Japan"), one of which is more blues-oriented. He currently tours worldwide with Y&T.

With the death of guitarist Joey Alves in March 2017, Meniketti is the last surviving member of the band's classic lineup (1974–1986), which also included bassist Phil Kennemore (d. 2011) and drummer Leonard Haze (d. 2016).

== History ==
Dave Meniketti was born and raised in Oakland, California where he has been a San Francisco Bay Area vocal and guitar musician since the early 1970s. He was influenced by a wide variety of artists growing up, such as Jimi Hendrix, John Coltrane, Leslie West, James Brown, Led Zeppelin. These diverse influences appear in both his singing and his guitar playing. He has been highly ranked in Best Guitarist polls in newspapers, magazines, and television shows around the world—including winning a Bammy Award in 1983 for Best Bay Area Guitarist, and receiving the #5 spot in The Bay Area’s 25 Greatest Guitar Players 2006 ranking from Bay Area News Group.

As the lead singer/lead guitarist with Bay Area rockers Y&T, Meniketti has sold millions of records worldwide. With Y&T, he has recorded 19 albums, and continues to tour the world each year. His style has influenced some of the major stars in rock and over the years he's been asked to join many top bands including Ozzy Osbourne, Peter Frampton, Whitesnake and others. Faith No More, Secret Chiefs 3, and former Mr. Bungle guitarist Trey Spruance said in an interview with Kerrang! magazine in 1991: "... of course, I owe it [his guitar playing speed] all to Y&T. Dave Meniketti is my god."

In the movie Anvil! The Story of Anvil, in the bonus feature interview Lars Ulrich of Metallica talks at length about seeing one of his favorite bands Y&T for the first time at a club in Hollywood in December 1980. Lars Ulrich credits Y&T as the reason he decided to become a musician, saying: "That was the turning point for me wanting to play music. . . . You could tell that they loved what they were doing."

In the early 1990s, while Y&T took a break from recording and performing, Meniketti built his own recording studio and proceeded to record his first solo album titled ON THE BLUE SIDE, which represented his passion for the blues. He would later release a follow-up album simply titled MENIKETTI. Recorded in Tokyo, a live concert CD was released by Avex Records in 2003 titled MENIKETTI LIVE IN JAPAN.

In the summer of 2013, Sammy Hagar invited Dave to perform a set of Montrose tunes with the original Montrose band members for two Northern California shows on Sammy's "Four Decades of Rock" tour. One of the reasons Sammy chose Dave was Hagar's feeling that Meniketti would be the right choice to do justice to the memory and playing style of Ronnie Montrose.

Meniketti and his wife, Jill, produced fine wines for eight years under the Meniketti Wines label, which is no longer active.

== Equipment ==
Currently, Dave plays Gibson Les Pauls and Fender Stratocasters. He has been playing a sunburst Gibson Les Paul Standard since the early 1970s, and even during the late-'80s when such a guitar was considered out of style, as seen in the music video for Contagious. In the 2000s, George Bisceglia of Bisceglia Guitars built Dave a custom made LP style guitar. Meniketti has also been seen playing Fender Stratocasters and Kramer guitars. In 2018 he added Yamaha's new line of Revstar guitars.

For amplification, he uses Diezel VH4 heads, with a Mesa/Boogie Dual Rectifier as a back-up.
