= Handling Ships =

- Directed by: Allan Crick; John Halas
- Written by: Allan Crick; John Halas
- Produced by: John Halas
- Music by: Ernst Hermann Meyer
- Distributed by: (British) Admiralty; Halas and Batchelor (training film, not formally released to theatres)
- Release date: 22 June 1945
- Running time: 70 minutes
- Country: United Kingdom
- Language: English

Handling Ships is a 1945 British stop motion animated film made by Halas and Batchelor. The 70-minute film was created at the request of the British Admiralty, as a training aid for new navigators joining the Royal Navy. Although never formally released to cinemas because of its small target audience, Handling Ships was an "Official Selection" at the 1946 Cannes Film Festival, and is recognised as the first feature-length work, and the first work in Technicolor, in British animation history.

== Background ==
After independent careers in animation, John Halas and Joy Batchelor began working together in 1938, and founded Halas and Batchelor in 1940 to create war information and propaganda films. Approximately 70 films were created for the Ministry of Information, the War Office, and the Admiralty over the course of World War II; most of these were shorts intended to improve morale or spur on increased contributions to the war effort, such as Dustbin Parade, about recycling, and Filling the Gap, about gardening. Halas and Batchelor also created a series of anti-fascist cartoons intended for viewing in the Middle East; starring an Arab boy named Abu, who was "enticed and misguided by the forces of Hitler and Mussolini". The heavy workload (at one point the studios were creating a minute-long short every three weeks) and minimal budgets meant that simple animations with economically driven stories were the norm.

== Description ==
Halas and Batchelor were approached by the Admiralty to create an instructional film for Royal Navy navigation trainees; according to Halas, the intent was to "stop young people from driving a ship like it was a car". The film was not intended as a propaganda work, instead serving as a precise guide to manoeuvring and navigating ships, along with aspects of general ship handling and control.

For Handling Ships, Halas and Batchelor used stop motion animation of three-dimensional ship models, along with schematic designs, to simplify the intricacies and vagaries of ship movement and educate the viewer. The film was shot in 35 mm and Technicolor. Unlike previous animations by the company, Handling Ships was feature-length, running at 70 minutes: at the time, the longest stop motion production made in the UK. The film was never released to cinema chains, as Halas and Batchelor felt it was too specialised for and of limited appeal to general audiences, and it had no propaganda value.

== Reception and Significance ==
After the war, Handling Ships was entered in the 1946 Cannes Film Festival, where it was a short film "Official Selection".

The work proved the value of stop motion animation for instructional films, and the ability of the studio of Halas and Batchelor at making them, as they were said to have "extended the medium to explain complex ideas with clarity and humour". In 1948, the Home Office commissioned a feature-length training film, Waterford Fire Fighting. This was followed in 1949 by another film for the Admiralty, Submarine Control, for submariner training. Halas and Batchelor were responsible for the animated feature film, Animal Farm, first released in the UK in 1954.
