= Your Very Good Health =

1948 British film by Halas and Batchelor

- Directed by: John Halas; Joy Batchelor
- Written by: John Halas; Joy Batchelor
- Produced by: John Halas; Joy Batchelor
- Music by: Matyas Seiber
- Production company: Halas & Batchelor
- Release date: 1948
- Running time: 8 min 34 sec
- Country: United Kingdom
- Language: English

Your Very Good Health is a 1948 British animated short film directed and written by John Halas and Joy Batchelor. It is a public information film about the foundation of the National Health Service (NHS) and explains how people would be affected by the National Health Service Act 1946 introduced under Clement Attlee.

== Synopsis ==
1948 Charley film, Your Very Good Health.

As Charley cycles around his neighbourhood, a narrator explains the aims and merits of the National Health Service Act. The narrator lists other public health services in existence at the time, and mentions problems with healthcare in Britain, such as the inconsistent coverage provided by hospitals and the limitations of the current insurance scheme for low-paid workers.

Responding to Charley's objections, the film depicts hypothetical scenarios involving Charley falling off his bicycle and his wife becoming ill, in order to illustrate the benefits of the new national health system. The previously doubtful Charley is convinced, and proceeds to convince his neighbour George of the advantages of the new NHS.

== Cast ==
- Jack Train as voice
- Harold Berens as voice
- Geoffrey Sumner as voice

== Production ==
Your Very Good Health was one of a series of government-funded propaganda films featuring the cartoon character Charley, which were produced to educate the public changes introduced under the postwar Labour government. Charley had been created in 1946 by Joy Batchelor, and this was the second film featuring him. Different government departments funded the various films, with Your Very Good Health being sponsored by the Central Office of Information for the Ministry of Health.

== Reception ==
The Monthly Film Bulletin wrote: "This Technicolor cartoon, the second in the "Charley" series, deals with the new National Health Service Scheme. The cartoon character Charley raises various questions about the scheme, which are answered more or less amusingly by the commentator and illustrated with cartoon sequences. Appraisal: This film might be used for light relief in a programme about Social Services either in schools or clubs or for general audiences."
