= Elf (album) =

Studio album by Elf
- Released: August 1972
- Recorded: April–May 1972
- Studio: Studio One, Doraville, GA
- Genre: Blues rock; hard rock; boogie rock
- Length: 34:19
- Label: Epic Records
- Producer: Ian Paice, Roger Glover

Elf chronology
Elf (1972)	Carolina County Ball (1974)

Professional ratings
Review scores
Source	Rating
AllMusic	3.5/5 stars

Elf is the first studio album by Ronnie James Dio's blues rock band called Elf. Produced by Ian Paice and Roger Glover of Deep Purple, the record was released in 1972.

On this album, Dio is credited by his birth name, Ronald Padavona. Though Dio had used "Padavona" for songwriting credits on earlier singles, Dio explained in an interview in 1994 that he used his birth name on this album as a tribute to his parents so that they could see their family name on an album at least once.

After this album, Steve Edwards replaced David Feinstein on guitar, and Craig Gruber took over bass duties, leaving Dio solely as the lead singer. This future lineup, minus Edwards, became the first incarnation of Ritchie Blackmore's Rainbow when guitarist Ritchie Blackmore formed it after leaving Deep Purple.

== Track listing ==
All tracks are written by Gary Driscoll, Micky Lee Soule, David Feinstein, and Ronald Padavona.

No.	Title	Length
1.	"Hoochie Koochie Lady"	5:32
2.	"First Avenue"	4:23
3.	"Never More"	3:50
4.	"I'm Coming Back for You"	3:27
5.	"Sit Down Honey (Everything Will Be Alright)"	3:48
6.	"Dixie Lee Junction"	5:09
7.	"Love Me Like a Woman"	3:47
8.	"Gambler, Gambler"	4:26

== Personnel ==
Elf

- Ronald Padavona (later Ronnie James Dio) – vocals, bass
- David Feinstein – guitars
- Micky Lee Soule – piano
- Gary Driscoll – drums

Additional personnel

- Ian Paice – production
- Roger Glover – production
- Rodney Mills – engineering
- Tub Langford – engineering assistance
- Hiroshi Morishima – cover design
- Ronald Padavona – photography
- David Feinstein – photography
