= Ritchie Blackmore's Rainbow =

- Cover art by David Willardson

Studio album by Rainbow
- Released: 4 August 1975
- Recorded: 20 February – 14 March 1975
- Studio: Musicland (Munich)
- Genres: Hard rock; heavy metal
- Length: 37:14
- Labels: Oyster (UK); Polydor (rest of the world)
- Producers: Ritchie Blackmore, Martin Birch, Ronnie James Dio

Rainbow chronology
Ritchie Blackmore's Rainbow (1975)	Rising (1976)

Ronnie James Dio chronology
Trying to Burn the Sun (1975)	Ritchie Blackmore's Rainbow (1975)	Rising (1976)

Singles from Ritchie Blackmore's Rainbow
- 1. "Man on the Silver Mountain" Released: 17 October 1975

Ritchie Blackmore's Rainbow is the debut studio album by British rock band Rainbow, released on 4 August 1975 in the United States through Polydor Records, and on 5 September 1975 in the United Kingdom through Oyster Records.

The beginning of the musical project was the recording as a solo endeavour of the song "Black Sheep of the Family" by Deep Purple guitarist Ritchie Blackmore with Elf singer Ronnie James Dio. The duo found a good chemistry and wrote more songs, which fused hard rock with classical and medieval music influences. So, when Blackmore left Deep Purple in March 1975, they had already recorded an album involving the other members of Elf in the recording sessions and decided to form a band.

Ritchie Blackmore's Rainbow was a moderate commercial success and received generally positive reception from critics. Despite this, Blackmore was not satisfied with the rehearsals for the tour supporting the release and quickly fired the musicians who had recorded the album, with the exception of Dio.

== Recording ==
During studio sessions in Tampa Bay, Florida on 12 December 1974, Blackmore originally planned to record the solo single "Black Sheep of the Family" and the newly composed "Sixteenth Century Greensleeves", which was to be the B-side. Other musicians involved included singer/lyricist Ronnie James Dio and drummer Gary Driscoll of blues rock band Elf, and cellist Hugh McDowell of ELO. Satisfied with the two tracks, Blackmore decided to extend the sessions to a full album.

The other members of Elf, keyboardist Micky Lee Soule and bassist Craig Gruber, were used for the recording of the album in Musicland Studios in Munich, West Germany during February and March 1975. Though it was originally planned to be a solo album, the record was billed as Ritchie Blackmore's Rainbow, and later progressed as a new band project. Blackmore and Dio did promotional work for the album. While rehearsing for the tour, Blackmore decided to fire Gruber and replace him with Jimmy Bain on bass and after that he fired Driscoll, replacing him with drummer Cozy Powell. Because of that, Soule decided to quit the band, to play on a Roger Glover album and tour with the Ian Gillan Band. Soule was subsequently replaced by keyboardist Tony Carey. The first line-up never performed live, and the live photos used in the album art are of Blackmore while with Deep Purple and of Elf playing live.

The last track of the album, "Still I'm Sad", is an instrumental cover of a song by the Yardbirds from their 1965 album Having a Rave Up with the Yardbirds. A version featuring vocals subsequently appeared on Rainbow's live album On Stage and their 1995 studio album Stranger in Us All.

== Release ==
The original vinyl release had a gate-fold sleeve, although the later budget re-issue on Polydor was reduced to a single sleeve. On the cassette version of the album, Side One features the last five tracks, while Side Two plays the first four. On the case insert and on the cassette itself, "Sixteenth Century Greensleeves" is written as "Sixteen Century Greensleeves".

Ritchie Blackmore's Rainbow was re-issued on CD in re-mastered form in the US in April 1999. The European release followed later in the year.

Vocalist Ronnie James Dio considered this release his favourite Rainbow album.

Despite the title implying the record being a Ritchie Blackmore solo release, in later years Blackmore has jokingly stated that Dio's contributions warranted a re-titling of "Ritchie Blackmore and Ronnie James Dio's Rainbow".

== Reception ==
Professional ratings
Review scores
Source	Rating
AllMusic	2.5/5 stars
Collector's Guide to Heavy Metal	6/10
The Encyclopedia of Popular Music	3/5 stars
The Rolling Stone Record Guide	2/5 stars

The album received mixed reviews from the contemporary press. Some reviewers praised its fantasy/heroic-like lyrical content and the innovative rock style. Others denounced a "lack of imagination in the composing department" and a general lack of intensity. The reviewer for the American magazine Rolling Stone disparaged the album, describing Blackmore's playing "listless and bored in relation to past performances" and the band "a completely anonymous group."

Modern reviews have a similar tenor. AllMusic reviewer wrote that the album has "a few listenable tracks", with young Dio "at his best when he fully gives in to his own and Blackmore's medieval fantasy leanings in hard-rocking tracks like 'Sixteenth Century Greensleeves' and 'Man on the Silver Mountain'", but remarked how the band became "a true embarrassment when they try to lighten up and boogie down." Canadian journalist Martin Popoff noticed that on this album Blackmore "confirms the creative vacuum that was much in evidence towards his last years with Purple", offering a "boring, dated, diluted and largely illogical smorgasbord of guitar rock stylings, all inexpressively played over". He also criticised Martin Birch's dull and inexpensive production, "which ruins what is already a limp noodle of a record" and saved only by the songs 'Man on the Silver Mountain' and 'Sixteenth Century Greensleeves', "which approach the worthiness of Rising".

== Covers ==
The album's songs have been performed by subsequent Rainbow line-ups and Blackmore's other bands.

- "Still I'm Sad" is an instrumental cover of The Yardbirds song from their 1965 album Having a Rave Up with the Yardbirds. Rainbow recorded a vocal version of "Still I'm Sad" on their 1977 live album On Stage, and a studio vocal version on their 1995 album Stranger in Us All.
- Blackmore's Night have released a folk rock cover version of "Self Portrait" on their second studio album Under a Violet Moon in 1999, and "Temple of the King" on 2013's Dancer and the Moon. They also performed a live cover of "Sixteenth Century Greensleeves" (titled as "16th Century Greensleeves") on their 2002 live album Past Times with Good Company.
- Ritchie Blackmore's Rainbow re-recorded "Black Sheep of the Family" in 2019.

== Track listing ==
All tracks are written by Ritchie Blackmore and Ronnie James Dio except where noted. Credits and timings taken from original LP.

Side one
No.	Title	Writer(s)	Length
1.	"Man on the Silver Mountain"		4:38
2.	"Self Portrait"		3:16
3.	"Black Sheep of the Family" (Quatermass cover)	Steve Hammond (Note: Polydor releases credit this track to Hammond/Dio.)	3:20
4.	"Catch the Rainbow"		6:40

Side two
No.	Title	Writer(s)	Length
5.	"Snake Charmer"		4:30
6.	"The Temple of the King"		4:46
7.	"If You Don't Like Rock 'n' Roll"		2:36
8.	"Sixteenth Century Greensleeves"		3:35
9.	"Still I'm Sad (instrumental)" (The Yardbirds cover)	Paul Samwell-Smith, Jim McCarty	3:53

== Personnel ==
Rainbow

- Ritchie Blackmore – guitars, producer
- Ronnie James Dio – vocals (tracks 1–8), producer
- Gary Driscoll – drums
- Craig Gruber – bass
- Mickey Lee Soule (Note: Credited as "Micky Lee Soule" on releases.) – piano, Mellotron, Clavinet, organ

Additional musician

- Shoshana Feinstein (Note: Credited simply as "Shoshana" on releases.) – backing vocals on "Catch the Rainbow" and "Still I'm Sad"

Production

- Martin Birch – producer, engineer, mixing

== Charts ==
Chart (1975–76)	Peak position
Australian Albums (Kent Music Report)	55
Canada Top Albums/CDs (RPM)	83
Japanese Albums (Oricon)	26
New Zealand Albums (RMNZ)	40
Swedish Albums (Sverigetopplistan)	24
UK Albums (Official Charts)	11
US Billboard 200	30

== Certifications ==
Region	Certification	Certified units/sales
United Kingdom (BPI)	Silver	60,000^{^}
^{^} Shipments figures based on certification alone.
