= The Candlemaker (film) =

1956 British film by Halas and Batchelor

- Directed by: John Halas; Joy Batchelor
- Produced by: John Halas; Joy Batchelor
- Music by: Mátyás Seiber
- Animation by: Harold Whitaker; Vic Beavis; John Smith; John Williams
- Production company: Halas and Batchelor
- Distributed by: ULCA Films
- Release date: December 25, 1956
- Running time: 13 minutes
- Country: United Kingdom
- Language: English

The Candlemaker is a 1956 animated short film directed by John Halas and Joy Batchelor for the United Lutheran Church in America. The story is about a candlemaker and his son at Christmas time.

== Synopsis ==
A candlemaker delivers candles to faraway customers, leaving his son Tom to produce candles for the church's Christmas services. Tom forgets about his duty and rushes to deliver the candle on time, and the Christmas services are poorly lit. The next day, Tom prepares a new candle, demonstrating the values of responsibility and Christian stewardship.

== See also ==
- List of Christmas films
