= If Life Was Easy =

Studio album by Roger Glover and The Guilty Party
- Released: July 11, 2011
- Recorded: 2007
- Genre: Roots rock, blues rock, hard rock, progressive rock
- Length: 54:38
- Label: Eagle
- Producer: Roger Glover, Peter Denenberg

Roger Glover and The Guilty Party chronology
Snapshot (2002)	If Life Was Easy (2011)

Professional ratings
Review scores
Source	Rating
AllMusic	3.5/5 stars

If Life Was Easy is the fifth solo album by Deep Purple's bass player Roger Glover released by earMusic/edel on July 11, 2011. The album was recorded in 2007, but for personal reasons, it was not released until 2011. Like its predecessor, Snapshot (2002), it features The Guilty Party which includes Randall Bramblett and Gillian Glover. Guest appearances are from Nazareth's Dan McCafferty and Pete Agnew as well as Walther Gallay and Sahaj Ticotin.

== Track list ==
Written By Roger Glover, except noted

1. "Don't Look Now (Everything Has Changed)" (Roger Glover/Randall Bramblett)
2. "The Dream I Had"
3. "Moonlight"
4. "The Car Won't Start"
5. "Box of Tricks"
6. "Stand Together" (Glover/Bramblett)
7. "If Life Was Easy"
8. "Welcome To The Moon"
9. "Set Your Imagination Free" (Glover/Gillian Glover)
10. "When Life Gets to the Bone"
11. "When The Day Is Done"
12. "Get Away (Can't Let You)" (Glover/Glover)
13. "Staring Into Space"
14. "The Ghost Of Your Smile"
15. "Cruel World"
16. "Feel Like a King"

== Personnel ==
- Roger Glover – bass, vocals, baglama, guitar, piano, programming, percussion, harmonica, synthesizer
- Randall Bramblett – vocals, keyboards, saxophone
- Joe Bonadio – drums, percussion, electric drill
- Oz Noy – guitars
- Harvey Jones – synthesizers
- Eliot Denenberg – drums, guitar atmosphere
- Joe Mennonna – horns, horn arrangement
- Nick Moroch – guitar
- Dan McCafferty – vocals
- Pete Agnew – vocals
- Gillian Glover – vocals
- Walther Gallay – vocals
- Mickey Lee Soule – vocals
- Sahaj Ticotin – vocals
- Sim Jones – strings, string arrangement
- Don Airey – pianet

== Production notes ==
- Produced by Roger Glover and Peter Denenberg.
- Pre-production recording by Roger Glover.
- Recorded and mixed by Peter Denenberg at Acme Studios, Mamaroneck, New York.
- Assisted by Jonathan Jetter and Michael Messier.
- Cover art: front photograph by Roger Glover, finessed by Travis Porter, portrait by Myriam Freitag.
