= The Gargantuan Elf Album =

Compilation album by Elf
- Released: 1978
- Genre: Blues rock

Elf chronology
Trying to Burn the Sun (1975)	The Gargantuan Elf Album (1978)	The Elf Albums (1994)

The Gargantuan Elf Album compiles Elf's second and third albums, Carolina County Ball and Trying to Burn the Sun, with the exclusion of the song "Happy".

== Track listing ==
1. "Carolina County Ball" - 4:46
2. "L.A. 59" - 4:21
3. "Ain't It All Amusing" - 5:01
4. "Annie New Oreleans" - 3:01
5. "Rocking Chair Rock 'n' Roll Blues" - 5:36
6. "Rainbow" - 4:00
7. "Do the Same Thing" - 3:10
8. "Blanche" - 2:31
9. "Black Swampy Water" - 3:43
10. "Prentice Wood" - 4:37
11. "When She Smiles" - 4:54
12. "Good Time Music" - 4:30
13. "Liberty Road" - 3:22
14. "Shotgun Boogie" - 3:07
15. "Wonderworld" - 5:03
16. "Streetwalker" - 7:07
