= Bible Black (band) =

American rock band

- Origin: New York, United States
- Genres: Hard rock, heavy metal
- Years active: 1980–1985
- Label: Combat Records
- Past members: Andrew "Duck" MacDonald; Gary Driscoll; Craig Gruber; Jeff Fenholt; Eric Adams; Joey Belladonna

Bible Black was an American band, formed by two ex-Elf/Rainbow musicians: drummer Gary Driscoll and bassist Craig Gruber. It also featured guitarist Duck McDonald, Joey Belladonna (who later departed to join Anthrax), and singer Jeff Fenholt (famous for his lead role in Jesus Christ Superstar).

The band, based on the East Coast, recorded two demo songs with singer Louis Murello (aka Eric Adams of heavy metal band Manowar). A few months later, they recorded the self-titled album Bible Black in 1981 with Jeff Fenholt on vocals, although they did not have a record contract. They then recorded two demos songs with singer Joey Bellardini (aka Joey Belladonna later of thrash metal band Anthrax).

In 1985, McDonald joined Savoy Brown. Driscoll found regular work outside of music, which he supplemented with stints as a session musician.

Nearly 40 years later, surviving original member Andrew "Duck" MacDonald released all the final recordings on a CD issued by Louder Than Loud Records.

== Discography ==
- Bible Black - The complete recordings 1981-1983 (Full 'Bible black' album plus the 2 demos) (2022)
