= Trying to Burn the Sun =

Studio album by Elf
- Released: June 1975
- Recorded: January–February 1975
- Studio: Kingsway and AIR Studios, London
- Genre: Blues rock; hard rock; boogie rock
- Length: 36:22
- Label: MGM Records
- Producer: Roger Glover

Elf chronology
| Carolina County Ball (1974) | Trying to Burn the Sun (1975) | The Gargantuan (1978) |

Ronnie James Dio chronology
| Carolina County Ball (1974) | Trying to Burn the Sun (1975) | Ritchie Blackmore's Rainbow (1975) |

Professional ratings
Review scores
| Source | Rating |
|---|---|
| Allmusic | 4/5 stars |

Trying to Burn the Sun is the third and final studio album released by American rock group Elf, released in 1975.

== Track listing ==
All tracks are written by Ronnie James Dio and Micky Lee Soule.

| No. | Title | Length |
|---|---|---|
| 1. | "Black Swampy Water" | 3:43 |
| 2. | "Prentice Wood" | 4:37 |
| 3. | "When She Smiles" | 4:54 |
| 4. | "Good Time Music" | 4:30 |
| 5. | "Liberty Road" | 3:22 |
| 6. | "Shotgun Boogie" | 3:07 |
| 7. | "Wonderworld" | 5:03 |
| 8. | "Streetwalker" | 7:07 |

== Personnel ==
Personnel taken from Trying to Burn the Sun liner notes.

Elf

- Ronnie James Dio – vocals
- Steve Edwards – guitar
- Mickey Lee Soule – keyboards
- Craig Gruber – bass guitar
- Gary Driscoll – drums
- Mark Nauseef – percussion

Additional musicians

- Helen Chappelle, Barry St. John, Liza Strike – backing vocals
- Mountain Fjord Orchestra – strings
- Martin Ford – string arrangements

Production

- Roger Glover – production
- Fin Costello – concept, photography
