= Filet of Soul (disambiguation) =

Filet of Soul may refer to:

- Filet of Soul, an American folk-rock band from Athens and Atlanta, Georgia
- Filet of Soul (Wisconsin band)
- "Filet of Soul", a song by American composer, arranger, and trumpeter Billy May
- Filet of Soul: A "Live" One, an album by rock and roll duo Jan and Dean
- "Filet of Soul", an episode of Dexter's Laboratory

Fillet of Soul may refer to:

- A fictional restaurant chain in the James Bond film Live and let die
