= The Candlemaker =

The Candlemaker may refer to:

- a candlemaker
- The Candlemaker (film), a 1957 animated short film
- Candlemaker (character), a character in DC Comics
