= Craig Gruber =

American bassist (1951–2015)

Background information
- Born: 15 June 1951; Cortland, New York, U.S.
- Died: 5 May 2015 (aged 63) Jacksonville, Florida, U.S.
- Occupation: Bassist
- Years active: 1970s–2015
- Formerly of: Elf, Rainbow, Black Sabbath, Bible Black, Gary Moore, Raven Lord

Craig M. Gruber (June 15, 1951 – May 5, 2015) was an American rock bassist, best known as the original bassist in Rainbow. He also played in Elf, consisting of vocalist Ronnie James Dio, keyboardist Mickey Lee Soule, drummer Gary Driscoll, and guitarist Steve Edwards.

== Biography ==
Elf released three albums before they joined Ritchie Blackmore in his newly formed band Rainbow in mid-1975. Gruber played on Rainbow's first album, Ritchie Blackmore's Rainbow. Soon after the album was released, Blackmore fired everyone except Dio. Gruber was also in the early recording sessions on Black Sabbath's Heaven and Hell album, co-writing "Die Young," until Geezer Butler heard Dio, and returned to the band.

Gruber played live with Gary Moore on his supporting tour for his album Victims of the Future, and featured on Moore's 1984 live album We Want Moore! In 1980 he formed Bible Black with former Elf and Rainbow drummer Gary Driscoll. The band released three albums before Driscoll's murder in 1987. Gruber had also been working on an Elf reunion, even though it seemed unlikely given the deaths of Driscoll and frontman Ronnie James Dio; both of whom had been members of the band from foundation until dissolution.

Early in 2010 Gruber formed "ED3N"- a metal band in the classic rock genre. The band featured Gruber's former Bible Black bandmate and vocalist Jeff Fenholt and guitarist David Shankle, of DSG and formerly Manowar.

== Death ==
Craig Gruber died of prostate cancer in Florida on May 5, 2015, aged 63.

== Discography ==
=== With Elf ===
- Carolina County Ball (1974)
- Trying to Burn the Sun (1975)

=== With Rainbow ===
- Ritchie Blackmore's Rainbow (1975)

=== With Ozz ===
- No Prisoners (1980)

=== With Bible Black ===
- Bible Black (1981)
- Ground Zero (1983)

=== With Gary Moore ===
- We Want Moore! (1984)
- Blinder (Ca. 1984)

=== With The Rods ===
- Heavier Than Thou (1986)
