= Carolina County Ball =

Studio album by Elf
- Released: April 1974 (UK)
- Recorded: January–February 1974
- Studio: The Manor Studio
- Genre: Blues rock; hard rock; boogie rock
- Length: 37:14
- Label: Purple TPS 3506 (UK); MGM
- Producer: Roger Glover

Elf chronology
Elf (1972)	Carolina County Ball (1974)	Trying to Burn the Sun (1975)

Professional ratings
Review scores
Source	Rating
Allmusic link	3/5 stars

Carolina County Ball is the second studio album by the rock band Elf, released as an LP in 1974 on the MGM label. It was released in the United States and Japan as L.A.59. The album is the first to feature Craig Gruber on bass.

== Track listing ==
All tracks are written by Ronnie Dio and Micky Lee Soule.

No.	Title	Length
1.	"Carolina County Ball"	4:46
2.	"L.A. 59"	4:21
3.	"Ain't It All Amusing"	5:01
4.	"Happy"	5:28
5.	"Annie New Orleans"	3:01
6.	"Rocking Chair Rock 'n' Roll Blues"	5:36
7.	"Rainbow"	4:00
8.	"Do the Same Thing"	3:10
9.	"Blanche"	2:31

On some of the European releases of "Carolina County Ball", the first song is listed as "Carolina Country Ball" making this album something of a collector's item.

== Personnel ==
Personnel taken from Carolina County Ball liner notes.

Elf

- Ronnie James Dio – lead vocals
- Steve Edwards – guitar
- Micky Lee Soule – keyboards, backing vocals
- Craig Gruber – bass
- Gary Driscoll – drums, percussion

Additional musicians

- Helen Chappell, Liza Strike, & Barry St. John – backing vocals
- The Manor Chorus – vocals on "Blanche"
- Mountain Fjord, M.D., & Martyn Ford – strings
- Ray Swinfield – clarinet
- Chris Pyne – trombone
- Henry Lowther – trumpet

Production

- Roger Glover – production, string arrangements
- Lou (Conway) Austin, Simon Heyworth – recording engineers
- Colin Hart, Raymond Da'Rio – equipment
- Mixed at Kingsway Recorders
- Fin Costello – photography
