= Snip and Snap =

- Genre: Stop-motion animation
- Written by: John Halas, Elisabeth Beresford and Roger Manvell
- Directed by: Thok Søndergaard (Thoki Yenn)
- Composers: Matyas Seiber, Jack King
- Country of origin: United Kingdom
- No. of seasons: 1
- No. of episodes: 26

Production
- Producer: John Halas
- Animators: Thoki Yenn, Vic Hodges and Johnny Morris
- Editor: Jack King
- Production company: Halas and Batchelor

Original release
- Network: Sveriges Radio TV
- Release: 1960

Snip and Snap is a 1960 British animated series from Halas & Batchelor. It was directed by the Danish paper sculptor Thok Søndergaard (Thoki Yenn) and John Halas. It featured the exploits of a dog (Snap) made of paper and pair of scissors (Snip).
