= Snapshot (Roger Glover album) =

Studio album by Roger Glover and The Guilty Party
- Released: November 5, 2002
- Recorded: 2001–2002
- Genres: Rock, Roots rock, Reggae
- Length: 54:27
- Label: Eagle
- Producers: Peter Denenberg, Roger Glover

Roger Glover and The Guilty Party chronology
Accidentally on Purpose (with Ian Gillan) (1988)	Snapshot (2002)	If Life Was Easy (2011)

Snapshot is the fourth solo album by Deep Purple bassist Roger Glover released in September 2002 by Eagle Records. It features Randall Bramblett, Warren Haynes and Gillian Glover (Roger's daughter). It is credited to Roger Glover & The Guilty Party.

== Track listing ==
- All songs written by Roger Glover and Randall Bramblett, except where noted.
1. "My Turn" (Glover) - Vocals by Randall Bramblett
2. "Burn Me Up Slowly" (Glover) - Vocals by Roger Glover
3. "Beyond Emily" - Vocals by Randall Bramblett
4. "Queen of England" (Bramblett) - Vocals by Randall Bramblett
5. "No Place To Go" (Glover) - Vocals by Randall Bramblett
6. "The Bargain Basement" (Glover) - Vocals by Gillian Glover
7. "What You Don't Say" - Vocals by Randall Bramblett
8. "Nothing Else" (Glover) - Vocals by Randall Bramblett
9. "Could Have Been Me" (Glover) - Vocals by Randall Bramblett
10. "The More I Find" (Glover) - Vocals by Randall Bramblett
11. "When It Comes To You" - Vocals by Randall Bramblett
12. "Some Hope" - Vocals by Randall Bramblett
13. "If I Could Fly" (Glover) - Vocals by Randall Bramblett
14. "It's Only Life" - Vocals by Randall Bramblett

== Personnel ==
- Roger Glover: Bass guitar, Guitar, Vocals and Piano.
- Randall Bramblett: Lead Vocals, Keyboards, Organ Hammond and Saxophone.
- Joe Bonadio: Drums and percussion.
- Nick Moroch: Guitar.
- Eran Tabib: Slide Guitar.
- Joe Mennona: Horns.
- Larry Saltzman: Guitar.
- Warren Haynes: Guitar.
- Gerry Leonard: Guitar.
- Mickey Lee Soule: Piano.
- Gillian Glover: Vocals.
- Vaneese Thomas: Background vocals.
- Deena Miller: Background vocals.

=== Production notes ===
- Engineered by Peter Denenberg
- Mixed by Peter Denenberg and Roger Glover at Acme Studios, Mamaroneck, New York
- Second engineer/programming: Michael Messier, Rory Young
- Assistant engineer: Jim Albert
- Mastered by Ted Jensen at Sterling Sound, New York. Art direction and design: Roger Glover
- Layout: Diane Murphy
- 1950 photograph of Roger Glover: Norman Glover
