= Accidentally on Purpose (Ian Gillan and Roger Glover album) =

Studio album by Ian Gillan and Roger Glover
- Released: 15 February 1988
- Recorded: October 1986; July-September 1987; November 1987 (mixing)
- Studios: AIR Studios, Montserrat, Minot Studio and Power Station, New York City, Sountec Studios, Connecticut
- Genre: Pop rock
- Length: 40:51
- Label: Virgin
- Producers: Roger Glover, Ian Gillan

Ian Gillan chronology
| Accidentally on Purpose (1988) | Naked Thunder (1990) |

Roger Glover chronology
| Mask (1984) | Accidentally on Purpose (1988) | Snapshot (2002) |

Singles from Accidentally on Purpose
- 1. "Dislocated" Released: 16 November 1987; 2. "She Took My Breath Away" Released: 18 January 1988; 3. "I Can't Dance to That" Released: 1988 (EU); 4. "Clouds And Rain" Released: May 1988 (EU)

Professional ratings
Review scores
| Source | Rating |
|---|---|
| AllMusic | 4/5 stars |
| Collector's Guide to Heavy Metal | 7/10 |

Accidentally on Purpose is an album by Deep Purple members Ian Gillan and Roger Glover, released in February 1988 on Virgin Records. The track "Lonely Avenue" appeared on the soundtrack to Rain Man featuring Dustin Hoffman and Tom Cruise. The track "Telephone Box" reached No. 15 on the US Billboard Mainstream Rock Tracks chart.

== Track listing ==
All songs by Ian Gillan and Roger Glover, except where indicated

Side 1

1. "Clouds and Rain" – 4:03
2. "Evil Eye" – 4:12
3. "She Took My Breath Away" – 4:34
4. "Dislocated" – 3:24
5. "Via Miami" – 5:00

Side 2

1. "I Can't Dance to That" – 4:26
2. "Can't Believe You Wanna Leave" (Richard Penniman) – 3:11
3. "Lonely Avenue" (Doc Pomus) – 3:08
4. "Telephone Box" – 5:18
5. "I Thought No" – 3:34

CD edition bonus tracks

1. "Cayman Island" – 3:56
2. "The Purple People Eater" (Sheb Wooley) – 2:36
3. "Chet" – 4:17

== Personnel ==
- Ian Gillan – lead vocals, harmonica
- Roger Glover – bass, keyboards, guitars, programming

Additional musicians

- Ira Siegel, Nick Maroch – guitars
- Lloyd Landesman – keyboards
- Dr. John – piano
- Andy Newmark – drums
- George Young, Joe Mennonna – saxophones
- Randy Brecker – flugelhorn
- Vaneese Thomas, Christine Faith, Lydia Mann, Bette Sussmann – Background vocals

Production

- Nick Blagona – engineer
- Frank Oglethorpe, Carl Lever, Ken Blair – assistant engineers (AIR Studios)
- Bruce Robbins – assistant engineer (Minot Studio)
- Dave O'Donnell – assistant engineer (Power Station)
- Peter Hodgson – assistant engineer (Sountec Studio)
- Greg Calbi – mastering at Sterling Sound, New York

== Singles ==
- "Dislocated" / "Chet" (UK/EU, Nov 1987)
- "Dislocated" / "Chet" / "Purple People Eater" (UK, Nov 1987)
- "She Took My Breath Away" / "Cayman Island" (UK/EU, Jan 1988)
- "I Can't Dance to That" / "Purple People Eater" (EU, 1988)
- "Clouds And Rain" / "I Thought No" (EU, May 1988)

== Chart performance ==
| Chart (1988) | Peak position |
|---|---|
| Swedish Albums Chart | 25 |
