= Rick Fowler =

Rick Fowler is an American blues-rock guitarist originally from Bowdon, Georgia. He learned to play guitar primarily by listening to early British blues and rock guitarists and American blues players.

== Career ==
Fowler's earlier bands included Ziggurat, Deacon Little, and Fortnox. Fowler also recorded with pop singer Bertie Higgins, whose hit single "Key Largo" reached platinum sales in several countries. In 1982, the Fortnox song "Storm Inside My Head" went to number 44 in US AOR airplay and the band’s video reached the top 20 on MTV. The band toured non-stop for a year in support of the record, headlining medium venues and performing in stadiums as the supporting act for top rock acts. However, their success was short-lived. In 1984, Fowler's band Bombay recorded an album with British producer Eddy Offord. The record was supported by the MTV video "Rumble Tonight".

He moved to Athens, Georgia, in 1991 after months of touring overseas with the band, Bad Fun. He began performing with a number of Athens-based artists, including Ralph Roddenberry, Redneck Greece, and The Lonely White Boys (a band he formed with Drivin' N' Cryin guitarist Buren Fowler, Dreams So Real drummer Drew Worsham, and Normaltown Flyers bassist Greg Veale). Fowler played guitar in side band projects with Bill Berry (R.E.M.), Dave Schools (Widespread Panic, Government Mule), Randall Bramblett (Traffic), and a number of other well-known musicians from the area.

In 1997, he organized a band to perform a rock concert benefit for Tourette syndrome awareness. Bill Berry, who was at the time retiring from R.E.M., made the show his farewell retirement performance, allowing his drums to be auctioned off for charity at the end of the night. Welcome Companions, a CD recorded by the benefit concert band, was released by Polyglot Records under the band name Rick Fowler and Friends in mid-2000. Other accomplishments include playing as a studio guitarist on over 100 CD releases and producing and performing the music for a Sundance Film Festival award-winning documentary movie entitled Dirty Work. Fowler signed with Jammates Records in 2007 and recorded the CD Back On My Good Foot. The album was released in early 2008.

Fowler formed The Rick Fowler Band after the release of the Back On My Good Foot album. The band signed with Strolling Bones Records in 2025, and the label re-released the album in July of 2026.
