= The Count of Monte Cristo (1973 TV series) =

The Count of Monte Cristo is a 1973 British-Italian animated television series directed by Maurice Brown, based on Alexandre Dumas's 1844 novel of the same name.

== Production details ==
The series was produced in the UK by British animation studio Halas and Batchelor Cartoon Films. It was co-produced with Italian company RAI, and ITC. Giulio Cesare Pirarba voiced the Count in the Italian version. The English dub featured George Roubicek, Jeremy Wilkin, Bernard Spear, Peter Hawkins, Miriam Margolyes, Jean England and David de Keyser. 17 episodes were produced, but have never been broadcast since the early 1990s, with only a handful of episodes having surfaced afterwards. The last six episodes are available on YouTube. These were videotaped off RTE , The Irish television service in 1991.

== Episodes ==
- A Diabolical Deception
- The Crazy Marquis
- The Curse of Magdapur
- The Castle of Inventions
- The Besieged Island
- Hunt for Heredity
- An Infamous Slander
- The Cave of Slaves
- The Legend of Hernandez
- The Defeat of Dumklot
- The Dynamite
- A Great Fraudster
- The Black Orchid
- Rogue’s Gallery
- Music Hath Charms
- Search for Power
- Destroy the Tower
