= Joy Batchelor =

English animator, director, screenwriter, and producer (1914–1991)

- Born: 12 May 1914; Watford, Hertfordshire, England
- Died: 14 May 1991 (aged 77); London, England
- Occupation: Animator
- Years active: 1937–1991
- Spouse: John Halas (m. 1940)
- Website: halasandbatchelor.co.uk

Joy Ethel Batchelor (12 May 1914 – 14 May 1991) was an English animator, director, screenwriter, and producer. She married John Halas in 1940 and subsequently co-established Halas and Batchelor cartoons, whose best known production is the animated feature film Animal Farm (1954), which made her the first woman director of an animated feature since Lotte Reiniger. Together they created over 2000 shorts/films, and produced roughly 70 propaganda pieces during World War II for the British government. She helped co-write, write, animate, produce, and direct many of their productions.

One of Batchelor's projects as an art director was Cinerama Holiday (1955). She directed and wrote Ruddigore (1967), a television-film adaptation of W.S. Gilbert's opera of the same name, which became the first opera to be adapted into an animated film. She later worked in television, directing series, including animated shows like The Jackson 5ive (1971). She died on 14 May 1991, just two days after her 77th birthday.

== Early life ==
Joy Batchelor was born 12 May 1914, in Watford, Hertfordshire. She attended Watford Grammar School for Girls and later attended Watford School of Art, Science and Commerce, to which she had won a scholarship. She was offered placement afterwards at the Slade School of Art, but did not continue schooling to help support her family financially. She worked as a commercial artist and assembly line worker.

Batchelor was born into a family that had hoped for a son, leading to a sense of disappointment from her parents. She grew up feeling overshadowed by her younger brother, John, who received their mother’s devoted attention. In 1921, John died of diphtheria at the age of four, shortly after the birth of their sister, Barbara. The loss deeply affected the family, and their mother, Ethel Amy Herbert, suffered a nervous breakdown, requiring hospitalization. As a result, Batchelor experienced feelings of guilt and neglect during her early years.

Ethel, who had been raised with strict Victorian values, imposed rigid discipline on her children. On one occasion, she punished her by locking her in the cupboard beneath the stairs, an experience that strengthened her resolve to escape her circumstances. She would narrate stories to herself as a form of solace and imagination.

From an early age, Batchelor showed a strong interest in drawing. Her father encouraged her artistic talent, bringing home long paper off-cuts for her to use. Ethel, who harbored her own unfulfilled ambitions, pushed both Joy and Barbara to excel academically, warning them that without scholarships, they would end up in the workhouse. She earned a scholarship to grammar school and later received another to attend the Watford School of Art. She was also offered a scholarship to the prestigious Slade School of Fine Art but declined due to financial constraints, opting instead to enter the workforce to support her family.

Determined to pursue a career in art without becoming a teacher, Batchelor initially worked painting knick-knacks and trinkets on an assembly line, but she was dismissed after openly criticizing the poor working conditions.

== Career ==
Batchelor first began working in animation as an in-betweener for Dennis Connolly's projects. As part of her job as a commercial artist, she worked as a silk-screen printer and printed posters, as well as assisting in design work for fashion magazines. She met John Halas after he advertised for an assistant animator for British Colour Cartoons Limited. Batchelor accompanied him when the company sent Halas to Hungary in 1937 for work. Their first film together would be The Music Man (1937).

Batchelor and Halas attempted to start a commercial art studio in Budapest, which was unsuccessful. British Colour Cartoons experienced financial problems and, with war looming, Batchelor and Halas moved back to London after six months, where Batchelor resumed work as a freelance illustrator for books and magazines. The couple married 27 April 1940. Later that year, they established Halas and Batchelor Cartoons.

=== Halas and Batchelor ===
1948 Charley film, Your Very Good Health.

During the first year of Halas and Batchelor, Batchelor and Halas continued to do commercial work to bolster their finances. In 1940, Halas and Batchelor was approached by J. Walter Thompson to produce advertising shorts. The company's first commissions consisted of commercials for Kellogg's cereal and Lux Soap, creating Train Trouble and Carnival in a Clothes Cupboard respectively.

Later in 1940, Halas and Batchelor was taken over by the Ministry of Information, and used to create propaganda and educational films for the war effort. Batchelor helped to co-write, co-direct, and animate most of the films produced during that time. The output included films such as Dustbin Parade (1941) and Filling the Gap (1941). Between 1940 and 1944, the company was kept busy, producing roughly 70 films. Because Halas was a Hungarian immigrant, Batchelor helped inform the films with her knowledge of the British way of life.

After World War II, Halas and Batchelor continued to produce shorts for the government. Batchelor designed Charley, the titular character of the Charley series the company created for the Central Office of Information. The series was designed to educate and persuade the audience in regard to the socialist-slanted policies of the newly installed Labour Government. Batchelor's style was described as favouring the use of simplistic images and authoritative narration, which was characteristic of the Charley series. The first film she wrote for the Ministry of Health, was Modern Guide to Health (1946). The company's films were also part of the effort by the Economic Cooperation Administration to promote the Marshall Plan. To that end, Lothar Wolff, in charge of commissioning films for the ECA, asked Halas and Batchelor to animate The Shoemaker and the Hatter (1949). Wolff later introduced their films to Louis de Rochemont, who worked with them to create Animal Farm.

=== Animal Farm ===
Batchelor and John Halas shared in directing Animal Farm (1954). She worked on the preliminary treatments for the film, which were used to get the rights to create it. She had a leading role in writing the script and designing the characters.

To simplify and shorten the complex story of Animal Farm, she devised a breakdown chart and a tension chart. The breakdown chart was used to connect all the characters in Animal Farm to each other, as well as gauge their contribution to major plot points. The tension chart was described as a long sheet of paper outlining the rise and fall of emotional tension in relation to the plot points as the story unfolded. It consisted of a short description of the scene along the top, followed by a visual depiction of how tension would build. It also included cues for the changes in intensity for the music. The charts helped to decide which characters (for example, Clover and Mollie) could be dropped from the film, and which scenes could be shortened while still retaining the story and message of Animal Farm. Despite that, the film ran over the initially agreed length, as well as taking three years to complete. Animal Farm was Britain's first animated feature film.

=== After Animal Farm ===
In 1955, commercial television became increasingly popular, so the bulk of Halas and Batchelor's output was televised shorts. That included DoDo - The Kid From Outer Space (1964) and Foo Foo (1959 to 1960). Batchelor wrote the bulk of the scripts.

The studio's short, Automania 2000 (1963), for which Batchelor wrote the script, won the British Academy of Film and Television Arts award in 1964, and was nominated for an Oscar.

Halas and Batchelor produced only one more animated feature film after Animal Farm, an adaptation of the Gilbert and Sullivan comic operetta, Ruddigore, written and directed by Batchelor herself. The 1966 film was the first animated adaptation of an opera. In creating the adaptation, Batchelor had to conform to a strict condition that no songs or dialogue could be altered, which was challenging when trying to shorten the film to feature-length. As the story was told through song in the original operetta, Batchelor employed voice-over narration to help convey and clarify the story. The film received mixed reviews upon its release.

Halas and Batchelor also animated the music video for the song "Love Is All" by Roger Glover (1975).

== Retirement and death ==
Batchelor had to retire in the mid 1970s due to arthritis, and could no longer work. She taught well past retirement at the London Film School. She died 14 May 1991 in London from an unnamed illness, two days after her 77th birthday.

She is survived by her daughter Vivien Halas, who currently manages the Halas & Batchelor collection.

== Partial filmography ==
=== Before Halas and Batchelor ===
| Title | Year | Role |
|---|---|---|
| Happy Safari | 1933 | Animator |
| The Lion and the Mouse | 1934 | Animator |
| Robin Hood | 1935 | Animator |
| Noah's Ark | 1937 | Animator |
| Music Man | 1938 | Animator |

=== With Halas and Batchelor ===
| Title | Year | Type | Role |
|---|---|---|---|
| Carnival in a Clothes Cupboard | 1940 | Advertisement | Director, possibly other roles |
| Train Trouble | 1940 | Advertisement | Director, possibly other roles |
| Dustbin Parade | 1941 | Short | Director, animator |
| Filling the Gap | 1941 | Short | |
| Modern Guide to Health | 1946 | Short | Screenwriter |
| Magic Canvas | 1948 | Short | Producer |
| Charley series | 1948–49 | Series | Director, producer, character designer, screenwriter |
| Fly About the House | 1949 | Short | Director, producer, design |
| The Shoemaker and the Hatter | 1949 | Short | Screenwriter |
| The Figurehead | 1953 | Short | Director, producer, screenwriter, design |
| Animal Farm | 1954 | Feature film | Director, producer, character designer, screenwriter |
| Cinerama Holiday | 1955 | Feature film | Art director |
| The Adventures of Popeye | 1956-68 | Series | Director, producer, screenwriter |
| Foo Foo | 1959–60 | Series | Director, producer, screenwriter |
| The Monster of Highgate Ponds | 1960 | Short | Screenwriter |
| Automania 2000 | 1963 | Short | Screenwriter, producer, storyboard artist |
| Do Do - The Kid from Outer Space | 1964 | Series | Director, producer, screenwriter |
| Ruddigore | 1967 | Feature film | Director, screenwriter |
| Colombo Plan | 1967 | Short | Director |
| The Five | 1970 | Short | Director, producer |
| The Revolution of Pets | 1972 | Feature film | Director, producer, character designer, screenwriter |
| Contact | 1973 | Short | Director |
| Bee Tales | 1982 | Feature film | Director, producer, character design |

== See also ==
- List of female film and television directors
- Women's cinema
