= Elements (Roger Glover album) =

Studio album by Roger Glover
- Released: April 1978
- Recorded: 1977
- Studio: Musicland, Munich, Germany
- Genre: Pop rock; psychedelic rock; hard rock
- Length: 35:20
- Label: PolyGram
- Producer: Roger Glover, Martin Birch

Roger Glover chronology
The Butterfly Ball and the Grasshopper's Feast (1974)	Elements (1978)	Mask (1984)

Professional ratings
Review scores
Source	Rating
Allmusic	4/5 stars

Elements is the second solo album from Deep Purple bassist Roger Glover. It was recorded in early 1977 but wasn't released until April 1978 on PolyGram Records. The album's main concept is based on the four elements.

== Track listing ==
1. "The First Ring Made of Clay" (Roger Glover) 7:45
2. "The Next a Ring of Fire" (Glover) 9:45
3. "The Third Ring's Watery Flow" (Glover) 9:00
4. "The Fourth Ring with the Wind" (Glover, Martin Birch) 6:33
5. "Finale" (Glover, Birch) 2:17

== Personnel ==
- Roger Glover: ARP 2600 Synthesizer, Oberheim polyphonic synthesizer, bass guitar, percussion, tabla, sitar guitar, acoustic guitar, vibes, backing vocals
- Simon Phillips: drums, tabla, percussion
- Micky Lee Soule: Piano, organ, percussion
- Graham Preskett: Electric violin, clarinet
- Ronnie Aspery: Saxophone, flute
- Martin Birch: Acoustic guitar, backing vocals
- Liza Strike: Lead Vocals
- Helen Chappelle: Lead Vocals
- The Munich Philharmonic conducted by Graham Preskett

== Production notes ==
- Produced by Martin Birch and Roger Glover
- Recorded and mixed at Musicland Studios, Munich, Germany, 1977
- Engineered by Martin Birch assisted by Hans Menzel
- Mastered at Sterling Sound, New York by Greg Calbi
