= Randall Bramblett =

American musician and singer-songwriter (born 1948)

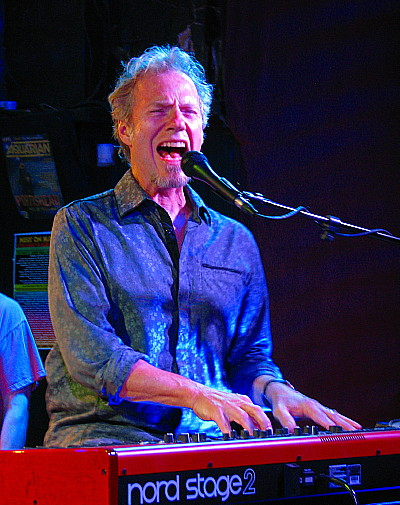
- Bramblett performing in 2013

Background information
- Born: 1948 (age 77–78)
- Origin: Jesup, Georgia, United States
- Genres: Folk; acoustic; rock; adult alternative
- Occupations: Singer; musician; songwriter
- Instruments: Vocals; keyboards; saxophone
- Member of: Roger Glover and The Guilty Party
- Formerly of: Traffic; Sea Level
- Website: randallbramblett.com

Randall Bramblett (born 1948) is an American musician and singer-songwriter, whose career as a solo artist, session player, and touring musician, has spanned five decades. He has worked with Gregg Allman, Bonnie Raitt, Goose Creek Symphony, Robbie Robertson, Elvin Bishop, Steve Winwood, Bonnie Bramlett, B.J. Thomas, Widespread Panic, Jay E. Livingston and Roger Glover. He plays keyboards, saxophones, flute, guitar, mandolin, and harmonica, and his songwriting is influenced by blues, folk, and gospel music.

== Life and career ==
Born in Jesup, Georgia, United States, Bramblett studied religion and psychology at the University of North Carolina, with the objective of entering the seminary. However, finding inspiration in the music of James Taylor, Carole King, and Bob Dylan, he abandoned his theological studies and pursued songwriting, soon moving to Athens, Georgia.

After establishing himself as a session musician in the early 1970s, recording with artists like Gregg Allman and Elvin Bishop, Bramblett toured with bands such as the Gregg Allman Band, Sea Level, Widespread Panic, and Traffic. Bramblett, along with Chuck Leavell, has been credited with giving Sea Level, described as "a jazz-influenced spinoff from the Allman Brothers Band," a new, unique direction. Bramblett has been described as an outstanding lyricist and vocalist. The songs he wrote during his time with Sea Level have been described as "philosophical, despairing soul and funk tunes and rockers."

As of 2017, Bramblett has recorded a total of fourteen albums, with the first two, That Other Mile and Light of the Night, issued by Polydor in the 1975 and 1976, and multiple albums in each succeeding decade. Bramblett's 2001 album, No More Mr. Lucky, features Bramblett playing the Hammond B-3 and saxes. Tracks on that album has been described as rich, funky, hip, and raw.

In 2015, Bramblett released Devil Music. The title track was inspired by the story of Howlin' Wolf trying to reunite with his estranged mother, who had abandoned him for "playing the devil's music."

== Discography ==
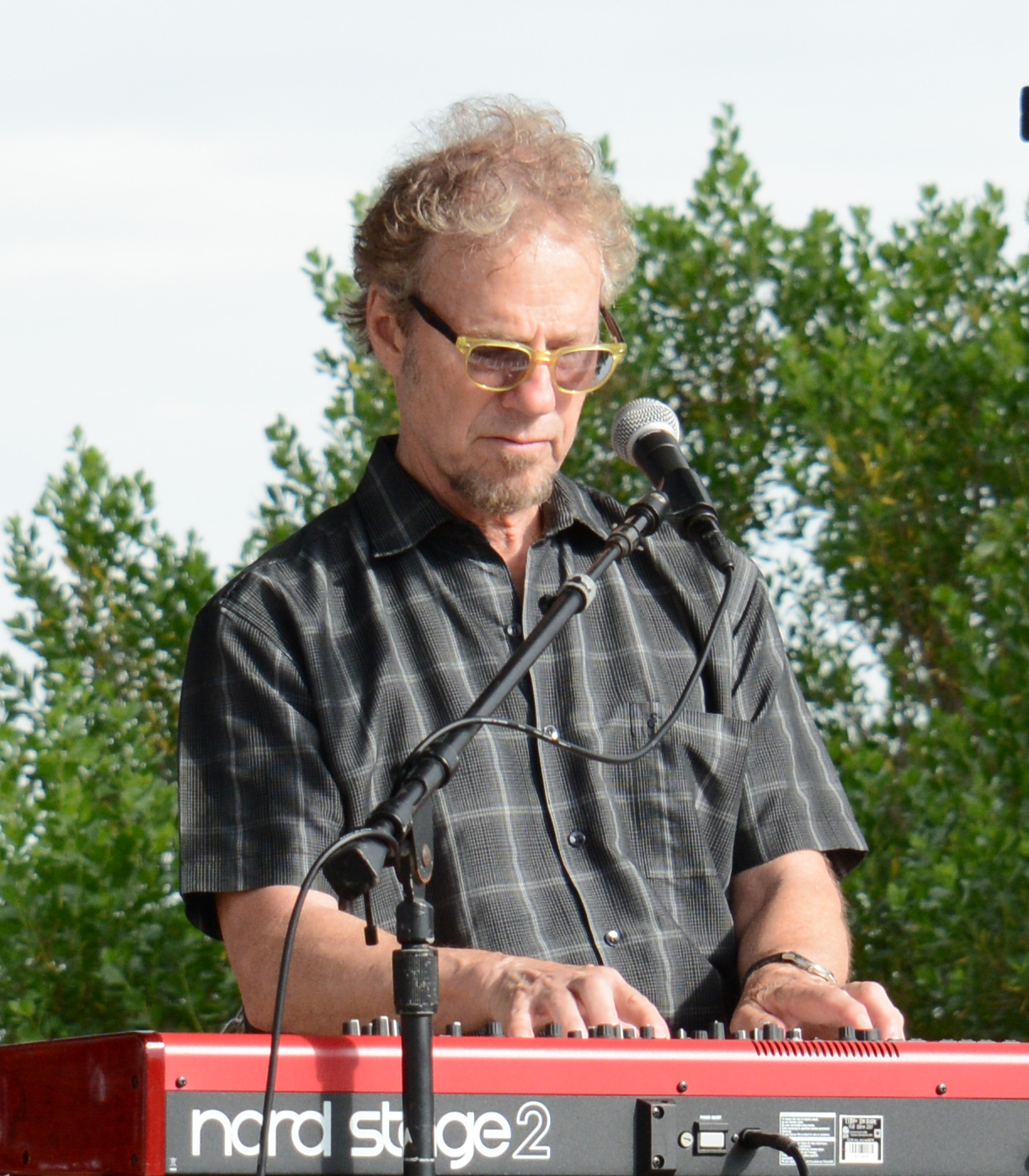
Bramblett performing in 2015

=== Randall Bramblett/The Randall Bramblett Band ===
Album title	Release date	Label	Format(s)
That Other Mile	1975	Polydor	LP
Light of the Night	1976	Polydor	LP
Live at the i&i	1982	Catmando Productions	LP
Visionary School	1997		Compact cassette
See Through Me	1998	Capricorn	CD
No More Mr. Lucky	2001	New West	CD, digital download
Thin Places	2004	New West	CD, digital download
Rich Someday	2006	New West	CD, digital download
Now It's Tomorrow	2008	New West	CD, digital download
The Meantime	2010	Blue Ceiling	CD, digital download
Randall Bramblett & Geoff Achison Jammin' In The Attic	2010	Hittin' The Note Records	CD, digital download
The Bright Spots	2013	New West	CD, digital download
Devil Music	2015	New West	CD, vinyl, digital download
Juke Joint at the Edge of the World	2017	New West	CD, vinyl, digital download
Pine Needle Fire	2020	New West	CD, vinyl, digital download

=== Guest appearances ===
Artist	Album	Year	Label	Performances	Other contributions
Tommy Talton	Somewhere South of Eden	2017	Tommy Talton Music	Tenor Sax	
Allman and Woman	Two The Hard Way	1977	Capricorn	sax	
The Allman Brothers Band	All Live	1998	PolyGram	sax	
Gregg Allman	Laid Back	1973	Capricorn	sax	
Gregg Allman	The Gregg Allman Tour	1974	PolyGram	organ, horn, sax	horn arrangements
Atlanta Rhythm Section	Back Up Against The Wall	1973	Decca Records	piano	
Elvin Bishop	Let It Flow	1974	Capricorn	sax	
Elvin Bishop	Sure Feels Good: The Best of Elvin Bishop	1992	Polydor	sax	
Bonnie Bramlett	It's Time	1975	Capricorn	sax	
Bonnie Bramlett	Lady's Choice	1976	Capricorn	sax	
Bonnie Bramlett	Beautiful	2008	Rockin' Camel	sax, keys, vocals	
Cowboy	Boyer and Talton	1973	Capricorn	sax, vocals	
Cowboy	Cowboy	1977	Capricorn	sax, vocals	
Cowboy	A Different Time: The Best of Cowboy	1993	Polydor	sax	
Deep Purple and Friends	Purple and Other Colors	2003	Snapper Music	vocals	
Doubting Thomas	Who Died and Made You King?	1998	Oh Very	sax	
Enlightenment Road Band	Songs From the Road to Enlightenment	2001	Five Feathers	piano, organ, sax, vocals	
Filet of Soul	Incommunicado	1998	Shank	sax	
Rick Fowler	Back on My Good Foot	2008	Jammates	organ	
Roger Glover	Snapshot	2002	Red Ink	piano, keys, organ, sax, vocals	
Gov't Mule	Live...With a Little Help from Our Friends	1999	Volcano 3	soprano, tenor sax	
Gov't Mule	The Deep End, vol. 1	2001	ATO	organ	
John Hammond, Jr.	Can't Beat The Kid	1975	Capricorn	piano, keys	
Hydra	Hydra	1974	Capricorn	sax	
Johnny Jenkins	Blessed Blues	1996	Capricorn	organ, sax	
Johnny Jenkins	Handle With Care	2001	Orchard	keys	
Johnny Jenkins	All in Good Time	2005	Mean Old World	organ, keys, sax, vocals	
Jerry Joseph and the Jackmormons	Conscious Contact	2001	Terminus	organ, keys, Wurlitzer, vocals	
Jan Krist	Curious	1996	Silent Planet	piano, keys, sax	
Chuck Leavell	Southscape	2005	Megaforce	recorder, sax	
Lingo	Through The Scattered Trees	2008		organ, sax	
Francine Reed	Can't Make It on My Own	1996	Ichiban	sax	
Robbie Robertson	Carny (soundtrack)	1980	Warner Bros	sax	
B. J. Thomas	Longhorns & Londonbridges	1974	Paramount Records	piano, keys, vocals	several Randall Bramblett compositions on album
Traffic	Traffic Live (DVD)	1994	Rhino	woodwinds, keys	
Traffic	The Last Great Traffic Jam	2005	Legacy Recordings	woodwinds, keys	
various artists	Woodstock '94 (DVD)	1994	A&M Records	woodwinds, keys	
Vigilantes of Love	Live at the 40 Watt	1998	Paste	Hammond synth	
Vigilantes of Love	Summershine	2001	Compass Records	organ, piano, keys, mellotron, Chamberlain	
Widespread Panic	Live in the Classic City	2002	Sanctuary Records	Sax	
Widespread Panic	Jackassolantern	2004	Sanctuary	Sax	
Widespread Panic	Live From the Backyard	2003	Sanctuary	Alto and Soprano Sax, Guitar	
Steve Winwood	Refugees of the Heart	1990	Virgin Records	Alto and Soprano Sax	
Sea Level	Cats on the Coast	1977	Capricorn	Organ, Alto and Soprano Sax, Vocals, Percussion	
Sea Level	On the Edge	1978	Capricorn	Alto and Soprano Sax, Vocals, Electric Piano	
Sea Level	Long Walk on a Short Pier	1979	Capricorn	Alto and Soprano Sax, Vocals, Keyboards	
Sea Level	Ball Room	1980	BMG	Alto and Soprano Sax, Vocals, Keyboards	
Sea Level	Best of Sea Level	1990	Island/Mercury	Alto and Soprano Sax, Vocals, Keyboards, Percussion	
