= Joe Mennonna =

British musician

Joe Mennonna is a British accomplished session musician, who worked with Ian Gillan and Roger Glover on their 1988 album Accidentally on Purpose, and toured with Ian Gillan in September 2006 in support of the Gillan's Inn album. He also appears on Gillan's Live in Anaheim.

Mennonna toured with The Bacon Brothers Band playing a Hammond B3 with a 122 Leslie, a Roland Rd-700GX, and a tenor saxophone.

== Discography ==
- 1988 Accidentally on Purpose (Ian Gillan & Roger Glover)
- 2006 Gillan's Inn (Ian Gillan)
- 2008 Live in Anaheim [CD/DVD] (Ian Gillan)
- 2011 If Life Was Easy (Roger Glover)
