= Mask (Roger Glover album) =

Studio album by Roger Glover
- Released: 22 June 1984
- Recorded: BearTracks Studios, Suffern, New York, Boogie Hotel Studios, Port Jefferson, New York, Le Studio, Morin-Heights, Quebec, 1983
- Genre: Pop-rock, new wave
- Length: 40:49
- Label: 21 Records, Polydor
- Producer: Roger Glover

Roger Glover chronology
Elements (1978)	Mask (1984)	Accidentally on Purpose (with Ian Gillan) (1988)

Professional ratings
Review scores
Source	Rating
AllMusic	2/5 stars
The Encyclopedia of Popular Music	2/5 stars
MusicHound Rock: The Essential Album Guide	2/5 stars

Mask is a solo album by the Deep Purple bass guitarist Roger Glover. It was released in June 1984, in Europe by 21 Records/Polydor. It was promoted with two music videos. It has been reissued on CD twice in the UK, in 1993 (Connoisseur Collection, b/w "Elements") and in 2005 (Cherry Red/Lemon). Neither has bonus material.

== Track listing ==
All songs written by Roger Glover, except where noted.

One Side

1. "Divided World" - 5:12
2. "Getting Stranger" - 4:07
3. "The Mask" (Roger Glover, Jean Roussel) - 7:32
4. "Fake It" - 4:42

Another Side

1. "Dancin' Again" (Roger Glover, Dave Gellis) - 3:30
2. "(You're) So Remote" - 4:46
3. "Hip Level" (Roger Glover, Chuck Burgi, Dave Gellis) - 7:19
4. "Don't Look Down" - 3:41

Audio cassette bonus track

1. "Unnatural" - originally as track no. 4 on side B

== Personnel ==
=== Musicians ===
- Roger Glover — lead vocals, bass (all tracks); percussion (tracks 3–5, 7), synthesizer (tracks 4, 6, 7), Ovation acoustic guitar (track 2), timbales (track 4), piano (track 5)
- Craig Brooks — backing vocals (tracks 1, 3–5, 7, 8)
- Kate McGarrigle — backing vocals (track 6)
- Denise Brooks — backing vocals (track 8)
- Kim Romano — backing vocals (track 8)
- Charlie DeChant — saxophone (tracks 5–7)
- Dave Gellis — guitar (all tracks)
- Joe Jammer — guitar (tracks 2, 3, 8)
- David Rosenthal — keyboards (track 1–3, 6, 8)
- Jean Roussel — synthesizer (tracks 2, 3, 8)
- Chuck Burgi — drums (all tracks)
- Mark Conese — electronic drums (track 3)
- Nick Blagona — percussion, dub (track 6)

=== Production notes ===
- Engineered by Nick Blagona
- Additional engineering by Jeffrey Kawalek and Mike Barry
- Mixed by Roger Glover and Nick Blagona
- Mastered at Sterling Sound by Greg Calbi

== Singles ==
1. "The Mask" / "Don't Look Down" US #102, Rock Tracks #20
2. "The Mask" (12" Remix) / "Fake It"
3. "The Mask" / "You're So Remote"
4. "Divided World" / "Dancin' Again"
