= Mickey Lee Soule =

American musician (born 1946)

- Also known as: Michael William Soule
- Born: June 6, 1946 (age 79); Cortland, New York, U.S.
- Instruments: Keyboards; guitar; vocals

Mickey Lee Soule (June 6, 1946) is an American musician. He was the keyboard player for New York hard rock band Elf and a founding member of Rainbow.

== Career ==
Soule had a band in the mid-1960s until he was drafted into the army. After his honorable discharge he joined The Elves after the band's original keyboardist, Doug Thaler, was severely injured in a car accident that killed guitarist Nick Pantas. In the first years of the 1970s, The Elves (after 1972 known simply as Elf) enjoyed minor success as a consistent opening act for Deep Purple. That connection to Deep Purple opened up the opportunity for Soule (and vocalist Ronnie James Dio) to participate in Roger Glover's 1974 concept album The Butterfly Ball and the Grasshopper's Feast. In addition to co-writing credits on two songs, Soule also sang the lead vocals on the song "No Solution". Soule and Glover would work together sporadically in the years following.

In early 1975, Soule and the rest of Elf (minus guitarist Steve Edwards) transformed into Rainbow, featuring Deep Purple guitarist Ritchie Blackmore. During this time the third and final Elf album, Trying to Burn the Sun, was recorded when the former Elf were not in the studio recording Rainbow's debut album. Elf had effectively dissolved by the time that album was released as the members hoped to continue with Blackmore. However, following the recording of the Rainbow album, Blackmore gradually fired the entire line up with the exception of Dio before Rainbow had begun to tour.

In 1976 Soule toured France with the Ian Gillan Band.

Soule continues to play locally in New York. In 1996, Mickey Lee Soule started working as a keyboard tech for Deep Purple's Jon Lord, later he became bass tech for Roger Glover until he retired from touring in 2014. He began working for Roger Glover and Deep Purple again in 2016.

== Discography ==
With Elf

- 1972 - Elf
- 1974 - Carolina County Ball
- 1975 - Trying to Burn the Sun

With Ritchie Blackmore's Rainbow

- 1975 - Ritchie Blackmore's Rainbow

With Ian Gillan Band

- 2003 - Rarities 1975-1977

Steaming Pile Of Mick

- 2013 - Pet Wounds

Solo Career

- 2016 - Handsome Boy (feat. Beverly Stearns) - Single
- 2019 - I'm Alright Now - Single

Other

- 1974 - Roger Glover - The Butterfly Ball and the Grasshopper's Feast
- 1978 - Roger Glover - Elements
- 1982 - Eddie Hardin - Circumstantial Evidence
- 1990 - A'LA Rock - Indulge
- 2000 - Deep Purple - In Concert with The London Symphony Orchestra
- 2002 - Roger Glover - Snapshot
- 2006 - Ian Gillan - Gillan's Inn
- 2011 - Roger Glover - If Life Was Easy
