= Elf (band) =

American rock band (1967–1975)

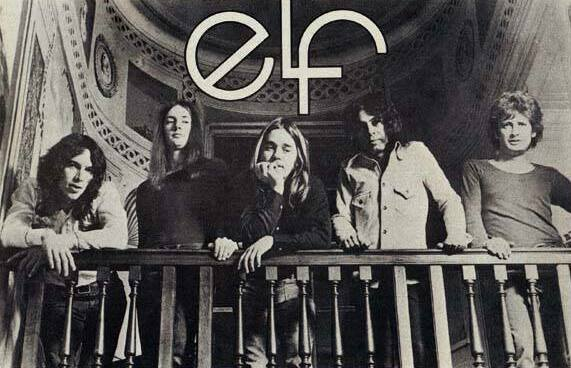
- Elf in 1974 (logo above). L-R: Steve Edwards, Craig Gruber, Gary Driscoll, Ronnie James Dio, and Micky Lee Soule.

Background information
- Also known as: The Electric Elves; The Elves
- Origin: Cortland, New York, U.S.
- Genres: Blues rock; hard rock; boogie rock
- Years active: 1967–1975
- Labels: Epic, MGM, Purple, Safari
- Spinoffs: Rainbow
- Past members: Ronnie James Dio; Gary Driscoll; David Feinstein; Doug Thaler; Nick Pantas; Micky Lee Soule; Craig Gruber; Steve Edwards; Mark Nauseef

Elf was an American rock band founded in 1967 by singer and bassist Ronnie James Dio, keyboardist Doug Thaler, drummer Gary Driscoll, and guitarists Nick Pantas and David Feinstein (Dio's cousin). The band was originally called the Electric Elves, but was shortened to the Elves in 1968 and finally Elf in 1972. Elf disbanded in 1975 after recording three albums and after most of the lineup had been absorbed into the newly formed group Rainbow.

== History ==
The band was formed in 1967 when the members of Ronnie Dio and the Prophets transformed themselves into the Electric Elves and added a keyboard player, Doug Thaler.

In February 1968, the band was involved in an automobile accident in which guitarist Nick Pantas was killed. The accident forced a shuffling of the band member roles as original keyboardist Thaler moved to guitar (after recovering from his injuries) and the group hired Mickey Lee Soule to take over keyboard duties. Upon leaving the group in 1972, Thaler moved to New York and got a job as a booking agent — Elf was one of the bands he booked.

Elf's self-titled debut album was produced by Deep Purple members Roger Glover and Ian Paice, who happened to see Elf auditioning in 1972. For the next few years, the band enjoyed mild success as an opening act for Deep Purple.

Dio both sang and played the bass guitar until, following the release of Elf's first album, Craig Gruber was asked to join as bass guitarist. In August 1973 Feinstein quit the band and was replaced by Steve Edwards. In 1974, Elf released its second album, Carolina County Ball. That same year Dio was asked by Glover to sing on his solo album, The Butterfly Ball and the Grasshopper's Feast. Dio's voice gained the attention of Deep Purple guitarist Ritchie Blackmore, who was beginning to tire of Deep Purple and was looking for musicians to record a solo album. Asides guitarist Steve Edwards and drummer Mark Nauseef, he decided in early 1975 to use the musicians in Elf for this album, and the band Rainbow was soon formed. Though Elf had been writing and recording its third album, Trying to Burn the Sun at the same time, following the completion of that album and the Rainbow album, Elf disbanded. Trying to Burn the Sun was eventually released in the U.S. in June 1975.

In 1980, Feinstein formed the heavy metal power trio the Rods.

Beginning in the late 1980s, some of the former members of Elf speculated about a potential reunion of the band, however nothing formal ever took place. Three of the band's members have also died: Driscoll in 1987, Dio in 2010, and Gruber in 2015.

== Personnel ==
- Ronnie James Dio – lead vocals (1967–1975; died 2010), bass (1967–1973)
- Gary Driscoll – drums, percussion (1967–1975; died 1987)
- David Feinstein – lead guitar (1967–1973)
- Doug Thaler – keyboards (1967–1972), rhythm guitar (1968–1972)
- Nick Pantas – rhythm guitar (1967–1968; his death)
- Micky Lee Soule – keyboards, backing vocals (1968–1975)
- Craig Gruber – bass (1973–1975; died 2015)
- Steve Edwards – guitar (1973–1975)
- Mark Nauseef – percussion (1975)

Timeline

== Discography ==
=== Singles ===
- "Hey, Look Me Over" / "It Pays to Advertise" (1967) – as the Electric Elves
- "Walking in Different Circles" / "She's Not the Same" (1969) – as the Elves
- "Amber Velvet" / "West Virginia" (1970) – as the Elves

=== Studio albums ===
- Elf (1972)
- Carolina County Ball (1974)
- Trying to Burn the Sun (1975)

=== Compilations and bootleg recordings ===
- Live at the Beacon (1971) – as the Elves (bootleg)
- Live at the Bank (1972) – as the Elves (bootleg)
- Live! And My Soul Shall Be Lifted (1973) (bootleg)
- The Gargantuan Elf Album (1978) compilation of 1974 and 1975 albums
- Ronnie James Dio: The Elf Albums (1991) compiles 1974 and 1975 albums
- And Before Elf... There Were Elves (2011) – as the Elves features 12 songs from 'Live at the Bank' bootleg.
