= Gary Driscoll =

American drummer (1946–1987)

- Born: April 18, 1946
- Died: June 8, 1987 (aged 41) Ithaca, New York, U.S.
- Genres: Rock, R&B
- Occupation: Drummer
- Years active: 1965–1987

John Gary Driscoll (April 18, 1946 – June 8, 1987) was an American R&B-style rock drummer who performed in a number of successful bands from the 1960s until his unsolved murder.

== Music career ==
He first entered the music scene when he joined Ronnie Dio and the Prophets in June 1965, fronted by Ronnie James Dio. The band transformed into the Electric Elves, the Elves, and finally Elf in 1969, releasing a few singles along the way. They were eventually discovered by Deep Purple bassist Roger Glover who went on to produce all three of Elf's studio albums.

Elf disbanded in 1975 when Gary Driscoll, Ronnie James Dio, Micky Lee Soule (Elf's keyboardist), and Craig Gruber (their bassist) were recruited by Deep Purple guitarist Ritchie Blackmore to form the rock band Rainbow.

Driscoll was dismissed from Rainbow shortly after their debut album entitled Ritchie Blackmore's Rainbow was recorded. It is speculated that firing Gary was simply due to his R&B style of drumming, which did not sit well with Blackmore. Driscoll was later replaced with British hard rocker, Cozy Powell.

Although he was dismissed from Rainbow, Blackmore later remembered the drummer fondly but said he was very clumsy in the studio and live with Elf.

After his departure from Rainbow, Driscoll played in the band Dakota (1978–1980, from Scranton, formerly the Jerry Kelly Band), before starting Bible Black with Craig Gruber, future Blue Cheer guitarist Duck MacDonald and singer Jeff Fenholt. This band released their self-titled album as well as the albums Ground Zero and, with a few other musicians, Burning at the Speed of Light, none of which sold well. Driscoll found a day job in tile installation, and made a little extra money on the side as a session musician.

== Murder ==
Driscoll was murdered in Ithaca, New York, on June 8, 1987. He had a residence nine miles away in Newfield. Driscoll often visited his friend Robert Gelinas in Ithaca, and it was in the basement of this building that Driscoll was found dead, severely beaten and stabbed, with two gunshots to the head. Gelinas sold drugs out of his apartment, and had recently resorted to sleeping in a motel with his girlfriend Lynette Tome in order to hide from persistent customers disturbing him late at night, especially John Shillingford who had argued angrily with Gelinas over a cocaine sale. Shillingford carried a 32-caliber handgun which he stated was for defense against Charles Harvey who was an associate of Gelinas in the drug trade.

Driscoll stopped by the apartment on June 7 as Gelinas and Tome were leaving for the night, and they said he could stay if he wanted to. Shillingford apparently entered the building and beat Driscoll late that night or early the next morning, cut him with a knife, and fired his gun twice at Driscoll's head. The gun was discarded nearby, recovered by police. Shillingford's fingerprints were identified on Driscoll's car found abandoned a few miles north at Cayuga Shopping Center. Shillingford was acquitted after his attorney successfully challenged the handgun evidence. The handgun had been found on a roadway with a broken grip, and pieces of the grip were also found in a grassy field. Defense alleged that police investigators had planted evidence at the crime scene, involving pieces of the gun grip reportedly found days later on the carpet of the apartment, which had already been searched thoroughly.

== See also ==
- List of unsolved murders (1980–1999)
