= John Halas =

Hungarian-British animator (1912–1995)

- Born: János Halász; 16 April 1912; Budapest, Austria-Hungary
- Died: 21 January 1995 (aged 82); London, England
- Occupation: Animator
- Years active: 1936–1995
- Height: 1.80 m (5 ft 11 in)
- Website: halasandbatchelor.co.uk

John Halas OBE (born János Halász; 16 April 1912 – 21 January 1995) was a Hungarian-British animator. Together with Gyula Macskássy (an acquaintance from Sándor Bortnyik's Bauhaus art studio, Műhely), and Félix Kassowitz, Halász co-founded Hungary's first animation studio, Coloriton, in 1932. Coloriton existed for 4 years, producing animations for cinemas, including Boldog király kincse ("The Treasure of the Joyful King"). Halász learned his craft under George Pal, but launched his own career in 1934, and two years later moved to the United Kingdom where later, with his wife Joy Batchelor, founded Halas and Batchelor in 1940.

Over the years they made over 70 short subjects during the war, using propaganda from the time. Their film Animal Farm (1954), was the first full-length animated film made in Great Britain. They also produced a number of animated TV series, including Foo Foo, and Snip and Snap (1960) and the music video Love Is All by Roger Glover. He received a Lifetime Achievement Award at the World Festival of Animated Film - Animafest Zagreb in 1990. Halas died on 21 January 1995, aged 82.

== Filmography ==
- The Cartoons of Halas & Batchelor (2000)
- Halas and Batchelor Cartoons: an animated history; Paul Wells, ed. London: Southbank, (2006) (book & DVD; DVD contains Magic canvas, 1948; The figurehead, 1953; The history of the cinema, 1957; Automania 2000; The symphony orchestra, 1964; Dilemma, 1981; Know your Europeans UK, 1995)
