= Eddie Hardin =

English musician (1949-2015)

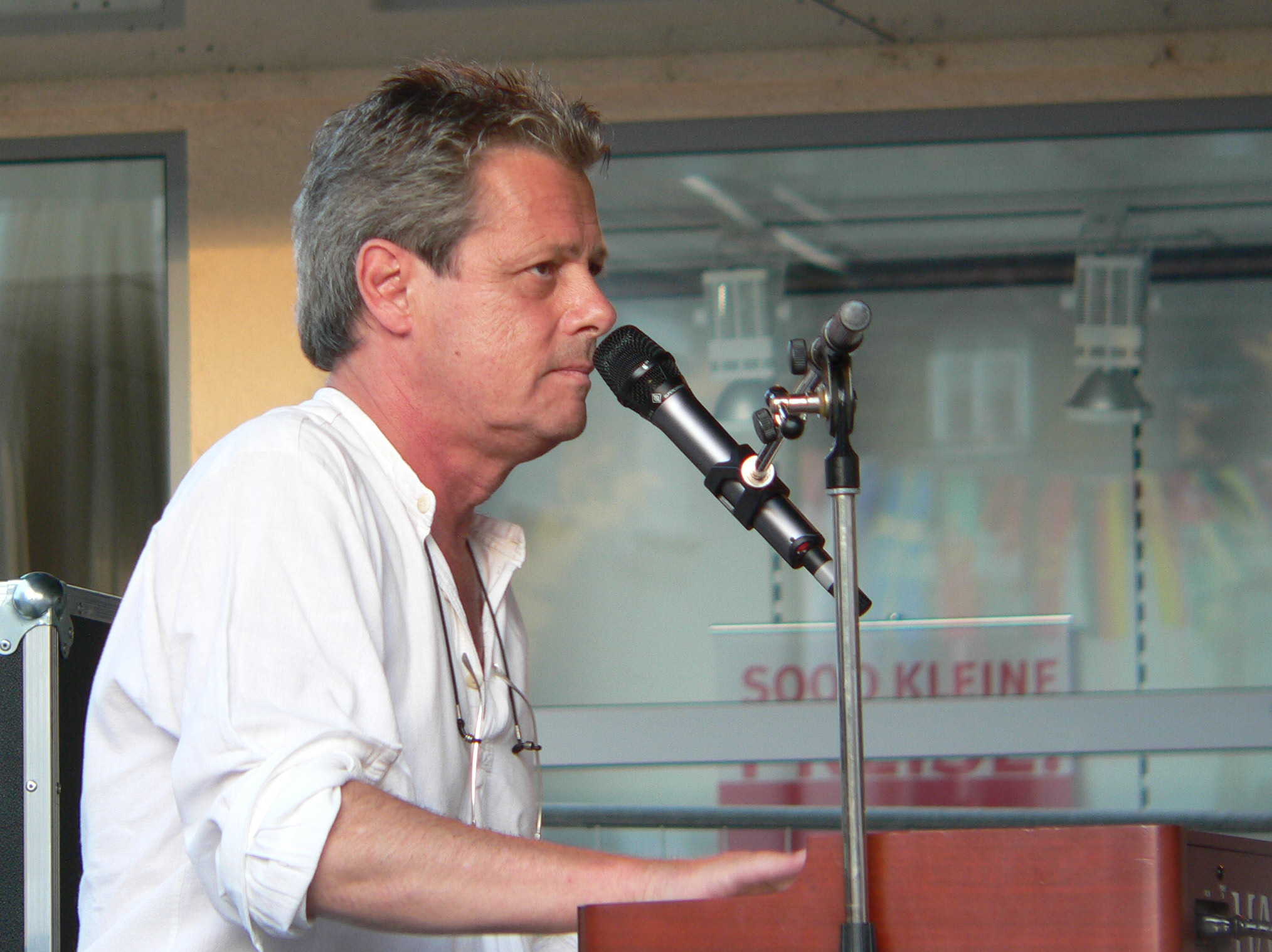
- Hardin performing in 2006

Background information
- Born: Edward Harding; 19 February 1949; London, England
- Died: 22 July 2015 (aged 66)
- Genres: Rock; blues-rock
- Occupations: Pianist; singer-songwriter
- Instruments: Piano; vocals
- Years active: 1967–2015
- Labels: Vertigo; Eagle; RCA; Teldec; See for Miles; Repertoire
- Website: eddiehardin.com

Eddie Hardin (19 February 1949 – 22 July 2015) was an English rock pianist and singer-songwriter. Born Edward Harding, he was best known for his associations with the Spencer Davis Group, Axis Point, and Hardin & York. Hardin, along with the drummer, Pete York, left the Spencer Davis Group on 26 October 1968, due to 'differences over musical policy'.

Hardin and York performed as a duo on and off over the years and Hardin cut his solo debut Home Is Where You Find It in 1972. Both men rejoined the Spencer Davis Group in 1973 but the band broke up again after two albums. Hardin continued as a solo artist, occasionally reuniting with York, much of his work from 1974 onwards was produced by Roger Glover who had recently left Deep Purple. Hardin featured on Glover's solo project The Butterfly Ball and the Grasshopper's Feast that year, singing lead on the track "Sir Maximus Mouse" and playing on and co-writing others, most notably the hit song "Love Is All".

His best known work is perhaps his lead vocal on the theme from the Thames Television children's magazine series Magpie, recorded by the then line-up of the Spencer Davis Group under the pseudonym The Murgatroyd Band.

He died following a heart attack on 22 July 2015, at the age of 66.

== Discography ==
=== a wild Uncertainty ===
- "Man With Money" / "Broken Truth" Planet (1965)

=== Spencer Davis Group ===
- With Their New Face On United Artists UA 1192 (1968)
- Gluggo Vertigo 6360088 (1973)
- Living in a Back Street Vertigo (1974)
- Catch You on the Rebop (Live in Europe 1973)
- Taking Out Time 1967–69 (Letters From Edith) (compilation)

==== Reissues ====
- With Their New Face On Repertoire REP 4684-WY (1997)
- Funky One Way OW 34529
- The Masters (compilation) Eagle Records (1999)

=== Hardin and York ===
- Tomorrow Today Bell SBLL125 (1969)
- The World's Smallest Big Band Bell SBLL136 (1970)
- For The World Bell SBLL141 (1971)
- Hardin & York with Charlie McCracken Vertigo 6360622 (1974)
- Hardin & New York Teldec 624595 (1979)
- Live at the Marquee 1971 RPM RPM135 (1994)
- Hardin & York Live Repertoire REP 4459-WY (1994) 1970 recording, previously a bootleg
- Still A Few Pages Left RPM Thunderbird CSA 106 (1995)

==== Reissues ====
- For The World See For Miles (1985)
- Tomorrow Today Repertoire REP 4481-WY (1994)
- World Smallest Big Band Repertoire REP 4482-WY (1994)

=== Axis Point ===
- Axis Point RCA PL 30039 (1979)
- Boast of the Town RCA PL 25277 (1980)

==== Reissues ====
- Axis Point / Boast of the Town (compilation) BGO (2002)

=== Solo albums ===
- Home Is Where You Find It, Decca TXS 106 (1972)
- Wizard's Convention, RCA Records (1976)
- You Can't Teach an Old Dog New Tricks, Attic LAT 1023 (1977)
- Circumstantial Evidence, RCA (1982)
- Eddie Hardin & Zak Starkey's Musical of Wind in the Willows, President (1985)
- Dawn 'Til Dusk, Coda Records (1986)
- Situations, President PTLS1089 (1987)
- Survival, Coda Records (1988)
- Wind in the Willows Live (featuring Maggie Bell, Graham Bonnet, Raphael Ravenscroft, Jon Lord and Zak Starkey), in-akustik INAK/BOSE INAK 9010 (1992)
- When We Were Young, in-akustik INAK 11005 (1996)
- Just Passing Through, self-released (2000)

==== Reissues ====
- You Can't Teach an Old Dog New Tricks Repertoire REP4464WY (1994)
- Wind in the Willows Live Angel Air (1998)
- Circumstantial Evidence Angel Air SJPCD024
- Eddie Hardin & Zak Starkey's Musical of Wind in the Willows RPM 327 (2002)
- Home Is Where You Find It RPM 271 (2004)

=== Composer ===
The 1975 pop song "Love Is All" from the album The Butterfly Ball and the Grasshopper's Feast by Roger Glover was credited to "Roger Glover & Friends" in the credits but was in reality sung by Ronnie James Dio and composed by Hardin.

=== As sideman ===
With Bo Diddley

- The London Bo Diddley Sessions (Chess, 1973)
