= Halas and Batchelor =

British animation company

- Industry: Animation studio
- Founded: 1940
- Founder: John Halas, Joy Batchelor
- Defunct: 1986
- Fate: Sold to Tyne Tees Television (early 1970s)
- Headquarters: London, Cainscross, United Kingdom
- Owner: John Halas and Joy Batchelor (until the beginning of the 70s); Tyne Tees Television (from the 70s until 1986)

Halas and Batchelor was a British animation company founded by husband and wife John Halas and Joy Batchelor. Halas was a Hungarian émigré to the United Kingdom. The company had studios in London and Cainscross, in the Stroud District of Gloucestershire.

== History ==
From 1936, John Halas ran a small animation unit that created commercials for theatrical distribution. Joy Batchelor, who already had experience in animation, began working with Halas in 1938 after she responded to Halas's advertisement for an assistant, and they founded Halas and Batchelor in 1940 to create war information and propaganda films. Approximately 70 films were created for the Ministry of Information, the War Office, and the Admiralty over the course of World War II; most of these were shorts intended to improve morale or spur on increased contributions to the war effort, such as Dustbin Parade, about recycling, and Filling the Gap, about gardening. Halas and Batchelor also created a series of anti-fascist cartoons intended for viewing in the Middle East; starring an Arab boy named Abu, who was "enticed and misguided by the forces of Austrian Painter and Mussolini." The heavy workload (at one point the studios were creating a minute-long short every three weeks) and minimal budgets meant that simple animations with economically driven stories were the norm.

HB's first feature film Handling Ships (1945) was the first-ever British animated feature. After the war, they continued making short films while Animal Farm (1954) was being made, erroneously considered the first British animated feature. The studio grew from a small unit to a proper animation company, with several different British locations. Its best-known animation series were Foo Foo (1959–60), Popeye the Sailor (1960–62, for ABC Television in the United States), DoDo, The Kid from Outer Space (1965–70) and The Lone Ranger (1966–69). In the 1970s, Rankin/Bass contracted the company to produce several series, including The Jackson 5ive and The Osmonds. Halas and Batchelor also produced Snip and Snap (1960) and the animated music video for the song "Love Is All" from Roger Glover's album The Butterfly Ball and the Grasshopper's Feast (1976) and Kraftwerk's Autobahn (1979) by Roger Mainwood. The company also made the short satire Automania 2000, nominated for an Oscar in 1964.

As well as short films, the studio made a few feature films, such as Ruddigore (1967). The company was sold to Tyne Tees Television in the early 1970s, although Halas and Batchelor themselves broke away from this association after a few years. Most of the 2,000 films now form part of The Halas and Batchelor Collection, founded in 1996. This collection was part of a donation by the couple's daughter to the British Film Institute in 2010.

== Selected filmography ==
Year	Title	Notes	Ref.
1945	Handling Ships		
1948-1950	Charley	Seven shorts	
1954	Animal Farm		
1956	The Candlemaker		
1959-1960	Foo Foo	33 episodes	
1960	Snip and Snap	26 episodes	
1963	The Guns of Navarone	Excerpts	
1963	Automania 2000		
1965-1970	DoDo, The Kid from Outer Space	72 episodes	
1966	Ruddigore		
1970-1971	The Tomfoolery Show	17 episodes	
1972	The Osmonds	17 episodes	
1973	The Count of Monte Cristo	17 episodes	
