= The Butterfly Ball and the Grasshopper's Feast =

Studio album by Roger Glover
- Released: 18 November 1974 (UK); 16 October 1975 (US)
- Recorded: Summer 1974
- Studios: Kingsway Recorders, London
- Genres: Pop rock; psychedelic rock; hard rock; progressive rock
- Length: 48:28
- Labels: Purple Records (United Kingdom); UK Records (United States)
- Producers: Roger Glover, Alan G. Rainer

Roger Glover chronology
The Butterfly Ball and the Grasshopper's Feast (1974)	Elements (1978)

Singles from The Butterfly Ball
- 1. "Love is All" Released: 8 November 1974

Professional ratings
Review scores
Source	Rating
AllMusic	4/5 stars

The Butterfly Ball and the Grasshopper's Feast is a concept album and subsequent live rock opera written by Roger Glover. It appeared in 1974 and 1975 respectively, and was based on the children's poem of a similar title. The album cover design is from Alan Aldridge's design for a 1973 book based on the poem.

== Origin and production history ==
The work was originally conceived as a solo vehicle for Jon Lord to be produced by Roger Glover who had recently left Deep Purple. However, Lord proved too busy with Deep Purple, and Glover took up the reins on his own. Using his connections, Glover recruited a large cast of noted rock musicians, with a different vocalist for each character, including David Coverdale and Glenn Hughes. Les Binks, later of Judas Priest, and Michael Giles of King Crimson play drums on the album.

An accompanying animated short film, The Butterfly Ball, was made by the Halas & Batchelor company.

On 16 October 1975, a one-off performance at the Royal Albert Hall took place. Again it had a star-studded cast of rock musicians, most notably Ian Gillan who was drafted in at the last minute and received a standing ovation on his entrance. He replaced an unavailable Ronnie James Dio who had commitments with Ritchie Blackmore's Rainbow (although Dio did eventually get to perform the song at the Royal Albert Hall in 1999 as the guest of Deep Purple). Gillan had not performed since leaving Deep Purple in 1973. Also notable was the appearance of Twiggy as singer and actress and Vincent Price as narrator. Apart from most of the musicians involved in the studio recording, the concert also featured Jon Lord. The live concert was filmed and released in 1976, produced by Tony Klinger.

== Later appearance ==
Colin Meloy of The Decemberists has used the piece as intro music for the band's shows.

== Track listing ==
All tracks are written by Roger Glover, additional writers where noted.

Original album
No.	Title	Writer(s)	Vocals	Length
1.	"Dawn"			1:21
2.	"Get Ready"		Glenn Hughes	2:06
3.	"Saffron Dormouse and Lizzy Bee"		Barry St. John, Helen Chappelle	1:25
4.	"Harlequin Hare"	Ronnie James Dio, Micky Lee Soule	Neil Lancaster	1:26
5.	"Old Blind Mole"		John Goodison	1:11
6.	"Magician Moth"			1:33
7.	"No Solution"		Micky Lee Soule	3:28
8.	"Behind the Smile"		David Coverdale	1:46
9.	"Fly Away"		Liza Strike	2:22
10.	"Aranea"		Judi Kuhl	1:37
11.	"Sitting in a Dream"		Ronnie James Dio	3:40
12.	"Waiting"		Jimmy Helms	3:11
13.	"Sir Maximus Mouse"		Eddie Hardin	2:35
14.	"Dreams of Sir Bedivere"			4:09
15.	"Together Again"	Ronnie James Dio, Micky Lee Soule	Tony Ashton	2:05
16.	"Watch Out for the Bat"		John Gustafson	1:41
17.	"Little Chalk Blue *"	Eddie Hardin	John Lawton	3:44
18.	"The Feast"			1:48
19.	"Love is All"	Eddie Hardin, Ronnie James Dio	Dio	3:14
20.	"Homeward"	Hardin	Ronnie James Dio	4:12

1995 Reissue bonus tracks
No.	Title	Length
1.	"Love is All (Demo Version)"	3:04
2.	"Dawn (Remix)"	1:35
3.	"Magician Moth (Remix)"	1:37
4.	"Harlequin Hare (Remix)"	1:33
5.	"Magician Moth (Remix)"	1:34
6.	"No Solution (Remix)"	3:58
7.	"Waiting (Remix)"	3:58
8.	"Fly Away (Remix)"	2:24
9.	"Aranea (Remix)"	1:38

Film version from the concert 16 October 1975
No.	Title	Length
1.	"Dawn (feat Vincent Price)"
2.	"Get Ready (feat Glenn Hughes)"
3.	"Saffron Dormouse and Lizzy Bee (feat Helen Chappelle and Barry St. John)"
4.	"Together Again (feat Tony Ashton)"
5.	"Old Blind Mole (feat Earl Jordan)"
6.	"Magician Moth (feat Vincent Price)"
7.	"Watch Out for the Bat (feat John Gustafson)"
8.	"Aranea (feat Judi Kuhl)"
9.	"Sir Maximus Mouse (feat Eddie Hardin)"
10.	"Behind the Smile (feat David Coverdale)"
11.	"Little Chalk Blue (feat John Lawton)"
12.	"Waiting (feat Al Matthews)"
13.	"Sitting in a Dream (feat Ian Gillan)"
14.	"No Solution (feat Micky Lee Soule)"
15.	"The Feast (feat Vincent Price)"
16.	"Love is All (feat Ian Gillan )"
17.	"Homeward (feat Twiggy)"
18.	"Love is All (encore)"

- = Little Chalk Blue is on CD Reissue only

== Charts ==
Chart (1978)	Peak position
Australia (Kent Music Report)	12

== Personnel (original album) ==
- Jack Emblow - accordion
- Ray Fenwick - guitar
- Mike Moran, Ann Odell - piano
- Roger Glover - synthesiser, piano, guitar, bass guitar, percussion, backing vocals
- Eddie Hardin - piano, organ, synthesizer, backing vocals
- Eddie Jobson - violin
- Chris Karan - tabla
- Robin Thompson - bassoon
- Nigel Watson - saw
- Mo Foster - bass guitar, double bass, finger pops
- Les Binks - drums
- Mike Giles - drums
- Joanne Williams - backing vocals
- Kay Garner - backing vocals
- Judi Kuhl - backing vocals
- Barry St. John - backing vocals
- Helen Chappelle - backing vocals
- The Mountain Fjord Orchestra led by David Woodcock and conducted by Martin Ford, John Bell and Del Newman.
- Alan Aldridge, Harry Willock - cover design
- George Peckham - mastering
