= Love Is All (Roger Glover song) =

1974 song by Roger Glover

"Love Is All" is a 1974 pop song credited to Roger Glover & Guests in the credits, but in reality sung by American heavy metal singer Ronnie James Dio. It was featured on Glover's solo album The Butterfly Ball and the Grasshopper's Feast and the single – released in the UK on 8 November 1974 – was a number one-hit in the Netherlands and Belgium. It also reached number 10 in Australia. The song was notable for its music video, which featured an animated cartoon starring a lute-playing frog.

== Background ==
In June 1973, Roger Glover left Deep Purple because Ritchie Blackmore insisted on his dismissal simultaneous to the departure of Ian Gillan. Together with Jon Lord he worked on a solo project. Their plan was to make a rock opera based on William Plomer and Alan Aldridge's picture book The Butterfly Ball and the Grasshopper's Feast (1973), in itself based on the eponymous poem by British historian William Roscoe (1802). However, because Lord was too busy with Deep Purple, Glover decided to make it into a concept album recorded by himself and musicians like Glenn Hughes, David Coverdale, John Lawton and Ronnie James Dio. The resulting album was titled The Butterfly Ball and the Grasshopper's Feast.

Eddie Hardin wrote the song Love Is All based on a song featured in The Butterfly Ball and the Grasshopper's Feast named Love's all you need, which was inspired by The Beatles' song All You Need Is Love (1967). The song was sung by Ronnie James Dio, although the single was credited to Glover. The B-side was Old Blind Mole/Magician Moth.

== Music video ==
The song came with an animated music video featuring a lute playing frog gathering animals in the forest for the upcoming ball. The animation was created by the Halas and Batchelor studio and one of the animators was Harold Whitaker. The video received a lot of airplay over the decades, particularly as a fill-in during technical difficulties, such as on the French TV channel Antenne 2, and in the United States in children's TV programs such as The Great Space Coaster and Nickelodeon morning shows. Those random airings, together with the psychedelic tone of the clip and the lack of subtitles, made it very popular amongst young viewers.

== Reception ==
While Love Is All did little in the United Kingdom, it became an unexpected number one-hit in the Netherlands and Belgium for several weeks. In the Dutch Top 40, it reached number one for three weeks. In 1978, the video was featured on the Australian music show Countdown, and the song reached number 10 on the Australian charts. The video was also used regularly as an interstitial program on Australia's ABC TV.

== Cover versions ==
The song was covered by Sacha Distel in 1976. Sergeant Frog released a version in the 1980s. In 2002, Flemish singer Dana Winner released a cover version. Other artists who covered the song have been Gonzales (2008), Keedz (2010), Playing for Change (2013) and Arjen Lucassen (2023).

== In popular culture ==
The song was used in a 1991 French TV advertisement by Sironimo, a brand of flavored syrup.

In 2006, the song was used by Dutch political party CDA in its advertisements for the 2006 Dutch General Election.

In 2014, it was featured in the video game Just Dance 2015 by Ubisoft.

In 2021, it was the music to the latest Cartier advertisement.
