= Harold Whitaker =

British animator (1920–2013)

Harold Jackson Whitaker (5 June 1920 – 26 December 2013) was a British animator, whose credits included Animal Farm in 1954 and Heavy Metal in 1981. He first worked for Anson Dyer, before spending thirty years as an animator for Halas and Batchelor. He made a comic strip adaptation of Animal Farm in 1954.

Whitaker was born on 5 June 1920 in Cottingham, East Yorkshire. He was raised in Manchester and studied drawing at Macclesfield art school.

In 1981, Whitaker published a book, Timing for Animation. Timing for Animation was republished in 2002 to include an introduction written by John Lasseter, the President of Pixar Studios.

Whitaker later worked as an animator and storyboard artist on several films such as The Magic Voyage, Stowaways on the Ark, The Twelve Tasks of Asterix, Doctor in the Sky, When the Wind Blows, Wilhelm Busch – Die Trickfilm-Parade: Max und Moritz und andere Streiche and the television series The Dreamstone and Poddington Peas.

Whitaker died on 26 December 2013 at the age of 93.
