= Filet of Soul =

American folk-rock band

- Origin: Athens, Georgia, United States
- Genre: Folk rock
- Years active: 1996-unknown
- Label: Shank
- Members: Adam Beadles (vocals, saxophone, harmonica); Greg Beadles (vocals, guitar); Cornelius Freeman (percussion); Randy Chester (guitar, bass guitar, vocals)

Filet of Soul is an American folk-rock band from Athens and Atlanta, GA.

== History ==
The band was formed in 1996 by brothers Adam Beadles and Greg Beadles. Adam is the band's lead vocalist, with Greg the principal songwriter. The band was later joined by drummer Cornelius Freeman and bassist Seth Cain. In 1997, they released their first EP, The King Street Demos. In early 1998, the band's lineup was completed when Randy Chester was added. That year, Filet of Soul released its debut album, Incommunicado, on Shank Records. The band incorporated Christian themes into the album. In 1999, 7ball named the group one of the top 25 indie bands in America.

== Incommunicado ==
Incommunicado was released on November 3, 1998. Bill Mallonee produced the tracks "Away" and "Gravity". Mike Rimmer of Cross Rhythms wrote that the album was "such a brilliant coupling of the acoustic and the funky, it stands out from the pile!" and gave it an 8 out of 10 rating.

=== Track listing ===
1. "Away"
2. "Copperpot"
3. "Point of View"
4. "Gravity"
5. "These Times"
6. "Lower Me"
7. "About the Rain"
8. "Sebastian"
9. "POV (Reprise)"
10. "Broken Mirror"
11. "Freight Train"
