= Roger Glover =

British bassist (born 1945)

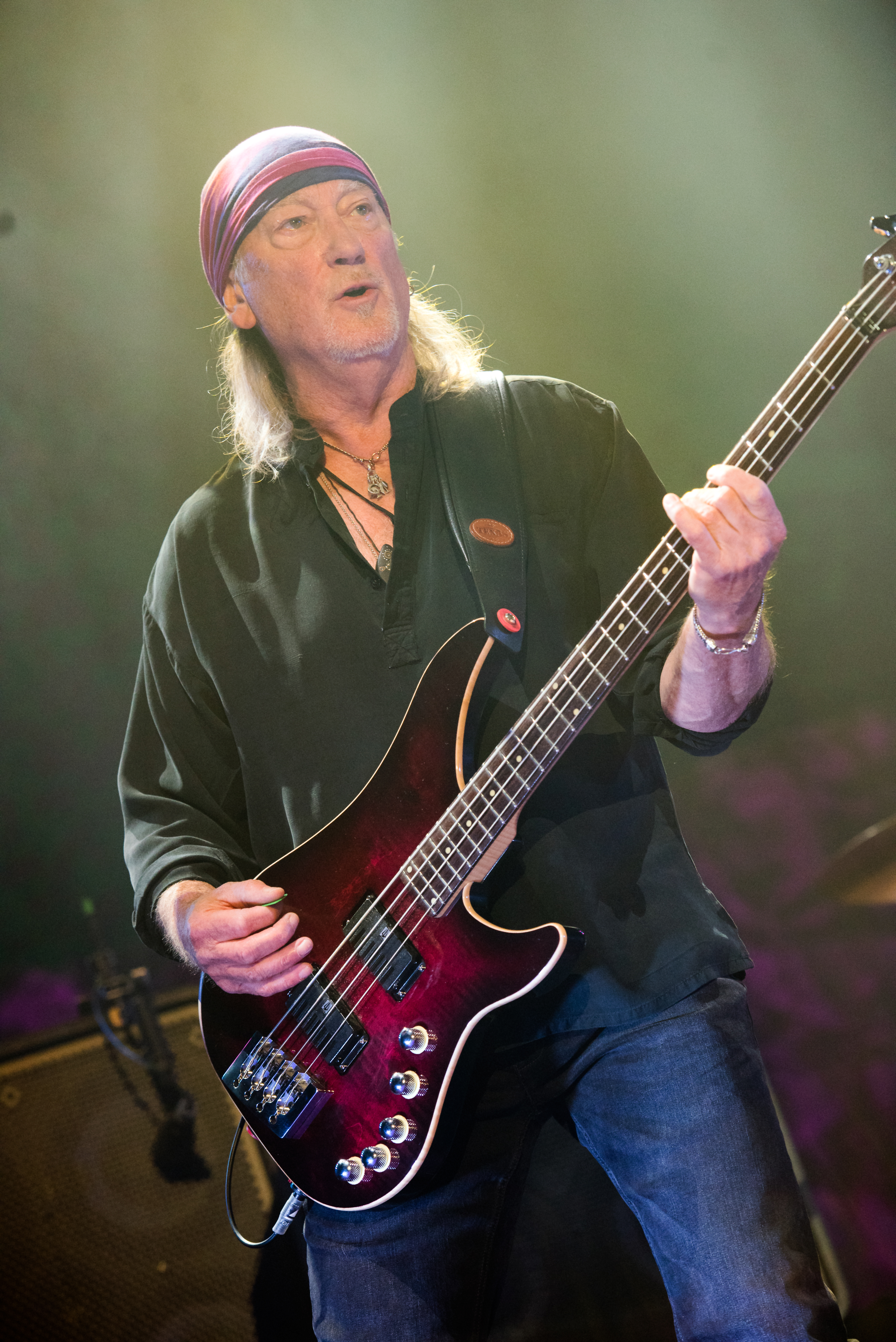
- Glover performing with Deep Purple in 2017

Background information
- Born: Roger David Glover; 30 November 1945 (age 80); Brecon, Wales
- Genres: Hard rock; heavy metal; pop rock; blues rock; progressive rock
- Occupations: Musician; songwriter; record producer
- Instruments: Bass guitar; keyboards
- Years active: 1962–present
- Member of: Deep Purple
- Formerly of: Rainbow; Episode Six; Gillan & Glover
- Website: Official site

Roger David Glover (born 30 November 1945) is a Welsh musician, songwriter, and record producer. He is best known as a bass guitarist and member of the hard rock band Deep Purple and formerly Rainbow. As a member of Deep Purple, Glover was inducted into the Rock and Roll Hall of Fame in April 2016.

== Early career ==
Glover was born near Brecon, Wales, and moved with his family to the South Kensington area of London at the age of nine. Around that time, his interests started to shift towards rock music, and by the time he was thirteen, he began playing guitar.

He later moved to the North London district of Pinner, and while at Harrow County School for Boys he formed his first band, Madisons, with a group of friends; in time this merged with a rival band to become Episode Six, a band which later featured Glover's future Deep Purple bandmate, vocalist Ian Gillan. The two left Episode Six in 1969 to join Deep Purple.

== Deep Purple and solo ==
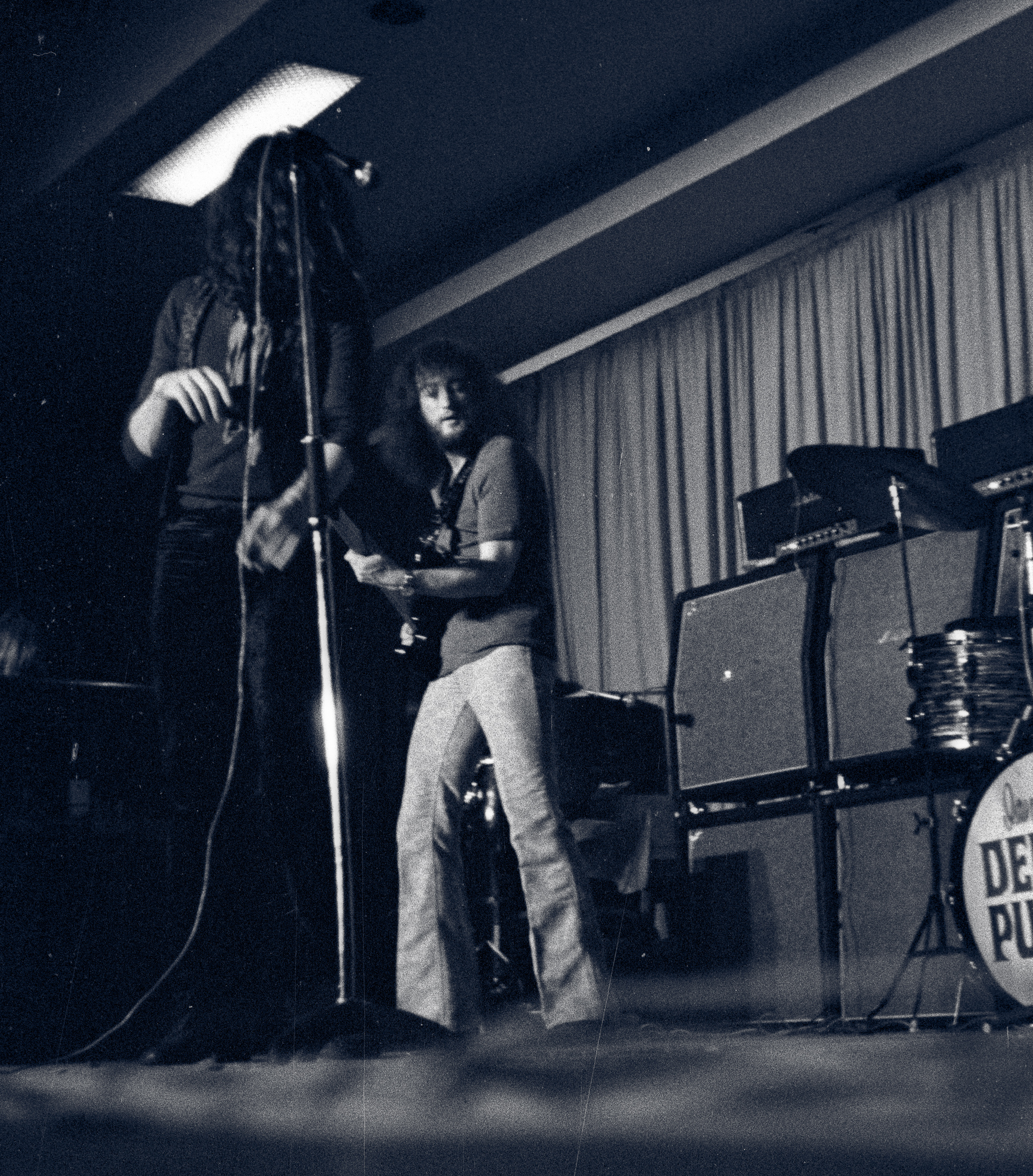
Deep Purple, Roger Glover 1970

Glover spent four years (1969–1973) with Deep Purple, during which the band saw their most successful releases in the albums Deep Purple in Rock, Fireball, Machine Head, Who Do We Think We Are and the live album Made in Japan. He is credited with developing the title for the band's iconic song "Smoke on the Water", thus inspiring the song's lyrics which were written by Ian Gillan. Glover says the title came to him when he awoke from a dream two days after the famous fire over Lake Geneva. While he liked the title, he was reluctant to have the band use it because he initially thought it sounded like a drug song. Glover also developed the guitar riff to "Maybe I'm a Leo", stating, "I wrote the riff to 'Maybe I'm a Leo' after hearing John Lennon's 'How Do You Sleep?'."

Glover contributed bass on Jon Lord's first solo album, Gemini Suite (1971), and was the featured soloist in the bass movement.

Glover departed Deep Purple, along with Gillan, after the band's second tour of Japan in June 1973.

Throughout the 1970s Glover produced albums and/or singles by such acts as Judas Priest, Nazareth, Elf, Status Quo, the Ian Gillan Band and David Coverdale.

In 1974 Glover released his first solo album, The Butterfly Ball and the Grasshopper's Feast, which generated the single "Love Is All", featuring lead vocals by Ronnie James Dio. The single did little in the UK, but became an unexpected number one hit song in the Netherlands, Belgium, and Australia. The song came with an animated music video starring a guitar-playing frog. In 1978 Glover's second album followed: Elements.

From 1979 to 1984 he was the bassist, lyricist and producer for Ritchie Blackmore's band, Rainbow, working on four of the group's studio albums.

In 1983 he recorded his third solo album, Mask, released the next year.

When Deep Purple reformed in April 1984, Glover returned to his old band where he has remained for the last four decades.

In 1988 Glover, along with fellow Deep Purple member Ian Gillan, recorded the side-project album Accidentally on Purpose. Almost two decades later Glover played with Gillan during Gillan's brief solo tour in 2006.

In 2002 Glover released his fourth post-DP album, entitled Snapshot, under the name Roger Glover and the Guilty Party. The album featured performances from Randall Bramblett (who shared co-writing credits on several tracks) as well as Glover's daughter, Gillian.

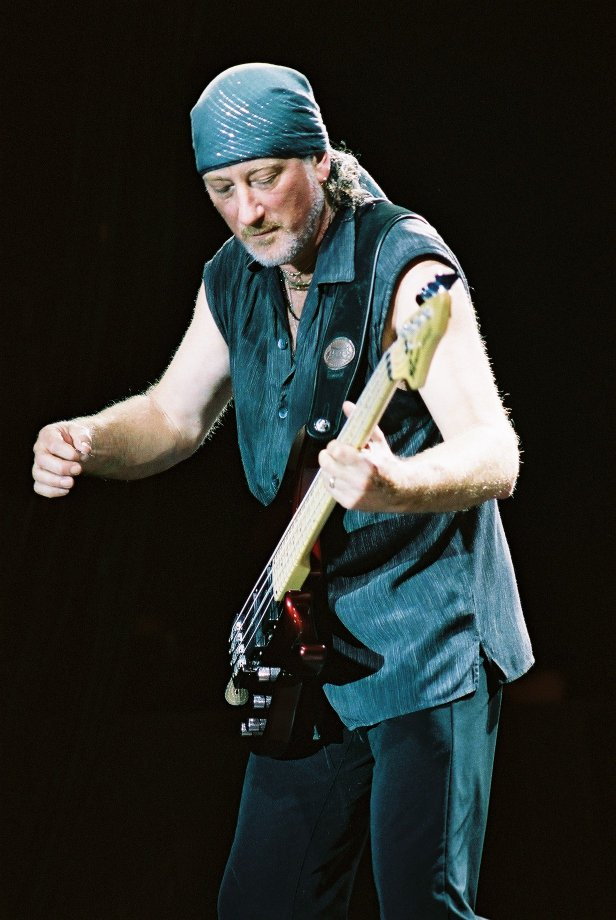
Roger Glover in concert at Big Flats, New York in 2002

In 2011 he released his second Guilty Party album, If Life Was Easy, which featured guest appearances by Nazareth's Dan McCafferty and Pete Agnew as well as Walther Gallay and Daniel "Sahaj" Ticotin.

== Notable collaborations and performances ==
In an interview for the Come Hell or High Water concert-documentary, he described how he was once forced to perform lead vocals for an entire Deep Purple concert in the 1970s due to Ian Gillan's illness. In 2021, he performed co-lead vocals on one track (The Battle of New Orleans) on the Turning to Crime album, the first time he has performed vocals of any kind on a Deep Purple record.

In 2001 Glover was among a host of bass players who contributed to Gov't Mule's double album The Deep End, recorded as a tribute to the late Allen Woody, Mule's original bassist. Glover played on Deep Purple's "Maybe I'm a Leo", which was one of Woody's favourite songs. On 3 May 2003, in New Orleans, Glover also took part in a special concert performed by Gov't Mule featuring appearances from all bass players who had contributed to The Deep End album.

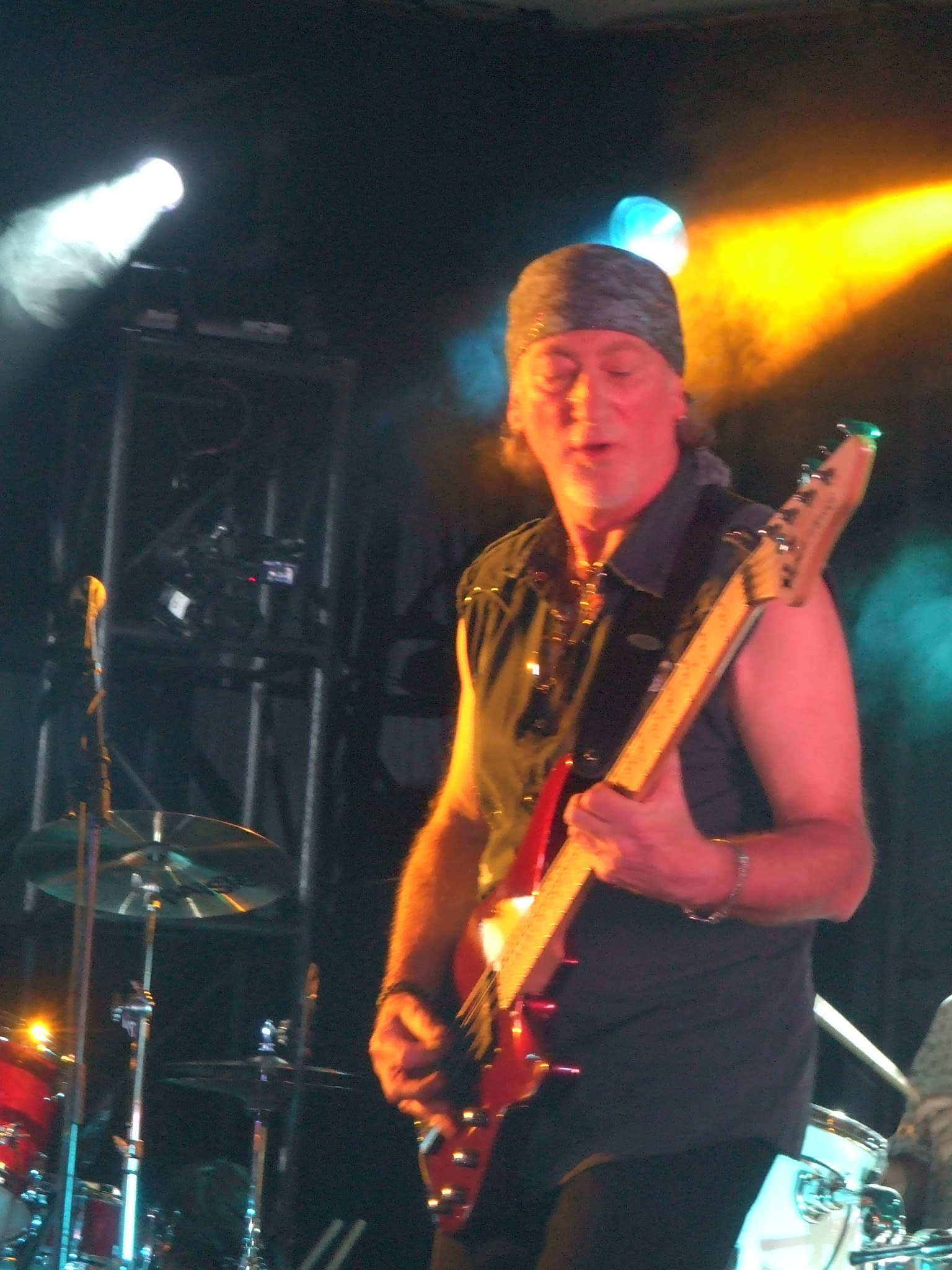
Roger Glover performing in London for the Sunflower Jam, 2007.

On 7 October 2007 Glover joined his former bandmate Jon Lord to perform Concerto for Group and Orchestra at the Royal & Derngate in Northampton. The concert also featured the Royal Philharmonic Orchestra conducted by Paul Mann.

In 2008 Glover played bass on a charity single called "Lucy's Song", written and produced by David Domminney of Rogue Studios in London and available at iTunes. Income from the sale went to The Linda McCartney Cancer Centre (specifically to promote their Field of Women event which took place at Liverpool Cricket Club on 6 July 2008).

On 21 March 2012 Ian Paice was playing a gig with the Deep Purple tribute band Purpendicular in Pratteln, Switzerland. The band received a surprise reinforcement as Roger Glover "happened to be in the neighbourhood" and joined them on stage.

== Personal life ==
Glover has been married twice and has three daughters. The eldest, musician Gillian Glover (born 1976), is from his first marriage. He currently lives in Switzerland with his partner and their two daughters.

== Gear ==
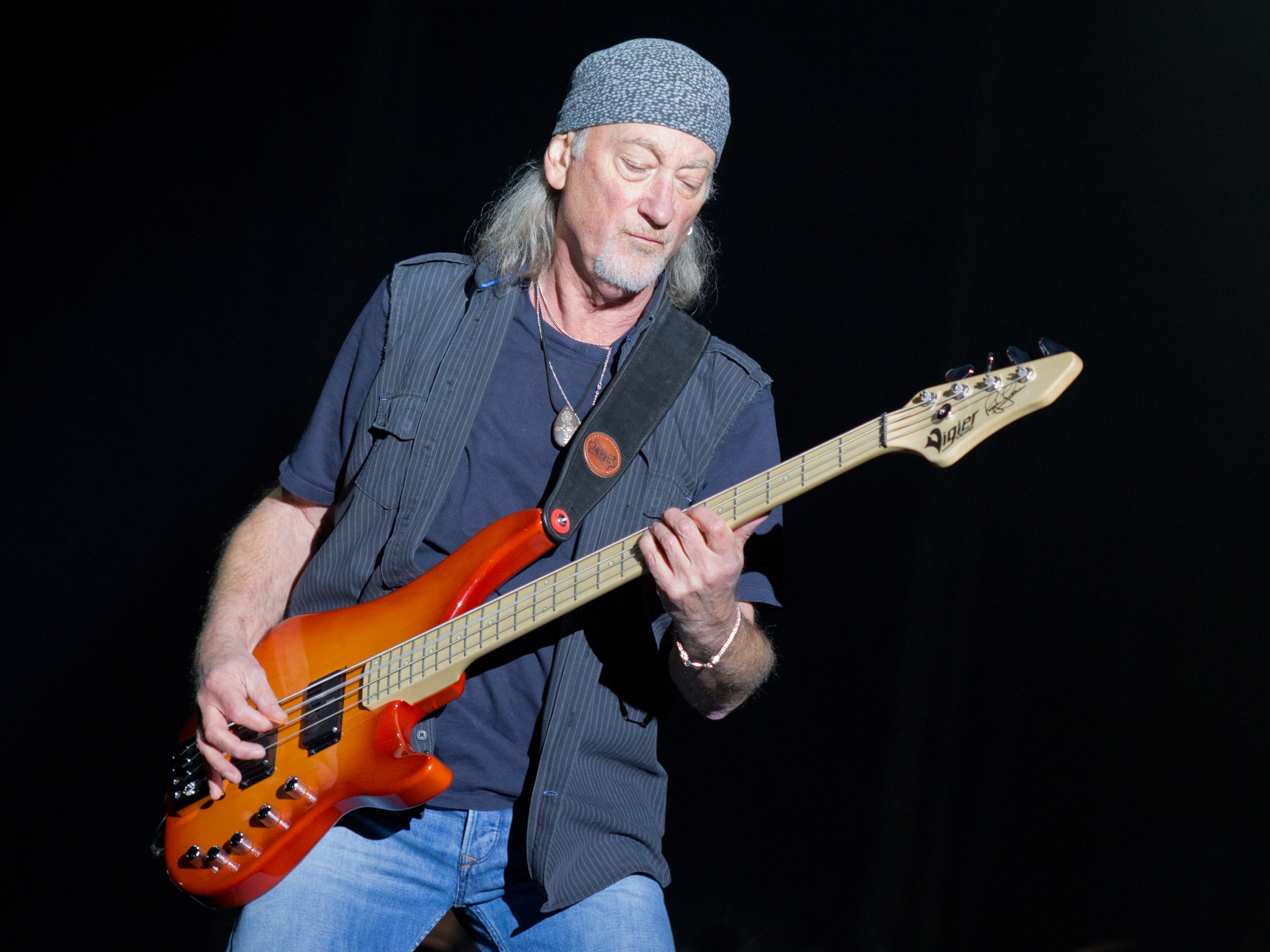
Glover performing live with Deep Purple in 2013.

Roger Glover played Fender Precision, Fender Mustang and Rickenbacker 4001 basses during his early years with Deep Purple. In late 1970s, he used a Gibson Thunderbird. In the mid-1980s Roger used Peavey Foundation with a neck from Peavey Fury Bass. Since the mid-1990s, he has used Vigier Bass Guitars, SWR heads and cabinets, and Picato and Ernie Ball Inc. strings.

== Discography ==
Episode Six

- Put Yourself in My Place (1987)
- BBC Radio 1 Live 1998/1969 (1997)
- The Complete Episode Six (1991)
- Cornflakes and Crazyfoam (2002)
- Love, Hate, Revenge (2005)

Compilation album of songs recorded between 1964 and 1969

Solo

- Let's Go to the Disco/Broken Man (single) (1974, with Ray Fenwick, released under the name Marlon)
- The Butterfly Ball and the Grasshopper's Feast (1974)
- Strawberry Fields Forever/Isolated Lady (single) (1975, with Eddie Hardin)
- Elements (1978)
- Mask (1984)
- Accidentally on Purpose (1988, with Ian Gillan)
- Snapshot (2002)
- If Life Was Easy (2011)

Guest appearances

- Rupert Hine & David MacIver – Pick Up a Bone (1971)
- Jon Lord – Gemini Suite (1972)
- Dave Cousins – Two Weeks Last Summer (1972)
- Nazareth – Loud 'n' Proud (1973, "Free Wheeler")
- Andy Mackay – In Search For Eddie Riff (1974)
- Dan McCafferty – Dan McCafferty (1975)
- Ian Gillan Band – Child in Time (1976)
- Eddie Hardin – Wizard's Convention (1976, "Loose Ends")
- John Perry – Sunset Wading (1976)
- Eddie Hardin – You Can't Teach An Old Dog New Tricks (1977)
- David Coverdale – White Snake (1977)
- Strawbs - The Best of Strawbs (1978)
- David Coverdale – Northwinds (1978)
- Joe Breen – More Than Meets The Eye (1978)
- Wheels – Don't Be Strange (1979)
- Eddie Hardin – Circumstantial Evidence (1982)
- Ian Gillan – Naked Thunder (1990, "No More Cane on the Brazos")
- Pretty Maids – Jump The Gun (1990, "Dream On")
- Ian Gillan – Cherkazoo and Other Stories (1992, archival recordings from 1972 to 1974)
- Gov't Mule – The Deep End, Volume 1 (2001, "Maybe I'm A Leo")
- Gov't Mule – The Deepest End, Live in Concert (2003, "Maybe I'm A Leo")
- Ian Gillan – Gillan's Inn (2006)
- Domminney – Lucy's Song (charity single for Field for Women) (2008)
- Bernhard Welz – Stay Tuned (2010, "Believe Me")
- Walther Gallay – Stigmates (2014)
- Celebrating Jon Lord (2014)
- Purpendicular – This Is The Thing #1 (2015)
- Alice Cooper – Paranormal (2017)

As producer

- Rupert Hine & David MacIver – Pick Up A Bone (1971)
- Elf – Elf (1972, with Ian Paice)
- Nazareth – Razamanaz (1973)
- Nazareth – Loud 'n' Proud (1974)
- Nazareth – Rampant (1974)
- Spencer Davis Group – Living in a Back Street (1974)
- Hardin & York, with Charlie McCracken – Hardin & York, with Charlie McCracken (1974, two tracks only)
- Elf – Carolina County Ball (1974)
- Elf – Trying to Burn the Sun (1975)
- Reflections – Moon Power/Little Star (single) (1975)
- Strapps – Strapps (1976)
- Ian Gillan Band – Child in Time (1976)
- Rory Gallagher – Calling Card (1976)
- Status Quo – Wild Side of Life/All Through The Night (single) (1976)
- Judas Priest – Sin After Sin (1977)
- Young & Moody – Young & Moody (1977)
- Eddie Hardin – You Can't Teach An Old Dog New Tricks (1977)
- Strapps – Secret Damage (1977, with Louie Austin and Chris Kimsey)
- David Coverdale – White Snake (1977)
- David Coverdale – Northwinds (1978)
- Barbi Benton – Ain't That Just the Way (1978)
- Joe Breen – More Than Meets The Eye (1978)
- Grand Theft – Have You Seen This Band? (1978)
- Rainbow – Down to Earth (1979)
- Young & Moody – Devil Went Down To Georgia/You Can't Catch Me (single) (1979)
- Young & Moody – All The Good Friends/Playing Your Game (single) (1980)
- Michael Schenker Group – The Michael Schenker Group (1980)
- Rainbow – Difficult to Cure (1981)
- Rainbow – Straight Between the Eyes (1982)
- Rainbow – Bent Out of Shape (1983)
- Deep Purple – Perfect Strangers (1984, with Deep Purple)
- Rainbow – Finyl Vinyl (1986)
- Deep Purple – The House of Blue Light (1987, with Deep Purple)
- Pretty Maids – Jump the Gun (1990)
- Deep Purple – Slaves and Masters (1990)
- Deep Purple – The Battle Rages On... (1993, with Thom Panunzio)
- Deep Purple – Purpendicular (1996)
- Deep Purple – Abandon (1998)
- Dream Theater – Made in Japan (2006)
- Gillian Glover – Red Handed (2007, additional production)
- Café Bertrand – L'Art délicat du Rock & Roll (2008, mixing)
- Young & Moody – Back for the Last Time Again (2011, archive recordings)

Film and TV appearances

- 1976 The Butterfly Ball (feature film)
- 1991 Deep Purple – Heavy Metal Pioneers (Warner, interviewee)
- 1995 Rock Family Trees, ep. Deep Purple (TV, interviewee)
- 1996 In a Metal Mood
- 2000 100 Greatest Artists of Hard Rock (TV, interviewee)
- 2002 Gov't Mule – Rising Low (feature)
- 2002 Classic Albums, ep. Deep Purple – Machine Head (Granada, interviewee)
- 2004 Roger Glover – Made in Wales (ITV, interviewee)
- 2006 Memo – Ivan Pedersen's 40 års karriere (feature, interviewee)
- 2007 Ian Gillan – Highway Star: A Journey in Rock (feature, interviewee)
- 2011 Metal Evolution, ep. Early Metal, Part 2: UK Division (VH1, interviewee)
- 2013 Behind The Music Remastered, ep. Deep Purple (VH1, interviewee)
