= The Very Best of Rainbow =

Greatest hits album by Rainbow
- Released: 11 August 1997
- Recorded: 1975–1983
- Genre: Hard rock, heavy metal
- Length: 77:40
- Label: Polydor

Rainbow compilation albums chronology
The Best of Rainbow (1981)	The Very Best of Rainbow (1997)	20th Century Masters – The Millennium Collection: The Best of Rainbow (2000)

Professional ratings
Review scores
Source	Rating
AllMusic	4/5 stars

The Very Best of Rainbow is a greatest hits compilation album by the British hard rock band Rainbow. It was released in 1997 and features material ranging from 1975's Ritchie Blackmore's Rainbow to 1983's Bent Out of Shape.

The front cover comes from the inside of the first Rainbow album, Ritchie Blackmore's Rainbow, and is actually a picture of Ritchie Blackmore playing with his previous band, Deep Purple.

== Track listing ==
1. "Man on the Silver Mountain" (Ritchie Blackmore, Ronnie James Dio) - 4:37 (from Ritchie Blackmore's Rainbow, 1975)
2. "Catch the Rainbow" (Blackmore, Dio) - 6:38 (from Ritchie Blackmore's Rainbow, 1975)
3. "Starstruck" (Blackmore, Dio) - 4:06 (from Rising, 1976)
4. "Stargazer" (Blackmore, Dio) - 8:26 (from Rising, 1976)
5. "Kill the King" (Blackmore, Dio, Cozy Powell) - 4:28 (from Long Live Rock 'n' Roll, 1978)
6. "Long Live Rock 'n' Roll" (Blackmore, Dio) - 4:23 (from Long Live Rock 'n' Roll, 1978)
7. "Gates of Babylon" (Blackmore, Dio) - 6:46 (from Long Live Rock 'n' Roll, 1978)
8. "Since You Been Gone" (Russ Ballard) - 3:17 (from Down to Earth, 1979)
9. "All Night Long" (Blackmore, Roger Glover) - 3:50 (from Down to Earth, 1979)
10. "I Surrender" (Ballard) - 4:01 (from Difficult to Cure, 1981)
11. "Can't Happen Here" (Blackmore, Glover) - 4:57 (from Difficult to Cure, 1981)
12. "Jealous Lover" (Blackmore, Joe Lynn Turner) - 3:11 (from Jealous Lover EP, 1981)
13. "Stone Cold" (Blackmore, Glover, Turner) - 5:17 (from Straight Between the Eyes, 1982)
14. "Power" (Blackmore, Glover, Turner) - 4:26 (from Straight Between the Eyes, 1982)
15. "Can't Let You Go" (Blackmore, Turner, David Rosenthal) - 4:20 (from Bent Out of Shape, 1983)
16. "Street of Dreams" (Blackmore, Turner) - 4:26 (from Bent Out of Shape, 1983)

Tracks 1–7 feature Ronnie James Dio on lead vocals.
Tracks 8–9 feature Graham Bonnet.
Tracks 10–16 feature Joe Lynn Turner.

== Charts ==
Chart (1997)	Peak position
Japanese Albums (Oricon)	253

Chart (2025)	Peak position
Greek Albums (IFPI)	35

== Certifications ==
Region	Certification	Certified units/sales
United Kingdom (BPI)	Silver	60,000^{^}
^{^} Shipments figures based on certification alone.
