= Rainbow discography =

- Studio albums: 8
- Extended plays: 3
- Live albums: 16
- Compilation albums: 16
- Singles: 24
- Video albums: 10
- Music videos: 12
- Promotional singles: 6
- Box sets: 8

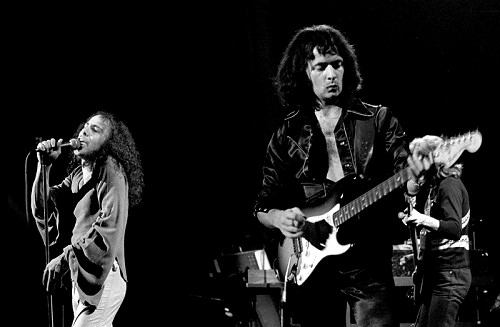
Rainbow performing in Oslo, Norway

The following is a comprehensive discography of Rainbow, an English hard rock band. They have released 8 studio albums, 16 live albums, 16 compilation albums, 8 box sets, 3 EPs, 24 singles, 10 video albums and 12 music videos.

== Albums ==
=== Studio albums ===
Title	Album details	Peak chart positions										Certifications
Title	Album details	UK	AUS	CAN	FIN	GER	JPN	NOR	NLD	SWE	US	Certifications
Ritchie Blackmore's Rainbow	Released: 4 August 1975; Label: Oyster, Polydor; Formats: LP, MC, 8-track	11	55	83	—	—	26	10	—	24	30	UK: Silver
Rising	Released: 17 May 1976; Label: Oyster, Polydor; Formats: LP, MC, 8-track	11	33	17	—	38	12	—	—	23	48	UK: Gold (Original Edition); UK: Silver (Deluxe Edition); AUS: Gold; JPN: Gold
Long Live Rock 'n' Roll	Released: 14 April 1978; Label: Polydor; Formats: LP, MC, 8-track	7	43	94	14	26	9	12	11	18	89	UK: Silver
Down to Earth	Released: 3 August 1979; Label: Polydor; Formats: LP, MC, 8-track	6	27	—	26	19	15	—	—	17	66	UK: Gold
Difficult to Cure	Released: 9 February 1981; Label: Polydor; Formats: LP, MC, 8-track	3	77	—	1	13	12	17	14	9	50	UK: Gold; FIN: Gold; JPN: Gold
Straight Between the Eyes	Released: 14 April 1982; Label: Polydor; Formats: LP, MC, 8-track	5	86	17	2	21	8	12	19	7	30	UK: Gold; FIN: Gold
Bent Out of Shape	Released: 9 September 1983; Label: Polydor; Formats: LP, MC, 8-track	11	—	93	2	25	3	6	44	6	34	
Stranger in Us All	Released: 11 September 1995; Label: RCA/BMG; Formats: CD, MC	102	—	—	6	36	7	38	70	8	—	JPN: Gold
"—" denotes releases that did not chart or were not released in that territory.

=== Live albums ===
Title	Album details	Peak chart positions										Certifications
Title	Album details	UK	AUS	FIN	GER	JPN	NOR	NLD	SWE	SWI	US	Certifications
On Stage (recorded 1976)	Released: 15 July 1977; Label: Oyster, Polydor; Formats: 2×LP, MC, 8-track	7	22	21	28	6	17	29	25	—	65	UK: Silver; JPN: Gold
Finyl Vinyl (recorded 1978-1984)	Released: 24 February 1986; Label: Polydor, Mercury; Formats: 2×CD, 2×LP, 2×MC	31	—	35	—	20	—	—	25	—	87	
Live in Germany 1976 (recorded 1976)	Released: 5 November 1990; Label: Connoisseur Collection; Formats: 2×CD, 2×LP, MC	—	—	35	—	—	—	—	—	—	—	
Live in Munich 1977 (recorded 1977)	Released: 13 June 2006; Label: Eagle; Formats: 2×CD	—	—	73	—	—	—	—	—	—	—	
Live In Köln 1976 (recorded 1976)	Released: 17 July 2006; Label: AFM/Hummingbird; Formats: 2×CD; First released as part of the Deutschland Tournee 1976 box set	—	—	—	—	—	—	—	—	—	—	
Live In Düsseldorf 1976 (recorded 1976)	Released: 12 February 2007; Label: AFM/Hummingbird; Formats: 2×CD; First released as part of the Deutschland Tournee 1976 box set	—	—	—	—	—	—	—	—	—	—	
Live In Nürnberg 1976 (recorded 1976)	Released: 10 December 2007; Label: AFM/Hummingbird; Formats: 2×CD; First released as part of the Deutschland Tournee 1976 box set	—	—	—	—	—	—	—	—	—	—	
Black Masquerade – Live in Rockpalast 1995 (recorded 1995)	Released: 7 August 2013; Label: Eagle; Formats: 2×CD, digital download	—	—	—	14	—	—	—	—	—	—	
Denver 1979 (recorded 1979)	Released: 12 May 2015; Label: Cleopatra/Purple Pyramid; Formats: 2×LP, digital download; Also released as part of the Down to Earth Tour 1979 box set	—	—	—	—	—	—	—	—	—	—	
Long Island 1979 (recorded 1979)	Released: 21 August 2015; Label: Cleopatra/Purple Pyramid; Formats: 2×LP; Also released as part of the Down to Earth Tour 1979 box set	—	—	—	—	—	—	—	—	—	—	
Live in Japan 1984 (recorded 1984)	Released: 18 November 2015; Label: Eagle; Formats: 2×CD; Japan-only release	—	—	—	—	—	—	—	—	—	—	
Monsters of Rock – Live at Donington 1980 (recorded 1980)	Released: 15 April 2016; Label: Eagle; Formats: CD, 2×CD, digital download	—	—	—	—	12	—	—	—	—	—	
Boston 1981 (recorded 1981)	Released: 13 May 2016; Label: Purple Pyramid; Formats: CD, 2×LP, digital download	—	—	—	—	—	—	—	—	—	—	
Memories in Rock – Live in Germany 2016 (recorded 2016)	Released: 18 November 2016; Label: Eagle; Formats: 2×CD, 3×LP, digital download	—	—	—	—	—	—	—	—	56	—	
Live in Birmingham 2016 (recorded 2016)	Released: 31 May 2017; Label: Eagle; Formats: 2×CD, digital download	—	—	—	—	45	—	—	—	83	—	
Memories in Rock II – Live in UK 2017 (recorded 2017)	Released: 4 April 2018; Label: Minstrel Hall Music; Formats: 2×CD, 3×LP, digital download	—	—	—	37	31	26	—	—	48	—	
"—" denotes releases that did not chart or were not released in that territory.

=== Compilation albums ===
Title	Album details	Peak chart positions					Certifications
Title	Album details	UK	FIN	JPN	SWE	US	Certifications
The Best of Rainbow (Note: This Japan-only release is slightly different from the subsequent internationally-released compilation, featuring a different cover and track listing. The later-released compilation was also released in Japan.)	Released: 28 January 1981; Label: Polydor; Formats: 2×LP; Japan-only release	—	—	48	—	—	
The Best of Rainbow	Released: 13 November 1981; Label: Polydor; Formats: 2×LP, MC	14	—	—	—	—	UK: Gold
The Best	Released: 25 November 1990; Label: Polydor; Formats: CD; Japan-only release	—	—	—	—	—	
The Very Best of Rainbow	Released: 11 August 1997; Label: Polydor; Formats: CD	197 (Note: Chart position in 2001)	—	—	—	—	UK: Silver
20th Century Masters – The Millennium Collection: The Best of Rainbow	Released: 3 October 2000; Label: Polydor; Formats: CD	—	—	—	—	—	
Classic Rainbow: The Universal Masters Collection	Released: 2001; Label: Polydor; Formats: CD	—	—	—	—	—	
Pot of Gold	Released: February 2002; Label: Spectrum Music; Formats: CD	—	—	—	—	—	
All Night Long: An Introduction	Released: May 2002; Label: Polydor; Formats: CD	—	—	—	—	—	
Catch the Rainbow: The Anthology	Released: 18 March 2003; Label: Polydor; Formats: 2×CD	—	26	—	—	—	UK: Silver
Winning Combinations: Deep Purple and Rainbow	Released: 17 June 2003; Label: Universal; Formats: CD	—	—	—	—	—	
Colour Collection	Released: 20 November 2006; Label: Universal; Formats: CD	—	—	—	—	—	
Anthology 1975–1984	Released: 7 September 2009; Label: Polydor; Formats: 2×CD	—	—	—	—	—	
Essential	Released: 18 April 2014; Label: Universal; Formats: CD	—	—	—	—	—	
The Polydor Years	Released: 24 November 2014; Label: Polydor; Formats: 9×LP	—	—	—	—	—	
Since You Been Gone – The Best of Rainbow	Released: December 2013; Label: Universal; Formats: CD	—	—	—	—	—	
Since You Been Gone – The Essential	Released: 19 May 2017; Label: Spectrum Music; Formats: 3×CD, digital download	—	—	—	—	—	
Rarities	Released: 27 March 2026; Label: Edsel Records; Formats: digital download	—	—	—	—	—	
"—" denotes releases that did not chart or were not released in that territory.

=== Box sets ===
Title	Album details	Peak chart positions	
Title	Album details	GER	JPN
Ritchie Blackmore's Rainbow	Released: 1983; Label: Polydor; Formats: 8×LP; Germany-only release	—	—
Deutschland Tournee 1976	Released: 24 May 2006; Label: Polydor; Formats: 6×CD; Japan-only release	—	75
The Polydor Years 1975–1986	Released: 23 May 2007; Label: Polydor; Formats: 10×CD; Japan-only release	—	—
5 Original Albums	Released: August 2011; Label: Universal; Formats: 5×CD	—	—
The Singles Box Set 1975–1986	Released: 3 February 2014; Label: Polydor; Formats: 19×CD, digital download	—	—
Down to Earth Tour 1979	Released: 21 August 2015; Label: Cleopatra; Formats: 3×CD, digital download	—	—
A Light in the Black 1975–1984	Released: 23 January 2015; Label: Polydor/Universal; Formats: 5×CD+DVD, digital download	39	47
Treasures – A Vinyl Collection	Released: 6 December 2019; Label: Ear Music; Formats: 11×LP	—	—
The Temple of the King: 1975-1976	Released: 27 March 2026; Label: Edsel Records; Formats: 9×CD	—	—
"—" denotes releases that did not chart or were not released in that territory.

== Extended plays ==
Title	EP details	Peak chart positions	
Title	EP details	UK	US
Live (Note: This EP, also known by its lead track "Kill the King", originally peaked at number 44 in 1977 on the UK Singles Chart. However, upon reissue in July 1981, it peaked at number 41.)	Released: 2 September 1977; Label: Oyster, Polydor; Formats: 7"	41	—
Jealous Lover	Released: 19 October 1981; Label: Polydor; Formats: 12"; US-only release	—	147
Rainbow Vorwärts	Released: 4 June 2019; Label: Minstrel Hall Music; Formats: CD; Limited tour-only release	—	—
"—" denotes releases that did not chart or were not released in that territory.

== Singles ==
Title	Year	Peak chart positions							Certifications	Album
Title	Year	UK	AUS	FIN	IRE	NL	US	US Main	Certifications	Album
"Man on the Silver Mountain"	1975	—	81	—	—	—	—	—		Ritchie Blackmore's Rainbow
"Temple of the King" (Note: "Temple of the King" was only released as a single in New Zealand, Southeast Asia and South America.)	1975	—	—	—	—	—	—	—		Ritchie Blackmore's Rainbow
"Still I'm Sad" (Note: "Still I'm Sad" was only released as a single in Italy.)	1975	—	—	—	—	—	—	—		Ritchie Blackmore's Rainbow
"Starstruck" (Note: "Starstruck" was not released as a single in the UK, but was released in the US, Continental Europe and Australasia.)	1976	—	—	—	—	—	—	—		Rising
"Long Live Rock 'n' Roll"	1978	33	—	—	—	—	—	—		Long Live Rock 'n' Roll
"L.A. Connection"	1978	40	—	—	—	—	—	—		Long Live Rock 'n' Roll
"Since You Been Gone"	1979	6	—	—	5	47	57	—	UK: Gold	Down to Earth
"All Night Long"	1980	5	—	—	6	—	110	—	UK: Silver	Down to Earth
"I Surrender"	1981	3	—	7	4	—	105	19	UK: Silver	Difficult to Cure
"Can't Happen Here"	1981	20	—	—	27	—	—	—		Difficult to Cure
"Difficult to Cure" (Note: "Difficult to Cure" was only released as a single in the Netherlands and Germany.)	1981	—	—	—	—	—	—	—		Difficult to Cure
"Jealous Lover" (Note: Whilst "Jealous Lover" was released as an EP in the US, it was released as a 2-track single in Canada.)	1981	—	—	—	—	—	—	13		Non-album single
"Magic" (Note: "Magic" was only released as a single in Japan.)	1981	—	—	—	—	—	—	—		Difficult to Cure
"Stone Cold"	1982	34	—	21	—	—	40	1		Straight Between the Eyes
"Death Alley Driver" (Note: "Death Alley Driver" was only released as a single in the Netherlands, Japan and Bolivia.)	1982	—	—	—	—	—	—	—		Straight Between the Eyes
"Street of Dreams"	1983	52	—	—	—	—	60	2		Bent Out of Shape
"Can't Let You Go"	1983	43	—	—	—	—	—	—		Bent Out of Shape
"Bad Girl"	1986	—	—	—	—	—	—	—		Finyl Vinyl
"Ariel" (Note: "Ariel" was only released as a single in Continental Europe.)	1995	—	—	—	—	—	—	—		Stranger in Us All
"Land of Hope and Glory"	2017	—	—	—	—	—	—	—		Non-album singles
"I Surrender" (re-recording)	2017	—	—	—	—	—	—	—		Non-album singles
"Waiting for a Sign"	2018	—	—	—	—	—	—	—		Memories in Rock II
"Black Sheep of the Family"	2019	—	—	—	—	—	—	—		Non-album singles
"The Storm"	2019	—	—	—	—	—	—	—		Non-album singles
"—" denotes releases that did not chart or were not released in that territory.

=== Promotional singles ===
Title	Year	Peak chart positions	Album
Title	Year	US Main	Album
"Tarot Woman" (Note: "Tarot Woman" was only released as a promotional single in Japan.)	1976	—	Rising
"Power" (Note: "Power" was only released as a promotional single in the US.)	1982	35	Straight Between the Eyes
"Stranded" (Note: "Stranded" was only released as a promotional single in the US.)	1983	—	Bent Out of Shape
"Desperate Heart" (Note: "Desperate Heart" was not released as a single, but charted due to airplay)	1984	52	Bent Out of Shape
"Hunting Humans (Insatiable)" (Note: "Hunting Humans (Insatiable)" was only released as a promotional single in Europe)	1995	—	Stranger in Us All
"Wolf to the Moon" (Note: "Wolf to the Moon" was only released as a promotional single in Japan.)	1995	—	Stranger in Us All
"—" denotes releases that did not chart or were not released in that territory.

== Videography ==
=== Video albums ===
Title	Album details	Peak chart positions								Certifications
Title	Album details	UK	AUS	AUT	GER	NL	JPN	SWE	SWI	Certifications
Live Between the Eyes	Released: 1983; Label: PolyGram Video, Pioneer Artists; Formats: VHS, Beta, LD	—	—	—	—	—	—	—	—	
Japan Tour '84	Released: 1984; Label: Toei Video; Formats: VHS, LD; Japan-only release	—	—	—	—	—	—	—	—	
The Final Cut	Released: 19 June 1986; Label: PolyGram Video; Formats: VHS, LD	—	—	—	—	—	—	—	—	
Live in Munich 1977	Released: 22 August 2006; Label: Eagle Vision; Formats: DVD	3	2	—	—	8	89 (Note: Chart position in 2012.)	2	—	ARIA: Gold
Live Between The Eyes / The Final Cut	Released: September 2006; Label: Universal; Formats: 2×DVD	5	—	—	—	—	—	4	—	
Black Masquerade	Released: 7 August 2013; Label: Eagle Vision; Formats: DVD	5	—	3	—	10	5	2	3	
Live in Japan	Released: 18 November 2015; Label: Ward; Formats: DVD; Japan-only release	—	—	—	—	—	22	—	—	
Monsters of Rock – Live at Donington 1980	Released: 15 April 2016; Label: Eagle Vision; Formats: DVD	3	—	1	54	—	—	1	2	
Memories in Rock – Live in Germany	Released: 18 November 2016; Label: Eagle Vision; Formats: DVD, Blu-ray	5	—	3	11	6	27	2	4	
Memories in Rock II	Released: 4 April 2018; Label: Minstrel Hall Music; Formats: DVD	—	—	—	—	—	—	—	—	
"—" denotes releases that did not chart or were not released in that territory.

=== Music videos ===
Year	Title	Album
1978	"Long Live Rock 'n' Roll"	Long Live Rock 'n' Roll
1978	"L.A. Connection"	Long Live Rock 'n' Roll
1978	"Gates of Babylon"	Long Live Rock 'n' Roll
1979	"Since You Been Gone"	Down to Earth
1979	"All Night Long"	Down to Earth
1981	"I Surrender"	Difficult to Cure
1981	"Can't Happen Here"	Difficult to Cure
1982	"Stone Cold"	Straight Between the Eyes
1982	"Death Alley Driver"	Straight Between the Eyes
1983	"Street of Dreams"	Bent Out of Shape
1984	"Can't Let You Go"	Bent Out of Shape
1995	"Ariel"	Stranger in Us All
