= Catch the Rainbow: The Anthology =

Compilation album by Rainbow
- Released: 18 March 2003
- Recorded: 1975–1986
- Genres: Hard rock, heavy metal
- Length: 157:09
- Label: Polydor

Rainbow compilation albums chronology
All Night Long: An Introduction (2002)	Catch the Rainbow: The Anthology (2003)	Winning Combinations: Deep Purple and Rainbow (2003)

Professional ratings
Review scores
Source	Rating
AllMusic	4/5 stars

Catch the Rainbow: The Anthology is a compilation album by the British hard rock band Rainbow, released in 2003.

== Track listing ==
Disc one
No.	Title	Original release	Length
1.	"Man on the Silver Mountain"	Ritchie Blackmore's Rainbow, 1975	4:37
2.	"Sixteenth Century Greensleeves"	Ritchie Blackmore's Rainbow	3:29
3.	"Catch the Rainbow"	Ritchie Blackmore's Rainbow	6:38
4.	"Tarot Woman"	Rising, 1976	5:59
5.	"Starstruck"	Rising	4:06
6.	"Stargazer"	Rising	8:26
7.	"A Light in the Black"	Rising	8:13
8.	"Mistreated" (live)	On Stage, 1977	13:06
9.	"Long Live Rock 'n' Roll"	Long Live Rock 'n' Roll, 1978	4:23
10.	"Gates of Babylon"	Long Live Rock 'n' Roll	6:46
11.	"Kill the King"	Long Live Rock 'n' Roll	4:28
12.	"Rainbow Eyes"	Long Live Rock 'n' Roll	7:31

Disc two
No.	Title	Original release	Length
1.	"Eyes of the World"	Down to Earth, 1979	6:38
2.	"Since You Been Gone"	Down to Earth	3:17
3.	"All Night Long"	Down to Earth	3:50
4.	"Weiss Heim"	B-side of the single "All Night Long", 1980	5:13
5.	"I Surrender"	Difficult to Cure, 1981	4:01
6.	"Spotlight Kid"	Difficult to Cure	4:53
7.	"Can't Happen Here"	Difficult to Cure	3:08
8.	"Jealous Lover"	B-side of the single "Can't Happen Here", 1981	3:11
9.	"Death Alley Driver"	Straight Between the Eyes, 1982	4:42
10.	"Stone Cold"	Straight Between the Eyes	5:17
11.	"Tearin' Out My Heart"	Straight Between the Eyes	4:04
12.	"Power"	Straight Between the Eyes	4:26
13.	"Can't Let You Go"	Bent Out of Shape, 1983	4:20
14.	"Desperate Heart"	Bent Out of Shape	4:03
15.	"Street of Dreams"	Bent Out of Shape	4:26
16.	"Difficult to Cure" (live)	Finyl Vinyl, 1986	11:14

== Charts ==
Chart (2004)	Peak position
Finnish Albums (Suomen virallinen lista)	26

Chart (2009)	Peak position
UK Rock & Metal Albums (Official Charts)	24

Chart (2026)	Peak position
Greek Albums (IFPI)	23

== Certifications ==
Certifications for Catch the Rainbow: The Anthology
Region	Certification	Certified units/sales
United Kingdom (BPI)	Silver	60,000^{‡}
^{‡} Sales+streaming figures based on certification alone.
