= List of Rainbow band members =

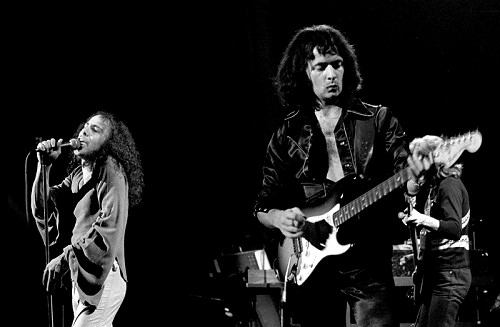
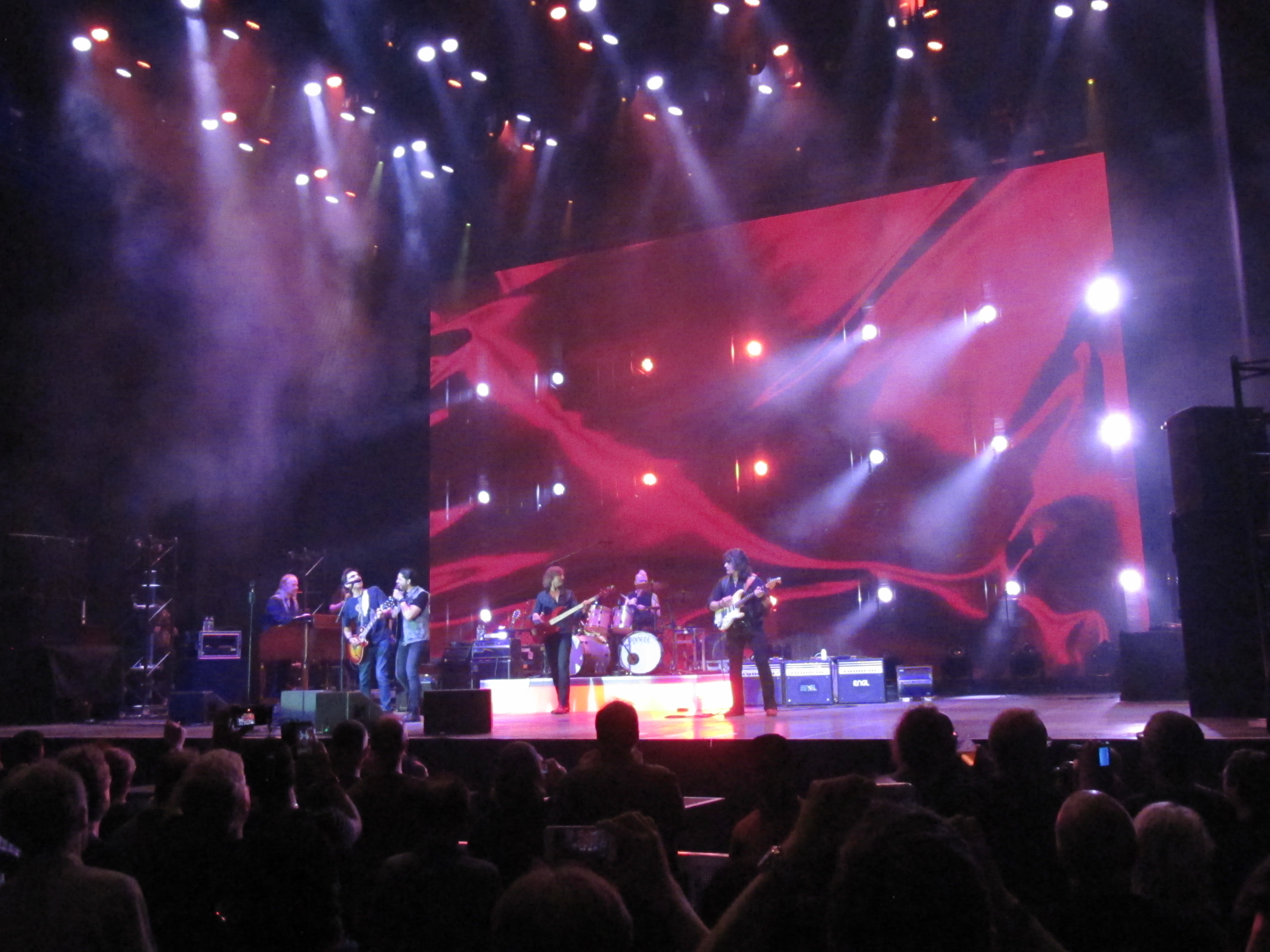
Two line-ups of Rainbow performing in 1977 and 2017

Rainbow are an English-American hard rock band originally from Hertford, Hertfordshire. Formed in January 1975 by then-Deep Purple guitarist Ritchie Blackmore, the original lineup of the group also included former Elf members Ronnie James Dio (lead vocals), Craig Gruber (bass), Gary Driscoll (drums) and Micky Lee Soule (keyboards), who recorded and released the self-titled album Ritchie Blackmore's Rainbow that year. The most recent line-up consisted of Blackmore (the sole continuous member), backing vocalist Candice Night (since 1994), singer Ronnie Romero, bassist Bob Nouveau, drummer David Keith and keyboardist Jens Johansson (all since 2015).

== History ==
After the release of the band’s debut album, Blackmore replaced Gruber, Driscoll and Soule in September 1975, with Jimmy Bain, Cozy Powell and Tony Carey, respectively. This lineup would release the studio album Rising and the live album On Stage, before Bain and Carey were sacked by Blackmore, on 3 January 1977. Long Live Rock 'n' Roll, released in 1978, featured bassist Bob Daisley and keyboardist David Stone, in addition to Powell.

After the release of Long Live Rock 'n' Roll, Dio left due to disagreements with Blackmore. Graham Bonnet replaced Dio for 1979's Down to Earth, which also saw the addition of bassist Roger Glover and keyboardist Don Airey. Bonnet left after the album's release and was replaced by Joe Lynn Turner, while Powell also left the group to be replaced by Bobby Rondinelli; both new members played on Difficult to Cure. Keyboardist David Rosenthal replaced Airey for 1982's Straight Between the Eyes, while 1983's Bent Out of Shape, featured drummer Chuck Burgi replacing Rondinelli. Rainbow disbanded for the first time in 1984.

After Blackmore left Deep Purple for the second time in 1993, Rainbow reformed with vocalist Doogie White, bassist Greg Smith, drummer John O'Reilly and keyboardist Paul Morris, releasing the album Stranger in Us All in 1995. The band's return was short-lived, however, as they broke up again in 1997, when Blackmore shifted focus to Blackmore's Night. In November 2015, it was revealed that Blackmore would be returning to the Rainbow moniker for a number of shows in 2016 with vocalist Ronnie Romero, bassist Bob Nouveau (Bob Curiano), drummer David Keith and keyboardist Jens Johansson. This lineup remained active until 2019, releasing three new live albums and a number of singles, before Romero confirmed his departure from the group in October 2023.

== Members ==
=== Current ===
Image	Name	Years active	Instruments	Release contributions
	Ritchie Blackmore	1975–1984; 1993–1997; 2015–present	guitars; bass (studio 1977)	all Rainbow releases
	Bob Nouveau (Bob Curiano)	2015–present	bass; backing vocals	Memories in Rock: Live in Germany (2016); "Land of Hope and Glory" (2017); "I Surrender" (2017); Live in Birmingham 2016 (2017); Memories in Rock II Live (2018); "Black Sheep of the Family" (2019); "The Storm" (2019)
	David Keith	2015–present	drums	Memories in Rock: Live in Germany (2016); "Land of Hope and Glory" (2017); "I Surrender" (2017); Live in Birmingham 2016 (2017); Memories in Rock II Live (2018); "Black Sheep of the Family" (2019); "The Storm" (2019)
	Jens Johansson	2015–present	keyboards	Memories in Rock: Live in Germany (2016); "Land of Hope and Glory" (2017); "I Surrender" (2017); Live in Birmingham 2016 (2017); Memories in Rock II Live (2018); "Black Sheep of the Family" (2019); "The Storm" (2019)

=== Former ===
Image	Name	Years active	Instruments	Release contributions
	Ronnie James Dio (Ronald Padavona)	1975–1979 (died 2010)	lead and backing vocals	all Rainbow releases from Ritchie Blackmore's Rainbow (1975) to Long Live Rock 'n' Roll (1978); Live in Germany 1976 (1990); Deutschland Tournee 1976 (2006); Live in Munich 1977 (2006); Finyl Vinyl (1986)
	Craig Gruber	1975; 1977 (died 2015)	bass	Ritchie Blackmore's Rainbow (1975)
	Micky Lee Soule	1975	keyboards	Ritchie Blackmore's Rainbow (1975)
	Gary Driscoll	1975 (died 1987)	drums	Ritchie Blackmore's Rainbow (1975)
	Cozy Powell (Colin Flooks)	1975–1980 (died 1998)	drums	all Rainbow releases from Rising (1976) to Down to Earth (1979); Live in Germany 1976 (1990); Deutschland Tournee 1976 (2006); Live in Munich 1977 (2006); Denver 1979: Down to Earth Tour (2015); Long Island 1979: Down to Earth Tour (2015); Down to Earth Tour 1979 (Box set) (2015); Monsters of Rock - Live at Donington 1980 (2016); Finyl Vinyl (1986)
	Jimmy Bain	1975–1977 (died 2016)	bass; backing vocals	Rising (1976); On Stage (1977); Live in Germany 1976 (1990); Deutschland Tournee 1976 (2006)
	Tony Carey	1975–1977	keyboards	Rising (1976); On Stage (1977); Live in Germany 1976 (1990); Deutschland Tournee 1976 (2006)
	David Stone (Michael Stoyanoff)	1977–1978	keyboards	Long Live Rock 'n' Roll (1978); Live in Munich 1977 (2006); Finyl Vinyl (1986)
	Mark Clarke	1977	bass; backing vocals	none
	Bob Daisley	1977–1978	bass; backing vocals	Long Live Rock 'n' Roll (1978); Live in Munich 1977 (2006); Finyl Vinyl (1986)
	Jack Green	1978 (died 2024)	bass; backing vocals	none
	Roger Glover	1979–1984	bass; backing vocals; percussion (studio, 1983)	all Rainbow releases from Down to Earth (1979) to Bent Out of Shape (1983), and from Denver 1979: Down to Earth Tour (2015) to Boston 1981 (2016); Finyl Vinyl (1986); Live Between The Eyes (1982)
	Don Airey	1979–1981	keyboards; backing vocals	Down to Earth (1979); Difficult to Cure (1981); Denver 1979: Down to Earth Tour (2015); Long Island 1979: Down to Earth Tour (2015); Monsters of Rock: Live at Donington 1980 (2016); Boston 1981 (2016); Down to Earth Tour 1979 (Box set) (2015); Finyl Vinyl (1986)
	Graham Bonnet	1979–1980	lead vocals	Down to Earth (1979); Denver 1979: Down to Earth Tour (2015); Long Island 1979: Down to Earth Tour (2015); Monsters of Rock: Live at Donington 1980 (2016); Down to Earth Tour 1979 (Box set) (2015); Finyl Vinyl (1986)
	Joe Lynn Turner (Joseph Linquito)	1980–1984	lead vocals	all Rainbow releases from Difficult to Cure (1981) to Bent Out of Shape (1983); Live in Japan (2015); Boston 1981 (2016); Finyl Vinyl (1986); Live Between the Eyes (1982)
	Bobby Rondinelli	1980–1983	drums	Difficult to Cure (1981); Straight Between the Eyes (1982); Boston 1981 (2016); Finyl Vinyl (1986); Live Between the Eyes (1982)
	David Rosenthal	1981–1984	keyboards; backing vocals	Straight Between the Eyes (1982); Bent Out of Shape (1983); Live in Japan (2015); Finyl Vinyl (1986); Live Between the Eyes (1982)
	Chuck Burgi	1983–1984; 1995–1996	drums	Bent Out of Shape (1983); Black Masquerade (2013); Live in Japan (2015); Finyl Vinyl (1986)
	Paul Morris	1993–1997	keyboards	Stranger in Us All (1995); Black Masquerade (2013)
	Greg Smith	1993–1997	bass; backing vocals	Stranger in Us All (1995); Black Masquerade (2013)
	Doogie White (Douglas White)	1993–1997	lead vocals	Stranger in Us All (1995); Black Masquerade (2013)
	John O'Reilly	1993–1995	drums	Stranger in Us All (1995)
	John Miceli	1997	drums	none
	Ronnie Romero	2015–2023	lead vocals	Memories in Rock: Live in Germany (2016); "Land of Hope and Glory" (2017); "I Surrender" (2017); Live in Birmingham 2016 (2017); Memories in Rock II Live (2018); "Black Sheep of the Family" (2019); "The Storm" (2019)

=== Touring ===
Image	Name	Years active	Instruments	Release contributions	Details
	Lin Robinson	1981–1984	backing vocals	Live Between the Eyes (1982); Live in Japan (2015); Finyl Vinyl (1986); Boston 1981 (2016)	Robinson and Beale toured with Rainbow from the Difficult to Cure tour until the group disbanded in 1984.
	Dee Beale	1981–1984	backing vocals	Live Between the Eyes (1982); Live in Japan (2015); Finyl Vinyl (1986); Boston 1981 (2016)	Robinson and Beale toured with Rainbow from the Difficult to Cure tour until the group disbanded in 1984.
	Candice Night	1994–1997; 2015–present	backing vocals	Stranger in Us All (1995); Memories in Rock: Live in Germany (2016); Land of Hope and Glory (2017); "I Surrender" (2017); Live in Birmingham 2016 (2017); Memories in Rock II Live (2018); "Black Sheep of the Family" (2019); "The Storm" (2019)	Night joined the band on tour in 1994, and also returned in 2015.
	Lady Lynn (Christina Lynn Skleros)	2015–present	backing vocals	Memories in Rock - Live in Germany (2016); Live in Birmingham 2016 (2017); Memories in Rock II (2018)	Skleros, a member of Blackmore and Night's other group Blackmore's Night, joined Rainbow on tour in 2015.

== Timeline ==
Recording Timeline

Role	Album							
Role	Ritchie Blackmore's Rainbow (1975)	Rising (1976)	Long Live Rock 'n' Roll (1978)	Down to Earth (1979)	Difficult to Cure (1981)	Straight Between the Eyes (1982)	Bent Out of Shape (1983)	Stranger in Us All (1995)
Lead vocals	Ronnie James Dio	Ronnie James Dio	Ronnie James Dio	Graham Bonnet	Joe Lynn Turner	Joe Lynn Turner	Joe Lynn Turner	Doogie White
Guitar	Ritchie Blackmore	Ritchie Blackmore	Ritchie Blackmore	Ritchie Blackmore	Ritchie Blackmore	Ritchie Blackmore	Ritchie Blackmore	Ritchie Blackmore
Bass guitar	Craig Gruber	Jimmy Bain	Ritchie Blackmore; Mark Clarke; Bob Daisley	Roger Glover	Roger Glover	Roger Glover	Roger Glover	Greg Smith
Keyboards	Micky Lee Soule	Tony Carey	Tony Carey; David Stone	Don Airey	Don Airey	David Rosenthal	David Rosenthal	Paul Morris
Drums	Gary Driscoll	Cozy Powell	Cozy Powell	Cozy Powell	Bobby Rondinelli	Bobby Rondinelli	Chuck Burgi	John O'Reilly
Backing vocals	Ronnie James Dio	none	none	Roger Glover; Don Airey	Joe Lynn Turner	none	none	Candice Night

== Lineups ==
Period	Members	Releases
February – July 1975	Ronnie James Dio – vocals; Ritchie Blackmore – guitars; Craig Gruber – bass; Micky Lee Soule – keyboards; Gary Driscoll – drums	Ritchie Blackmore's Rainbow (1975)
August 1975 – January 1977	Ronnie James Dio – lead vocals; Ritchie Blackmore – guitars; Jimmy Bain – bass, backing vocals; Tony Carey – keyboards; Cozy Powell – drums	Rising (1976); On Stage (1977)
January – February 1977	Ronnie James Dio – vocals; Ritchie Blackmore – guitars; Craig Gruber – bass; Tony Carey – keyboards; Cozy Powell – drums	none
February – May 1977	Ronnie James Dio – lead vocals; Ritchie Blackmore – guitars; Mark Clarke – bass, backing vocals; Tony Carey – keyboards; Cozy Powell – drums	none
May – September 1977	Ronnie James Dio – vocals; Ritchie Blackmore – guitars, bass; Tony Carey – keyboards; Cozy Powell – drums	none
September 1977 –September 1978	Ronnie James Dio – lead vocals; Ritchie Blackmore – guitars; Bob Daisley – bass, backing vocals; David Stone – keyboards; Cozy Powell – drums	Long Live Rock 'n' Roll (1978); Live in Munich 1977 (2006)
October 1978 - January 1979	Ronnie James Dio – lead vocals; Ritchie Blackmore – guitars; Jack Green – bass, backing vocals; David Stone – keyboards; Cozy Powell – drums	none
March 1979 – August 1980	Graham Bonnet – lead vocals; Ritchie Blackmore – guitars; Roger Glover – bass, backing vocals; Don Airey – keyboards, backing vocals; Cozy Powell – drums	Down to Earth (1979); Denver 1979: Down to Earth Tour (2015); Long Island 1979: Down to Earth Tour (2015); Down to Earth Tour 1979 (Box set) (2015)
October 1980 – September 1981	Joe Lynn Turner – lead vocals; Ritchie Blackmore – guitars; Roger Glover – bass, backing vocals; Don Airey – keyboards, backing vocals; Bobby Rondinelli – drums	Difficult to Cure (1981); Jealous Lover (1981); Boston 1981 (2016)
October 1981 – June 1983	Joe Lynn Turner – lead vocals; Ritchie Blackmore – guitars; Roger Glover – bass, backing vocals; David Rosenthal – keyboards; Bobby Rondinelli – drums	Straight Between the Eyes (1982)
August 1983 – March 1984	Joe Lynn Turner – lead vocals; Ritchie Blackmore – guitars; Roger Glover – bass, backing vocals; David Rosenthal – keyboards; Chuck Burgi – drums	Bent Out of Shape (1983); Live in Japan (2015)
Band inactive March 1984 – August 1994
August 1994 – September 1995	Doogie White – lead vocals; Ritchie Blackmore – guitars; Greg Smith – bass, backing vocals; Paul Morris – keyboards; John O'Reilly – drums; Candice Night – backing vocals	Stranger in Us All (1995)
September 1995 – December 1996	Doogie White – lead vocals; Ritchie Blackmore – guitars; Greg Smith – bass, backing vocals; Paul Morris – keyboards; Chuck Burgi – drums; Candice Night – backing vocals	Black Masquerade (2013)
January – May 1997	Doogie White – lead vocals; Ritchie Blackmore – guitars; Greg Smith – bass, backing vocals; Paul Morris – keyboards; John Miceli – drums; Candice Night – backing vocals	none
Band inactive May 1997 – November 2015
November 2015 – October 2023	Ronnie Romero – lead vocals; Ritchie Blackmore – guitars; Bob Nouveau – bass, backing vocals; Jens Johansson – keyboards; David Keith – drums; Candice Night – backing vocals	Memories in Rock: Live in Germany (2016); Land of Hope and Glory (2017); "I Surrender" (2017); Live in Birmingham 2016 (2017); Memories in Rock II Live (2018); "Black Sheep of the Family" (2019); "The Storm" (2019)
October 2023 – present	Ritchie Blackmore – guitars; Bob Nouveau – bass, backing vocals; Jens Johansson – keyboards; David Keith – drums; Candice Night – backing vocals	none
