= The Best of Rainbow =

- Cover design by Hipgnosis

Greatest hits album by Rainbow
- Released: 13 November 1981
- Recorded: 1975–1981
- Genre: Hard rock, heavy metal
- Length: 82:11
- Label: Polydor
- Producer: Martin Birch, Roger Glover

Rainbow compilation albums chronology
The Best of Rainbow (1981)	The Very Best of Rainbow (1997)

Professional ratings
Review scores
Source	Rating
AllMusic	2.5/5 stars

The Best of Rainbow is the first compilation album from British hard rock group Rainbow, released in 1981.

This compilation album is slightly different from the similarly titled album from 1980, which was released only in Japan, and features mostly previously released studio cuts, taken from the five studio albums Rainbow had released at that point. However, "Jealous Lover", the first song written by Blackmore and Turner, had been available only as a B-side in Europe (to "Can't Happen Here") and on the Jealous Lover EP in the United States.

The original vinyl-release was a 2-LP set, in a gatefold-sleeve which contained photos of the band during its various incarnations, and reached No. 14 in the UK Albums Chart in 1981. As of 2019, this compilation album has never been released in the United States.

The photograph on the cover was taken at Zaanse Schans.

== Track listing ==
Side one
No.	Title	Writer(s)	Original release	Length
1.	"All Night Long"	Ritchie Blackmore, Roger Glover	Down to Earth (1979)	3:53
2.	"Man on the Silver Mountain"	Blackmore, Ronnie James Dio	Ritchie Blackmore's Rainbow (1975)	4:39
3.	"Lost in Hollywood"	Blackmore, Glover, Cozy Powell	Down to Earth	4:53
4.	"Jealous Lover"	Blackmore, Joe Lynn Turner	B-side of the single "Can't Happen Here" (1981)	3:10
5.	"Long Live Rock 'n' Roll"	Blackmore, Dio	Long Live Rock 'n' Roll (1978)	4:23

Side two
No.	Title	Writer(s)	Original release	Length
6.	"Stargazer"	Blackmore, Dio	Rising (1976)	8:26
7.	"Kill the King"	Blackmore, Dio, Powell	Long Live Rock 'n' Roll	4:29
8.	"A Light in the Black"	Blackmore, Dio	Rising	8:12

Side three
No.	Title	Writer(s)	Original release	Length
9.	"Since You Been Gone"	Russ Ballard	Down to Earth	3:20
10.	"Sixteenth Century Greensleeves"	Blackmore, Dio	Ritchie Blackmore's Rainbow	3:31
11.	"Catch the Rainbow"	Blackmore, Dio	Ritchie Blackmore's Rainbow	6:36
12.	"Eyes of the World"	Blackmore, Glover	Down to Earth	6:42

Side four
No.	Title	Writer(s)	Original release	Length
13.	"I Surrender"	Ballard	Difficult to Cure (1981)	4:03
14.	"Gates of Babylon"	Blackmore, Dio	Long Live Rock 'n' Roll	6:49
15.	"Can't Happen Here"	Blackmore, Glover	Difficult to Cure	4:59
16.	"Starstruck"	Blackmore, Dio	Rising	4:06

== Personnel ==
- Ritchie Blackmore – guitars, bass on track 5
- Ronnie James Dio – vocals: tracks 2, 5–8, 10, 11, 14, 16
- Graham Bonnet – vocals: tracks 1, 3, 9, 12
- Joe Lynn Turner – vocals: tracks 4, 13, 15
- Micky Lee Soule – keyboards: tracks 2, 10, 11
- Tony Carey – keyboards: tracks 6, 8, 16
- David Stone – keyboards: tracks 7, 14
- Don Airey – keyboards: tracks 1, 3, 4, 9, 12, 13, 15
- Craig Gruber – bass: tracks 2, 10, 11
- Jimmy Bain – bass: tracks 6, 8, 16
- Bob Daisley – bass: tracks 7, 14
- Roger Glover – bass: tracks 1, 3, 4, 9, 12, 13, 15
- Gary Driscoll – drums: tracks 2, 10, 11
- Cozy Powell – drums: tracks 1, 3, 5–9, 12, 14, 16
- Bobby Rondinelli – drums: tracks 4, 13, 15
- Roger Glover – producer: tracks 1, 3, 4, 9, 12, 13, 15
- Blackmore/Birch/Dio – producers: tracks 2, 10, 11
- Martin Birch – producer: tracks 5–8, 14, 16

== Charts ==
Chart (1981)	Peak position
Japanese Albums (Oricon)	48
UK Albums (OCC)	14

== Certifications ==
Region	Certification	Certified units/sales
United Kingdom (BPI)	Gold	100,000^{^}
^{^} Shipments figures based on certification alone.
