= Catch the Rainbow =

Catch the Rainbow may refer to:

- Catch the Rainbow: The Anthology, an album by Rainbow
- "Catch the Rainbow" (Rainbow song), 1975
- "Catch the Rainbow" (Misia song), 2008
