= Jealous Lover =

Jealous Lover EP
- Cover art by Hipgnosis

EP by Rainbow
- Released: 19 October 1981
- Recorded: Orpheum Theatre, Minneapolis, April 1981; Sweet Silence Studios, Copenhagen, Denmark, 1980
- Genre: Hard rock
- Length: 17:23
- Label: Polydor
- Producer: Roger Glover

Rainbow chronology
Difficult to Cure (1981)	Jealous Lover EP (1981)	Straight Between the Eyes (1982)

Jealous Lover is a four track, 12" EP released by the British hard rock band Rainbow in the USA in 1981. The EP reached No. 147 on Billboard's Top 200 albums chart. Tracks include two songs previously unavailable in the US, and two songs from their full-length album Difficult to Cure of the same year. The cover art featured the same Hipgnosis photography used for the album, with a different background.

The title song "Jealous Lover" received significant airplay on Album-oriented rock radio stations in the US, reaching No. 13 on Billboard's Rock Albums & Top Tracks chart, which tracked AOR airplay. The song had previously been issued as a b-side to "Can't Happen Here" in the UK and elsewhere, but at the time was not available on any full-length album. The second track, "Weiss Heim" was previously only available as the b-side to the UK single "All Night Long", and also never before issued in the USA. Both "Jealous Lover" and "Weiss Heim" were included on the Finyl Vinyl album in 1986.

Both tracks on side two, "Can't Happen Here" and "I Surrender" had been issued as singles and included on the album Difficult to Cure.

"I Surrender" was notable as the track not composed by the band. Rather it was written by Russ Ballard, formerly of Argent and at the time enjoying moderate success as a songwriter for other artists. Ballard had also written the hit single "Since You Been Gone" previously recorded by Rainbow.

The Jealous Lover EP has never been issued on compact disc, though all of the songs are available on CD as part of Difficult to Cure or Finyl Vinyl.

== Tracks ==
1. "Jealous Lover" (Joe Lynn Turner, Ritchie Blackmore) - 3:10
2. "Weiss Heim" (Blackmore) - 5:10
3. "Can't Happen Here" (Blackmore, Roger Glover) - 5:02
4. "I Surrender" (Russ Ballard) - 4:01
