= Street of Dreams (Rainbow song) =

Single by Rainbow

from the album Bent Out of Shape
- B-side: "Anybody There", "Power" (live)
- Released: 19 August 1983
- Genre: Soft rock
- Length: 4:28
- Label: Polydor, Mercury Records (original US)
- Songwriters: Ritchie Blackmore, Joe Lynn Turner
- Producer: Roger Glover

Rainbow singles chronology
"Stone Cold" (1982)	"Street of Dreams" (1983)	"Can't Let You Go" (1983)

Street of Dreams is a song by the English rock band Rainbow. The song was the first single from the band's album Bent Out of Shape, the band's follow up to their previous album, Straight Between the Eyes and the single "Stone Cold". Ritchie Blackmore has stated that "Street of Dreams" is one of his favourite Rainbow songs.

== Music video ==
A music video was also made for the song, directed by Storm Thorgerson. The video opens with a woman being gagged, strapped to a chair and locked in a closet by a psychiatrist. The psychiatrist closes the closet door, before he takes in the woman's boyfriend, named Mark, as a patient. Mark tells the psychiatrist about a dream he's been having. In the dream, there's a street full of beds, and a rock-and-roll band plays a song in a basement, while Mark is by a lake, seeing his girlfriend being kidnapped — and his girlfriend has disappeared in real life. The evil psychiatrist suggests that he hypnotize Mark, who in turn agrees and soon falls asleep. The song starts playing, while we see everything that Mark described. Soon, Mark starts waking up upon hearing the sound of his girlfriend kicking the closet door. Mark pushes the psychiatrist aside and frees his girlfriend. As the two flee, the psychiatrist tries to stop them, but Mark knocks him out, and in the last scene, we see the psychiatrist falling into the same lake as in Mark's dream.

According to Blackmore's biography on his official website, the music video for "Street of Dreams" was banned by MTV for its supposedly controversial hypnotic video clip. This, however, was only after the video received some airplay and Dr. Thomas Radecki of the National Coalition on Television Violence criticized MTV for airing it.

== Personnel ==
- Ritchie Blackmore - guitars
- David Rosenthal - keyboards
- Roger Glover - bass, percussion
- Chuck Burgi - drums
- Joe Lynn Turner - vocals

== Chart performance ==
Chart (1983–84)	Peak position
UK Singles (The Official Charts Company)	52
US Billboard Hot 100	60
US Billboard Mainstream Rock Chart	2
