= Finyl Vinyl =

Live album by Rainbow
- Released: 24 February 1986
- Recorded: 1978–1984
- Genre: Hard rock, heavy metal
- Length: 79:52; 84:46 (cassette)
- Label: Polydor; Mercury (North America)
- Producer: Roger Glover, Ritchie Blackmore

Rainbow live albums chronology
On Stage (1977)	Finyl Vinyl (1986)	Live in Germany (1990)

Professional ratings
Review scores
Source	Rating
AllMusic	3/5 stars
Collector's Guide to Heavy Metal	7/10
Kerrang!	4.5/5 stars

Finyl Vinyl is a live album by the British hard rock band Rainbow and was released in 1986, after the band had already disbanded in 1984. It includes live recordings spanning 1978 to 1984, along with three studio B-sides.

== Notes ==
- The cover photograph of Ritchie Blackmore was taken by Ross Halfin after a concert at the Deutschlandhalle in Berlin in November 1982. The person all the way in the background is Don Airey running towards the stage trying to get in the shot. (as told by Don Airey himself in 2005)
- The LP notes mistakenly credit drums on "Weiss Heim" to Bobby Rondinelli, when in fact they were performed by Cozy Powell.
- The instrumental "Difficult to Cure" is taken from the final Japanese Rainbow date in 1984 and features a full orchestral accompaniment. The guitar solo was re-recorded and differs from the video release.
- The song "Man on the Silver Mountain" features guitar overdubs.
- The song "Can't Happen Here" has wrong location and date in the booklet. It was actually recorded at "The Orpheum Theatre" in Boston, MA, USA on May 7, 1981.
- The original double vinyl release omitted "Street of Dreams", although it was included on the cassette version before "Jealous Lover". The first CD issue, a single disc, omitted both "Street of Dreams" and "Tearin' Out My Heart". These were restored on the 2CD remastered edition of 1999, which features different lengths for several tracks along with the original artwork.

== Track listing ==
Side one
No.	Title	Writer(s)	Recorded	Length
1.	"Spotlight Kid"	Ritchie Blackmore, Roger Glover	live at the Budokan, Tokyo, Japan, March, 1984	5:00
2.	"I Surrender"	Russ Ballard	live at the Budokan, Tokyo, Japan, March, 1984	5:45
3.	"Miss Mistreated"	Blackmore, David Rosenthal, Joe Lynn Turner	live at the Budokan, Tokyo, Japan, March, 1984	4:21

Side two
No.	Title	Writer(s)	Recorded	Length
4.	"Jealous Lover"	Blackmore, Turner	in studio, B-side of "Can't Happen Here" single, 1981	3:10
5.	"Can't Happen Here"	Blackmore, Glover	live at the Memorial Coliseum, Uniondale, New York, 1981	4:15
6.	"Tearin' Out My Heart"	Blackmore, Glover, Turner	live at The Convention Center, San Antonio, Texas, August 18, 1982	8:04
7.	"Since You Been Gone"	Ballard	live at Monsters of Rock Festival, Castle Donington, England, August 16, 1980	3:40
8.	"Bad Girl"	Blackmore, Glover	in studio, B-side of "Since You Been Gone" single, 1979	4:48

Side three
No.	Title	Writer(s)	Recorded	Length
9.	"Difficult to Cure" (instrumental)	Ludwig van Beethoven, arrangement by Blackmore, Glover, Don Airey, orchestral arrangement by David Rosenthal	live at the Budokan, Tokyo, Japan, March, 1984	11:15
10.	"Stone Cold"	Blackmore, Glover, Turner	live at The Convention Center, San Antonio, Texas, August 18, 1982	4:30
11.	"Power"	Blackmore, Glover, Turner	live at The Convention Center, San Antonio, Texas, August 18, 1982	4:22

Side four
No.	Title	Writer(s)	Recorded	Length
12.	"Man on the Silver Mountain"	Blackmore, Ronnie James Dio	live at The Omni, Atlanta, Georgia, June 24, 1978	8:20
13.	"Long Live Rock 'n' Roll"	Blackmore, Dio	live at The Omni, Atlanta, Georgia, June 24, 1978	7:12
14.	"Weiss Heim" (instrumental)	Blackmore	in studio, B-side of "All Night Long" single, 1980	5:10

Extra track in the cassette edition
No.	Title	Writer(s)	Recorded	Length
4.	"Street of Dreams"	Blackmore, Turner	live at the Budokan, Tokyo, Japan, March, 1984	4:54

== Personnel ==
- Guitars: Ritchie Blackmore
- Vocals: Joe Lynn Turner (tracks 1–6, 10–11, 15), Graham Bonnet (tracks 7–8), Ronnie James Dio (tracks 12–13)
- Bass: Roger Glover (all tracks except 12–13), Bob Daisley (tracks 12–13)
- Drums: Chuck Burgi (tracks 1–3, 9, 15), Bobby Rondinelli (tracks 4–6, 10–11), Cozy Powell (tracks 7–8, 12–14)
- Keyboards: David Rosenthal (tracks 1–3, 6, 9–11, 15), Don Airey (tracks 4–5, 7–8, 14), David Stone (tracks 12–13)
- Backing vocals: Lynn Robinson (tracks 1–5, 8–9, 15) and Dee Beale (tracks 4–5, 10–11)

== Charts ==
Chart (1986)	Peak position
Finnish Albums (The Official Finnish Charts)	35
Japanese Albums (Oricon)	20
Swedish Albums (Sverigetopplistan)	25
UK Albums (OCC)	31
US Billboard 200	87
