= Stargazer (Rainbow song) =

1976 song by Rainbow

Song by Rainbow

from the album Rising
- Released: 17 May 1976
- Recorded: February 1976
- Genre: Heavy metal; power metal
- Length: 8:26
- Label: Polydor; Oyster
- Songwriters: Ritchie Blackmore; Ronnie James Dio
- Producer: Martin Birch

Audio
- "Stargazer" on YouTube

"Stargazer" is a song by the British rock supergroup Rainbow, released as fifth track from the band's second studio album Rising (1976). It is an epic song narrating the story of a powerful wizard whose attempt to fly by constructing a mystical tower to the stars leads to the enslavement of vast numbers of people. "Stargazer" is notable for its musical complexity, with the guitar, lyrics, and drum intro cited as significant examples of the talents of guitarist Ritchie Blackmore, singer Ronnie James Dio, and drummer Cozy Powell.

== Description ==
The epic-length rock track, with symphonic influences, starts with a short drum solo by Cozy Powell, a "great drumming moment" frequently cited as an example of his skills. It features the Munich Philharmonic Orchestra, a Vako Orchestron, and what Ritchie Blackmore called "a string thing all playing this half-Turkish Scale".

"We went into the studio with a 28-piece orchestra…" recalled Blackmore. "But the backing was too flowery, so we kept taking out parts and making it less and less complicated. The orchestra was getting angry for having to play it so many times. And there was a very fine gypsy violinist who decided to play after the orchestra had finished, but the tape spool ended. The poor guy was frantically playing and we weren't recording him, which was very frustrating for all involved."

Blackmore's solo, after the second verse, is in B Phrygian dominant scale, and is cited as "one of his best".

The song has been called a "morality tale", from – according to lyricist Ronnie James Dio – the standpoint of a "slave in Egyptian times". They relate the story of the Wizard, an astronomer who becomes "obsessed with the idea of flying" and enslaves a vast army to build a tower from which he can take off and fly. Building the tower in harsh conditions ("In the heat and rain, with whips and chains; /just to see him fly, so many die"), the people hope for the day when their misery ends. In the end, the wizard climbs to the top of the tower but, instead of flying, falls and dies: "No sound as he falls instead of rising / Time standing still, then there's blood on the sand." According to Dio, the next song, "A Light in the Black", continues the story of the people, who have lost all purpose after the Wizard's death "until they see the light in the dark".

"Stargazer" was the first song to be played by different bands at the UK's Monsters of Rock festival: by Rainbow in 1980 and – in abbreviated form – by Dio in 1983.

== Critical legacy ==
AllMusic and MusicHound describe the song as one of Rainbow's classics, AllMusic calling it a "bombastic, strings-enriched epic". Vincent DeMasi, transcribing part of Blackmore's solo as an example of his taste for "classical drama" with a "Middle Eastern flavor", calls the song an "operatic blockbuster". Jeff Perkins argues that the "incredible epic", one of the band's highlights, derives its strength from Blackmore's guitar playing, Dio's lyrics and vocals, and Powell's drumming. Andy DiGelsomina, composer for the neo-operatic metal project Lyraka, argued for both Wagnerian and existentialist interpretations of the lyrics. A poll held by Gibson ranked the song the 17th greatest heavy metal song of all time.

In a 2023 article ranking "Stargazer" 14th among "The 100 Greatest Heavy Metal Songs of All Time," Rolling Stone called Dio's performance on the song "the man’s finest vocal performance on record."

== Alternate versions ==
"Stargazer (Rough Mix)", an early mix from the 2011 Deluxe Edition of Rising, starts with a keyboard intro played by Tony Carey and has a length of 9:08.

== Personnel ==
=== Rainbow ===
- Ritchie Blackmore – lead and rhythm guitars
- Ronnie James Dio – lead vocals
- Cozy Powell – drums, percussion
- Jimmy Bain – bass
- Tony Carey – keyboards

Additional personnel

- Munich Philharmonic Orchestra – strings section, french horn
- Fritz Sonnleitner – concert master
- Rainer Pietsch – conductor
