= David Rosenthal (musician) =

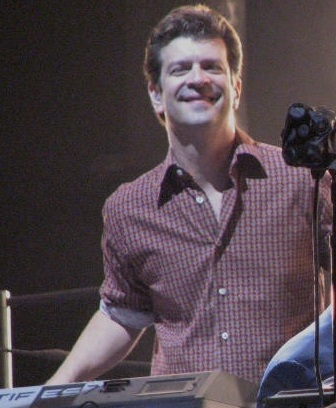
- Rosenthal in 2006

Background information
- Also known as: Dave Rosenthal
- Born: January 1, 1961 (age 65)
- Genres: Pop; rock; progressive rock; heavy metal
- Occupations: Musician; musical director; synth programmer; orchestrator; songwriter; producer
- Instrument: Keyboards
- Years active: 1981–present
- Member of: Billy Joel Band
- Formerly of: Rainbow; Red Dawn
- Website: www.davidrosenthal.com

David Rosenthal (born January 1, 1961) is an American keyboardist, musical director, music producer, synthesizer programmer, orchestrator, and songwriter, mostly known for working with the hard rock band Rainbow and Billy Joel. Rosenthal has been nominated for three Grammy Awards, and in addition to Rainbow and Joel, has worked with Bruce Springsteen, Enrique Iglesias, Robert Palmer, Steve Vai, Cyndi Lauper, Whitesnake, Little Steven, and Happy the Man.

== Biography ==
=== Early life (1961–1980) ===
Rosenthal grew up in Edison, New Jersey, and is the only musician in his family. He began taking piano lessons at the age of seven and playing in cover bands when he was twelve. His high school band Crystal Visions won Best Instrumental Group in a 1978 statewide Talent Expo by performing Emerson, Lake & Palmer's "Hoedown" at the Garden State Arts Center in Holmdel, New Jersey (now called the PNC Bank Arts Center). Rosenthal's early influences included Keith Emerson, Rick Wakeman, Ken Hensley, Chick Corea, Kit Watkins, and Tomita. Rosenthal attended Berklee College of Music, where he played in a band with Steve Vai called Morning Thunder, and graduated in 1981.

=== Rainbow (1981–1984) ===
In October 1981, shortly after graduating from Berklee, Rosenthal replaced Don Airey in Rainbow, after successfully auditioning amongst 50 other hopefuls. He went on to perform on 1982's Straight Between the Eyes and 1983's Bent Out of Shape. Rosenthal co-wrote the songs "Miss Mistreated" (from Straight Between the Eyes), and "Can't Let You Go" and "Fire Dance" (from Bent Out of Shape), and appeared in the videos for "Stone Cold", "Death Alley Driver", "Street of Dreams", and "Can't Let You Go". He appears in Rainbow's full-length concert videos Live Between the Eyes (1982) and Japan Tour '84 (the latter of which features Rosenthal's orchestration, when the band performed live with an orchestra at the Budokan in Tokyo). Rosenthal also appears on several tracks on the 1986 live recording, Finyl Vinyl.

=== Little Steven, Hammerhead (1984–1985) ===
After the initial breakup of Rainbow, Rosenthal went on to work with a variety of other artists, including a world tour with Little Steven and the Disciples of Soul (on the Voice of America tour in 1984). In 1985, he produced the debut album for Hammerhead, a Dutch band, which featured Ian Parry (Mono Pacific with Zak Starkey, Airrace with Jason Bonham) on vocals and Joe Franco (Twisted Sister, The Good Rats) on drums. The band broke up prior to the album's release, however the album entitled Heart Made of Steel was eventually released in 2000.

=== Cyndi Lauper (1986–1987) ===
From 1986 to 1987, Rosenthal played keyboards for Cyndi Lauper on the True Colors world tour, and appeared in the music videos for "Change of Heart", "What's Goin' On", and "Boy Blue", plus the longform videos Live in Paris (which originally aired as an HBO special) and Live in Japan (which was recorded in 1991 when Rosenthal worked once more with Lauper). TV appearances with Lauper included David Letterman, Johnny Carson, and the MTV Video Music Awards.

=== Robert Palmer (1988–1989) ===
From 1988 to 1989, Rosenthal played keyboards for Robert Palmer on the Heavy Nova tour (including one particular stretch of performing 56 concerts on 56 consecutive nights in 56 cities). With Palmer, he appeared in the music video for the song "Early in the Morning", as well as the concert recording, Live at the Apollo (recorded in 1988 but released in 2001).

=== Will to Power, Stacy Lattisaw, other session work (1988–1989) ===
1988 saw Rosenthal play on Will to Power's remake medley of Peter Frampton's "Baby I Love Your Way" and Lynyrd Skynyrd's "Freebird" – titled "Baby, I Love Your Way/Freebird Medley (Free Baby)" – which reached number one on the Billboard Hot 100 for the week of December 3, 1988. Rosenthal also played on several tracks on Will to Power's self-titled album. Around this time, he appeared on albums by Donna Allen (1988's Heaven on Earth) and Nicole McCloud (1989's Jam Packed and later on 1998's Love Town). Rosenthal also co-wrote the 1989 No. 11 R&B hit "Let Me Take You Down" by Stacy Lattisaw and performed on her album, Personal Attention.

=== Whitesnake, Steve Vai (1989–1990) ===
Rosenthal returned to hard rock in 1989 – reconnecting with Steve Vai by playing on Whitesnake's 1989 release, Slip of the Tongue, and also played on the guitarist's 1990 Grammy-nominated solo album, Passion and Warfare. He would make another appearance years later on a Vai album - 2012's The Story of Light.

=== Red Dawn (1992) ===
In 1992 Rosenthal assembled the virtuoso rock group Red Dawn (featuring Rainbow/Blue Öyster Cult/Billy Joel drummer Chuck Burgi and Rainbow/Alice Cooper/Ted Nugent bassist Greg Smith), having produced and written songs for the resulting 1993 album, Never Say Surrender. The critically acclaimed album was originally released in Japan and the United Kingdom. Rosenthal had also recorded some demos previously with singer Mitch Malloy (in a band called Infinity), and recorded additional demos with Winger/Whitesnake guitarist Reb Beach.

=== Billy Joel Band (1993–present) ===
Rosenthal is a member of the Billy Joel Band, as musical director and keyboardist. He has been with Billy Joel since 1993 (appearing on such releases as 1994's Live from the River of Dreams DVD, 1997's Greatest Hits Volume III, 2000's 2000 Years: The Millennium Concert, 2001's The Concert for New York City CD and DVD, 2006's 12 Gardens Live, and 2011's Live at Shea Stadium: The Concert, 2012's 12-12-12: The Concert for Sandy Relief CD and DVD, among other titles).

With Joel, Rosenthal performed on the River of Dreams Tour, all of the Face 2 Face Tours. Rosenthal appeared in and scored music for the 2010 documentary film, The Last Play at Shea, and performed in every show of Joel's 10 year residency at Madison Square Garden, in which Joel and his band played one concert per month at the venue resulting in 104 monthly sold-out shows (interrupted only by the COVID-19 pandemic). Rosenthal appears in all 3 documentary films about Joel's Madison Square Garden residency: Home at the Garden (2014), New York State of Mind (2017) and White Hot Spotlight (2019); and appears in the full length concert video called The 100th: Billy Joel at Madison Square Garden - The Greatest Arena Run of All Time (2024).

Rosenthal appeared in Joel's music videos for "Hey Girl", "To Make You Feel My Love", and "All About Soul", as well as television appearances over the years including Saturday Night Live, The Grammy Awards, David Letterman, Rosie O'Donnell, VH-1 Storytellers, Ellen, Conan O'Brien, The Today Show, Oprah Winfrey, Jimmy Kimmel and Jimmy Fallon. He served as the Associate Music Supervisor (along with Stuart Malina) for all four productions of the Joel/Twyla Tharp Tony Award-winning Broadway show, Movin' Out, where he scored and arranged keyboard parts, programmed the synthesizers, and produced the classical playback tracks. His production work on the cast album of Movin' Out led to a Grammy nomination. Rosenthal was also responsible for training each of the pianists for the "Piano Man" role to be sure that they were playing all of Joel's parts correctly.

Rosenthal became one of only three people to play piano on a Joel record (besides Joel himself), when he played piano on the track "Hey Girl". The only other pianists to do this besides Rosenthal are Ray Charles and Richard Tee.

Rosenthal is working on correcting Joel's entire sheet music catalog, and as of November 2022, the revised and now accurate sheet music for the albums Piano Man, Turnstiles, The Stranger, 52nd Street, Glass Houses, The Nylon Curtain, An Innocent Man, Greatest Hits Volume I & II, Storm Front and River of Dreams have been completed and released by Hal Leonard. Rosenthal continues to perform with Joel, and appeared on the cover of the July 2016 issue of Keyboard Magazine with Joel.

== Other accomplishments ==
=== Enrique Iglesias (1997) ===
In 1997 Rosenthal played keyboards for Latin pop singer Enrique Iglesias on the Vivir world tour and appeared in his music video "Solo En Tí (Only You)". It was Iglesias's debut tour and included live TV performances on Jay Leno and Vibe with Sinbad.

=== Yngwie Malmsteen (1996–2002) ===
Rosenthal played on Yngwie Malmsteen's 1996 Inspiration album, and orchestrated Malmsteen's Millennium Concerto Suite, which was first recorded in 1998 and released as Millennium Concerto Suite for Electric Guitar and Orchestra in E Flat Minor (recorded by the Czech Philharmonic in Prague). It was later recorded live in Japan and released as 2002's Millennium Concerto Suite Live with the New Japan Philharmonic.

=== Happy the Man (2000–present) ===
In 2000 Rosenthal joined the American progressive rock band Happy the Man for their reunion, replacing long-time keyboardist Kit Watkins (who opted not to rejoin the band), and playing alongside original members Stanley Whitaker (guitar), Frank Wyatt (woodwinds, keyboards), and Rick Kennell (bass). He recorded one album with them in 2004, The Muse Awakens. Live dates with Happy the Man included headlining NEARfest in 2001, ProgDay 2005 in North Carolina, and a live concert broadcast on SiriusXM.

=== 9/11 benefits ===
Rosenthal participated in several 9/11 benefit performances in 2001, including America: A Tribute to Heroes, where he performed with Faith Hill along with Paul Shaffer and a gospel choir for the song "There Will Come a Day", and The Concert for New York City where he performed with Billy Joel and the band for the songs "Miami 2017 (Seen The Lights Go Out on Broadway)" and "New York State of Mind". Both of these 9/11 benefit performances were released on DVD and CD in 2001.

=== Ethan Bortnick (2009–2018) ===
Rosenthal met pianist Ethan Bortnick in 2009 (when Bortnick was only 8 years old), which resulted in the duo working together on stage and on studio projects (with Rosenthal serving as Bortnick's musical director, producer and orchestrator), including The Power of Music concert special (which initially aired nationally on PBS in December 2013 and has since become the all-time most successful PBS concert special both in viewership and in pledges raised),. A live recording of the same name was released a year later. As musical director for The Power of Music, Rosenthal put together a 46-piece orchestra and a four-piece band, along with a 120-member children's choir and three background vocalists.

Rosenthal and Bortnick were the focus of a feature in the December 2015 issue of Keyboard Magazine, titled "Ethan Bortnick and David Rosenthal: Piano Men Celebrate the Power of Giving" (Bortnick has raised more than $40 million for nonprofit organizations and charities around the world).

Rosenthal again served as musical director for Bortnick's Generations of Music concert special (which initially aired nationally on PBS in 2017), and arranged and orchestrated for full orchestra, choir, and rock band. The concert also featured debut performances of 4 songs which Rosenthal wrote with Bortnick. A DVD and CD of the concert were also released.

=== Advisory boards, lectures and invited talks (1989–present) ===
Rosenthal served as an advisory board member for the Recording Academy's Producers and Engineers Wing (2008–2009), where he collaborated on a committee of high-profile producers and engineers, including Roger Nichols, Chuck Ainlay, Charles Dye, Eric Schilling and Frank Filipetti, to create a reference document titled "Digital Audio Workstation Guidelines for Music Production". He also served on the advisory board for the Audio Arts Program at Full Sail University (2011) and has lectured at the school. He returns to his alma mater Berklee College of Music as a guest lecturer, and lectures at the Peabody Conservatory at Johns Hopkins as well as other colleges, universities, seminars and private events.

== As synthesizer programmer ==
Aside from designing and programming his own keyboard rigs, Rosenthal is a synthesizer programmer.

=== Broadway (Movin' Out, Tale of Two Cities) ===
Rosenthal's synth programming credits on Broadway include the aforementioned productions of Movin' Out (where he also wrote the synth book) and the 2008 Broadway production of A Tale of Two Cities, where he programmed three keyboard stations and created a score reduction for the keyboardists enabling the full orchestral score to be performed by a smaller ensemble that could fit in the theater's pit.

=== Bruce Springsteen, Dream Theater, others ===
Rosenthal programmed synths for Bruce Springsteen's The Rising Tour (2002–2003) and The Wrecking Ball Tour (2012–2013) (for which Rosenthal designed and programmed keyboard rigs for Roy Bittan and Charlie Giordano), and also for Liza Minnelli's 2009 release Liza's at the Palace, Dream Theater's 1995 release A Change of Seasons, and various Joel tours. He has also consulted on keyboard rig design and synthesizer programming for Chick Corea, Alicia Keys, Brad Cole (Phil Collins), Hardy Hemphill (Shania Twain) and Brocket Parsons (Lady Gaga).

=== Product development ===
Rosenthal has collaborated on product development with manufacturers, including Apple for Mainstage software (2011-current), Muse Research for Receptor (2004–2015), Kurzweil for K2000, K2500 & K2600 (1990–2008), and Opcode Systems for Studio 5 & Galaxy Editors software (1990–1999). In 1996 he released a Lexicon Preset ROM Card for Lexicon's PCM-80 and PCM-81 called "David Rosenthal Music FX".

== As orchestrator ==
=== Rainbow, Yngwie Malmsteen ===
Rosenthal is an orchestrator and has served for a variety of artists. These credits include Rainbow's "Eyes of Fire", which was performed by members of the Montreal Symphony and appeared on the Straight Between The Eyes album (1982), and "Difficult to Cure" (a rock version of Beethoven's "9th" featuring excerpts from the "9th Symphony") which was recorded live with members of the Tokyo Symphony at the Budokan in Tokyo (1984) and later released in 2015 as a full-length concert DVD and live album titled Rainbow Live in Japan 1984. In 1997 Rosenthal orchestrated Yngwie Malmsteen's Millennium Concerto Suite for Electric Guitar and Orchestra – a 308-page score for 90 piece orchestra and 40 piece choir recorded by the Czech Philharmonic in Prague (released on CD in 1998) and performed live in Tokyo by the New Japan Philharmonic (released on DVD in 2002).

=== Elie Wiesel, Phil Ramone ===
In 2010, Rosenthal performed with Elie Wiesel for a concert in New York City titled Memories and Melodies of My Childhood. The show was produced by Phil Ramone and featured Rosenthal's orchestration. The concert featured Elie singing songs as he remembered them from his childhood and was accompanied by an orchestra and choir. The show was filmed and released on DVD, also titled "Elie Wiesel – Memories and Melodies from my Childhood" (2011).

=== Billy Joel, Ethan Bortnick, NJ Lottery ===
Rosenthal's other orchestration credits include Billy Joel's Last Play at Shea and Live at Shea Stadium (2011), Ethan Bortnick's The Power of Music (2013) and Generations of Music (2017), and in 2014 Rosenthal orchestrated five Billy Joel songs for string quartet which were performed live by Joel and a string quartet conducted by Rosenthal at Madison Square Garden. He also wrote, produced and arranged the theme song for the New Jersey Lottery – a big band swing chart titled "Jackpot Swing", which ran twice per day during the NJ Lottery's televised daily drawings for 10 years (2003–2013).

== Awards and nominations ==
Rosenthal received a NY Emmy award in 2022 in the category of Entertainment - Short Form Content (NYC Next's “New York State of Mind”) and received three Grammy Award nominations: Best Rock Instrumental Performance in 1983 (Rainbow's "Anybody There" from the Bent Out of Shape LP), Best Rock Instrumental LP in 1990 (Steve Vai's Passion and Warfare), and Best Musical Show Album in 2003 (Movin' Out Original Broadway Cast Recording). He won the Keyboard Magazine Readers Poll Winner for Best Hired Gun in 1993 and received Berklee College of Music's Distinguished Alumnus Award in 1994. Rosenthal has been awarded numerous gold and platinum albums. In 2024, Rosenthal posthumously inducted Andrew DeNicola, his former band director, into the New Jersey Hall of Fame in recognition of his 50-year career as a music educator and band director in Edison, NJ.

== Equipment ==
Rosenthal's on-stage keyboard rig with Billy Joel includes a Kurzweil K2600x, a Hammond XK-5, a Roland Fantom G and Fantom 6, and Roland PK-5a MIDI pedals, while the entire system is powered by Apple's Mainstage software using two Macintosh computers. Rosenthal also owns a digital recording studio, Sonic Adventures Studio, where he has recorded many of his own projects and session work.

== Select discography / videography ==
- 1982: Rainbow – Straight Between the Eyes
- 1983: Rainbow – Bent Out of Shape
- 1984: Roger Glover – Mask
- 1986: Rainbow – Finyl Vinyl
- 1987: Cyndi Lauper – Live in Paris
- 1988: Stacy Lattisaw – Personal Attention
- 1988: Donna Allen – Heaven on Earth
- 1988: Will to Power – Will to Power
- 1989: Nicole McCloud – Jam Packed
- 1989: Whitesnake – Slip of the Tongue
- 1990: Steve Vai – Passion and Warfare
- 1991: Cyndi Lauper – Live in Japan
- 1993: Red Dawn – Never Say Surrender
- 1994: Billy Joel – A Voyage on the River of Dreams
- 1994: Billy Joel – Live from the River of Dreams
- 1995: Dream Theater – A Change of Seasons
- 1997: Yngwie Malmsteen – Inspiration
- 1997: Billy Joel – Greatest Hits Volume III
- 1997: Good Rats – Tasty Seconds
- 1998: Nicole McCloud – Love Town
- 1998: Yngwie Malmsteen – Millennium Concerto Suite
- 2000: Billy Joel – 2000 Years, The Millennium Concert
- 2000: Hammerhead – Heart Made of Steel (recorded 1985)
- 2001: Vinnie Moore – Defying Gravity
- 2001: Various Artists (with Billy Joel) – The Concert for New York City
- 2001: Various Artists (with Faith Hill) – America: A Tribute to Heroes
- 2001: Robert Palmer – Live at the Apollo (recorded 1988)
- 2002: Yngwie Malmsteen – Millennium Concerto Suite Live with the New Japan Philharmonic
- 2002: Original Broadway Cast Recording – Movin’ Out
- 2002: Billy Joel – My Lives
- 2004: Happy the Man – The Muse Awakens
- 2006: Billy Joel – 12 Gardens Live
- 2009: Liza Minnelli – Liza's at the Palace
- 2010: Billy Joel – Live at Shea Stadium, The Concert
- 2011: Billy Joel – The Last Play at Shea
- 2012: Various Artists (with Billy Joel) – 12-12-12 The Concert for Sandy Relief
- 2012: Steve Vai – The Story of Light
- 2013: Ethan Bortnick – The Power of Music
- 2014: Billy Joel – Home at the Garden (documentary)
- 2015: Rainbow – Live in Japan (recorded 1984)
- 2016: Tony Bennett – Tony Bennett Celebrates 90 (with Billy Joel and Tony Bennett)
- 2017: Itzhak Perlman – Itzhak (appearance with Billy Joel in documentary film)
- 2017: Ethan Bortnick – Generations of Music
- 2017: Billy Joel – New York State of Mind (documentary)
- 2019: Billy Joel – White Hot Spotlight (documentary)
- 2020: The Sharpe Family Singers – A Sharpe Family Christmas
- 2021: NYCnext – New York State of Mind (music video)
