= Stone Cold (Rainbow song) =

Single by Rainbow

from the album Straight Between the Eyes
- B-side: "Rock Fever"
- Released: 26 March 1982 (UK)
- Genre: Hard rock
- Length: 5:15
- Label: Polydor
- Songwriters: Ritchie Blackmore, Joe Lynn Turner, Roger Glover
- Producer: Roger Glover

Rainbow singles chronology
"Death Alley Driver" (1982)	"Stone Cold" (1982)	"Bring On the Night (Dream Chaser)" (1982)

Music video
- "Stone Cold" on YouTube

"Stone Cold" is a song by British-American rock band Rainbow. It was released as a single in 1982 from their album Straight Between the Eyes.

== Chart performance ==
The song reached the Top 40 on the Billboard Hot 100, peaking at number 40 on June 19, 1982, and spent 12 weeks on the chart. This was the band's only top 40 song in the United States. It also topped the Billboard Top Rock Tracks on June 5, 1982.

Chart (1982)	Peak position
Canada Top Singles (RPM)	28
US Billboard Hot 100	40
US Billboard Top Rock Tracks	1
UK Singles Chart	34

== See also ==
- List of Billboard Mainstream Rock number-one songs of the 1980s
