= Chuck Burgi =

American drummer (born 1952)

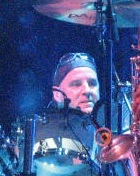

Background information
- Born: Charles Arnold Burgi III; August 15, 1952 (age 73); Montclair, New Jersey, United States
- Origin: Montclair, New Jersey
- Genres: Rock; heavy metal; hard rock; jazz; R&B; pop
- Occupation: Musician
- Instruments: Drums; percussion
- Website: chuckburgi.com

Charles Arnold Burgi III (/ˈbɜːrɡi/, born August 15, 1952, Montclair, New Jersey) is an American drummer. He has performed with many rock bands and musicians, ranging from local New Jersey/New York-area artists to international groups, throughout his prolific career. He is the current drummer for The Billy Joel Band.

== Career ==
Raised in Montclair, New Jersey, Burgi graduated in 1970 from Montclair High School, where he played drums at school and local community events as a student.

After having performed on several album sessions, Burgi earned a spot with the jazz fusion band, Brand X. He then experienced early mainstream success with his band, Balance in the early 1980s. This group also featured Peppy Castro, Bob Kulick, Dennis Feldman and noted arranger and keyboardist Doug Katsaros. The group scored a top-25 hit on the U.S. singles chart with "Breaking Away" in 1981. Although the song was recorded before Burgi joined the group, he had joined in time to record Balance's follow-up album, In for the Count.

In addition to Brand X, Burgi has played and toured with Al Di Meola, Hall & Oates, Joe Lynn Turner, Rainbow, Blue Öyster Cult, Meat Loaf, Fandango and Enrique Iglesias and has recorded with numerous other artists, including Michael Bolton, Glen Burtnik, Bon Jovi and Diana Ross.

Burgi was a member of the on-stage band in the Twyla Tharp - Billy Joel hit musical Movin' Out during the entire 3½ year run on Broadway.

Recent recordings include Billy Joel's live CD 12 Gardens Live and the 2007 Joel-penned single, "Christmas in Fallujah", exclusive to iTunes. Since November 2005, Chuck has been Joel's drummer, touring extensively, including 12 record breaking shows at New York's Madison Square Garden in 2006, 2008's double night The Last Play at Shea and the October 2008 New York Springsteen/Joel benefit for Barack Obama at the Hammerstein Ballroom. He also appears, with former Rainbow bandmate and bassist, Greg Smith, Danger Danger vocalist Ted Poley, and Trixter guitarist Steve Brown, on the self-titled melodic hard rock-styled "Tokyo Motor Fist" album, released February 24, 2017.

He is the brother of actor Richard Burgi and briefly lived in London while playing with Brand X.

== Discography ==
| Year | Band | Title |
|---|---|---|
| 1978 | Brand X | Masques |
| 2016 | Brand X | Live From Stockholm |
| 1980 | Daryl Hall & John Oates | Voices |
| 1980 | Daryl Hall & John Oates | The King Biscuit Flower Hour |
| 1981 | David Bendeth Band | Just Dessert |
| 1981 | The Bendeth Band | The Bendeth Band |
| 1982 | Balance | In For The Count |
| 1983 | Rainbow | Bent Out Of Shape |
| 1986 | Rainbow | Finyl Vinyl |
| 2015 | Rainbow | Japan Tour '84 / Live In Japan 1984 |
| 1983 | Michael Bolton | Michael Bolton |
| 1985 | Michael Bolton | Everybody's Crazy |
| 1985 | Joe Lynn Turner | Rescue You |
| 2016 | Joe Lynn Turner | Street Of Dreams - Boston 1985 |
| 1987 | Glen Burtnick | Heroes and Zeros |
| 1987 | Meat Loaf | Meat Loaf Live |
| 1994 | Blue Öyster Cult | Cult Classic |
| 1994 | Red Dawn | Never Say Surrender |
| 2013 | Rainbow | Black Masquerade |
| 1998 | Blue Öyster Cult | Heaven Forbid |
| 2006 | Billy Joel | 12 Gardens Live |
| 2010 | Billy Joel | The Last Play At Shea (The Documentary Film) |
| 2011 | Billy Joel | Live At Shea Stadium (The Concert) |
| 2016 | Shotgun Wedding | South Of Somewhere |
| 2017 | Tokyo Motor Fist | Tokyo Motor Fist |
| 2018 | Skull Featuring Bob Kulick | Skull II (Now More Than Ever) |
