= I Surrender (Rainbow song) =

1980 song written by Russ Ballard

Single by Rainbow

from the album Difficult to Cure
- B-side: "Vielleicht Das Nächster Zeit (Maybe Next Time)"
- Released: 23 January 1981
- Genre: Hard rock
- Length: 4:01
- Label: Polydor
- Songwriter(s): Russ Ballard
- Producer(s): Roger Glover

Rainbow singles chronology
| "All Night Long" (1980) | "I Surrender" (1981) | "Can't Happen Here" (1981) |

"I Surrender" is a song written by former Argent guitarist and singer Russ Ballard and first released by Head East as a single in October 1980 from their sixth album U.S. 1. It is better known for being a hit for Rainbow the following year, reaching number 3 on the UK Singles Chart.

== Rainbow version ==
Released in January 1981, the song became the band's biggest hit in the UK. Originally, some backing vocals were recorded by Graham Bonnet, but after he quit the band, lead and backing vocals were sung by his replacement Joe Lynn Turner.

Heavy metal band Praying Mantis were originally in the running to release the song and had already recorded the backing track and were adding the vocals when they were told to stop as Rainbow, being the bigger name, had been given the nod to record and release the song. Praying Mantis eventually made their version for their 2024 album Defiance.

The B-side "Vielleicht Das Nächster Zeit" is an instrumental song written by Ritchie Blackmore and Don Airey and was titled with the English equivalent in brackets, "Maybe Next Time". Blackmore made a grammatical error with the German title, which was corrected for later releases as "Vielleicht das nächste mal".

In 2017, the revived band, under the name Ritchie Blackmore's Rainbow, released a re-recording of the song as a digital single, with vocals from the current lead singer Ronnie Romero.

=== Track listing ===
7": Polydor / POSP 221 (UK)

1. "I Surrender" – 4:01
2. "Vielleicht Das Nächster Zeit (Maybe Next Time)" – 3:23

12" Promo: Polydor / PRO 147 (US)

1. "I Surrender" – 4:01
2. "Spotlight Kid" – 4:52

=== Charts ===
==== Weekly charts ====
| Chart (1981) | Peak position |
|---|---|
| Finland (Suomen virallinen lista) | 7 |
| Ireland (IRMA) | 4 |
| UK Singles (OCC) | 3 |
| US Billboard Hot 100 | 105 |
| US Billboard Mainstream Rock | 19 |

==== Year-end charts ====
| Chart (1981) | Peak position |
|---|---|
| UK (Gallup) | 45 |

=== Certifications ===
| Region | Certification | Certified units/sales |
|---|---|---|
| United Kingdom (BPI) | Silver | 250,000^{^} |
^{^} Shipments figures based on certification alone.

== Other versions ==
- In 1981, Finnish singer Markku Aro covered the song in Finnish, titled "Ensi kertaa" for his album Mun suothan tulla vierees sun.
- In 1997, Cherie & Marie Currie re-released their 1980 album Messin' with the Boys, with a cover of the song included as a bonus track
- In 2001, Finnish metal band Stratovarius released a live cover on their 2001 compilation album Intermission.
- In 2002, German metal band At Vance covered the song as a bonus track for their album Only Human.
- In 2004, Japanese metal band Concerto Moon covered the song as a bonus track for their album After the Double Cross.
- In 2009, Swedish pop singer Tove Lo (under the alias Sue Ellen) covered the song for her album Sunday Hangover.
- In 2010, German house music duo The Disco Boys covered the song as a single for their album Volume 10.
