= Rainbow (rock band) =

English rock band

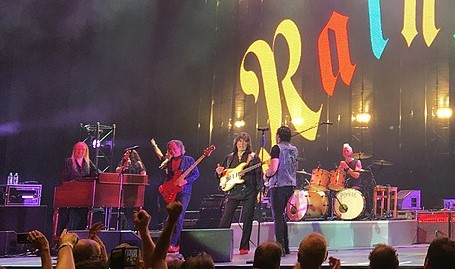
- Rainbow performing in 2017. (From left to right) keyboardist Jens Johansson, backing vocalists Lady Lynn and Candice Night, bassist Bob Nouveau, guitarist and founder Ritchie Blackmore, singer Ronnie Romero, and drummer David Keith

Background information
- Also known as: Ritchie Blackmore's Rainbow; Blackmore's Rainbow
- Origin: California
- Genres: Hard rock; heavy metal
- Works: Discography
- Years active: 1975–1984; 1993–1997; 2015–2019
- Labels: Polydor; BMG
- Spinoffs: Bible Black; Dio; Blackmore's Night; Over the Rainbow
- Spinoff of: Deep Purple; Elf
- Past members: Ritchie Blackmore; Ronnie Romero; David Keith; Bob Nouveau; Jens Johansson; See: Former members

Rainbow (also known as Ritchie Blackmore's Rainbow or Blackmore's Rainbow) were a British hard rock band formed in California in 1975 by guitarist Ritchie Blackmore. Established in the aftermath of Blackmore's first departure from Deep Purple, Rainbow originally featured four members of the American rock band Elf, including their singer Ronnie James Dio, but after their self-titled debut album, Blackmore fired these members, except Dio, recruiting drummer Cozy Powell, bassist Jimmy Bain, and keyboardist Tony Carey. This line-up recorded the band's second album Rising (1976), while Long Live Rock 'n' Roll (1978) saw Bob Daisley and David Stone replace Bain and Carey, respectively. Long Live Rock 'n' Roll was also the last album with Dio before he left the band to join Black Sabbath in 1979.

Rainbow's early work primarily used mystical lyrics in a hard rock/heavy metal style, then moved in a more pop-rock direction following Dio's departure from the group. In 1979, Blackmore and Powell revamped the group, recruiting three new members—singer Graham Bonnet, keyboardist Don Airey and another then-former Deep Purple member, bassist Roger Glover—and this line-up gave the band their commercial breakthrough with the single "Since You Been Gone" from their fourth studio album Down to Earth. With Joe Lynn Turner, who replaced Bonnet in 1980, Rainbow recorded three more albums—Difficult to Cure (1981), Straight Between the Eyes (1982), and Bent Out of Shape (1983)—that had commercial success similar to the band's previous albums. Other members of the band during this period were drummers Bobby Rondinelli and Chuck Burgi and keyboardist David Rosenthal. The band split in 1984, when Blackmore and Glover re-joined Deep Purple.

In 1993, after quitting Deep Purple for good, Blackmore reformed Rainbow with a new line-up, fronted by Doogie White, which recorded their eighth studio album Stranger in Us All (1995). In 1997, Blackmore broke up the band again to start fresh with Blackmore's Night, a collaboration with his wife, Candice Night, on vocals. Blackmore revived the band once again in 2016,, and they performed tours in Europe over the next few years. Rainbow thought about continuing to play live, but those plans were scrapped due to the COVID-19 pandemic, leaving the band on hiatus since their last tour in 2019.

Over the years Rainbow went through many personnel changes, with each studio album recorded with a different line-up, leaving Blackmore as the band's only constant member. Their longest serving line-up—which featured Blackmore on guitar, Blackmore's wife Candice Night on backing vocals, Ronnie Romero on lead vocals, Bob Nouveau on bass, David Keith on drums and Jens Johansson on keyboards—lasted from 2015 to 2019. In 2000 Rainbow were ranked No. 90 on VH1's 100 Greatest Artists of Hard Rock. The band has sold over 28 million records worldwide.

== History ==
=== Formation (1975) ===
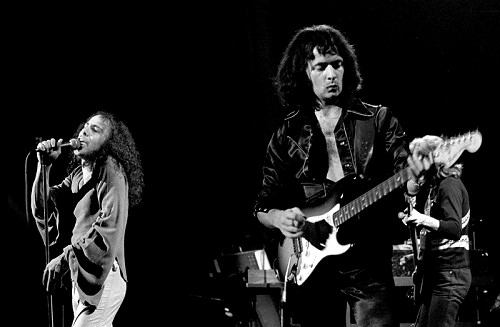
Ronnie James Dio and Ritchie Blackmore in 1977

In 1973, Blackmore steered Deep Purple through a significant personnel change, with Ian Gillan and Roger Glover being replaced by David Coverdale and Glenn Hughes. However, the new members were keen to add their own musical influences into the band's sound, some of which were not to Blackmore's taste. During the sessions for the 1974 album Stormbringer, Blackmore found his request to record the Steve Hammond-penned "Black Sheep of the Family" turned down by the band. On the subsequent tour, Deep Purple were supported by American band Elf, with Blackmore being especially impressed by their singer Ronnie James Dio. Still wishing to put his interpretation of "Black Sheep of the Family" to record, he decided to record the song as a single, accompanied by four members of Elf, Dio, bassist Craig Gruber, drummer Gary Driscoll, and keyboardist Mickey Lee Soule. The sessions went so well that a full album began to take shape, with Blackmore and Dio collaborating on original songs. The album, Ritchie Blackmore's Rainbow, was recorded between February and March 1975 at Musicland Studios in Munich, Germany. The band name was inspired by the Rainbow Bar and Grill in West Hollywood, California. In a 1975 interview with Disc Blackmore explained:

"The name came from a club the band and I had been known to frequent in Los Angeles for nights of booze and other naughty things, Anyway, it's a good name, so I borrowed it."

The style was partly inspired by classical music since Blackmore had started playing cello to help him construct interesting chord progressions, and Dio's lyrics reflected medieval themes and imagery. Dio possessed a powerful and versatile vocal range that encompassed hard rock and lighter ballads. Blackmore commented that when he heard Dio sing, "I felt shivers down my spine." Although Dio never played a musical instrument on any Rainbow album, he is credited with writing and arranging the music with Blackmore, in addition to writing all the lyrics. Blackmore and Dio also found a common ground in their sense of humour. The band, said the singer, "was my opportunity to show my wares. I thank Ritchie for that all the time. Ritchie Blackmore is the one who gave me my opportunity to show what I was worth."

Following the positive experience of recording with Dio, Blackmore decided to leave Deep Purple, playing his last show with them in Paris in April 1975. Blackmore's departure from Deep Purple was announced on 21 June. Released in September 1975, Ritchie Blackmore's Rainbow met a positive critical reception and was a top 20 UK and top 30 US hit.

=== First world tour and initial success (1975–1978) ===
Rainbow performing in Munich, West Germany, in 1977

The album line-up never played live together as Blackmore was unhappy with Driscoll's R&B influenced style of drumming and the funky bass playing of Gruber. While rehearsing for the tour, Blackmore decided to fire Gruber and bring in Jimmy Bain on bass, and after that he also fired Driscoll. As a consequence of that, Soule decided to quit the band to play on Elements (1978) by Roger Glover and tour with the Ian Gillan Band.

Blackmore would continue to dictate personnel for the remainder of the band's lifetime, with drummer and former bandmate Ricky Munro remarking "he was very difficult to get on with because you never knew when he would turn around and say 'You're sacked'." Blackmore recruited bassist Jimmy Bain, keyboard player Tony Carey and drummer Cozy Powell, who had previously worked with Jeff Beck and had some solo success. Powell also greatly appealed to Blackmore in their mutual fondness for practical jokes.

This line-up commenced the first world tour for the band, with the first date in Montreal on 10 November 1975. The centrepiece of the band's live performance was a computer-controlled rainbow including 3,000 lightbulbs, which stretched 40 feet across the stage. In 1976, the band's name was shortened to Rainbow, and a second album, Rising, was recorded in February at Musicland. The band added Deep Purple's "Mistreated" to their setlist, and song lengths were stretched to include improvisation, as displayed on the live album On Stage, released in the summer of 1977. Carey recalls rehearsing the material was fairly straightforward, saying "We didn't work anything out, except the structure, the ending ... very free-form, really progressive rock." The album art was designed by American fantasy artist Ken Kelly, who had drawn Tarzan and Conan the Barbarian.

In August 1976, following a gig at Newcastle City Hall, Blackmore decided to fire Carey, believing his playing style to be too complicated for the band. Unable to find a suitable replacement on such short notice, Carey was quickly reinstated, but as the world tour progressed on to Japan, he found himself regularly being the recipient of Blackmore's pranks and humour. Blackmore subsequently decided that Bain was substandard and fired him in January 1977. Carey quit the band shortly after, after getting tired of Blackmore's pranks. Blackmore, however, had difficulty finding replacements he liked. On keyboards, after auditioning several high-profile artists, including Vanilla Fudge's Mark Stein, Procol Harum's Matthew Fisher and ex-Curved Air and Roxy Music man Eddie Jobson, Blackmore finally selected Canadian David Stone, from the little-known band Symphonic Slam. For a bass player, Blackmore initially chose Mark Clarke, formerly of Jon Hiseman's Colosseum and Uriah Heep, but once in the studio for the next album, Long Live Rock 'n' Roll, Blackmore disliked Clarke's fingerstyle method of playing so much that he fired him on the spot and played bass himself on all but three songs: "Gates of Babylon", "Kill the King", and "Sensitive to Light". Former Widowmaker bassist Bob Daisley was hired to finish the album, completing the band's next line-up.

After the release of Long Live Rock 'n' Roll and its extensive world tour in 1978, Blackmore decided that he wanted to take the band in a new, more mainstream direction, away from the "sword and sorcery" themes. Dio did not agree with this change and left the band.

In a 1979 interview with Sounds, Blackmore said:

- "If they were good enough, they'd still be in the band. I'm not putting down the other members who were in the band, but no-one has ever left Rainbow. It's a fact. Not a confrontation just, well you didn't quite make it, you'll have to do other things."
- "Ronnie is a very good singer- I still like him -but he was becoming very lackadaisical. I'm sure if he were here now he would argue the point, but the fact is, Ronnie was not contributing what he should have done, and he knows that. For the last two years I would put down the riff, the progressions, give him the basic melody and he would write the lyrics. I found that in the past year he wasn't really doing that. He was bitching about the fact that it was Ritchie Blackmore's Rainbow. And I'm going, look, I've tried after three years to make it just Rainbow, not my Rainbow."
- "When people leave the band we don't give too many reasons because we don't want to hinder their career. But if someone's not pulling their weight then I will not put up with someone who's second rate. I'm not going to jump onstage and say 'it's alright ladies and gentlemen, I know they're not very good but they are my friends' like most bands do."
- "A couple of people in the band were taking quite a few drugs and consequently were falling asleep while they were playing because they'd been partying all night. I gave them the sack. It's incredible how those people react. They say 'how dare he do that to me?' but what have they got to offer other than looking the part?"

=== Commercial success (1978–1984) ===
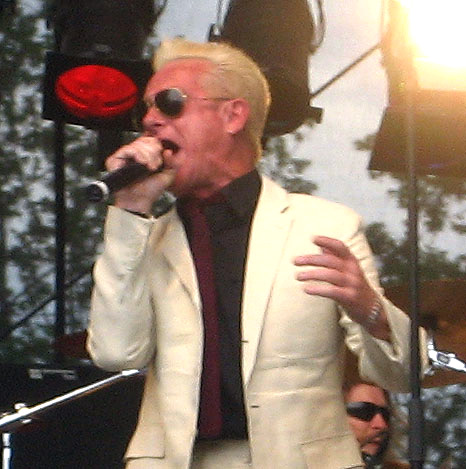
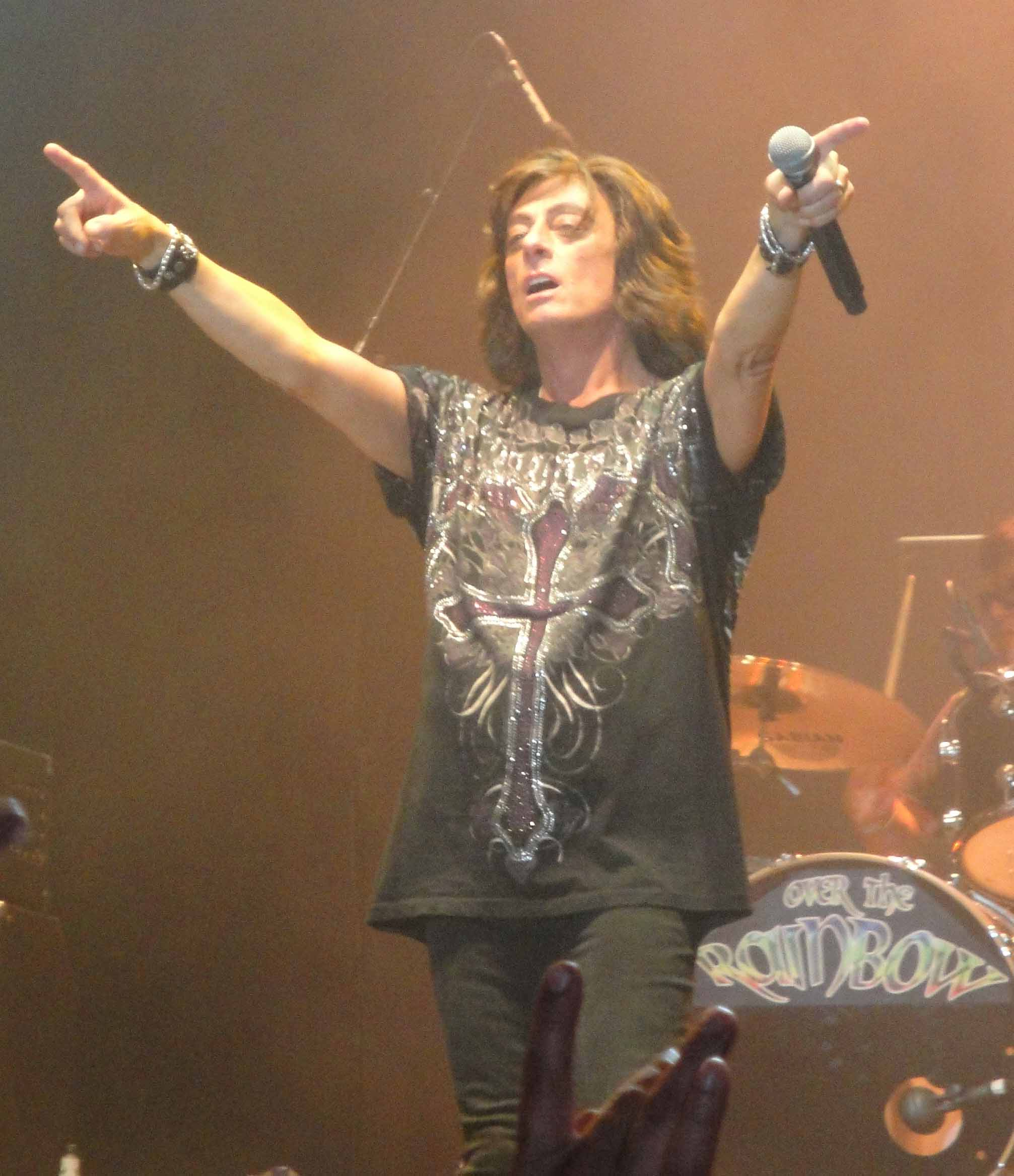
Graham Bonnet (left) in 2008 and Joe Lynn Turner (right) in 2010

Blackmore asked Ian Gillan, also formerly of Deep Purple, to replace Dio, but Gillan turned him down. After a series of auditions, Graham Bonnet, former singer/guitarist of The Marbles, was recruited. Powell stayed, but Daisley was fired, and Stone quit the band to be replaced by Powell's former bandmate Don Airey. At first the band auditioned bass players, rehearsing with Clive Chaman when Stone was still in the band, and later with Jack Green, but, at Cozy Powell's suggestion, Blackmore hired another former Deep Purple member, Roger Glover, as a producer, bassist and lyricist. The resulting album, Down to Earth, featured the band's first major singles chart successes, "All Night Long" and the Russ Ballard-penned "Since You Been Gone". In 1980, the band headlined the inaugural Monsters of Rock festival at Castle Donington in England. However, this was Powell's last Rainbow gig: he had already given his notice to quit, disliking Blackmore's increasingly pop rock direction. Then, after numerous fallouts with Blackmore, Bonnet resigned to pursue a solo project.

For the next album, Bonnet and Powell were replaced by Americans Joe Lynn Turner and Bobby Rondinelli, respectively. The title track from Difficult to Cure was a version of Beethoven's Ninth Symphony. The album spawned their most successful UK single, "I Surrender" (another Ballard song), which reached No.3. After the supporting tour, Don Airey quit over musical differences and was replaced by David Rosenthal.

The band attained significant airplay on Album-oriented rock radio stations in the US with the track "Jealous Lover", reaching No. 13 on Billboard Magazine's Rock Tracks chart. Originally issued as the B-side to "Can't Happen Here", "Jealous Lover" subsequently became the title track to an EP issued in the US that featured similar cover art to Difficult to Cure.

Rainbow's next studio album was Straight Between the Eyes. The album was more cohesive than Difficult to Cure, and had more success in the United States. The band, however, was alienating some of its earlier fans with its more AOR sound. The single "Stone Cold" was a ballad that had chart success (No. 1 on Billboard Magazine's Rock Tracks chart) and its video received heavy airplay on MTV. The successful supporting tour skipped the UK completely and focused on the American market. A date in San Antonio, Texas on this tour was filmed, and the resulting Live Between the Eyes also received repeated showings on MTV, and was released on home video.

Bent Out of Shape saw drummer Rondinelli fired in favour of former Brand X and Balance drummer Chuck Burgi. The album featured the single "Street of Dreams", which became another AOR hit for the group. Blackmore claims on his website that the song's video was banned by MTV for its supposedly controversial hypnosis theme, but Dr. Thomas Radecki of the National Coalition on Television Violence criticised MTV for airing the video, contradicting Blackmore's claim. The following tour saw Rainbow return to the UK, and also to Japan in March 1984 where the band performed "Difficult to Cure" with a full orchestra. The concert was also filmed and released on home video as Japan Tour '84.

=== Dissolution and temporary revival (1984–1997) ===
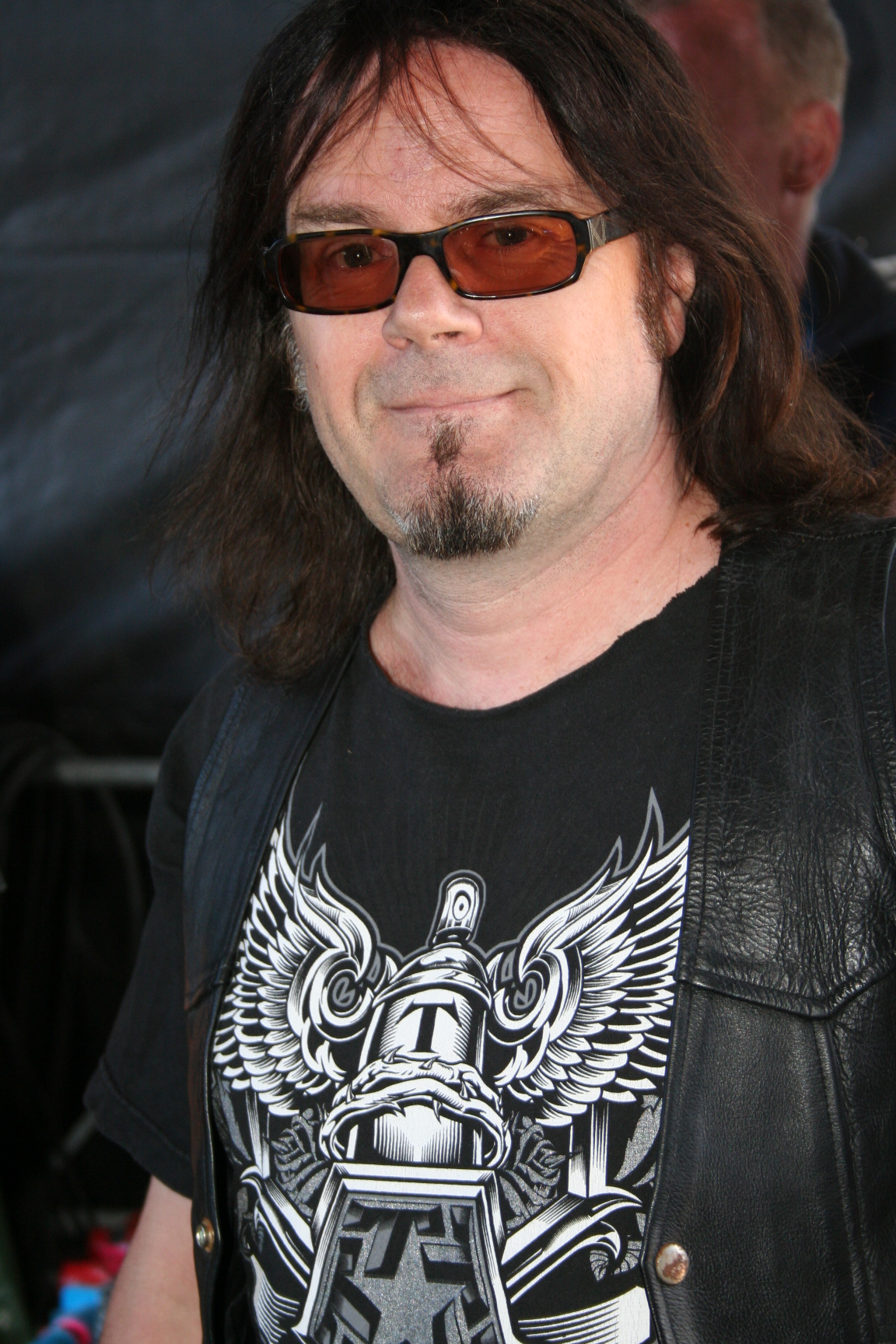
Doogie White, 2009

During the early 1980s, Rainbow's management Thames Talent had co-ordinated attempts to reform Deep Purple Mark II. By April 1984, Blackmore and Glover had committed to the reunion, and Rainbow was disbanded. A then-final Rainbow album, Finyl Vinyl, was released in 1986. A double live album covering the band's whole history, it also includes three stray studio B-sides, "Weiss Heim" ("All Night Long" B-side), "Bad Girl" ("Since You Been Gone" B-side), and "Jealous Lover" ("Can't Happen Here" B-side).

In 1988, after joining the band Impelliteri, Graham Bonnet covered "Since You Been Gone" on the group's debut album, Stand In Line.

In 1993, Blackmore left Deep Purple again due to "creative differences" with other members, and reformed Rainbow with all-new members featuring Scottish singer Doogie White. The band released Stranger in Us All in 1995, and embarked on a lengthy world tour.

The tour proved successful, and the show in Düsseldorf, Germany, was professionally filmed for the Rockpalast TV show. This show, initially heavily bootlegged (and considered by many collectors to be the best Rainbow bootleg of the era), was officially released by Eagle Records on CD and DVD as Black Masquerade in 2013. The live shows featured frequent changes in set lists, and musical improvisations that proved popular with bootleggers and many shows are still traded over a decade later.

However, Blackmore turned his attention to his long-time musical passion, Renaissance and medieval music. Rainbow was put on hold once again after playing its final concert in Esbjerg, Denmark in 1997. Blackmore, together with his partner Candice Night as vocalist then formed the Renaissance-influenced Blackmore's Night. Around the same time as production of Stranger in Us All (1995), they were already gearing up their debut album Shadow of the Moon (1997).

=== Split (1997–2014) ===
Many Rainbow songs have been performed live by former members of the band since the group's split in 1984 and then in 1997, particularly former frontmen Ronnie James Dio, Graham Bonnet, Joe Lynn Turner and Doogie White in recent years. Also, Don Airey often plays 1979–1981 era songs during his solo shows. Blackmore's Night occasionally performs one or two Rainbow songs live, namely "Ariel", "Man on the Silver Mountain", "Sixteenth Century Greensleeves", "Rainbow Eyes", "Street of Dreams" and "Temple of the King". The latter three were also re-recorded by Blackmore's Night in studio.

In 2002–2004, the Hughes Turner Project played a number of Rainbow songs at their concerts. On 9 August 2007, Joe Lynn Turner played a concert Back to Rainbow in Helsinki, Finland. The concert consisted of songs from the 1979–1983 era. In June 2008 Joe Lynn Turner, and the Graham Bonnett Band, played a series of 4 concerts in Finland, performing Rainbow songs.

In 2008, Joe Lynn Turner, Bobby Rondinelli, Greg Smith and Tony Carey created the touring tribute band Over the Rainbow with Jürgen Blackmore (Ritchie's son) as the guitarist. Over the Rainbow performed songs from every era of the band's history. After the first tour, Tony Carey had to leave the band due to health concerns; he was replaced by another former Rainbow member, Paul Morris. Plans for the band to record original material were scrapped and Over the Rainbow was formally disbanded in 2011.

=== Revival (2015–present) ===
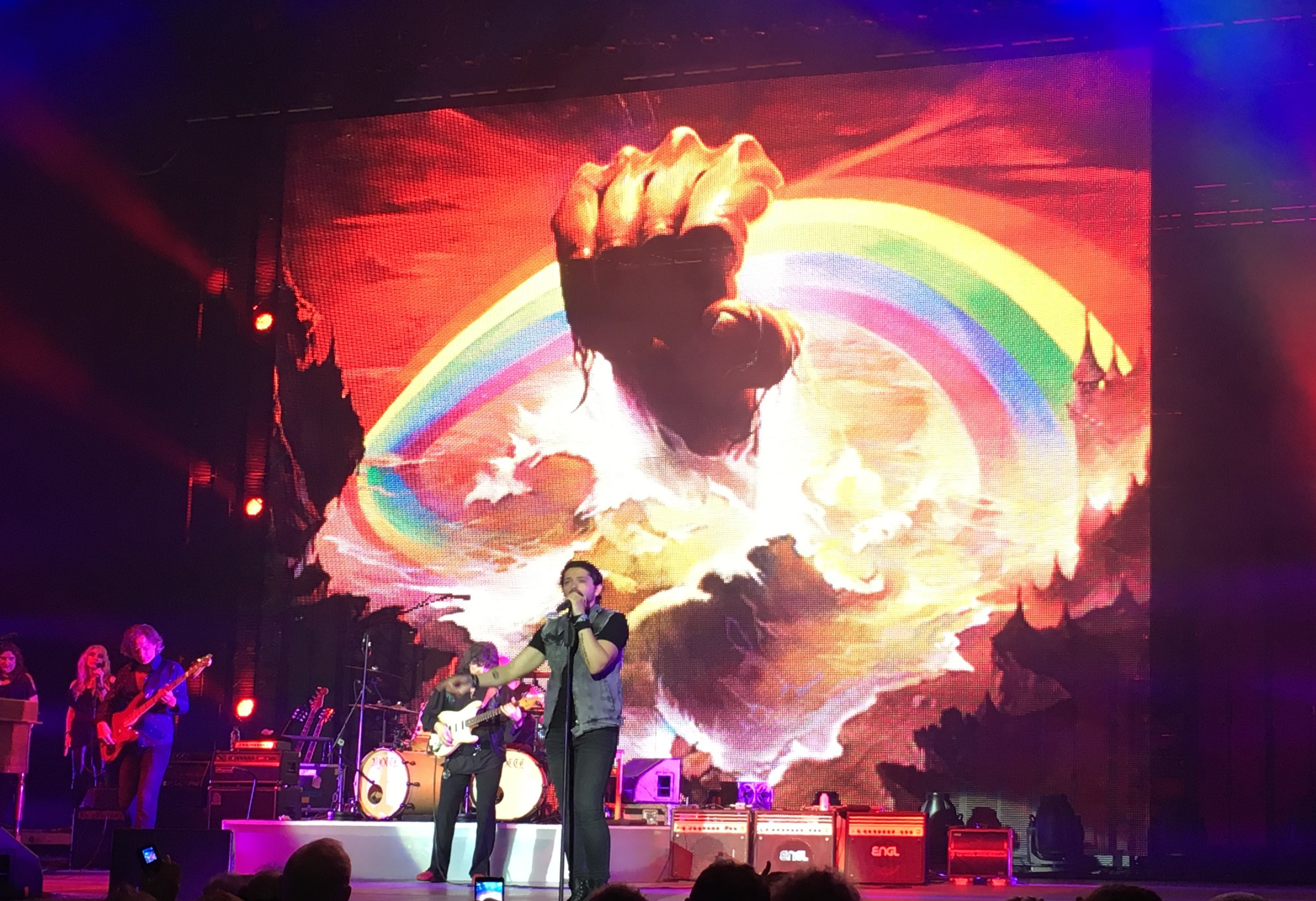
Ritchie Blackmore's Rainbow performing at the Stone Free Festival 2017

In 2015, Blackmore announced that he would play "all rock" concerts in the summer of 2016 under the banner "Ritchie Blackmore's Rainbow", his first rock shows since 1997. The new Rainbow line-up was announced on 6 November 2015. It featured Lords of Black singer Ronnie Romero, Stratovarius keyboardist Jens Johansson, Blackmore's Night drummer David Keith and bassist Bob Nouveau.

The band headlined the German edition of the "Monsters of Rock" festival. They debuted on 17 June 2016 at Loreley Freilichtbühne, an open-air show in front of an audience of an estimated 15,000. On 18 June, they played another open-air gig for 30,000 fans in Bietigheim-Bissingen (Festplatz am Viadukt). The third and final show took place at the Birmingham Genting Arena in England. A live album and DVD, Memories in Rock, was released in late 2016.

When asked in May 2016 if Rainbow were planning to record a new studio album, bassist Bob Curiano said, "I'd love to go into the studio with this Rainbow. All we need is Ritchie to say, 'Let's go!' I think all of us feel under pressure, because of the fans' expectations. For me, the pressure makes me work harder and get better results." However, Blackmore said that they had no plans for a new album or world tour, and that the reunion was "just a few dates for fun." Blackmore also said that Rainbow had received many offers to do a "few more shows again" in the future.

Despite an earlier decision not to release new music, Blackmore revealed in a May 2017 interview with Burrn! magazine that Rainbow were in the studio recording two new tracks. Blackmore stated, "I wrote one new song, and also recorded one of the old ones. Ronnie, who is in Madrid now, added his vocals and sent it back. Rather than make an album, we may release as singles."

Rainbow embarked on a four-date UK tour in June 2017. It kicked off with the band's first show in London since 1995 at the second annual Stone Free Festival at The O2, followed by shows in Manchester, Glasgow and Birmingham; the Manchester show was cancelled following the Manchester Arena bombing.

Rainbow released another live album and DVD, Memories in Rock II in 2018, which chronicles a live show in Germany. The final track on the album, "Waiting for a Sign", is a studio track recorded with the current band line-up, and marked Rainbow's first song in 23 years. The band played five dates in April 2018, at Moscow, St Petersburg, Helsinki, Berlin, and Prague. The shows were well-attended, with Helsinki a sell-out. The set-list again varied from night-to-night, with an almost 50/50 selection of Rainbow and Deep Purple songs. Rainbow released another single, "The Storm", in May 2019, which was "a rocked-up remake" of Blackmore's Night's 2001 song with the same title, and the band resumed touring in Europe that summer.

The future of Rainbow has been uncertain since wrapping up their 2019 European tour. When asked in November 2020 about the current status of the band, Romero said, "Obviously, nothing's gonna happen next year. And Ritchie and Candice, they're really focused on the new Blackmore's Night record. So probably if everything comes back to normality in the next few years, probably we'll do some more shows. But at the moment, everything is on standby." In April 2022, Romero claimed that he had kept in contact with the remaining members of Rainbow, but again expressed his doubt that the band would ever tour again or record new music: "I don't think there's gonna be any plan in the near future because the pandemic was way complicated, obviously, for all the music business. And now it's like everything is getting back to normal but delayed two years. So there is a lot of shows happening. And until it gets completely back to normal, it's gonna happen at least a couple of years. So I think Ritchie is not too much into the idea to make anything so far. And he is focused right now with Blackmore's Night — they released an album recently, I think. There's no plan so far; we were not informed about any plan. So we're just waiting for… With Ritchie, you never know — maybe in a couple of days he's gonna come with an idea. You never know". In October 2023, Romero effectively confirmed his departure from the band by stating that Rainbow was "not his place anymore" while speaking positively of his time in the group.

In December 2025, it was announced that the first in a series of box sets spanning the band's career would be released on 6 March 2026, entitled The Temple of the King: 1975-1976. The nine-CD set spans the first two years of the band's existence and contains newly remastered versions of their first two studio albums, as well as three complete live shows recorded in Germany on the 1976 Rising Tour, along with two discs of bonus tracks including studio rehearsals, single versions, rough mixes, and unreleased tracks.

== Members ==
=== Final lineup ===
- Ritchie Blackmore – guitars (1975–1984, 1993–1997, 2015–2019)
- Ronnie Romero – lead vocals (2015–2019)
- Jens Johansson – keyboards (2015–2019)
- Bob Nouveau – bass, backing vocals (2015–2019)
- David Keith – drums (2015–2019)

== Discography ==
=== Studio albums ===
- Ritchie Blackmore's Rainbow (1975)
- Rising (1976)
- Long Live Rock 'n' Roll (1978)
- Down to Earth (1979)
- Difficult to Cure (1981)
- Straight Between the Eyes (1982)
- Bent Out of Shape (1983)
- Stranger in Us All (1995)

== Bibliography ==
- Jerry Bloom, Black Knight – Ritchie Blackmore (Omnibus Press, 2006)
- Jerry Bloom, Long Live Rock 'n' Roll Story (Wymer Publishing, 2009)
- Roy Davies, Rainbow Rising – The Story of Ritchie Blackmore's Rainbow (Helter Skelter, 2002)
- Martin Popoff, Rainbow – English Castle Magic (Metal Blade, 2005)
- Greg Prato, The Other Side of Rainbow (self-published, 2016)
- Dio, Ronnie; Wall, Mick (2021). Rainbow in the Dark. Little Brown Books. ISBN 978-1-472-13517-9.
