= Bent Out of Shape =

- Cover design by Storm Thorgerson

Studio album by Rainbow
- Released: 9 September 1983
- Studios: Sweet Silence, Copenhagen
- Genre: Hard rock
- Length: 40:25
- Labels: Polydor (UK); Mercury (US)
- Producer: Roger Glover

Rainbow chronology
Straight Between the Eyes (1982)	Bent Out of Shape (1983)	Stranger in Us All (1995)

Singles from Bent Out of Shape
- 1. "Street of Dreams" Released: 19 August 1983; 2. "Can't Let You Go" Released: 28 October 1983

Professional ratings
Review scores
Source	Rating
AllMusic	2.5/5 stars
Collector's Guide to Heavy Metal	9/10
Smash Hits	5/10

Bent Out of Shape is the seventh studio album released by English hard rock band Rainbow. It was originally released on 9 September 1983 as an LP and cassette. The cassette featured several longer edits compared to the vinyl version. It was recorded at Sweet Silence Studios in Copenhagen.

== History ==
Bent Out of Shape would be Rainbow's final studio album before their 12-year hiatus from the studio. It also proved to be the band's final studio album with vocalist Joe Lynn Turner, bassist Roger Glover and keyboardist David Rosenthal, and their only one to feature drummer Chuck Burgi, who replaced Bobby Rondinelli just prior to the album's recording sessions. Rosenthal and Burgi would both eventually join Billy Joel's band.

The instrumental "Snowman" is based upon "Walking in the Air," a song written by Howard Blake for the 1982 animated film The Snowman, which was based on Raymond Briggs' 1978 children's book of the same name.

== Release and legacy ==
The album's cover was designed by Hipgnosis, and alongside Led Zeppelin's Coda, the artwork was amongst the last to be created by the studio before disbanding in 1983.

This album is generally referred to by critics and fans as a commercial effort, with the band attempting to repeat the success of the song "Stone Cold" from the previous album Straight Between the Eyes. As a result, some of the songs, like the first single released from this album, "Street of Dreams", are usually considered to be more in the album-oriented rock style, instead of the hard rock sound of earlier Rainbow albums. The album was particularly aimed at the US market: the title is an American idiom rather than a British one. However, the album received positive reviews in the U.K. Howard Johnson of Kerrang! magazine (No.51 – Sept 22-Oct 5, 1983) praised the album as "possibly Rainbow's most complete work to date" and called "Desperate Heart" and "Street of Dreams" "two of this year's finest tunes".

In 1984, "Anybody There" was nominated for a Grammy Award for Best Rock Instrumental Performance.

A remastered CD reissue was released in May 1999, which restored the artwork of the original release. This has two tracks of a longer duration than on the first US CD issue.

The song "Street of Dreams" has been re-recorded in two versions by Blackmore's Night in 2006 for their fifth studio album, The Village Lanterne. The version featured on a regular album was sung by Candice Night. The other version, a bonus track on a special edition of the album, was performed in a duet by Night and Turner.

== Promotion ==
The 1983 music video for "Street of Dreams" was directed by Storm Thorgerson from the Hipgnosis design team. The video was banned by MTV for its supposedly controversial scene of a person being hypnotized. The 1984 music video for "Can't Let You Go" was directed by Dominic Orlando. It was filmed in New York City and inspired by the 1920 silent b/w film The Cabinet of Dr. Caligari. Both videos were included on Rainbow's home video collection The Final Cut in 1985.

== Track listing ==
All tracks are written by Ritchie Blackmore and Joe Lynn Turner, except where indicated.

Side one
No.	Title	Writer(s)	Length
1.	"Stranded"		4:25
2.	"Can't Let You Go"	Blackmore, Turner, Intro - David Rosenthal	4:19
3.	"Fool for the Night"		4:03
4.	"Fire Dance"	Blackmore, Turner, Roger Glover, Rosenthal	4:27
5.	"Anybody There" (instrumental)	Blackmore	2:37

Side two
No.	Title	Writer(s)	Length
6.	"Desperate Heart"		4:00
7.	"Street of Dreams"		4:24
8.	"Drinking with the Devil"		3:41
9.	"Snowman" (instrumental)	Howard Blake, arr. by Blackmore	4:30
10.	"Make Your Move"		3:55

The LP has "Desperate Heart" at 4:00, whilst cassette and remastered CD have this track at 4:36, repeating the verse after the guitar solo. Similarly, "Make Your Move" is 3:56 on the LP, yet 5:25 on cassette and remastered CD, due to a reprise of a bridge section and a much longer playout. The first US CD edition (Polydor - 815 305-2) uses the LP version.

== Personnel ==
Rainbow

- Ritchie Blackmore – guitars
- Roger Glover – bass, percussion, producer
- Joe Lynn Turner – vocals
- David Rosenthal – keyboards
- Chuck Burgi – drums

Production

- Flemming Rasmussen – engineer
- Thomas Breckling – assistant engineer
- Nick Blagona – mixing at BearTracks Studios, New York
- Greg Calbi – mastering at Sterling Sound, New York

== Singles ==
- 1983 – "Street of Dreams"/"Anybody There"
- 1983 – "Street of Dreams"/"Anybody There"/"Power" (live) – 12" release
- 1983 – "Can't Let You Go"/"All Night Long" (live)
- 1983 – "Can't Let You Go"/"All Night Long" (live)/"Stranded" (live) – 12" release
- 1983 – "Can't Let You Go"/"Drinking with the Devil" – Spain

== Charts ==
Chart (1983)	Peak position
Canada Top Albums/CDs (RPM)	93
Dutch Albums (Album Top 100)	44
Finnish Albums (The Official Finnish Charts)	2
German Albums (Offizielle Top 100)	25
Japanese Albums (Oricon)	3
Norwegian Albums (VG-lista)	6
Swedish Albums (Sverigetopplistan)	6
UK Albums (Official Charts)	11
US Billboard 200	34
