= Straight Between the Eyes =

- Cover art by Jeff Cummins and Hipgnosis

Studio album by Rainbow
- Released: 14 April 1982
- Studios: Le Studio (Morin-Heights, Quebec)
- Genre: Hard rock
- Length: 40:58
- Labels: Polydor (UK); Mercury (US)
- Producer: Roger Glover

Rainbow chronology
Jealous Lover (1981)	Straight Between the Eyes (1982)	Bent Out of Shape (1983)

Singles from Straight Between the Eyes
- 1. "Stone Cold" Released: 26 March 1982; 2. "Death Alley Driver" Released: 1982 (Japan)

Professional ratings
Review scores
Source	Rating
AllMusic	4/5 stars
Collector's Guide to Heavy Metal	8/10
Rolling Stone	1.5/5 stars

Straight Between the Eyes is the sixth studio album by English rock band Rainbow, released in 1982 by Polydor Records. A remastered CD reissue, with packaging duplicating the original vinyl release, was released in May 1999. It was released on 14 April 1982 in the US on Mercury Records.

== History ==
The album was the band's first with keyboardist David Rosenthal replacing Don Airey. The remaining members were the same as on the previous year's Difficult to Cure album.

According to Blackmore, the title came from a meeting with Jeff Beck in 1967, when the two were discussing Jimi Hendrix. Beck told Blackmore that Hendrix's guitar playing hit him "straight between the eyes".

The sleeve-art is by British artist Jeff Cummins and Hipgnosis, though has been described as "one of [Hipgnosis]' very worst; in fact, so bad, it taints the music." The original vinyl issue had the lyrics printed on the inner sleeve.

In an April 1982 interview with British rock magazine Kerrang!, Blackmore stated of "MISS Mistreated", "Well it's to avoid confusion that the 'Miss' is written three times bigger than the 'mistreated' but I expect we'll have someone who shall remain nameless coming up to us saying 'I wrote that song'!" That someone being David Coverdale, with whom Blackmore had co-written "Mistreated" for the 1974 Deep Purple album Burn. Blackmore had this issue with Coverdale previously when a rendition of "Mistreated" was included on the Rainbow live album On Stage.

Videos were shot for the songs "Stone Cold" and "Death Alley Driver", the latter featuring Sega's video game Turbo. Both videos received heavy play on MTV and were later included on Rainbow's The Final Cut home video in 1985.

== Tour ==
The tour featured a giant pair of moving mechanical eyes as part of the stageset, with spotlights shining from the pupils. This is captured on the video release Live Between the Eyes recorded at the Hemisfair Arena in San Antonio, Texas on August 18, 1982. The UK had to wait until September 1983 before they toured.

== Accolades ==
In 2022, Straight Between the Eyes was named #5 of 'The 25 greatest rock guitar albums of 1982' list in Guitar World.

== Track listing ==
All tracks are written by Ritchie Blackmore, Joe Lynn Turner, and Roger Glover except where indicated.

Side one
No.	Title	Writer(s)	Length
1.	"Death Alley Driver"	Blackmore, Turner	4:42
2.	"Stone Cold"		5:17
3.	"Bring On the Night (Dream Chaser)"		4:06
4.	"Tite Squeeze"		3:15
5.	"Tearin' Out My Heart"		4:03

Side two
No.	Title	Writer(s)	Length
6.	"Power"		4:26
7.	"MISS Mistreated"	Blackmore, Turner, David Rosenthal	4:27
8.	"Rock Fever"	Blackmore, Turner	3:50
9.	"Eyes of Fire"	Blackmore, Turner, Bobby Rondinelli	6:37

== Personnel ==
Rainbow

- Ritchie Blackmore – guitars
- Roger Glover – bass, producer
- Joe Lynn Turner – vocals
- Bobby Rondinelli – drums
- David Rosenthal – keyboards, orchestral arrangements

Additional musicians

- François Dompierre – orchestra conductor
- Raymond Dessaint – orchestra lead

Production

- Engineered by Nick Blagona (assisted by Robbie Whelan)
- Recorded at Le Studio, Morin Heights, Canada
- Digital mixing by Roger Glover and Nick Blagona
- Digital mastering by Greg Calbi, Sterling Sound, New York

== Charts ==
Chart (1982)	Peak position
Australian Albums (Kent Music Report)	86
Canada Top Albums/CDs (RPM)	17
Dutch Albums (Album Top 100)	19
Finnish Albums (The Official Finnish Charts)	2
German Albums (Offizielle Top 100)	21
Japanese Albums (Oricon)	8
Norwegian Albums (VG-lista)	12
Swedish Albums (Sverigetopplistan)	7
UK Albums (Official Charts)	5
US Billboard 200	30

== Certifications ==
Region	Certification	Certified units/sales
Finland (Musiikkituottajat)	Gold	25,000
United Kingdom (BPI)	Silver	60,000^{^}
^{^} Shipments figures based on certification alone.

== In other media ==
The song "Stone Cold" was featured in the video game Grand Theft Auto: Vice City Stories on the radio station Emotion 98.3.
