= Down to Earth (Rainbow album) =

- Cover art by Ron Walotsky

Studio album by Rainbow
- Released: 3 August 1979
- Recorded: March–July 1979
- Studio: Château Pelly de Cornfeld (France); Kingdom Sound Studios (Long Island) (vocals)
- Genre: Hard rock
- Length: 36:05
- Label: Polydor
- Producer: Roger Glover

Rainbow chronology
Long Live Rock 'n' Roll (1978)	Down to Earth (1979)	Difficult to Cure (1981)

Singles from Down to Earth
- 1. "Since You Been Gone" Released: 31 August 1979; 2. "All Night Long" Released: 8 February 1980

Down to Earth is the fourth studio album by the British hard rock band Rainbow. It is their last album to feature drummer Cozy Powell, their first with bassist Roger Glover and keyboardist Don Airey and their only album with vocalist Graham Bonnet, as well as their only album with an entirely British lineup. Released in 1979, it contains Rainbow's first hit single "Since You Been Gone", marking a more commercial direction of the band's sound.

== Writing and recording ==
The writing of Down to Earth began at Ritchie Blackmore's house in Connecticut in January 1979. By that time, he had dismissed both bassist Bob Daisley and keyboardist David Stone before singer Ronnie James Dio quit the band. Blackmore had already recruited his old Deep Purple bandmate Roger Glover as producer and started auditioning musicians for the vacant slots in the band, while songwriting progressed with Blackmore, Cozy Powell and session bassist Clive Chaman. The songs were largely written by Blackmore and Glover. "It was a great opportunity for me, and why should I bear a grudge? (about being dismissed from Purple in 1973) " recalled Glover. "I'm a huge Ritchie fan. Some of my biggest influences have come from him."

By early 1979, Blackmore had recruited keyboardist Don Airey – a suggestion from Powell – and considered Peter Goalby of Trapeze, as well as another old Deep Purple bandmate Ian Gillan, to replace Dio. In April 1979, Jack Green of The Pretty Things was hired as new bass player for the recording sessions at Château Pelly de Cornfeld, in the countryside of Southern France, but he did not stay for long. Producer Glover ended up playing bass on the album and provided lyrics for all songs. While auditions for the new singer proceeded, Glover tracked down ex-Marbles singer Graham Bonnet, who auditioned in France and was immediately hired.

During song composition, Bonnet composed his vocal melodies although his contributions remained uncredited. His vocals were not recorded with the other tracks in France, but later at Kingdom Sound Studios on Long Island, when all other recording sessions were completed. Down to Earth is the only Rainbow album to feature Bonnet, though he was still part of the band when writing for Difficult to Cure began.

Also recorded for the proposed next single, but unreleased due to Bonnet's departure, was "Will You Love Me Tomorrow". Bonnet had previously recorded this song for his first, eponymously titled, solo album in 1977. Rainbow's version was recorded in the studio in May 1980, during rehearsals for the Japanese leg of the Down to Earth tour. It was subsequently played live throughout that tour.

== Tour ==
In 1980, Ritchie Blackmore's Rainbow headlined the inaugural Monsters of Rock festival at Castle Donington in England.

Songs from Down to Earth have been performed by Graham Bonnet at his solo shows, as well as at concerts performed with Don Airey (2001) and Joe Lynn Turner (2007).

== Release ==
In the UK there was a limited edition clear vinyl LP release.

"Bad Girl", an outtake from the album sessions, was used as the B-side to the "Since You Been Gone" single. Similarly, "Weiss Heim", an instrumental recorded in Copenhagen in January 1980, was the B-side to "All Night Long".

A remastered CD reissue was released in May 1999, with packaging duplicating the original vinyl.

In 2011, a Deluxe Edition of the album was released, featuring a bonus disc with previously unreleased songs and instrumental versions of the basic tracks.

== Reception ==
Professional ratings
Review scores
Source	Rating
AllMusic	3/5 stars
Collector's Guide to Heavy Metal	10/10
PopMatters	7/10
Record Collector	3/5 stars

AllMusic editor Stephen Thomas Erlewine defines the album "a fine hard rock platter", which "might not offer anything unique, but it delivers the goods." He criticizes mostly Bonnet's vocals, but praises "the guitar artistry and mystical sensibility of Ritchie Blackmore", who "sounds invigorated on the album". PopMatters' Adrien Begrand, reviewing the 2011 Deluxe Edition, remarks how Down to Earth "is somewhat underrated compared to the towering Dio discography, but it remains a strong outing 31 years later", even with "the new material sounding so much more stripped-down compared to the overtly epic heavy metal arrangements of Dio-era Rainbow". The songs are "eight searing, hooky hard rockers", remarkably rendered by Bonnet's performance and energy. The album "is perhaps the most divisive record in Rainbow’s catalogue" according to Record Collector reviewer, because of "Blackmore's single-minded pursuit of mainstream success" and the departure from the sound of preceding albums. He adds that this is a "strong" album with many "classic radio" staples, but the second disc of the Deluxe Edition does not add anything essential to the listening experience. Canadian journalist Martin Popoff praised Down to Earth and described it as "Rainbow's pièce de resistance, forceful and majestic", highlighting "the core essence of Blackmore's potential" and, with a few exceptions, as heavy as the two previous albums.

In 2005, Down to Earth was ranked number 431 in Rock Hard's book The 500 Greatest Rock & Metal Albums of All Time.

== Legacy ==
In an interview with Sounds in 1979, Blackmore said: "I have so much respect for classical musicians that when I listen to myself I think, oh, that's nonsense. I can put down other people's music because the fact is I put down my own music and say it's rubbish. A lot of it is- not all of it- "No Time to Lose" definitely is but "Eyes of the World" is OK. But a good deal of it is a waste of time."

== Track listing ==
All tracks are written by Ritchie Blackmore and Roger Glover, except where noted.

Side one
No.	Title	Length
1.	"All Night Long"	3:53
2.	"Eyes of the World"	6:42
3.	"No Time to Lose"	3:45
4.	"Makin' Love"	4:38

Side two
No.	Title	Writer(s)	Length
5.	"Since You Been Gone"	Russ Ballard	3:25
6.	"Love's No Friend"		4:55
7.	"Danger Zone"		4:31
8.	"Lost in Hollywood"	Blackmore, Glover, Cozy Powell	4:51
Total length:			36:40

=== 2011 deluxe edition track listing ===
Disc one
No.	Title	Writer(s)	Length
1.	"All Night Long"		3:53
2.	"Eyes of the World"		6:42
3.	"No Time to Lose"		3:45
4.	"Makin' Love"		4:38
5.	"Since You Been Gone"	Russ Ballard	3:25
6.	"Love's No Friend"		4:55
7.	"Danger Zone"		4:31
8.	"Lost in Hollywood"	Blackmore, Glover, Cozy Powell	4:51
9.	"Bad Girl" (B-side of "Since You Been Gone", 1979)		4:51
10.	"Weiss Heim" (B-side of "All Night Long", 1980)	Blackmore	5:15

Disc two
No.	Title	Length
1.	"All Night Long" (instrumental outtake)	4:43
2.	"Eyes of the World" (instrumental outtake)	6:52
3.	"Spark Don't Mean a Fire"	3:52
4.	"Makin' Love" (instrumental outtake)	4:46
5.	"Since You Been Gone" (instrumental outtake)	4:02
6.	"Ain't a Lot of Love in the Heart of Me"	5:00
7.	"Danger Zone" (instrumental outtake)	5:31
8.	"Lost in Hollywood" (instrumental outtake)	4:03
9.	"Bad Girl" (instrumental outtake)	5:04
10.	"Ain't a Lot of Love in the Heart of Me" (alternative outtake)	5:23
11.	"Eyes of the World" (instrumental outtake)	6:11
12.	"All Night Long" (Cozy Powell mix)	3:54
Total length:		1:45:00

== Personnel ==
Rainbow

- Ritchie Blackmore – guitars
- Cozy Powell – drums
- Roger Glover – bass, producer
- Don Airey – keyboards
- Graham Bonnet – vocals

Production

- Gary Edwards – engineer
- Michael Palmer, Leigh Mantle – assistant engineers
- Greg Calbi – mastering

== Charts ==
Chart (1979)	Peak position
Australian Albums (Kent Music Report)	27
Finnish Albums (The Official Finnish Charts)	26
German Albums (Offizielle Top 100)	19
Japanese Albums (Oricon)	15
Swedish Albums (Sverigetopplistan)	17
UK Albums (OCC)	6
US Billboard 200	66

Chart (2011)	Peak position
Japanese Albums (Oricon)	90

== Certifications ==
Region	Certification	Certified units/sales
United Kingdom (BPI)	Gold	100,000^{^}
^{^} Shipments figures based on certification alone.
