= Since You Been Gone =

1976 single by Russ Ballard

Single by Russ Ballard

from the album Winning
- A-side: "Since You Been Gone"
- B-side: "Venus (Shine Your Light)"
- Released: 30 January 1976
- Genre: Rock; pop
- Length: 2:50
- Label: Epic
- Songwriter: Russ Ballard
- Producer: Muff Winwood

Russ Ballard singles chronology
"Loose Women" (1975)	"Since You Been Gone" (1976)	"The Russ Ballard Story Part 1" (1976)

"Since You Been Gone" is a song written by former Argent vocalist and guitarist Russ Ballard and first released on his 1976 album Winning. It was covered by Rainbow in 1979 and released as a single from their album Down to Earth.

== Rainbow version ==
"Since You Been Gone"

Single by Rainbow

from the album Down to Earth
- A-side: "Since You Been Gone"
- B-side: "Bad Girl"
- Released: 31 August 1979
- Genre: Hard rock; pop rock
- Length: 3:17
- Label: Polydor
- Songwriter: Russ Ballard
- Producer: Roger Glover

Rainbow singles chronology
"LA Connection" (1978)	"Since You Been Gone" (1979)	"All Night Long" (1980)

Official audio
- "Since You Been Gone" on YouTube

In 1979, "Since You Been Gone" was covered by Rainbow, who released it as the first single from their 1979 album Down to Earth with Graham Bonnet on lead vocals. It was a top-10 single in the United Kingdom, where it reached number six. In the US, the song reached number 57. It was named the 82nd-best "Hard Rock Song of All Time" by VH1. The song was later included on the second trailer and on the soundtrack to Guardians of the Galaxy Vol. 3, which first aired on February 12, 2023, during Super Bowl LVII.

=== Charts ===
Chart (1979–1980)	Peak position
Ireland (IRMA)	5
Netherlands (Single Top 100)	47
UK Singles (Official Charts)	6
US Billboard Hot 100	57

=== Certifications ===
Region	Certification	Certified units/sales
United Kingdom (BPI)	Gold	400,000^{‡}
^{‡} Sales+streaming figures based on certification alone.

== Other cover versions ==
- In 1978, the Illinois rock band Head East recorded and released a cover version of the song on their 1978 eponymous album, reaching No. 46 on the Billboard Hot 100. Head East's version of this song was their second-highest charting single.
- Alcatrazz, also fronted by Graham Bonnet, covered the song on the album Live Sentence with Yngwie Malmsteen on guitar, and yet another Bonnet-fronted outfit, Impellitteri, recorded it for their 1988 debut album Stand in Line.
- Brian May of Queen performed the song live on the Back to the Light tour in 1993, and it appears on the Live at the Brixton Academy multi-format release.
- Other cover versions include those by South African all-female band Clout on their 1978 album Substitute, a.k.a. Clout, and by former Runaways vocalist Cherie Currie as a duet with her sister Marie Currie on their 1980 album Messin' with the Boys. Their version reached No. 95 on the Billboard Hot 100.
