= All Night Long (Rainbow song) =

1980 single by Rainbow

- UK 7" vinyl single

Single by Rainbow

from the album Down to Earth
- B-side: "Weiss Heim"
- Released: 8 February 1980
- Genre: Hard rock; heavy metal
- Length: 3:53
- Label: Polydor
- Songwriters: Ritchie Blackmore; Roger Glover
- Producer: Roger Glover

Rainbow singles chronology
"Since You Been Gone" (1979)	"All Night Long" (1980)	"I Surrender" (1981)

"All Night Long" is a song by British rock band Rainbow. It was released as a single in 1980 from the band's fourth album Down to Earth and became their second top 10 hit in the UK, peaking at number 5 in the charts. It was the second single sung by Graham Bonnet for the band and his last, who along with drummer Cozy Powell, left after the Monsters of Rock festival in August 1980.

== Reception ==
In his review for Record Mirror, Simon Ludgate says that "this is a real corker. Completely over the top, stupid lyrics, Cozy Powell bashes away in what sounds like a large biscuit tin and I love it" and "imperative to play it loud and jump up and down, preferably smashing yourself over the head with a metal tea tray at the same time."

The song also came in for some criticism due to its overtly sexist lyrics. This prompted a double-page spread on sexism in music in a Sounds issue that September. In an issue released a month later, Blackmore appeared on the front cover dressed in stockings and suspenders, with the headline "Blackmore in new 'Black Stockings' Sexism Outrage", and this was likely a publicity stunt. He did say of the song's criticism:

"I think there's a lot of women who are very boring. Everybody knows it's all tongue in cheek, and anybody who doesn't know that isn't worth being talked about anyway. The whole world has always been men running after women, and the woman is the peacock going around with her feathers up, so that's the way it will always be no matter how many people go around trying to change it."

— Sounds, 11 October 1980

== Weiss Heim ==
The non-album B-side, "Weiss Heim" is an instrumental song, recorded in January 1980 at Sweet Silence Studios in Copenhagen. The name, meaning 'white home' in German (although grammatically wrong as the adjective lacks declension - correct would be "Weisses Heim"), comes from a moniker Blackmore had given his house he was living in at the time.

== Track listings ==
7" UK:

1. "All Night Long" – 3:50
2. "Weiss Heim" – 5:07

7" US:

1. "All Night Long" – 3:49
2. "Danger Zone" – 4:30

7" Netherlands:

1. "All Night Long" – 3:49
2. "No Time To Lose" – 3:41

== Charts ==
Chart (1980)	Peak position
Ireland (IRMA)	6
UK Singles (Official Charts)	5
US Billboard Hot 100	110

== Certifications ==
Region	Certification	Certified units/sales
United Kingdom (BPI)	Silver	250,000^{^}
^{^} Shipments figures based on certification alone.
