= Difficult to Cure =

- Cover design by Hipgnosis

Studio album by Rainbow
- Released: 9 February 1981
- Studios: Sweet Silence Studios, Copenhagen, Denmark; Kingdom Sound Studios, Long Island, New York
- Genre: Hard rock
- Length: 42:53
- Label: Polydor
- Producer: Roger Glover

Rainbow chronology
Down to Earth (1979)	Difficult to Cure (1981)	Jealous Lover (1981)

Singles from Difficult to Cure
- 1. "I Surrender" Released: 23 January 1981; 2. "Can't Happen Here" Released: 12 June 1981; 3. "Magic" Released: 1981 (Japan)

Professional ratings
Review scores
Source	Rating
AllMusic	2/5 stars
Collector's Guide to Heavy Metal	6/10

Difficult to Cure is the fifth studio album by the British hard rock band Rainbow, and it was released in 1981. It was the first album to feature drummer Bobby Rondinelli and vocalist Joe Lynn Turner after the departures of Cozy Powell and Graham Bonnet respectively, following the tour in support of Down to Earth. The album marked the continuing commercialization of the band's sound, with Ritchie Blackmore once describing at the time his appreciation of the band Foreigner. It became the band's highest-charting album on the UK Albums Chart, where it peaked at number three.

== Recording ==
Writing of the album's material was begun with singer Graham Bonnet still in the band, progressing as far as recording an early version of "I Surrender", before Bonnet left the band due to his dissatisfaction over the material, and numerous fallouts with Blackmore. American singer Joe Lynn Turner, formerly of Fandango was recruited and sang over already completed musical tracks. Turner stated that, because of this, he was singing in higher keys than he would do normally (and would do subsequently).

== Release ==
Allegedly, the album's cover (designed by Hipgnosis) had originally been proposed for use on Black Sabbath's 1978 release Never Say Die!. "I Surrender" would be the band's highest charting single in the UK, reaching No. 3.

The laughter at the end of the last track is a sample of Oliver Hardy from the short film released in 1934 "Them Thar Hills". On the original LP, the laughter is an endless loop as it plays in the run-out groove, while on CD it loops a few times before fading out.

A remastered CD reissue was released in May 1999, with packaging duplicating the original vinyl release.

== Track listing ==
Side one
No.	Title	Writer(s)	Length
1.	"I Surrender"	Russ Ballard	4:01
2.	"Spotlight Kid"	Ritchie Blackmore, Roger Glover	4:54
3.	"No Release"	Blackmore, Glover, Don Airey	5:33
4.	"Magic"	Brian Moran	4:07
5.	"Vielleicht Das Nächste Zeit (sic) (Maybe Next Time)" (instrumental)	Blackmore, Airey	3:17

Side two
No.	Title	Writer(s)	Length
6.	"Can't Happen Here"	Blackmore, Glover	4:57
7.	"Freedom Fighter"	Blackmore, Glover, Joe Lynn Turner	4:21
8.	"Midtown Tunnel Vision"	Blackmore, Glover, Turner	4:31
9.	"Difficult to Cure (Beethoven's Ninth)" (instrumental)	Ludwig van Beethoven, arr. by Blackmore, Glover, Airey	5:57

== Personnel ==
Rainbow

- Ritchie Blackmore – guitars
- Roger Glover – bass, producer
- Don Airey – keyboards
- Bobby Rondinelli – drums
- Joe Lynn Turner – vocals

Production

- Flemming Rasmussen – engineer
- Thomas Brekling, Clay Hutchinson – assistant engineers
- Greg Calbi – mastering

== Charts ==
Chart (1981)	Peak position
Australian Albums (Kent Music Report)	77
Dutch Albums (Album Top 100)	14
Finnish Albums (The Official Finnish Charts)	1
German Albums (Offizielle Top 100)	13
Japanese Albums (Oricon)	12
Norwegian Albums (VG-lista)	17
Swedish Albums (Sverigetopplistan)	9
UK Albums (Official Charts)	3
US Billboard 200	50

== Certifications ==
Region	Certification	Certified units/sales
Finland (Musiikkituottajat)	Gold	25,000
Japan (RIAJ)	Gold	100,000^{^}
United Kingdom (BPI)	Gold	100,000^{^}
^{^} Shipments figures based on certification alone.
