= Graham Bonnet discography =

- Studio albums: 29
- Live albums: 10
- Compilation albums: 17+
- Singles: 31

This is the discography of British rock singer and songwriter Graham Bonnet, both as a solo artist and as a band member.

== Albums ==
=== Studio albums ===
Title	Artist	Album details	Peak chart positions							
Title	Artist	Album details	UK	AUS	FIN	GER	NZ	SWE	SWI	US
The Marbles	The Marbles	Released: August 1970; Label: Cotillion, Polydor; Formats: LP	—	—	—	—	—	—	—	—
Graham Bonnet	Graham Bonnet	Released: September 1977; Label: Ring O', Mercury; Formats: LP, MC	—	7	—	—	11	—	—	—
No Bad Habits	Graham Bonnet	Released: September 1978; Label: Mercury; Formats: LP, MC	—	6	—	—	21	—	—	—
Down to Earth	Rainbow	Released: 3 August 1979; Label: Polydor; Formats: LP, MC, 8-track	6	27	26	19	—	17	—	66
Line-Up	Graham Bonnet	Released: November 1981; Label: Vertigo; Formats: LP, MC	62	—	24	—	—	—	—	—
Assault Attack	Michael Schenker Group	Released: October 1982; Label: Chrysalis; Formats: LP, MC	19	—	—	—	—	34	—	151
No Parole from Rock 'n' Roll	Alcatrazz	Released: 15 October 1983; Label: Rocshire; Formats: LP, MC	—	—	—	—	—	—	—	128
Disturbing the Peace	Alcatrazz	Released: 22 March 1985; Label: Capitol; Formats: LP, MC	—	—	—	—	—	—	—	145
Dangerous Games	Alcatrazz	Released: September 1986; Label: Capitol; Formats: LP, MC	—	—	—	—	—	—	—	—
Stand in Line	Impellitteri	Released: June 1988; Label: Relativity, Music for Nations; Formats: CD, LP, MC	—	—	—	—	—	—	—	91
Forcefield III: To Oz and Back	Forcefield	Released: November 1989; Label: President; Formats: CD, LP, MC	—	—	—	—	—	—	—	—
Forcefield IV: Let the Wild Run Free	Forcefield	Released: 1990; Label: President; Formats: CD, LP, MC	—	—	—	—	—	—	—	—
Here Comes the Night	Graham Bonnet	Released: 5 August 1991; Label: President; Formats: CD, LP	—	—	—	—	—	—	—	—
Afterlife	Blackthorne	Released: 1993; Label: CMC, Music for Nations; Formats: CD, LP, MC	—	—	—	—	—	—	—	—
Underground	Graham Bonnet	Released: 21 August 1997; Label: Victor; Formats: CD	—	—	—	—	—	—	—	—
The Day I Went Mad	Graham Bonnet	Released: 23 June 1999; Label: Victor; Formats: CD	—	—	—	—	—	—	—	—
Heavy Metal Anthem	Anthem	Released: 21 April 2000; Label: Victor; Formats: CD	—	—	—	—	—	—	—	—
System X	Impellitteri	Released: 21 March 2002; Label: Victor; Formats: CD	—	—	—	—	—	—	—	—
Welcome to America!	Taz Taylor Band	Released: 28 August 2006; Label: Escape Music; Formats: CD	—	—	—	—	—	—	—	—
Private I – The Archives Vol. 1	Graham Bonnet	Released: 20 January 2015; Label: Graham Bonnet Music; Formats: digital download; Unreleased album from 1975	—	—	—	—	—	—	—	—
Blackthorne II – Don't Kill the Thrill	Blackthorne	Released: 2 September 2016; Label: Cherry Red; Formats: 2xCD; Unreleased album from 1994	—	—	—	—	—	—	—	—
The Book	Graham Bonnet Band	Released: 28 October 2016; Label: Frontiers Music, Ward; Formats: CD, digital download	—	—	—	—	—	—	—	—
Feeding the Beast	EZoo	Released: 2 June 2017; Label: earMusic, Ward; Formats: CD, digital download	—	—	—	—	—	—	—	—
Resurrection	Michael Schenker Fest	Released: 28 February 2018; Label: Nuclear Blast, Ward; Formats: CD, CD+DVD, LP, digital download; Tracks 2, 4, 6 and 12	86	—	—	10	—	—	16	—
Reel To Real: The Archives 1987–1992	Graham Bonnet	Released: 29 June 2018; Label: Cherry Red; Formats: 3xCD box set; Recordings from 1987, 1989 and 1992	—	—	—	—	—	—	—	—
Meanwhile, Back in the Garage	Graham Bonnet Band	Released: 4 July 2018; Label: Frontiers Music, Nexus; Formats: CD, 2xLP, digital download	—	—	—	—	—	—	87	—
Revelation	Michael Schenker Fest	Released: 20 September 2019; Label: Nuclear Blast, Ward; Formats: CD, 2xLP, digital download; Tracks 1, 4, 5, 11 and 12	—	—	—	32	—	—	38	—
Born Innocent	Alcatrazz	Released: 31 July 2020; Label: Silver Lining Music, Ward; Formats: CD, digital download	—	—	—	—	—	—	36	—
Explosive!!: Studio Jam	Anthem	Released: 7 September 2020; Label: Ward; Formats: CD; Limited release	—	—	—	—	—	—	—	—
Day Out in Nowhere	Graham Bonnet Band	Released: 13 May 2022; Label: Frontiers Music; Formats: CD, LP, digital download	—	—	—	—	—	—	—	—
"—" denotes releases that did not chart or were not released in that territory.

=== Live albums ===
Title	Artist	Album details	Peak chart positions	
Title	Artist	Album details	GER	US
Live Sentence	Alcatrazz	Released: May 1984; Label: Rocshire; Formats: LP, MC	—	133
Live '83	Alcatrazz	Released: 1 November 2009; Label: Deadline Music; Formats: CD, LP, digital download	—	—
Disturbing the Peace Tour – Live in Japan 1984.10.10 Audio Tracks	Alcatrazz	Released: 28 April 2010; Label: Ward; Formats: CD	—	—
Down to Earth Tour 1979	Rainbow	Released: 21 August 2015; Label: Cleopatra; Formats: 3xCD, digital download	—	—
Escape from Alcatrazz: Alive in Japan	Graham Bonnet Band	Released: 9 February 2016; Label: Graham Bonnet Music; Formats: digital download	—	—
Monsters of Rock – Live at Donington 1980	Rainbow	Released: 15 April 2016; Label: Eagle Rock, Ward; Formats: CD+DVD, 2xCD+DVD, digital download	54	—
Frontiers Rock Festival 2016 – Live... Here Comes the Night	Graham Bonnet Band	Released: 23 June 2017; Label: Frontiers Music, Ward; Formats: CD, CD+DVD, digital download	—	—
Live – Tokyo International Forum Hall A	Michael Schenker Fest	Released: 24 March 2017; Label: in-akustik; Formats: 2xCD, 2xLP, digital download; Tracks 9, 10, 11 and 18	—	—
Parole Denied – Tokyo 2017	Alcatrazz	Released: 28 November 2018; Label: Frontiers Music, Nexus; Formats: 2xCD+DVD, digital download	—	—
Live in Tokyo 2017	Graham Bonnet Band	Released: 10 July 2019; Label: Frontiers Music, Nexus; Formats: 2xCD+DVD	—	—
"—" denotes releases that did not chart or were not released in that territory.

=== Compilations ===
Title	Artist	Album details	Peak chart positions				
Title	Artist	Album details	UK	FIN	GER	SWE	US
Can't Complain	Graham Bonnet	Released: 1979; Label: Mercury; Formats: LP; Germany-only release	—	—	—	—	—
The Best Of	Graham Bonnet	Released: 1979; Label: Mercury; Formats: LP; New Zealand-only release	—	—	—	—	—
Rock Legends	Graham Bonnet	Released: 1980; Label: Mercury; Formats: LP; Australia-only release	—	—	—	—	—
Finyl Vinyl	Rainbow	Released: February 1986; Label: Polydor, Mercury; Formats: 2xCD, 2xLP, 2xMC; Tracks 7 and 8	31	35	—	25	87
The Rock Singer's Anthology	Graham Bonnet	Released: 25 April 1990; Label: Vertigo; Formats: CD	—	—	—	—	—
The Very Best of Rainbow	Rainbow	Released: July 1997; Label: Polydor; Formats: CD, MC	197	—	—	—	—
The Best of Alcatrazz	Alcatrazz	Released: 23 June 1998; Label: Renaissance, Dream Catcher; Formats: CD, MC	—	—	—	—	—
The Very Best of Impellitteri: Faster Than the Speed of Light	Impellitteri	Released: 8 October 2002; Label: Victor; Formats: CD	—	—	—	—	—
The Best of the Michael Schenker Group 1980–1984	Michael Schenker Group	Released: 23 September 2008; Label: Chrysalis; Formats: CD	—	—	—	—	—
A Collection	Graham Bonnet	Released: 2 December 2014; Label: Floating World; Formats: CD	—	—	—	—	—
A Light in the Black 1975–1984	Rainbow	Released: 23 January 2015; Label: Polydor, Universal Music; Formats: 5xCD box set, digital download	—	—	39	—	—
The Ultimate Fortress Rock Set	Alcatrazz	Released: 25 March 2016; Label: The Store for Music; Formats: 5xCD box set, digital download	—	—	—	—	—
Anthology 1968–2017	Graham Bonnet	Released: 28 April 2017; Label: Hear No Evil Recordings; Formats: 2xCD+DVD box set	—	—	—	—	—
Breaking the Heart of the City: The Best of Alcatrazz	Alcatrazz	Released: 27 October 2017; Label: Hear No Evil Recordings; Formats: 3xCD box set, digital download	—	—	—	—	—
Flying Not Falling 1991–1999	Graham Bonnet	Released: 24 November 2017; Label: Hear No Evil Recordings; Formats: 3xCD box set, digital download	—	—	—	—	—
The Official Bootleg Box Set 1983–1986	Alcatrazz	Released: 30 November 2018; Label: Hear No Evil Recordings; Formats: 6xCD box set, digital download	—	—	—	—	—
Solo Albums 1974–1992	Graham Bonnet	Released: 27 November 2020; Label: Hear No Evil Recordings; Formats: 6xCD box set, digital download	—	—	—	—	—
"—" denotes releases that did not chart or were not released in that territory.

== Singles ==
Name	Artist	Year	Peak chart positions							Album
Name	Artist	Year	UK	AUS	FIN	IRE	NL	NZ	US	Album
"Only One Woman"	The Marbles	1968	5	23	—	8	3	1	—	The Marbles
"The Walls Fell Down"	The Marbles	1969	28	71	—	—	2	10	—	The Marbles
"I Can't See Nobody"	The Marbles	1969	—	—	—	—	23	—	—	The Marbles
"Breaking Up Is Hard to Do"	The Marbles	1970	—	—	—	—	—	—	—	The Marbles
"Whisper in the Night"	Graham Bonnet	1972	—	—	—	—	—	—	—	Back Row in the Stalls (Released 2016)
"Trying to Say Goodbye"	Graham Bonnet	1973	—	—	—	—	—	—	—	Back Row in the Stalls (Released 2016)
"Back Row in the Stalls"	Graham Bonnet	1974	—	—	—	—	—	—	—	Back Row in the Stalls (Released 2016)
"Dreams (Out in the Forest)"	Billy Beethoven	1975	—	—	—	—	—	—	—	Three for All
"It's All Over Now, Baby Blue"	Graham Bonnet	1977	—	3	—	—	—	3	—	Graham Bonnet
"Danny"	Graham Bonnet	1977	—	79	—	—	—	—	—	Graham Bonnet
"Goodnight and Goodmorning"	Graham Bonnet	1977	—	—	—	—	—	—	—	Graham Bonnet
"Rock Island Line" (Australia-only release)	Graham Bonnet	1978	—	—	—	—	—	—	—	Graham Bonnet
"Warm Ride"	Graham Bonnet	1978	—	2	—	—	—	6	—	Non-album single
"Only You Can Lift Me" (Australia and New Zealand-only release)	Graham Bonnet	1978	—	—	—	—	—	—	—	No Bad Habits
"Can't Complain" (Continental Europe-only release)	Graham Bonnet	1978	—	—	—	—	—	—	—	No Bad Habits
"Since You Been Gone"	Rainbow	1979	6	—	—	5	47	—	57	Down to Earth
"All Night Long"	Rainbow	1980	5	—	—	6	—	—	110	Down to Earth
"Night Games"	Graham Bonnet	1981	6	—	10	3	—	—	—	Line-Up
"I'm a Lover" (Finland-only release)	Graham Bonnet	1981	—	—	—	—	—	—	—	Line-Up
"Liar"	Graham Bonnet	1981	51	—	—	—	—	—	—	Line-Up
"Bad Days Are Gone" (Japan-only release)	Graham Bonnet	1981	—	—	—	—	—	—	—	No Bad Habits
"That's the Way It Is"	Graham Bonnet	1981	—	—	—	—	—	—	—	Line-Up
"Set Me Free" (Japan-only release)	Graham Bonnet	1981	—	—	—	—	—	—	—	Line-Up
"Anthony Boy" (Continental Europe-only release)	Graham Bonnet	1981	—	—	—	—	—	—	—	Line-Up
"Dancer"	Michael Schenker Group	1982	52	—	—	—	—	—	—	Assault Attack
"Island in the Sun"	Alcatrazz	1983	—	—	—	—	—	—	—	No Parole from Rock 'n Roll
"God Bless Video"	Alcatrazz	1985	—	—	—	—	—	—	—	Disturbing the Peace
"Gypsy Ways (Win, Lose or Draw)" (Japan-only release)	Anthem	2000	—	—	—	—	—	—	—	Heavy Metal Anthem
"My Kingdom"	Graham Bonnet Band	2015	—	—	—	—	—	—	—	Non-album single
"Hippie Heart Gypsy Soul"	Wishing Well feat. Graham Bonnet	2016	—	—	—	—	—	—	—	Chasing Rainbows by Wishing Well
"Warrior"	Michael Schenker Fest	2018	—	—	—	—	—	—	—	Resurrection
"Night Games" (Japan-only release)	Hideki Saijo with Anthem feat. Graham Bonnet	2020	—	—	—	—	—	—	—	Explosive!!: Studio Jam
"Imposter"	Graham Bonnet Band	2022	—	—	—	—	—	—	—	Day Out in Nowhere
"Uncle John"	Graham Bonnet Band	2022	—	—	—	—	—	—	—	Day Out in Nowhere
"Eyes Grow Wide"	Gordian feat. Graham Bonnet	2025	—	—	—	—	—	—	—	Non-album single
"—" denotes releases that did not chart or were not released in that territory.

== Album appearances (guest sessions) ==
Date	Artist	Label	Cat. #	Name	Contribution
1976	(Various Artists)	RCA	RS 1088	Paul Gallico's the Snow Goose	Vocals on "Walking by the Sea"
1983	The Royal Philharmonic Orchestra and Friends	RCA	RCALP 8001	Arrested: The Music of the Police	Vocals on "Truth Hits Everybody"
1985	Eddie Hardin and Zak Starkey	President	PTLS 1078	Eddie Hardin and Zak Starkey'sMusical Version of Wind in the Willows	
1987	Pretty Maids	CBS	4502811	Future World	
1992	Eddie Hardin	INAK	INAK 9010	Wind in the Willows – A Rock Concert	
2005	Iain Ashley Hersey	Lion Music	LMC 157	The Holy Grail	Vocals on "Going Down", "Walking the Talk" and "The Holy Grail"
27 Mar 2006	Michael Schenker Group	Armageddon Music		Tales of Rock'n'Roll	Vocals on "Rock 'n' Roll"
2006	Moonstone Project	Majestic Rock Records	MAJCD-080 (UK) DDCZ-1244 (Japan)	Time to Take a Stand	Vocals on "Not Dead Yet"
4 Dec 2007	(Various Artists)	Phantom Sound and Vision		The Countdown Spectacular Live 2	Vocals on "It's All Over Now Baby Blue"
16 Aug 2008	J21		0001	Yellow Mind:Blue Mind	
2010	Lyraka	Yesterrock	B004CU1JPY	Lyraka Volume 1	Vocals on "Coronation", "Palace Guard", "Errandia" and "Beyond the Palace"
2012	Lyraka	Yesterrock		Lyraka Volume 2	Vocals on "Volcano", "Lyraka (On Dragon's Wings)" and "Father"
2012	Osmo's Cosmos	AXR Music		Show	Vocals on "Seven Years"
2014	Stardust Reverie	Avispa		Ancient Rites of the Moon	
2014	(Various Artists)	Purple Pyramid Records		Light My Fire: A Classic Rock Salute to the Doors	"The Soft Parade"
2015	Stardust Reverie	Rock-CD		Proclamation of Shadows	
