= Trevor Gordon =

British-Australian singer (1948–2013)

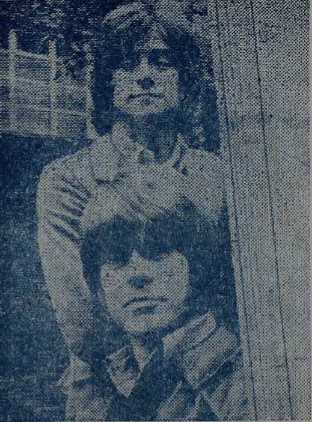
- Gordon (bottom) with Graham Bonnet as the duo The Marbles in 1969

Background information
- Birth name: Trevor Gordon Grunnill
- Born: 19 May 1948; Blackpool, Lancashire, England
- Origin: Sydney, Australia
- Died: 10 January 2013 (aged 64); London, England
- Genres: Rock and roll, soft rock, baroque pop
- Occupation(s): Singer, songwriter, musician
- Instrument(s): Vocals, guitar
- Years active: 1964–2013
- Formerly of: Bee Gees, The Blue Sect, The Graham Bonnet Set, The Marbles

Trevor Gordon Grunnill (19 May 1948 – 10 January 2013) was a British-Australian singer, songwriter and musician. He was one half of the late-1960s musical duo the Marbles, along with Graham Bonnet, whose biggest hit was the UK No. 5 charting track "Only One Woman", and their minor UK hit (but a top three in the Netherlands) "The Walls Fell Down".

His professional career started in Australia in the early 1960s, playing on a few of the early records released by Bee Gees.

== Early life ==
Gordon was born in Blackpool, Lancashire, England, as Trevor Gordon Grunnill. He would drop his surname "Grunnill" when he began playing on and releasing records professionally. He emigrated to Sydney, Australia, with his family in the late 1950s.

== Career ==
=== Early career and Bee Gees ===
While still in high school, Gordon found work as a boy singer on the popular "Johnny O'Keefe" TV show leading to an exclusive contract with ABC, the Australian Television Network. This led to many live and TV appearances and Gordon was eventually made the host of his own Saturday afternoon kid's television program. During this time he met and befriended Barry, Maurice and Robin Gibb who were finding their own success in Australia as the Bee Gees. Gordon played lead guitar on several early Bees Gees tracks that appeared on the Bee Gees first album, The Bee Gees Sing and Play 14 Barry Gibb Songs. Gordon secured a record contract with Leedon Records and released the singles, "House Without Windows" and "And I'll Be Happy" (both songs written by Barry Gibb and credited to 'Trevor Gordon and the Bee Gees'), In 1965, Gordon recorded other Barry Gibb compositions: "Little Miss Rhythm and Blues" and "Here I Am".

=== The Marbles ===
After returning to London in 1967, Gordon teamed up musically with his first cousin Graham Bonnet and eventually the pair became a musical duo called the Marbles. Not long after Gordon reconnected with his old mates, the Bee Gees, by now also in London and fast becoming international recording stars. The Gibbs helped Gordon and Bonnet secure a recording contract with the Australian record impresario, Robert Stigwood. Barry Gibb, Robin Gibb and Maurice Gibb wrote six songs for the Marbles and also provided some background vocals on their recordings, the most successful being the hit, "Only One Woman". With Bonnet's powerful vocals taking over the Marbles sound, Gordon felt under utilized and the duo soon disbanded. Gordon secured a contract with Polydor Records in London and released one album called Alphabet. Gordon was also a cast member of the Billy Cotton TV program in the UK before giving up performing and becoming a music teacher.

The Marbles were typical one-hit wonders because "Only One Woman" became their one and only major hit. It reached number 5 in the UK Singles Chart in November 1968, Following the release of the group's debut single, Bonnet made a remark to a reporter as to "Only One Woman" being a bit boring, angering Barry Gibb. Their second single "The Walls Fell Down" only reached number 28 in the same chart. But in the Netherlands it was more successful, where it reached number 3 in their Top 40 in April 1969.

== Later career ==
In 1970, Gordon released his first and only solo album Alphabet on Polydor Records. He also released two singles: "House Without Windows" and "Little Miss Rhythm and Blues". He later became a secondary school music teacher in London. His Marbles duo, Graham Bonnet, would later find success as a member of the group Rainbow.

Before his death, Gordon wrote and published a book called Caged for Jazz Guitar – A Chord Shaped Approach to Jazz Mastery.

== Death ==
On 10 January 2013, after not being heard from for several weeks, Gordon was found dead in his London flat. His high school friend, singer/film director, Peter Foldy, called London police from Los Angeles, asking them to check up on Gordon. Says Foldy in a press release: "Trevor was a sweet, funny guy with tons of talent. He will be missed." The cause of death has not been announced pending an autopsy by the West London coroner's office in Fulham, but Gordon's death was thought to be from natural causes.

== Discography ==
=== The Marbles ===
Studio albums

- The Marbles (1970)

Singles

- Only One Woman b/w By the Light of a Burning Candle (1968)
- The Walls Fell Down b/w Love You (1969)
- I Can't See Nobody b/w Little Boy (1969)
- Breaking Up Is Hard to Do b/w I Can't See Nobody (1970)
- Breaking Up Is Hard to Do b/w Daytime (1970)
- Breaking Up Is Hard to Do b/w A House Is Not a Home (1970)
- Breaking Up Is Hard to Do b/w Little Laughing Girl (1970)

=== Solo ===
Studio albums

- Alphabet (1970)

Singles

- House Without Windows (1970)
- Little Miss Rhythm and Blues (1970)
