= Eternal Warrior (album) =

Studio album by Anthem
- Released: July 21, 2004
- Recorded: 2004
- Genre: Heavy metal
- Length: 51:09
- Label: JVC Victor
- Producer: Naoto Shibata

Anthem chronology
Live' Melt Down (2003)	Eternal Warrior (2004)	Immortal (2006)

Eternal Warrior is the eleventh studio album by the Japanese heavy metal band Anthem, released on July 21, 2004. The band released this album after 2 years of intensive touring and planning. Like their previous studio album Overload, this album follows the same aggressive direction. It debuted at No. 42 on the Oricon Weekly Albums Chart.

== Track listing ==
1. "Onslaught" (Shibata) - 5:12
2. "Eternal Warrior" (Shibata) - 5:05
3. "Soul Cry" (Shibata) - 4:08
4. "Life Goes On" (Shibata) - 6:00
5. "Let the New Day Come" (Shibata) - 4:49
6. "Distress" (Shimizu) - 5:56
7. "Bleeding" (Shibata) - 4:05
8. "Omega Man" (Shimizu) - 4:05
9. "Easy Mother" (Shibata) - 4:40
10. "Mind Slide" (Shibata) - 7:03

== Personnel ==
- Eizo Sakamoto - vocals
- Akio Shimizu - guitars
- Naoto Shibata - bass, producer
- Hirotsugu Homma - drums

== Charts ==
Chart (2004)	Peak position
Japanese Albums (Oricon)	42
