= List of number-one singles in 1969 (New Zealand) =

This is a list of number-one hit singles in 1969 in New Zealand, starting with the first chart dated, 17 January 1969.

== Chart ==
Week	Artist	Title
3 January 1969	Summer break - no chart	Summer break - no chart
10 January 1969	Summer break - no chart	Summer break - no chart
17 January 1969	Diana Ross & the Supremes	"Love Child"
24 January 1969	Diana Ross & the Supremes	"Love Child"
31 January 1969	The Scaffold	"Lily The Pink"
7 February 1969	Lulu	"I'm a Tiger"
14 February 1969	Barry Ryan	"Eloise"
21 February 1969	Dave Dee, Dozy, Beaky, Mick & Tich	"The Wreck of the 'Antoinette'"
28 February 1969	Marmalade	"Ob-La-Di, Ob-La-Da"
7 March 1969	The Marbles	"Only One Woman"
14 March 1969	The Beatles	"Ob-La-Di, Ob-La-Da"
21 March 1969	Bee Gees	"I Started a Joke"
28 March 1969	Bee Gees	"I Started a Joke"
3 April 1969	Manfred Mann	"Fox on the Run"
10 April 1969	Rebels	"My Son John"
17 April 1969	Rebels	"My Son John"
24 April 1969	John Rowles	"M'Lady"
1 May 1969	Tommy James & the Shondells	"Crimson & Clover"
8 May 1969	Tommy James & the Shondells	"Crimson & Clover"
15 May 1969	Tommy James & the Shondells	"Crimson & Clover"
22 May 1969	Peter Sarstedt	"Where Do You Go To (My Lovely)?"
29 May 1969	Peter Sarstedt	"Where Do You Go To (My Lovely)?"
5 June 1969	The Beatles	"Get Back"
12 June 1969	The Beatles	"Get Back"
20 June 1969	The Cowsills	"Hair"
27 June 1969	The Cowsills	"Hair"
4 July 1969	The Cowsills	"Hair"
11 July 1969	The Cowsills	"Hair"
18 July 1969	Elvis Presley	"In the Ghetto"
25 July 1969	Elvis Presley	"In the Ghetto"
1 August 1969	Elvis Presley	"In the Ghetto"
8 August 1969	Elvis Presley	"In the Ghetto"
15 August 1969	Creedence Clearwater Revival	"Bad Moon Rising"
22 August 1969	Tommy Roe	"Heather Honey"
29 August 1969	Creedence Clearwater Revival	"Bad Moon Rising"
5 September 1969	Zager & Evans	"In The Year 2525"
12 September 1969	Zager & Evans	"In The Year 2525"
19 September 1969	Rolling Stones	"Honky Tonk Women"
26 September 1969	Shane	"Saint Paul"
3 October 1969	Shane	"Saint Paul"
10 October 1969	Shane	"Saint Paul"
17 October 1969	Shane	"Saint Paul"
24 October 1969	Shane	"Saint Paul"
31 October 1969	Shane	"Saint Paul"
7 November 1969	Robin Gibb	"Saved by the Bell"
14 November 1969	Hi Revving Tongues	"Rain & Tears"
21 November 1969	The Beatles	"Something"
28 November 1969	The Beatles	"Something"
5 December 1969	Bee Gees	"Don't Forget to Remember"
12 December 1969	Bee Gees	"Don't Forget to Remember"
19 December 1969	Elvis Presley	"Suspicious Minds"
26 December 1969	The Beatles	"Come Together"
