= Anthem (band) =

Japanese heavy metal band

- Origin: Tokyo, Japan
- Genre: Heavy metal
- Years active: 1981–1992, 2000–present
- Labels: Victor, King, Universal, Nuclear Blast
- Members: Naoto Shibata; Akio Shimizu; Isamu Tamaru; Yukio Morikawa
- Past members: Takamasa Ohuchi; Hiroya Fukuda; Eizo Sakamoto; Toshihito Maeda; Akifumi Koyanagi; Hideaki Nakama; Hirotsugu Homma; Graham Bonnet
- Website: heavymetalanthem.com

Anthem (アンセム, Ansemu) is a Japanese heavy metal band that was formed during the early 1980s in Tokyo. They are among the many heavy metal bands founded in Japan during that time and are considered to be one of the most successful and influential, alongside Loudness and Earthshaker.

== History ==
=== Early years (1981–1985) ===
Anthem was founded in Tokyo during 1980 as a quartet, composed of singer Toshihito Maeda, guitarist Akifumi Koyanagi, bass player Naoto Shibata (also known as "Ski") and drummer Takamasa Ohuchi. Koyanagi left in late 1983 to be replaced by Hiroya Fukuda. In December 1984, vocalist Toshihito Maeda also left and Anthem drafted Eizo Sakamoto for their debut eponymous album, issued in July 1985 by Nexus and licensed to Europe via Roadrunner Records.

=== Success (1985–1992) ===
Their first studio release featured classic songs like "Wild Anthem" and "Warning Action". Their first EP single in 1986, entitled "Xanadu", was the first known song to be used for promotion of a brand new video game, namely Nihon Falcom's computer RPG Dragon Slayer II: Xanadu. Their second album, Tightrope, released 21 April 1986, showcased a more catchy, melodic sound with an improved vocal performance by Sakamoto. Bound to Break was to be the last album featuring Eizo Sakamoto for nearly two decades. The album was full of classics ("Empty Eyes", "Bound to Break", "Soldiers") and introduced the band's long-time world-famous producer, Chris Tsangarides (perhaps best known for producing Judas Priest's classic 1990 album, Painkiller). With the departure of Sakamoto in 1988, Shibata recruited Yukio Morikawa to the band's vocal position. With Morikawa came the album Gypsy Ways, considered the band's most popular album. Morikawa's voice made the band a great success at that time and he was similar in style, vocal range and ability to Graham Bonnet. In 1989, the album Hunting Time was released and the song "The Juggler" was used as a PV. In the beginning of 90s, Anthem dealt with another departure: after the album No Smoke Without Fire was completed, this time without the band's staple producer / engineer Chris Tsangarides, Hiroya Fukuda (guitar) left and was replaced by Hideaki 'Shadow Walker' Nakama. Hideaki Nakama left the band after the tour was done and the search for a new guitarist began.

=== Disbandment (1992–2000) ===
After many auditions, the young Akio Shimizu joined the band to replace Nakama. In 1992, the band released Domestic Booty. However, classic-style heavy metal was out of fashion in the early 90s, and with the explosion of grunge in the U.S. and the visual kei movement in Japanese music, Shibata decided to put an end to the band. The members of Anthem followed the album's release with a tour covering many cities of Japan and released the VHS/CD Last Anthem: Live recorded at Nissin Power Station, which was the band's last show for nearly eight years.

=== Reform (2000–2011) ===
After the long hiatus, Anthem returned in 2000, with the album Heavy Metal Anthem which featured the vocalist Graham Bonnet (former lead singer of Rainbow and Alcatrazz). The album is entirely composed by classic songs of the band rearranged with English lyrics. The lineup on Heavy Metal Anthem was: Graham Bonnet (vocals), Naoto Shibata (bass), Akio Shimizu (guitar) and Takamasa Oouchi (drums).

Later, Hirotsugu Homma (who had played together with Shibata in Loudness) replaced Takamasa Oouchi on drums and Eizo Sakamoto returned to the vocals. In 2001, they released Seven Hills. In 2002 came Overload, which is considered by most critics to be much more aggressive than Seven Hills. In 2003, the band recorded Live' Melt Down at Citta Club Kawasaki. In 2004 the band released the single "Onslaught" followed by the album Eternal Warrior, which continued in the same sound direction as Overload. In 2005, Anthem celebrated their twentieth anniversary with a special tour, where all members of the band since 1985 played the band songs in their respective formations. The Kawasaki show of this tour was filmed and released on DVD as "20th Anniversary Tour".

In 2006 Anthem released Immortal, followed by the single and PV of "Immortal Bind". The most recent output has seen Anthem push even further into the Power Metal-tinged style showcased on Domestic Booty and Eternal Warrior with 2008's Black Empire. A PV of "Heat of the Night" was released shortly after the album hit in November 2008 and has thus far garnered even more positive critical reviews than Immortal.

Their much anticipated album Heraldic Device was released in 2011. This was their last album with record label company JVC.

=== 2012–present ===
As of 2012, Anthem has signed with record label Universal Music and has released a new single "Evil One" in September 2012 and following with an album, Burning Oath, that was released in October 2012.

On 10 January 2013, the band announced it was on hiatus after Shibata was diagnosed with stomach cancer. The bassist declared that he was cancer-free and healthy as of 2021. After the recovery of Shibata the band played a couple of return shows in July 2013 with the Live Circus Tour following these again in September and October 2013.

In February 2014 singer Eizo Sakamoto left the band for a second time and was replaced by former singer Yukio Morikawa. The group also announced that drummer Isamu Tamaru, who had been filling in as a guest drummer for the band since 2012, would replace Homma as the permanent member. Production of a new album will start in the spring. A kick off tour with the new line-up was also undertaken: 7/19 Nagoya, 7/26 Osaka, 8/2 Kawasaki.

Absolute World, Yukio Morikawa's first album as the band's vocalist since Domestic Booty in 1992, was released on 22 October 2014. The band toured throughout November in support of the album.

On 17 April, the band announced through its website, the title of their next album, Engraved, which was released 21 June 2017. A video was released for the single, "The Artery Song."

The band announced that their greatest hits album, Nucleus, which will feature English-language versions of their songs, will be released on 29 March 2019 by Nuclear Blast Records. On 17 December 2018, the band released "Black Empire", originally sung by Eizo Sakamoto and now by Yukio Morikawa, as the first single off the album. Anthem announced an Anthem 2001 vs. Anthem 2021 tour for 2021 in which old and current members appeared on stage.

== Members ==
=== Current members ===
- Yukio Morikawa: lead vocals (1988–1992, 2014–present)
- Akio Shimizu: guitars, backing vocals (1991–1992, 2000–present)
- Naoto Shibata: bass, backing vocals (1981–1992, 2000–present)
- Isamu Tamaru: drums (2012–present)

=== Former members ===
- Toshihito Maeda: lead vocals (1981–1984)
- Eizo Sakamoto: lead vocals (1984–1988, 2000–2014)
- Akifumi Koyanagi: guitars (1981–1983)
- Hiroya Fukuda: guitars (1983–1990)
- Hideaki Nakama: guitars (1990–1991)
- Takamasa Ohuchi: drums (1981–1992)
- Hirotsugu Homma: drums (2000–2012)

== Discography ==
=== Studio albums ===
Year	Title	Member			
Year	Title	Vocals	Guitars	Bass	Drums
1985	Anthem	Eizo Sakamoto	Hiroya Fukuda	Naoto Shibata	Takamasa Ohuchi
1985	Ready to Ride EP	Eizo Sakamoto	Hiroya Fukuda	Naoto Shibata	Takamasa Ohuchi
1986	Tightrope	Eizo Sakamoto	Hiroya Fukuda	Naoto Shibata	Takamasa Ohuchi
1987	Bound to Break	Eizo Sakamoto	Hiroya Fukuda	Naoto Shibata	Takamasa Ohuchi
1988	Gypsy Ways	Yukio Morikawa	Hiroya Fukuda	Naoto Shibata	Takamasa Ohuchi
1989	Hunting Time	Yukio Morikawa	Hiroya Fukuda	Naoto Shibata	Takamasa Ohuchi
1990	No Smoke Without Fire	Yukio Morikawa	Hiroya Fukuda	Naoto Shibata	Takamasa Ohuchi
1992	Domestic Booty	Yukio Morikawa	Akio Shimizu	Naoto Shibata	Takamasa Ohuchi
2000	Heavy Metal Anthem	Graham Bonnet	Akio Shimizu	Naoto Shibata	Takamasa Ohuchi
2001	Seven Hills	Eizo Sakamoto	Akio Shimizu	Naoto Shibata	Hirotsugu Homma
2002	Overload	Eizo Sakamoto	Akio Shimizu	Naoto Shibata	Hirotsugu Homma
2004	Eternal Warrior	Eizo Sakamoto	Akio Shimizu	Naoto Shibata	Hirotsugu Homma
2006	Immortal	Eizo Sakamoto	Akio Shimizu	Naoto Shibata	Hirotsugu Homma
2008	Black Empire	Eizo Sakamoto	Akio Shimizu	Naoto Shibata	Hirotsugu Homma
2011	Heraldic Device	Eizo Sakamoto	Akio Shimizu	Naoto Shibata	Hirotsugu Homma
2012	Burning Oath	Eizo Sakamoto	Akio Shimizu	Naoto Shibata	Hirotsugu Homma
2014	Absolute World	Yukio Morikawa	Akio Shimizu	Naoto Shibata	Isamu Tamaru
2017	Engraved	Yukio Morikawa	Akio Shimizu	Naoto Shibata	Isamu Tamaru
2019	Nucleus	Yukio Morikawa	Akio Shimizu	Naoto Shibata	Isamu Tamaru
2020	Explosive!!: Studio Jam	Graham Bonnet Yukio Morikawa	Akio Shimizu	Naoto Shibata	Isamu Tamaru
2023	Crimson & Jet Black	Yukio Morikawa	Akio Shimizu	Naoto Shibata	Isamu Tamaru

=== Live albums ===
Year	Title	Member			
Year	Title	Vocals	Guitars	Bass	Drums
1987	The Show Carries On!	Eizo Sakamoto	Hiroya Fukuda	Naoto Shibata	Takamasa Ohuchi
1992	Last Anthem	Yukio Morikawa	Akio Shimizu	Naoto Shibata	Takamasa Ohuchi
2003	Live' Melt Down	Eizo Sakamoto	Akio Shimizu	Naoto Shibata	Hirotsugu Homma
2005	The Show Carries On! – Complete Version	Eizo Sakamoto	Hiroya Fukuda	Naoto Shibata	Takamasa Ohuchi
2005	Prologue Live Boxx	Eizo Sakamoto	Akio Shimizu	Naoto Shibata	Hirotsugu Homma
2010	Prologue Live Boxx 2	Eizo Sakamoto	Akio Shimizu	Naoto Shibata	Hirotsugu Homma
2015	Trimetallic	Yukio Morikawa	Akio Shimizu	Naoto Shibata	Isamu Tamaru

=== Compilations ===
- 1990: Best 1981–1990
- 1992: Best II 1981–1992
- 1998: The Very Best of Anthem
- 2001: Anthem Ways
- 2005: Official Bootleg (CD version)
- 2005: Official Bootleg (boxed set)
- 2007: Core: Best of Anthem 2000–2007
- 2015: Anthems 2000–2011 (2CDs + DVD)
- 2019: Nucleus

=== Singles ===
Year	Title	Album
1986	Xanadu	Non-album Single
1990	Love on the Edge	No Smoke Without Fire
2000	Gypsy Ways (Win, Lose or Draw)	Heavy Metal Anthem
2001	Grieve of Heart	Seven Hills
2002	The Voices	Overload
2004	Onslaught	Eternal Warrior
2006	Immortal Bind	Immortal
2008	Heat of the Night	Black Empire
2012	Evil One	Burning Oath
2013	Blast	Non-album Single
2014	Shine On	Absolute World
2017	The Artery Song	Engraved
2019	Black Empire	Nucleus

=== Video/DVD ===
- 1987: The Show Carries On
- 2001: Back Then
- 2003: Live' Melt Down: The Show Still Carries On
- 2005: Anthem 20th Anniversary Tour 2005
- 2009: Live Immortal
- 2013: Live Unbroken
- 2016: 30+
