= Only One Woman =

1968 single by the Marbles

Single by the Marbles
- B-side: "By the Light of a Burning Candle"
- Released: 1968
- Recorded: July 1968
- Studio: IBC (London, England)
- Genre: Rock; soul
- Length: 2:43
- Label: Polydor (UK); Cotillion (US)
- Songwriters: Barry Gibb; Robin Gibb; Maurice Gibb
- Producers: Barry Gibb; Maurice Gibb; Robert Stigwood

The Marbles singles chronology
| "Only One Woman" (1968) | "The Walls Fell Down" (1969) |

"Only One Woman" is a song and the first single by English musical duo the Marbles, written by Barry, Robin and Maurice Gibb of the Bee Gees. It later also appeared on their self-titled album The Marbles.

== Recording and reception ==
It was recorded around July 1968 in IBC Studios, London. The backing track was created by Barry Gibb, Maurice Gibb and Colin Petersen, with an orchestral arrangement by Bill Shepherd. Colin plays the same percussion effect as on "I've Gotta Get a Message to You". The song exists only in a mono mix.

The song was the biggest hit they had in their short-lived career. It entered the UK chart at number 24 and eventually peaked at number five on 2 November 1968. In the Netherlands, it reached number three.

Their performance in a French TV of the song was televised on 192TV.

== Personnel ==
- Graham Bonnet – lead vocal
- Trevor Gordon – backing vocal
- Barry Gibb – guitar
- Maurice Gibb – bass, piano
- Colin Petersen – drums
- Bill Shepherd – orchestral arrangement

== Chart performance ==
=== Weekly charts ===
| Chart (1968–1969) | Peak position |
|---|---|
| Austria (Ö3 Austria Top 40) | 8 |
| Belgium (Ultratop 50 Flanders) | 3 |
| Canada Top Singles (RPM) | 43 |
| France (IFOP) | 18 |
| Ireland (IRMA) | 8 |
| Italy (FIMI) | 46 |
| Netherlands (Dutch Top 40) | 3 |
| Netherlands (Single Top 100) | 3 |
| New Zealand (RIANZ) | 1 |
| Norway (VG-lista) | 6 |
| South Africa (Springbok Radio) | 1 |
| Switzerland (Schweizer Hitparade) | 5 |
| UK Singles (Official Charts) | 5 |
| West Germany (GfK) | 6 |

=== Year-end charts ===
| Chart (1968) | Position |
|---|---|
| Belgium (Ultratop 50 Flanders) | 43 |
| Netherlands (Dutch Top 40) | 8 |

| Chart (1969) | Position |
|---|---|
| South Africa (Springbok Radio) | 19 |

== Notable cover versions ==
- Alien, a Swedish rock band with Jim Jidhed as lead vocalist, reached number one in Sweden with their cover version. The cover appeared on the band's self-titled debut album in 1988.
- The song was covered by Declan Galbraith on his "Thank You" album and by German actor and singer Uwe Ochsenknecht (simply billed as "Ochsenknecht") in 1992.
- Czech singer Lucie Bílá covered the song as "Zpíváš mi Requiem", which became a moderately successful hit in the Czech Republic in that year.
- In 1986, heavy metal band Alcatrazz (which was fronted by ex-Marbles member Graham Bonnet) covered the song for their Dangerous Games album.
- Nigel Olsson, known for playing drums with Elton John, recorded the song on his 1974 self-titled album. It debut on the Billboard Hot 100 2 times in the Spring of 1975, #100 March 1, 1975 to peak at #91 for 3 weeks followed by a return to the chart for one week at #93 April 26, 1975

== See also ==
- List of number-one singles in 1969 (New Zealand)
