= Black Empire (Anthem album) =

Studio album by Anthem
- Released: October 29, 2008
- Recorded: 2006
- Genre: Heavy metal
- Length: 45:44
- Label: JVC Victor
- Producer: Naoto Shibata

Anthem chronology
Immortal (2006)	Black Empire (2008)	Heraldic Device (2011)

Black Empire is the thirteenth studio album by the Japanese heavy metal band Anthem, released on October 29, 2008. It debuted at No. 42 on the Oricon Weekly Albums Chart.

== Track listing ==
1. "Black Empire" - 4:35
2. "Heat of the Night" - 4:06
3. "You" - 3:56
4. "Go Insane" - 4:43
5. "Walk Through the Night" - 4:48
6. "Emptiness World" - 5:13
7. "Telling You" - 4:13
8. "Pilgrim" - 4:23
9. "Awake" - 4:56
10. "Perfect Crawler" - 4:51

== Personnel ==
- Eizo Sakamoto - vocals
- Akio Shimizu - guitars
- Naoto Shibata - bass, producer
- Hirotsugu Homma - drums

== Charts ==
Chart (2008)	Peak position
Japanese Albums (Oricon)	42
