= Underground (Graham Bonnet album) =

Studio album by Graham Bonnet
- Released: 21 August 1997
- Genre: Hard rock, heavy metal
- Length: 40:34
- Label: JVC Victor
- Producer: Pat Regan, Kevin Valentine & Danny Johnson

Graham Bonnet chronology
Here Comes the Night (1991)	Underground (1997)	The Day I Went Mad (1999)

Professional ratings
Review scores
Source	Rating
Allmusic	link

Underground is the fifth solo album by English rock singer Graham Bonnet, originally released in 1997. Underground reunites Bonnet with guitarist Danny Johnson, who previously performed with Bonnet in Alcatrazz. "Lost in Hollywood" is a re-recording of a song Bonnet recorded during his tenure with Rainbow.

== Track listing ==
1. "Underground" (Jo Eime, Danny Johnson, Pat Regan, Kevin Valentine) – 4:13
2. "Whiplash" – 3:35 (Eime, Johnson)
3. "Breakaway" (Eime) – 3:31
4. "Movin' On" (Eime) – 3:30
5. "The Strange" (Eime, Johnson, Regan) – 5:23
6. "Sail On" (Johnson) – 4:51
7. "The Wind Cries Mary" (Jimi Hendrix) – 3:16
8. "Cajun Pink" (Eime, Johnson, Valentine) – 4:23
9. "Winter Skin" (Eime, Johnson) – 4:18
10. "Lost in Hollywood" (Ritchie Blackmore, Roger Glover, Cozy Powell) – 4:54

== Personnel ==
- Graham Bonnet – vocals
- Danny Johnson – guitars
- Kevin Valentine – drums
- Jamie Carter – bass on "Underground", "Whiplash", "Breakaway", "Cajun Pink" and "Lost in Hollywood"
- Tony Franklin – bass on "Movin' On", "The Strange", "Sail On" and "Winter Skin"
- Todd Jensen – bass on "The Wind Cries Mary"
- Pat Regan – keyboards
- Eric Gorfain – violin
