= Joe Stump =

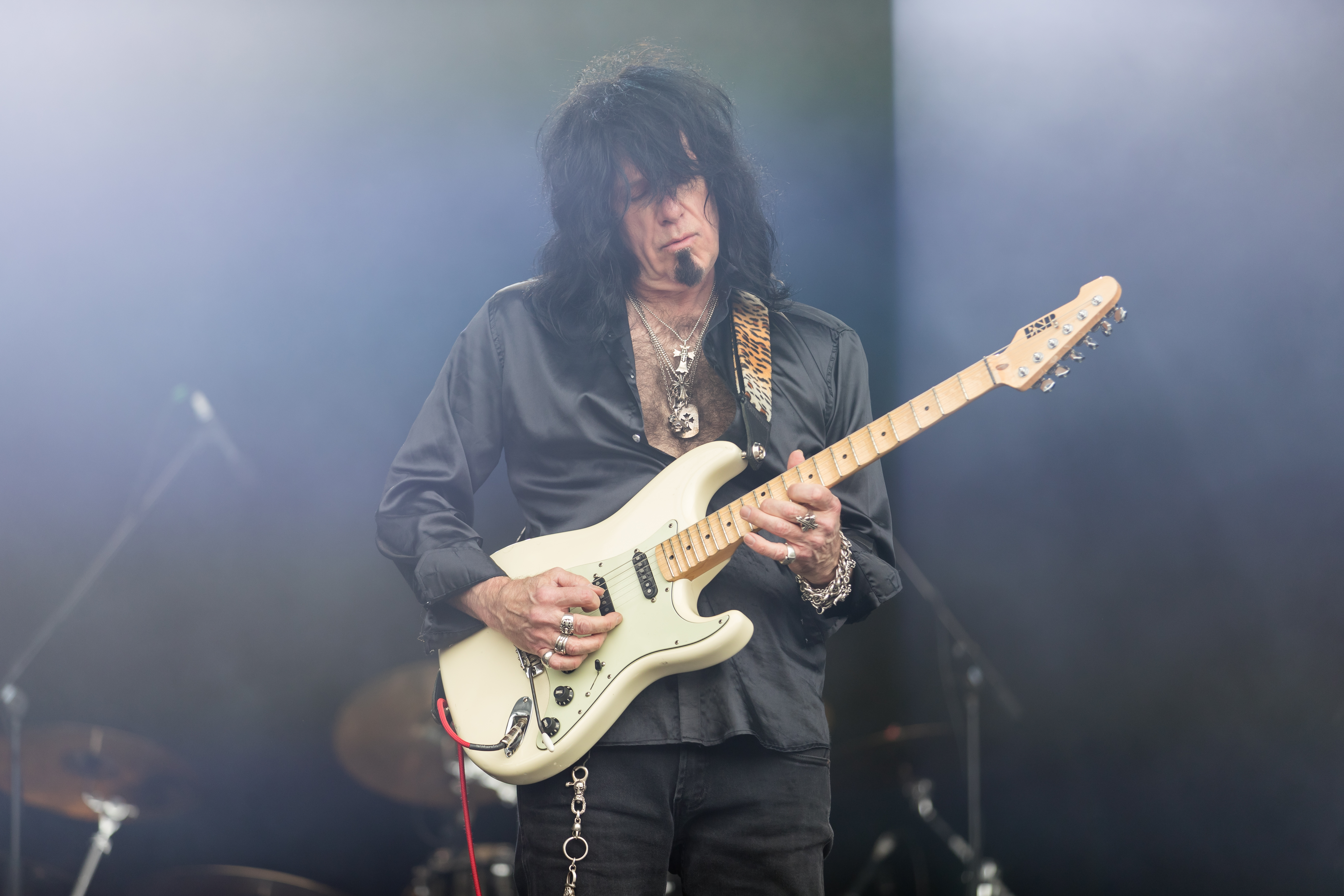
- Stump with Alcatrazz, 2024

Background information
- Genres: Neoclassical metal; speed metal
- Occupations: Musician; songwriter
- Instrument: Guitar
- Years active: 1989–present
- Labels: Leviathan Records; Lion Music
- Member of: Alcatrazz; Tower of Babel
- Formerly of: Trash Broadway; Reign of Terror; HolyHell; Raven Lord; Exorcism
- Website: joeshredlordstump.com

Joe Stump is an American guitarist from Queens, New York. He has played for the bands Exorcism, Raven Lord, HolyHell, Alcatrazz and has an extensive solo career. He is an associate professor at Berklee College of Music. His main musical influences are Ritchie Blackmore, Yngwie Malmsteen, Gary Moore, Michael Schenker, and Uli Jon Roth. Guitar One magazine ranked Stump as the sixth fastest shredder of all time.

== Career ==
He is the bandleader for The Reign of Terror (also known as Joe Stump's Reign of Terror). In 2012, he joined Raven Lord. He didn't play on the debut album since the recording was already finished but played on the album tour in 2013. His new band Joe Stump's Tower of Babel has released two albums: Lake of Fire in 2017 and Days of Thunder in 2025.

== Discography ==
=== Solo ===
- Guitar Dominance! (1993)
- Night of the Living Shred (1994)
- Supersonic Shred Machine (1996)
- Rapid Fire Rondo (1998)
- 2001: A Shred Odyssey (2001)
- Midwest Shredfest (2001)
- Dark Gifts – Rare and Unreleased Tracks (2001)
- Guitar Master (2002)
- Armed and Ready (2003)
- Speed Metal Messiah (2004)
- Virtuostic Vendetta (2009)
- The Essential Shred Guitar Collection (2009, compilation)
- Revenge of the Shredlord (2012)
- The Dark Lord Rises (2015)
- Symphonic Onslaught (2019)
- Diabolical Ferocity (2021)

=== With Trash Broadway ===
- Trash Broadway (1989)

=== With Reign of Terror ===
- Light in the Sky (1996)
- Second Coming (1999)
- Sacred Ground (2001)
- Conquer & Divide (2003)

=== With Shooting Hemlock ===
- Clockwatcher (1997)

=== With HolyHell ===
- Apocalypse (2007, EP) (DE, #91)
- HolyHell (2009)

=== With Exorcism ===
- I Am God (2014)

=== With Raven Lord ===
- Down the Wasteland (2016)

=== With Tower of Babel ===
- Lake of Fire (2017)
- Days of Thunder (2025)

=== With Alcatrazz ===
- Born Innocent (2020)
- V (2021)
- Take No Prisoners (2023)
