= The Day I Went Mad =

Studio album by Graham Bonnet
- Released: 23 June 1999
- Recorded: 1999; Tony King Studios
- Genre: Hard rock, heavy metal
- Length: 49:45
- Label: JVC Victor
- Producer: Kevin Valentine

Graham Bonnet chronology
Underground (1997)	The Day I Went Mad (1999)	–

The Day I Went Mad is the sixth solo album by English rock singer Graham Bonnet, originally released in 1999. Much like his previous solo efforts, Bonnet enlisted a host of guest musicians for the recording, including former Guns N' Roses guitarist Slash, Def Leppard guitarist Vivian Campbell and Vanilla Fudge bassist Tim Bogert. The album cover was illustrated by guitarist Mario Parga, who plays on several tracks.

== Track listing ==
All songs written by Jo Eime, except where indicated.

1. "The Day I Went Mad" – 4:32
2. "Don't Look Down" (Colin Allen, Mick Ronson) – 5:38
3. "Killer" (Eime, Kevin Valentine, Danny Johnson) – 4:34
4. "Oh! Darling" (Lennon–McCartney) – 4:00
5. "Hey That's Me" – 4:32
6. "This Day" – 5:00
7. "Flying Not Falling" – 4:19
8. "Lolita Crush" – 4:53
9. "Model Inc." (Eime, Valentine, Johnson, Pat Regan) – 4:46
10. "Spiked!" ( John Thomas, Jo Eime ) – 2:30
11. "Greenwich Meantime" – 4:55

== Personnel ==
- Graham Bonnet – lead vocals, guitar
- Kevin Valentine – drums
- Mario Parga – guitars on #01, 07, 08 and 11; solo on #01, 07, 08 and 11
- John Thomas – guitars on #01, 03 - 06, 08, 10 and 11; solo on #05, 06 and 10; keyboards on #10
- Danny Johnson – guitars on #03 and 09; solo on #03 and 09
- Vivian Campbell – guitars on #02; solo on #02
- Slash – guitars on #04; solo on #04
- Mark Eric – guitars on #11
- Bruce Kulick – bass on #01, 02, 04 and 05
- Tony Franklin – bass on #03, 06 and 08
- Matt Boyd – bass on #07 and 10
- Jamie Carter – bass on #09
- Tim Bogert – bass on #11
- Michael Alemania – keyboards on #01, 06, 07 and 08
- Teddy Andreass – keyboards on #04
