= Bee Gees Gold =

Compilation album by the Bee Gees
- Released: October 1976
- Recorded: 7 March 1967 – 12 April 1972
- Studio: IBC Studios, London, England, UK
- Genre: Blue-eyed soul, oldies, soft rock, acoustic rock
- Length: 38:31
- Label: RSO
- Producer: Barry Gibb, Robin Gibb, Maurice Gibb, Robert Stigwood, Ossie Byrne

The Bee Gees chronology
Children of the World (1976)	Bee Gees Gold (1976)	Here at Last... Bee Gees... Live (1977)

Professional ratings
Review scores
Source	Rating
AllMusic	4.5/5 stars
The Rolling Stone Album Guide	3.5/5 stars

Bee Gees Gold is a compilation album, released in limited territories, that focused on the early hits of the Bee Gees. Labeled as "Volume 1", it featured their U.S. Top 20 hits between 1967 and 1972 (plus "I Can't See Nobody", an album cut from Bee Gees 1st). The album was intended to replace the two previous hits compilations, Best of Bee Gees and Best of Bee Gees, Volume 2. It reached number 50 on Billboard's album chart during a time when the Bee Gees were topping the charts with their new R&B/disco sound found on their then current album Children of the World. Gold went gold in America in January 1978 and has sold 1.3 million copies to date. A kind of second volume was released as Bee Gees Greatest in 1979 which summed up the disco years from 1975 to 1979.

The album was never released on CD, though the previous two compilations mentioned above were issued in the late 1980s. Cassette versions were available well into the 1990s.

== Reception ==
Cashbox said "The Bee Gees are one of the few groups who can put out an album of songs that have all gone gold and call it Volume One. All of these tunes were big hits, and one is staggered by the sheer numbers. Apparently this is going to be a chronological collection, as early hits like 'My World' and 'I Started a Joke' are included. A marvelous reference work for all pop programmers, this will be swept in with the sales boom on all other Bee Gees product."

== Track listing ==
All songs are written by Barry Gibb, Robin Gibb and Maurice Gibb, except for those with asterisks, which are by Barry and Robin Gibb.

Side one

1. "How Can You Mend a Broken Heart"* - 3:57
2. "Holiday"* - 2:52
3. "To Love Somebody"* - 2:58
4. "Massachusetts - 2:22
5. "Words - 3:13
6. "Lonely Days - 3:46

Side two

1. "Run to Me" - 3:10
2. "I've Gotta Get a Message to You" - 2:59
3. "My World"* - 4:18
4. "I Can't See Nobody"* - 3:43
5. "I Started a Joke" - 3:04
6. "New York Mining Disaster 1941"* - 2:09

== Certifications and sales ==
Certifications for Bee Gees Gold
Region	Certification	Certified units/sales
Canada (Music Canada)	Gold	50,000^{^}
United States (RIAA)	Gold	500,000^{^}
^{^} Shipments figures based on certification alone.
