= Live' Melt Down =

Live album by Anthem
- Released: May 21, 2003
- Recorded: Osaka, January 16, 2003; Tokyo, January 18, 2003
- Genre: Heavy metal
- Length: 68:22
- Label: JVC Victor
- Producer: Naoto Shibata

Anthem chronology
| Overload (2002) | Live' Melt Down (2003) | Eternal Warrior (2004) |

Live' Melt Down is the third live album released by the Japanese heavy metal band Anthem and recorded during their "Overload Live" tour of 2003.

== Track listing ==
1. "Demon's Ride" - 5:06
2. "Overload" - 4:34
3. "Machine Made Dog" - 6:00
4. "Venom Strike" - 5:11
5. "Tears for the Lovers" - 7:27
6. "Silent Child" - 4:29
7. "Cryin' Heart" - 5:05
8. "Gotta Go" - 5:03
9. "Grieve of Heart" - 4:24
10. "Running Blood" - 5:59
11. "Revenge" - 4:54
12. "Wild Anthem" - 5:40
13. "Steeler" - 4:35

== Personnel ==
=== Band members ===
- Eizo Sakamoto - vocals
- Akio Shimizu - guitars
- Naoto Shibata - bass, producer
- Hirotsugu Homma - drums
