= Immortal (Anthem album) =

Studio album by Anthem
- Released: August 30, 2006
- Recorded: 2006
- Genre: Heavy metal
- Length: 47:42
- Label: JVC Victor
- Producer: Naoto Shibata

Anthem chronology
Eternal Warrior (2004)	Immortal (2006)	Black Empire (2008)

Immortal is the twelfth studio album by the Japanese heavy metal band Anthem, released on August 30, 2006. In Europe, the album was sold together with the Anthem 20th Anniversary Tour 2005 bonus DVD; this DVD included several videos of the band rehearsing some of the songs that were included in the album: "Immortal Bind", "Insomnia", "Mob Groove", and "Road to Nowhere". This bonus DVD is known as "Core". It debuted at No. 41 on the Oricon Weekly Albums Chart.

== Track listing ==
1. "Immortal Bind" (Shibata) - 4:32
2. "Soul Motor" (Shibata) - 3:34
3. "Mob Groove" (Shibata) - 4:26
4. "Ignite" (Shibata) - 3:59
5. "The Beginning" (Shibata) - 4:05
6. "Freak Out!" (Shibata) - 4:50
7. "Insomnia" (Shimizu) - 4:13
8. "Unknown World" (Shibata) - 4:41
9. "Betrayer" (Shibata) - 3:58
10. "Echoes in the Dark" (Sakamoto, Shimizu) - 5:15
11. "Road to Nowhere" (Shibata) - 4:05

== Personnel ==
- Eizo Sakamoto - vocals
- Akio Shimizu - guitars
- Naoto Shibata - bass, producer
- Hirotsugu Homma - drums

== Charts ==
Chart (2006)	Peak position
Japanese Albums (Oricon)	41
