= Dangerous Games (album) =

Studio album by Alcatrazz
- Released: August 21, 1986
- Studio: American Recording Co., Calabasas, California
- Genre: Hard rock, heavy metal
- Length: 38:04
- Label: Capitol
- Producer: Richie Podolor

Alcatrazz chronology
Disturbing the Peace (1985)	Dangerous Games (1986)	The Best of Alcatrazz (1996)

Professional ratings
Review scores
Source	Rating
AllMusic	2/5 stars
The Collector's Guide to Heavy Metal	8/10
Kerrang!	3.5/5 stars

Dangerous Games is the third studio album by American heavy metal band Alcatrazz. It marked a drastic departure from the band's two previous albums with its heavily Japanese-influenced style. It was also the first and only appearance for new guitarist Danny Johnson who replaced Steve Vai after he left the band to join The David Lee Roth Band in 1986, and the last studio album that Alcatrazz had released for 34 years, until the release of Born Innocent in 2020.

== Track listing ==
(Songwriters listed in parentheses.)

Side one

1. "It's My Life" (Carl D'Erico, Roger Atkins) – 4:10
2. "Undercover" (Danny Johnson, Jimmy Waldo, Jo Eime, Graham Bonnet) – 3:41
3. "That Ain't Nothin'" (Johnson, Waldo, Eime, Bonnet, Gary Shea, Jan Uvena) – 3:53
4. "No Imagination" (Eime, Bonnet) – 3:16
5. "Ohayo Tokyo" (Eime, Bonnet) – 2:59

Side two

6. "Dangerous Games" (Johnson) – 3:26
7. "Blue Boar" (Johnson, Waldo, Eime, Bonnet) – 3:14
8. "Only One Woman" (Barry Gibb, Maurice Gibb, Robin Gibb) – 3:43 (The Marbles cover)
9. "The Witchwood" (Johnson, Waldo, Eime, Bonnet) – 4:00
10. "Double Man" (Johnson, Waldo, Eime, Bonnet, Shea, Uvena) – 4:30
11. "Night of the Shooting Star" (Eime, Bonnet) – 1:04

== Personnel ==
Band members

- Graham Bonnet – vocals, backing vocals
- Danny Johnson – guitar, backing vocals
- Jimmy Waldo – keyboards, backing vocals
- Gary Shea – bass
- Jan Uvena – drums, backing vocals

Additional musicians

- Jay Davis – backing vocals
- Jimmy Haslip – bass

Production

- Richard Podolor – producer
- Bill Cooper – engineer
- Mike Reese – mastering
- Jo Eime – lyricist
- Roy Kohara – art direction
- Wendy Dio, Niji Management Inc. – management
