= Seven Hills (album) =

Studio album by Anthem
- Released: August 22, 2001
- Recorded: 2001
- Genre: Heavy metal
- Length: 47:19
- Label: JVC Victor
- Producer: Naoto Shibata

Anthem chronology
| Heavy Metal Anthem (2000) | Seven Hills (2001) | Overload (2002) |

Seven Hills is the ninth studio album by the Japanese heavy metal band Anthem, released on August 22, 2001. It's the second studio album since their reformation in 2000 and the first with totally original material. It's also their first album with vocalist Eizo Sakamoto first 1987's Bound to Break. It debuted at No. 35 on the Oricon Weekly Albums Chart.

== Track listing ==
1. "Grieve of Heart" (Shibata) - 4:13
2. "Raging Twister" (Sakamoto, Shibata) - 4:17
3. "XTC" (Shibata) - 4:35
4. "The Man with No Name" (Shibata) - 4:46
5. "March to the Madness" (Sakamoto, Shibata) - 5:08
6. "D.I.M. 422" (Shimizu) - 3:21
7. "Running Blood" (Sakamoto, Shibata) - 5:39
8. "Freedom" (Shibata) - 4:38
9. "Silently and Perfectly" (Shibata) - 5:58
10. "The Innocent Man" (Shibata) - 4:44

== Personnel ==
Anthem

- Eizo Sakamoto - vocals
- Akio Shimizu - guitars
- Naoto Shibata - bass, producer
- Hirotsugu Homma - drums

Production

- Dan McClendon - engineer, mixing
- Andy Martin - assistant engineer
- George Azuma - supervisor

== Charts ==
| Chart (2001) | Peak position |
|---|---|
| Japanese Albums (Oricon) | 35 |
