= Born Innocent (Alcatrazz album) =

Studio album by Alcatrazz
- Released: July 31, 2020
- Genres: Hard rock, heavy metal
- Length: 57:58
- Label: Silver Lining Music
- Producers: Giles Lavery; Jimmy Waldo

Alcatrazz chronology
Parole Denied – Tokyo 2017 (2018)	Born Innocent (2020)	V (2021)

Singles from Alcatrazz
- 1. "Polar Bear" Released: 2020; 2. "London 1666" Released: 2020; 3. "Dirty Like the City" Released: 2020

Born Innocent is the fourth studio album by American heavy metal band Alcatrazz, released in 2020 by the label Silver Lining Music. This is the band's first studio album release since Dangerous Games in 1986, marking the longest gap between two studio albums in the Alcatrazz discography. Several months after the album's release, it was announced that Graham Bonnet and the other members of the band would be parting ways, with both continuing to record as Alcatrazz separately.

== Background ==
Born Innocent features performances by founding band members Graham Bonnet on lead vocals, Jimmy Waldo on keyboards, and Gary Shea on bass guitar. It also features the first Alcatrazz studio album appearances of drummer Mark Benquechea, who had previously appeared on the 2018 album Meanwhile, Back in the Garage by the Graham Bonnet Band, and guitarist Joe Stump, a Berklee Professor of Guitar. To celebrate the reunion of three of the original members of the band, a number of other musicians were asked to make guest appearances on the album, namely:

Chris Impellitteri, who wrote and performed guitar on the track "Born Innocent"

Bob Kulick, who wrote and performed on the track "I Am the King"

Former Alcatrazz guitarist Steve Vai, who wrote the track "Dirty Like the City"

Jeff Waters, who performed on the song "Paper Flags"

Nozomu Wakai, who performed on "Finn McCool".

Bob Kulick died in May 2020, two months prior to the album's release.

The band released music videos for the three singles, "Polar Bear", "London 1666", and "Dirty Like the City".

== Reception ==
Professional ratings
Review scores
Source	Rating
Blabbermouth	8/10
Classic Rock	4/5 stars

Born Innocent received positive reviews upon its release, with reviewers complimenting the performance of the then-72-year-old Graham Bonnet. The album was said to be "on par" with the band's older work, an achievement in view of the almost three and a half decade interval between releases. The sound of the 2020 incarnation of Alcatrazz was noted as being in keeping with the rock and heavy metal of the 1980s but with a fresh feeling and natural sound, lacking any hint of contrivance. One review noted that the album was a "well rounded effort".

== Track listing ==
All lyrics are written by Graham Bonnet (except noted below).

CD
No.	Title	Lyrics	Music	Length
1.	"Born Innocent"		Chris Impelliteri	3:05
2.	"Polar Bear"		Graham Bonnet	4:34
3.	"Finn McCool"		Nozomu Wakai	4:31
4.	"We Still Remember"		Dario Mollo, D. Kendall Jones	4:02
5.	"London 1666"	Giles Lavery	Joe Stump	4:59
6.	"Dirty Like the City"		Steve Vai	3:48
7.	"I Am the King"		Bob Kulick	5:29
8.	"Something That I Am Missing"		Mollo	4:35
9.	"Paper Flags"		Jimmy Waldo	3:59
10.	"The Wound Is Open"		Kulick	3:47
11.	"Body Beautiful"		Stump	4:59
12.	"Warth Lane"		Mollo	6:15
13.	"For Tony"		Bonnet	3:59

== Personnel ==
Alcatrazz

- Graham Bonnet – vocals
- Jimmy Waldo – keyboards
- Mark Benquechea – drums
- Gary Shea – bass (tracks 4, 6–8, 10–13)
- Joe Stump – all guitars (tracks 2, 5, 6, 9, 11, 13), lead guitar (tracks 7, 10), rhythm guitar (track 7)

Additional personnel

- Chris Impellittieri — all guitars (track 1)
- Nozomu Wakai — all guitars (track 3)
- D Kendall Jones — all guitars (track 4)
- Bob Kulick — rhythm guitar (tracks 7, 10)
- Dario Mollo — all guitars (tracks 8, 12)
- Don Van Stavern — bass (tracks 1–3, 5, 9)
- Jeff Waters — second guitar solo (track 9)
- Steve Mann — brass (track 13)
- JoAnn Waldo — vocals (track 6)

== Charts ==
Chart (2020)	Peak position
Swiss Albums (Schweizer Hitparade)	36
