= Mario Parga =

English guitarist

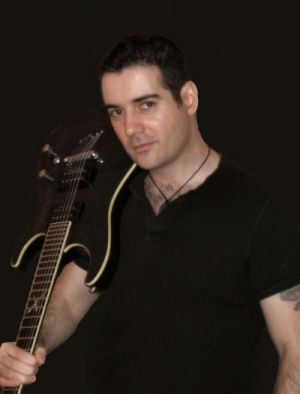
Image of Mario Parga

Mario Parga (born 7 August 1969) is an English guitarist. He came into the spotlight during the late 1980s when he began appearing in numerous guitar and rock magazines such as Guitar Player, Metal Hammer, Kerrang, Metal Forces and played a live guitar solo on MTV's 'Metal Hammer' show.

Parga was born in Lytham, Lancashire.

During the early 1990s Parga toured, played and recorded with numerous artists, most notably Cozy Powell and Graham Bonnet. In 1991, his debut guitar instrumental album The Magician was released by President Records. Following disillusionment with the music industry, Parga shied away from the scene until he re-emerged in Los Angeles in 1998, playing guitar on Graham Bonnet's The Day I Went Mad.

Considered by many to be one of the greatest sweep arpeggio players of the guitar 'shred' and neoclassical metal genres, Parga combines complex arpeggio patterns with rapid alternate picking, Sweep-picking and string bending. Mario was listed in the July '08 edition of the international magazine Guitar World as being one of the World's 50 fastest guitarists (alternate picking technique) based on a scientific note clocking experiment. Despite his amazing speed, he is also renowned for his highly emotive slower playing.

In 2000, Parga was approached by the guitar label Liquid Note Records and recorded his instrumental 'Valse Diabolique' for their The Alchemists album. Two years later, he recorded his haunting ballad 'Hourglass' for Lion Music's Warmth in the Wilderness II, a tribute to fellow guitarist Jason Becker.

Early in 2007, Parga announced the creation of his own record label 'MidnightCafe Music', (the name taken from his track 'The Midnight Café' from The Magician) and plans on releasing his future instrumental rock guitar music through it. His long-awaited album Entranced was released on the label on 14 April 2007.

Mario Parga lives in Las Vegas, Nevada, United States with his wife Shawna and their daughter Skye.
