= Disturbing the Peace (album) =

Studio album by Alcatrazz
- Released: February 26, 1985
- Recorded: 1984
- Studio: Cherokee (Hollywood); Skyline (Topanga)
- Genre: Hard rock, heavy metal
- Length: 41:21
- Label: Capitol
- Producer: Eddie Kramer

Alcatrazz chronology
| Live Sentence (1984) | Disturbing the Peace (1985) | Dangerous Games (1986) |

Singles from Disturbing the Peace
- 1. "God Blessed Video" / "Wire and Wood" Released: 1985 (UK only)

Professional ratings
Review scores
| Source | Rating |
|---|---|
| AllMusic | 1.5/5 stars |
| The Collector's Guide to Heavy Metal | 9/10 |

Disturbing the Peace is the second studio album by the American heavy metal band Alcatrazz, released in 1985. It is the band's only album to feature guitarist Steve Vai. The album remained for 7 weeks on the Billboard 200 albums chart, peaking at No. 145.

The album was re-released in 2001 as Vol.02 of Steve Vai's The Secret Jewel Box and as a remastered, expanded version with a different cover in 2013 on Polish label Metal Mind.

== Track listing ==
All songs by Graham Bonnet and Steve Vai, except where noted.

Side one

1. "God Blessed Video" – 3:30
2. "Mercy" (Bonnet, Vai, Jimmy Waldo, Gary Shea, Jan Uvena) – 4:22
3. "Will You Be Home Tonight" (Bonnet, Vai, Waldo) – 5:03
4. "Wire and Wood" – 3:29
5. "Desert Diamond" – 4:20

Side two

6. "Stripper" – 3:52
7. "Painted Lover" – 3:23
8. "Lighter Shade of Green" [instrumental] (Vai) – 0:46
9. "Sons and Lovers" – 3:37
10. "Skyfire" – 3:54
11. "Breaking the Heart of the City" – 4:59

2011 Expanded Edition Disc 2, previously unreleased live album

Recorded October 10, 1984, at Shinjuku Koseinenkin Kaikan, Tokyo, Japan

1. "Opening" – 2:08
2. "Breaking the Heart of the City" – 6:18
3. "Jet to Jet" – 4:38
4. "Skyfire" – 3:54
5. "Sons and Lovers" – 3:03
6. "Hiroshima Mon Amour" – 3:52
7. "God Blessed Video" – 4:58
8. "Will You Be Home Tonight" – 5:07
9. "Kree Nakoorie" – 9:09
10. "Since You've Been Gone" – 3:20
11. "Painted Lover" – 3:40
12. "Suffer Me" – 6:08
13. "Stripper" – 3:56
14. "Too Young to Die, Too Drunk to Live" – 4:46
15. "Koujou No Tsuki (The Moon over the Lake)" – 2:01
16. "Night Games" – 3:04
17. "All Night Long" – 8:55

== Personnel ==
=== Alcatrazz ===
- Graham Bonnet – vocals, backing vocals
- Steve Vai – guitar, backing vocals
- Jimmy Waldo – keyboards, backing vocals, keytar on "God Blessed Video" (live)
- Gary Shea – bass
- Jan Uvena – drums, backing vocals

=== Production ===
- Eddie Kramer – producer, engineer, mixing at Cherokee Studios
- John Begoshian Paul Levy – engineers, mixing
- Brian Leshon, Brian Scheuble, Mark Wilczak, Paul Lani, Ross Stien – assistant engineers
- George Marino – mastering at Sterling Sound, New York
- Ron Slenzak – photography
- Andrew Trueman – management
