= Live Sentence =

Live album by Alcatrazz
- Released: May 1984
- Recorded: January 28, 1984
- Venues: Nakano Sun Plaza, Tokyo, Japan
- Genres: Heavy metal, hard rock
- Length: 38:52
- Labels: Rocshire (US), Polydor (Japan)
- Producers: Andrew Trueman, Lester Claypool

Alcatrazz chronology
No Parole from Rock 'n' Roll (1983)	Live Sentence (1984)	Disturbing the Peace (1985)

Professional ratings
Review scores
Source	Rating
AllMusic	2.5/5 stars
The Collector's Guide to Heavy Metal	6/10

Live Sentence is a 1984 live album by American heavy metal band Alcatrazz, and the only live album featuring the band's original lineup. The live concert recorded for the album was performed on January 28, 1984, at Nakano Sun Plaza in Tokyo. In addition to tracks from Alcatrazz's debut album, No Parole from Rock 'n" Roll, the album includes performances by Alcatrazz of songs from the Rainbow album Down to Earth recorded and released when Graham Bonnet, Alcatrazz's singer and primary lyricist, was the lead singer of Rainbow. According to Billboard, the album spent 16 weeks on the chart and peaked at No. 133.

== Track listings ==
Side A
No.	Title	Writer(s)	Length
1.	"Too Young to Die, Too Drunk to Live"	Graham Bonnet, Yngwie Malmsteen	4:48
2.	"Hiroshima Mon Amour"	Bonnet, Malmsteen	4:13
3.	"Night Games" (from Graham Bonnet's solo album Line-Up)	Ed Hamilton	3:28
4.	"Island in the Sun"	Bonnet, Malmsteen, Jimmy Waldo	4:09

Side B
No.	Title	Writer(s)	Length
5.	"Kree Nakoorie"	Bonnet, Malmsteen, Waldo	6:52
6.	"Coming Bach" (instrumental)	Johann Sebastian Bach	0:52
7.	"Since You've Been Gone" (Rainbow cover)	Russ Ballard	3:32
8.	"Evil Eye" (instrumental)	Malmsteen	5:13
9.	"All Night Long" (Rainbow cover)	Ritchie Blackmore, Roger Glover	5:45

2011 Reissue bonus tracks
No.	Title	Writer(s)	Length
10.	"Big Foot"	Bonnet, Malmsteen	4:12
11.	"Suffer Me"	Bonnet, Malmsteen	4:52
12.	"Desert Song" (Michael Schenker Group cover)	Michael Schenker, Bonnet	5:10
13.	"Guitar Crash" (instrumental)	Malmsteen	4:00
14.	"Lost in Hollywood" (Rainbow cover)	Blackmore, Glover, Cozy Powell	5:25
15.	"Koujou No Tsuki"	Bonnet, Malmsteen	1:37
16.	"Something Else" (Eddie Cochran cover)	Bob Cochran, Sharon Sheeley	3:38
Total length:			67:46

- "Coming Bach" is Malmsteen's arrangement for solo guitar of Johann Sebastian Bach's Bourrée in E minor.
- The song "Kree Nakoorie" was edited down to 6:52 for the album release, the song actually ran 11:13 long at the show. On the album the song ends when the crowd cheers, but at the concert there was an additional 4:21 guitar solo ending with Yngwie J. Malmsteen making his guitar sound like a spaceship taking off. This extended version of the song can be found on any video release.
- The bonus tracks are from the same concert and comprise the entire unabridged concert with the exception of Jet To Jet.

=== No Parole from Rock 'n' Roll Tour Live in Japan 1984.1.28 Audio Tracks (2010 Reissue) ===
1. "Too Young to Die, Too Drunk to Live"
2. "Hiroshima Mon Amour"
3. "Night Games"
4. "Big Foot"
5. "Island in the Sun"
6. "Kree Nakoorie"
7. "Since You've Been Gone"
8. "Suffer Me"
9. "Desert Song"
10. "Evil Eye"
11. "All Night Long"
12. "Lost in Hollywood"
13. "Koujou No Tsuki"
14. "Something Else"

=== 2016 Remastered Version ===
CD

1. "Too Young to Die, Too Drunk to Live" – 4:52
2. "Hiroshima Mon Amour" – 4:12
3. "Night Games" – 3:01
4. "Big Foot" – 4:12
5. "Island in the Sun" – 4:09
6. "Kree Nakoorie" – 7:35
7. "Coming Bach" – 3:20
8. "Since You've Been Gone" – 3:32
9. "Suffer Me" – 4:52
10. "Desert Song" – 5:14
11. "Evil Eye" – 5:05
12. "Guitar Crash" – 4:37
13. "All Night Long" – 7:08
14. "Lost in Hollywood" – 5:25
15. "Koujou No Tsuki" – 1:37
16. "Something Else" – 3:10

DVD

Live at Nakano Sunplaza, Tokyo, January 28, 1984

1. "Too Young to Die, Too Drunk to Live"
2. "Hiroshima Mon Amour"
3. "Night Games"
4. "Big Foot"
5. "Island in the Sun"
6. "Kree Nakoorie"
7. "Coming Bach"
8. "Since You Been Gone"
9. "Suffer Me"
10. "Desert Song"
11. "Evil Eye"
12. "Guitar Crash"
13. "All Night Long"
14. "Lost in Hollywood"
15. "Koujou No Tsuki"
16. "Something Else"

Rock Palace USA

1. "Too Young to Die, Too Drunk to Live"
2. "Hiroshima Mon Amour"
3. "Island in the Sun"

=== CD 1 ===
1. Opening ("Incubus")
2. Too Young To Die, Too Drunk To Live
3. Hiroshima Mon Amour
4. Night Games
5. Big Foot
6. Island In The Sun
7. Kree Nakoorie
8. Coming Bach
9. Since You Been Gone
10. Suffer Me

=== CD2 ===
1. Desert Song
2. Jet To Jet
3. Evil Eye
4. Guitar Crush
5. All Night Long
6. Lost In Hollywood
7. Kojo No Tsuki
8. Something Else

==== DVD / BD ====
1. Opening
2. Too Young To Die, Too Drunk To Live
3. Hiroshima Mon Amour
4. Night Games
5. Big Foot
6. Island In The Sun
7. Kree Nakoorie
8. Coming Bach
9. Since You Been Gone
10. Suffer Me
11. Desert Song
12. Jet To Jet
13. Evil Eye
14. Guitar Crush
15. All Night Long
16. Lost In Hollywood
17. Kojo No Tsuki
18. Something Else

== Personnel ==
Alcatrazz

- Graham Bonnet – vocals, acoustic guitar on "Something Else"
- Yngwie Malmsteen – guitar
- Jimmy Waldo – keyboards, backing vocals, guitar on "Something Else"
- Gary Shea – bass
- Jan Uvena – drums, backing vocals

Production

- Andrew Trueman – producer
- Lester Claypool – producer, remixing at Rochshire Studios, Anaheim, California
- Jeffrey Karlson, Kanae Yokota – live recording engineers
- Jimmy Isaacs – guitar technician
- Linda Henman – remixing assistant
- Peter Vargo – remixing assistant
- Bad Samuels – art direction
- Jake Duncan – tour manager
- Andrew Trueman for De Novo Music Group – management
