= Overload (Anthem album) =

Studio album by Anthem
- Released: October 9, 2002
- Recorded: 2002
- Genre: Heavy metal
- Length: 42:27
- Label: JVC Victor
- Producer: Naoto Shibata

Anthem chronology
Seven Hills (2001)	Overload (2002)	Live' Melt Down (2003)

Overload is tenth studio album by the Japanese heavy metal band Anthem, released on October 9, 2002. The album has been considered by critics to be more aggressive than their previous album, Seven Hills. This direction of blending both new and old styles into their own musical style became the force for their future releases. It debuted at No. 40 on the Oricon Weekly Albums Chart.

== Track listing ==
1. "Revenge" (Shibata) - 4:21
2. "The Voices" (Shibata) - 3:47
3. "Demon's Ride" (Shibata) - 4:26
4. "Rough and Wild" (Shibata) - 4:07
5. "Rescue You" (Sakamoto, Shibata) - 4:06
6. "Ground Zero" (Shimizu) - 3:21
7. "Overload" (Sakamoto, Shibata) - 4:28
8. "Desert of the Sea (Sakamoto, Shibata) - 5:14
9. "Gotta Go" (Sakamoto, Shibata) - 4:12
10. "Eternal Mind" (Shimizu) - 4:18

== Personnel ==
Anthem

- Eizo Sakamoto - vocals
- Akio Shimizu - guitars
- Naoto Shibata - bass, producer
- Hirotsugu Homma - drums

Production

- Chris Tsangarides - mixing
- George Azuma - supervisor

== Charts ==
Chart (2002)	Peak position
Japanese Albums (Oricon)	40
