= Heavy Metal Anthem =

Studio album by Anthem
- Released: April 21, 2000
- Recorded: 2000
- Genre: Heavy metal
- Length: 51:02
- Language: English
- Label: JVC Victor
- Producers: Yorimasa Hisatake, Naoto Shibata, Chris Tsangarides

Anthem chronology
Domestic Booty (1992)	Heavy Metal Anthem (2000)	Seven Hills (2001)

Heavy Metal Anthem is the eighth studio album by the Japanese heavy metal band Anthem, released on April 21, 2000. It was their first album since their disbandment in 1992. Most of the former members play on the album, but with the English singer Graham Bonnet on vocals; the original vocalist, Eizo Sakamoto, returned on the next album, Seven Hills. All of the songs are from Anthem's older releases, rerecorded and sung in English by Bonnet. Bassist and principal songwriter Naoto Shibata recreated the songs with Bonnet's voice in mind, including the English lyrics.

== Track listing ==
1. "Gypsy Ways (Win, Lose or Draw)" (Boyd, Shibata) - 5:47
2. "Evil Touch" (Boyd, Shibata) - 4:47
3. "Show Must Go On!" (Sakamoto, Shibata, Tsangarides) - 3:52
4. "Midnight Sun" (Boyd, Shibata, Tsangarides) - 4:44
5. "The Juggler" (Boyd, Shibata) - 3:49
6. "Mr. Genius" (Boyd, Shibata) - 4:32
7. "Cryin' Heart" (Boyd, Shibata) - 4:47
8. "Hunting Time" (Boyd, Shibata) - 6:02
9. "Hungry Soul" (Boyd, Shibata) - 5:23
10. "Blinded Pain" (Boyd, Shibata) - 7:15

== Personnel ==
Anthem

- Graham Bonnet - vocals
- Naoto Shibata - bass, producer
- Takamasa "mad" Ohuchi - drums
- Akio Shimizu - guitars

Additional musicians

- Kazumasa Saito - guitar on "Gypsy Ways"
- Hirotsugu Homma - drums on "Hungry Soul"
- Yoshitaka Mikuni - keyboards

Production

- Yorimasa Hisatake - producer
- Chris Tsangarides - producer, mixing
- Masahiro Fukuhara - engineer
- Yasuo Higashidate - engineer
- Katsuyuki Kobayashi - assistant engineer
- Nobuyoshi Tanaka - assistant engineer
- Tim Luce - vocal engineer
- Kevin Valentine - vocal engineer
- George Azuma - supervisor
