= Graham Bonnet =

English singer

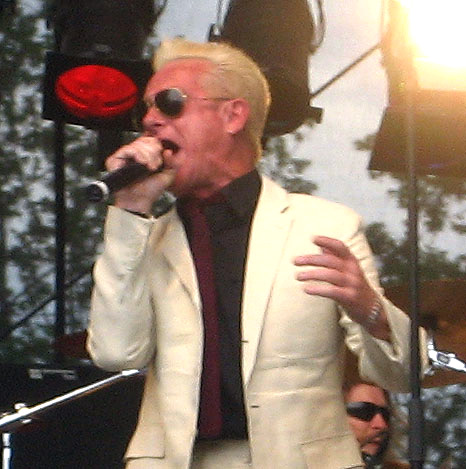
- Bonnet at the 2008 Sauna Open Air Metal Festival

Background information
- Born: 23 December 1947 (age 78); Skegness, Lincolnshire, England
- Genres: Hard rock; heavy metal; AOR
- Occupations: Singer, songwriter
- Years active: 1967–present
- Formerly of: The Marbles, Rainbow, Michael Schenker Group, Alcatrazz, Impellitteri, Blackthorne, Anthem
- Website: www.facebook.com/grahambonnetmusic

Graham Bonnet (born 23 December 1947) is an English rock singer. He has recorded and performed as a solo artist and as a member of several hard rock and heavy metal bands including Rainbow, Michael Schenker Group, Alcatrazz, and Impellitteri. He is known for his powerful singing voice but is capable of also singing soft melodies. His singing has been noted as "very loud" by both his contemporaries and himself, and he claims to be a self-taught singer with "no discipline for lessons". Bonnet's visual style is considered uncharacteristic of hard rock musicians, with neatly cropped hair and wearing tailored blazers and dress shirts, and has been described as being a cross between Don Johnson in Miami Vice and James Dean.

== Career ==
Bonnet was born in Skegness, Lincolnshire, in 1947. He had his first hit single with duo the Marbles in 1968, with the single "Only One Woman", which reached Number 5 in the UK Singles Chart. This and its follow-up, "The Walls Fell Down", were both written by Barry Gibb, Robin Gibb and Maurice Gibb of the Bee Gees who had recorded in Australia with Bonnet's bandmate from the Marbles, Trevor Gordon.

Bonnet then quit to do advert jingles. He appeared in the 1974 British comedy film, Three for All as lead singer of Billy Beethoven, a fictional band, along with several notable UK comedy personalities and his then wife Adrienne Posta, although his character's lines were limited to only two words.

In 1977, he released an eponymous album, which was certified gold in Australia. The single, "It's All Over Now, Baby Blue", a cover version of the Bob Dylan song, also reached number three in Australia in November 1977, and the following year the single "Warm Ride", written by the Bee Gees, a leftover from the Saturday Night Fever sessions, reached number two there in August.

== Rainbow ==
In 1979, Bonnet was approached to join UK glam rock band Sweet to replace Brian Connolly. However, he was chosen by Ritchie Blackmore to replace Ronnie James Dio as the vocalist of hard rock band Rainbow. This was something of a musical departure for Bonnet, who had previously identified himself more as an R&B singer. Bonnet would later credit his time in Rainbow and his collaboration with Blackmore, in particular, as fundamentally changing his musical outlook to a more hard rock focus. He sang on the Down to Earth LP, which would become his most successful album. It spawned two hit singles in 1979 and 1980: "Since You Been Gone" and "All Night Long". During Bonnet's time in the band, Rainbow also headlined the inaugural Monsters of Rock festival at Donington Park, Castle Donington.

Bonnet's time with Rainbow was short and he left to resume his solo career, releasing the Line-Up album in 1981, handled by producer John Eden. Following on from his time in Rainbow, the album had a markedly more rock-based sound than his previous solo recordings, whilst retaining some of his former R&B influences. For the recording of Line Up Bonnet enlisted several well-known rock musicians including Whitesnake guitarist Mick Moody, Whitesnake and Rainbow drummer Cozy Powell, Deep Purple and Whitesnake keyboard player Jon Lord, and Status Quo guitarists Francis Rossi and Rick Parfitt. The album reached No. 62 in the UK Albums Chart. The album's lead single, "Night Games", reached No. 6 in the UK Singles Chart, with the follow-up single, "Liar", reaching No. 51. Around this time Bonnet sang on an advertisement for Levi's jeans (the song was entitled "These Eyes"), although his version has never been released.

== Michael Schenker Group ==
Tempted by an offer from ex-UFO guitarist Michael Schenker, Bonnet continued his progression to a heavier musical style and joined the Michael Schenker Group for the Assault Attack album. It was reported in the press at the time that Ritchie Blackmore had warned Michael Schenker that Bonnet was diabetic, and could become erratic when his blood sugar level got out of kilter. Bonnet was fired from the group after only a single concert, at Sheffield Polytechnic (now called Sheffield Hallam University), when he drunkenly exposed himself on stage.

== Alcatrazz ==
Upon leaving the Michael Schenker Group, Bonnet decided to form his own band, drawing inspiration from his days in Rainbow. In 1983, he co-founded Alcatrazz, with Gary Shea (bass), and Jimmy Waldo (keyboards) of the band New England, former Alice Cooper drummer Jan Uvena, and Swedish guitarist Yngwie Malmsteen. The band's debut album, No Parole from Rock N' Roll, featured a distinctly heavy metal sound, with Bonnet describing the material as the heaviest that he had recorded to date. The band enjoyed moderate success in the United States, and major success in Japan.

The band released three studio albums (No Parole from Rock N' Roll, Disturbing the Peace, with guitarist Steve Vai replacing Malmsteen, and Dangerous Games with Danny Johnson on guitar). Alcatrazz also released a live album, Live Sentence, with material from Yngwie Malmsteen's period in the band. For the Dangerous Games LP, Alcatrazz recorded a remake of Bonnet's hit song "Only One Woman" from his first band The Marbles. In 1987, Alcatrazz appeared on the second series of the BBC TV programme Rock School, with Bonnet providing singing tips. The programme also included clips of Alcatrazz in rehearsal. Later that year, Alcatrazz disbanded, and Bonnet returned to his solo career. In 2009, Bonnet reformed Alcatrazz with three new musicians. Bonnet did not consult with his former bandmates Uvena and Waldo about re-forming the original line-up, and in response they also re-grouped as a separate version of Alcatrazz.

Bonnet later reformed his version of the band as Alcatrazz featuring Graham Bonnet with guitarist Howie Simon (Jeff Scott Soto Band, Talisman), drummer Glen Sobel (Impellitteri, Beautiful Creatures, Tony MacAlpine), and bassist Tim Luce and toured Japan in May and June 2007—sharing the headline with another ex-Rainbow vocalist, Joe Lynn Turner. Howie Simon revealed in a 2010 interview that it was his suggestion to bring back the Alcatrazz name. They also headlined the BerkRock festival in Berkovitsa, Bulgaria, in July 2008 and have played various West Coast US dates including support slots for Y&T. Alcatrazz continued to perform live occasionally until 2014.

In March 2017, three-fifths of the original lineup (Bonnet, Waldo and Shea) reunited for three shows in Japan, which also included Conrado Pesinato and Mark Benquechea on guitar and drums respectively. The performances were recorded for the live album/DVD Parole Denied – Tokyo 2017, which was released on 7 December 2018.

In February 2019, Bonnet confirmed that he had once again resurrected Alcatrazz, with a new lineup featuring himself, Waldo, Benquechea, Beth-Ami Heavenstone, as well as new guitarist Joe Stump. Heavenstone thus briefly became Alcatrazz's first female member, having played bass in The Graham Bonnet Band, where she was Waldo's bandmate. This lineup planned to record a new album together, which would also include contributions from Chris Impellitteri, Bob Kulick, Dario Mollo and former Alcatrazz guitarist Steve Vai. Shea returned to Alcatrazz in January 2020 to replace Heavenstone.

== Later career ==
Bonnet's post-Alcatrazz projects have all been short-lived and included Blackthorne (working with ex-Balance guitarist Bob Kulick, brother of Kiss guitarist Bruce Kulick), backing vocals for the Danish heavy metal band Pretty Maids' Future World and numerous session work for Forcefield, appearing on To Oz and Back and Let The Wild Run Free. In 1988, Bonnet joined Impellitteri, for their album Stand in Line.

An appearance on Eddie Hardin and Pete York's musical adaptation of Wind in The Willows, performed live in Germany in 1991, saw Bonnet sing on around six of the songs alongside fellow musicians Jon Lord, Don Airey and Ray Fenwick amongst others. Fenwick and Airey also featured heavily on Bonnet's 1991 solo album Here Comes The Night which includes several covers as well as songs credited to his then wife Jo Eime, and another remake of the Marbles' "Only One Woman".

In 1997, he released Underground, a new solo album, which helped re-establish him with his fan base in Japan. 1999's The Day I Went Mad featured guitarist Slash, Def Leppard guitarist Vivian Campbell, Bruce Kulick plus guitarist, Mario Parga.

Bonnet contributed lead vocals to the Japanese heavy metal band Anthem's 2000 release Heavy Metal Anthem, which had reworks of classic Anthem tracks. Bonnet rejoined Impellitteri in 2000 for their System X album. Meanwhile, his 1999 Japanese solo album got a UK release in September 2001.

At the back end of 2001, Bonnet went on a solo UK tour. His band included keyboard player Don Airey, bassist Chris Childs and drummer Harry James of Thunder and guitarist Dario Mollo.

In early 2004, Bonnet joined Italian guitarist Dario Mollo's new project Elektric Zoo, touring Europe during April. Maintaining the Italian connection, the singer also participated in Matteo Filippini's project, Moonstone, featuring on the track "Not Dead Yet".

In 2006, Bonnet contributed vocals to the Welcome to America album by Taz Taylor Band. The band toured the UK in 2007 and Europe in 2008.

He also appeared in the Countdown Spectacular concert series in Australia between August and September 2007. He sang two songs, "Warm Ride" and "It's All Over Now, Baby Blue".

A press release dated 6 November 2008 reported that Bonnet would be contributing vocals for a highlights CD with the metal opera project, Lyraka. The album Lyraka Volume 1 was released on 2 November 2010. It was announced on 17 November 2010, that Bonnet would also be featured on Lyraka Volume 2.

Bonnet currently resides in Los Angeles, California, from where he continues to record and tour extensively. Bonnet toured the UK with Rainbow tribute band Catch the Rainbow starting in March 2014.

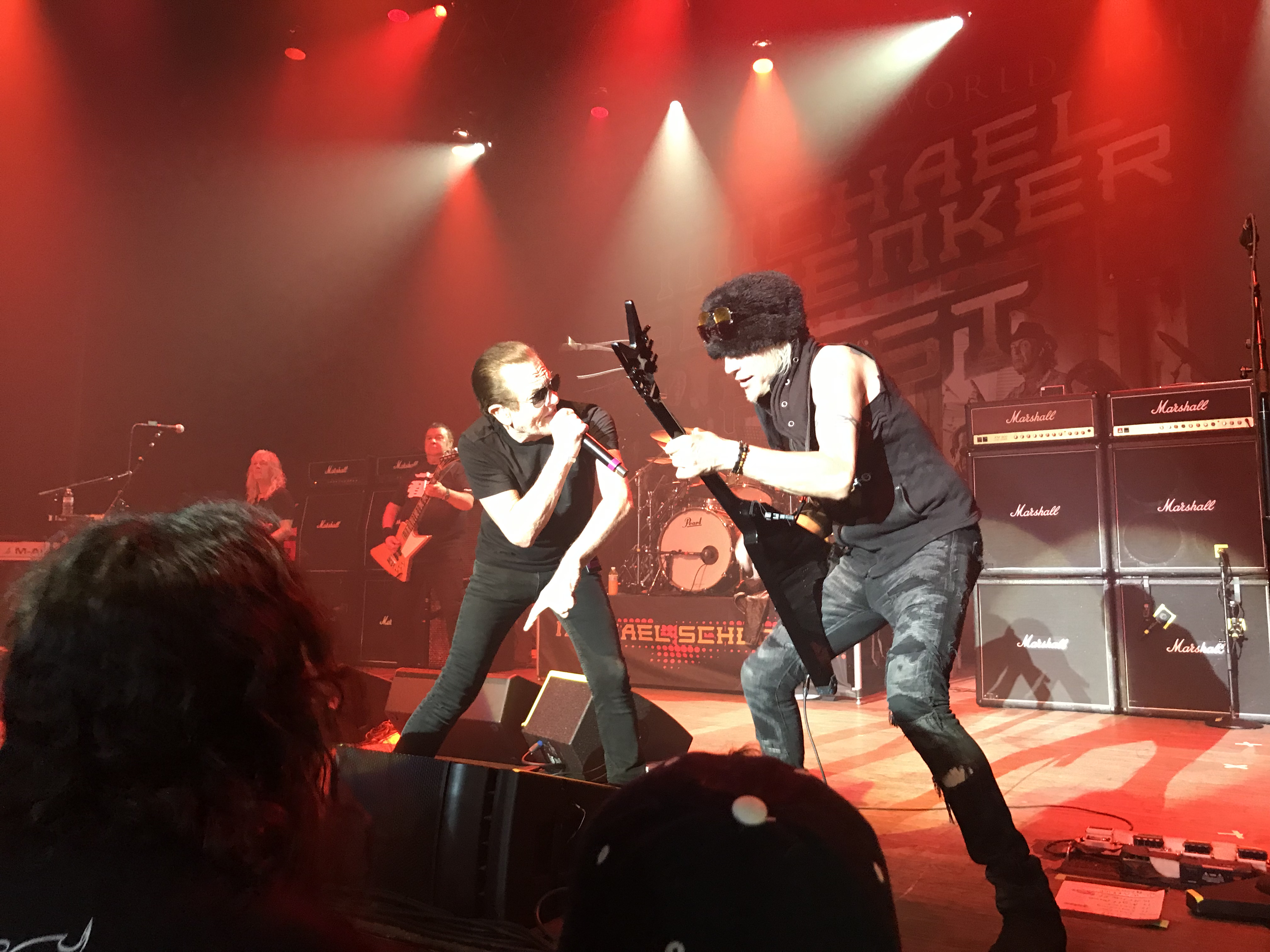
Graham singing with Michael Schenker in 2019

He collaborated in the Stardust Reverie Project, a supergroup featuring Zak Stevens and Lynn Meredith among others. Their first album Ancient Rites of the Moon was released in April 2014. He contributed on vocals in one track of the second Stardust Reverie album Proclamation of Shadows, which came out in March 2015.

In 2015, Bonnet formed the Graham Bonnet Band, and toured the UK and Europe, playing songs from throughout his career including Alcatrazz and Rainbow. The band released a two-song E.P. titled My Kingdom Come, (the song "My Kingdom Come", written by Russ Ballard) and announced work on a new studio album to be recorded featuring new compositions and a bonus disc consisting of re-recordings of a number of songs from Bonnet's career. The final line-up of The Graham Bonnet Band was: Graham Bonnet, vocals; Conrado Pesinato, guitars; Beth-Ami Heavenstone, bass; Mark Zonder (Ex-Fates Warning), drums. The band resumed touring toward the end of 2016.

On 4 November 2016, The Graham Bonnet Band released their debut album, The Book. Reviews were positive, with the Real Gone website calling the album "surprisingly good" and also stating that some of the tracks "exceeded expectations by some distance". Heavenstone later joined Bonnet in a refounded Alcatrazz (see above).

In 2016, Bonnet joined Michael Schenker and fellow former MSG singers Gary Barden and Robin McAuley in Michael Schenker Fest, initially for a tour of Japan. This resulted in a CD/DVD Live – Tokyo International Forum Hall. Later tours of Europe and Japan followed. In 2017, with the addition of Temple of Rock singer Doogie White (another former Rainbow vocalist), Michael Schenker Fest recorded the album Resurrection featuring vocal contributions from all four singers. This line-up toured the US and Europe in 2018. The Graham Bonnet Band released their second album Meanwhile, Back In The Garage in 2018, and their third album Day Out In Nowhere in 2022

Bonnet was extensively interviewed for two books by author Greg Prato: 2016's The Other Side of Rainbow and 2017's Shredders!: The Oral History Of Speed Guitar (And More).

== Film and television appearances ==
- 1975: Three for All (performer)
- 1980: Rainbow – Monsters of Rock, Donington '80 (performer)
- 1985: Rainbow – The Final Cut (performer)
- 2003: Wind in the Willows – A Rock Concert '91 (performer)
- 2006: Rainbow – In Their Own Words (interviewee)
- 2006: Heavy Metal – Louder than Life (interviewee)
- 2015: The Ritchie Blackmore Story (interviewee)

== Bands ==
Years active	Name	Members				
Years active	Name	Vocals	Guitar	Bass	Drums	Keyboards
1965–1967	The Blue Sect	Graham Bonnet; Roger Sleath	Graham Bonnet	Roger Sleath	Steve Hardy	
1967–1968	The Graham Bonnet Set	Graham Bonnet; Trevor Gordon			Steve Hardy	
1968–1969	The Marbles	Graham Bonnet; Trevor Gordon		no-one		
1975	Southern Comfort			Graham Bonnet		
1979–1980	Rainbow	Graham Bonnet	Ritchie Blackmore	Roger Glover	Cozy Powell	Don Airey
02/1982-27 August 1982	Michael Schenker Group	Graham Bonnet	Michael Schenker	Chris Glen	Ted McKenna	Tommy Eyre
1983–1984	Alcatrazz	Graham Bonnet	Yngwie Malmsteen	Gary Shea	Jan Uvena	Jimmy Waldo
1984–1986	Alcatrazz	Graham Bonnet	Steve Vai	Gary Shea	Jan Uvena	Jimmy Waldo
1986–1987	Alcatrazz	Graham Bonnet	Danny Johnson	Gary Shea	Jan Uvena	Jimmy Waldo
1987	The Party Boys	Graham Bonnet	Kevin Borich; John Brewster	Alan Lancaster	Paul Christie; Richard Harvey	no-one
1988	Anthem	Graham Bonnet	Hiroya Fukuda	Naoto Shibata	Takamasa Ohuchi	no-one
1988	Impellitteri	Graham Bonnet	Chris Impellitteri	Chuck Wright	Pat Torpey	Phil Wolfe
1988–1990	Impellitteri	Graham Bonnet	Chris Impellitteri	Dave Spitz	Stet Howland	Phil Wolfe
1989	Forcefield	Graham Bonnet	Ray Fenwick; Jan Akkerman	Mo Foster; Terry Pack	Cozy Powell	no-one
1990	Forcefield	Graham Bonnet	Ray Fenwick; Micky Moody; Bernie Marsden; Mario Parga	Terry Pack	Cozy Powell	Don Airey; Tim Hinkley; Chris Cozens
1993	Blackthorne	Graham Bonnet	Bob Kulick	Chuck Wright	Frankie Banali	Jimmy Waldo
2000–2001	Anthem (Featuring Graham Bonnet)	Graham Bonnet	Akio Shimizu	Naoto Shibata	Hirotsugu Homma	no-one
2000–2003	Impellitteri	Graham Bonnet	Chris Impellitteri	James Amelio Pulli	Glen Sobel	Edward Harris Roth
2004	Elektric Zoo	Graham Bonnet	Dario Mollo	Guido Block	Roberto Gualdi	Maurizio Belluzzo
2006–2008	Taz Taylor Band	Graham Bonnet	Taz Taylor	Dirk Krause	Val Trainor	Bob Miller
2006–2009	Alcatrazz (Featuring Graham Bonnet)	Graham Bonnet	Howie Simon	Tim Luce	Glen Sobel	no-one
2009–2010	Alcatrazz (Featuring Graham Bonnet)	Graham Bonnet	Howie Simon	Tim Luce	Dave Dzialak	no-one
2010–2011	Alcatrazz (Featuring Graham Bonnet)	Graham Bonnet	Howie Simon	Tim Luce	Jeff Bowders	no-one
2011–2014	Alcatrazz (Featuring Graham Bonnet)	Graham Bonnet	Howie Simon	Tim Luce	Bobby Rock	no-one
2009	Savage Paradise	Graham Bonnet	Mario Parga	Tim Luce	Kevin Valentine	Eric Ragno
2014–2015	Graham Bonnet Band	Graham Bonnet	Conrado Pesinato	Beth-Ami Heavenstone	Chase Manhattan	no-one
2016	Graham Bonnet Band	Graham Bonnet	Conrado Pesinato	Beth-Ami Heavenstone	Mark Zonder	Jimmy Waldo
2016–2020	Michael Schenker Fest	Gary Barden; Graham Bonnet; Robin McAuley; Doogie White	Michael Schenker	Chris Glen	Ted McKenna	Steve Mann
2017	Ezoo	Graham Bonnet	Dario Mollo	Dario Patti	Roberto Gualdi	Dario Patti
2017	Alcatrazz (Reunion show)	Graham Bonnet	Conrado Pesinato	Gary Shea	Mark Benquechea	Jimmy Waldo
2017–2019	Graham Bonnet Band	Graham Bonnet	Kurt James	Beth-Ami Heavenstone	Mark Benquechea	Jimmy Waldo
2019–2020	Alcatrazz	Graham Bonnet	Joe Stump	Beth-Ami Heavenstone	Mark Benquechea	Jimmy Waldo
2020	Alcatrazz	Graham Bonnet	Joe Stump	Gary Shea	Mark Benquechea	Jimmy Waldo
2020	Anthem	Graham Bonnet; Yukio Morikawa	Akio Shimizu	Naoto Shibata	Isamu Tamaru	no-one
2021-present	Alcatrazz (Graham Bonnet's Alcatrazz)	Graham Bonnet	Jeff Loomis			
2021-2023	Graham Bonnet Band	Graham Bonnet	Conrado Pesinato	Beth-Ami Heavenstone	Kyle Hughes	Alessandro Bertoni, Danny Mattin
2024-present	Graham Bonnet Band	Graham Bonnet	Conrado Pesinato	Beth-Ami Heavenstone	Francis Cassol	Alessandro Bertoni, Danny Mattin
