= No Parole from Rock 'n' Roll =

Studio album by Alcatrazz
- Released: October 1983
- Studios: Rocshire Studios, Anaheim, California Skyline Studios, Topanga, California
- Genres: Hard rock, heavy metal
- Length: 41:20
- Labels: Rocshire (US); RCA (Europe)
- Producer: Dennis Mackay

Alcatrazz chronology
No Parole from Rock 'n' Roll (1983)	Live Sentence (1984)

Singles from No Parole from Rock 'n' Roll
- 1. "Island in the Sun" / "Hiroshima Mon Amour" Released: 1983

Professional ratings
Review scores
Source	Rating
AllMusic	4/5 stars
Collector's Guide to Heavy Metal	10/10
Kerrang!	Unfavourable

No Parole from Rock 'n' Roll is the debut album by American heavy metal band Alcatrazz, led by veteran singer Graham Bonnet, released in 1983. It spent seven weeks on the Billboard 200 albums chart, peaking at No. 128. The album precipitated guitarist Yngwie Malmsteen's solo career, and is most famous for the single "Island in the Sun".

== Track listing ==
Side one
No.	Title	Writer(s)	Length
1.	"Island in the Sun"	Graham Bonnet, Yngwie Malmsteen, Jimmy Waldo	3:55
2.	"General Hospital"	Bonnet, Malmsteen, Waldo	4:49
3.	"Jet to Jet"	Bonnet, Malmsteen	4:27
4.	"Hiroshima Mon Amour"	Bonnet, Malmsteen	4:00
5.	"Kree Nakoorie"	Bonnet, Malmsteen, Waldo	6:10

Side two
No.	Title	Writer(s)	Length
1.	"Incubus" (Instrumental)	Malmsteen	1:24
2.	"Too Young to Die, Too Drunk to Live"	Bonnet, Malmsteen	4:20
3.	"Big Foot"	Bonnet, Malmsteen	4:06
4.	"Starcarr Lane"	Bonnet, Malmsteen, Waldo	3:53
5.	"Suffer Me"	Bonnet, Malmsteen	4:16

== Personnel ==
- Graham Bonnet – lead & backing vocals
- Yngwie Malmsteen – guitars
- Jimmy Waldo – keyboards
- Gary Shea – bass guitar
- Jan Uvena – drums

=== Production ===
- Dennis Mackay – producer, mixing
- Willie Harlen – engineer, mixing
- Nick Newton – logo design
- Bad Samuels – art direction
- Mark Sokol – artwork
- Andrew Trueman – executive producer, management
