= Jan Uvena =

American drummer

- Born: Jannaro Uvena; August 29, 1950 (age 76); Huntington, New York, U.S.
- Genres: Hard rock; heavy metal
- Occupations: Musician; songwriter
- Instruments: Drums; percussion; vocals
- Years active: 1978–2000

Jannaro "Jan" Uvena (born August 29, 1950) is an American musician, best known for playing drums with a number of notable rock bands, including Alice Cooper's backing band, Iron Butterfly, Alcatrazz, and Signal.

Uvena retired from the music business in 2000 and, as of 2016, manages a U.S. Cellular store in Walpole, New Hampshire. As of 2025, he is retired and living in Keene, New Hampshire.

== Discography ==
=== with Bonnie Pointer ===
- Bonnie Pointer (1979)

=== with Pipedream ===
- Pipedream (1979)

=== with Alice Cooper ===
- Zipper Catches Skin (1982)

=== with Alcatrazz ===
- No Parole from Rock 'n' Roll (1983)
- Live Sentence (1984)
- Metallic Live '84 VHS (1984)
- Disturbing the Peace (1985)
- Power Live '85 VHS (1985)
- Dangerous Games (1986)
- Live '83 (2010)
- Live In Japan 1984 Complete Edition (2018)

=== with Signal ===
- Loud & Clear (1989)
- Live (2000)

=== with Jonas Hansson Band ===
- No. 1 (1994)
- Second To None (1996)
- The Rocks (1999)
