= I Can't See Nobody =

1967 song by the Bee Gees

Single by the Bee Gees

from the album Bee Gees' 1st
- A-side: "New York Mining Disaster 1941"
- Released: April 1967 (UK); May 1967 (US); June 1967 (Australia)
- Recorded: 7, 13 March 1967
- Studio: IBC (London)
- Genre: Baroque pop; psychedelic pop
- Length: 3:45
- Label: Polydor (UK); Atco (US); Spin Records (Australia)
- Songwriters: Barry Gibb; Robin Gibb
- Producers: Robert Stigwood; Ossie Byrne

Bee Gees flipsides singles chronology
"Big Chance" (1967)	"I Can't See Nobody" (1967)	"Close Another Door" (1967)

"I Can't See Nobody" is a song by the Bee Gees, released first as the B-side of "New York Mining Disaster 1941". With "New York Mining Disaster 1941", this song was issued as a double A in Germany and Japan, and included on the group's third LP, Bee Gees' 1st. "I Can't See Nobody" charted for one week at number 128 on the Billboard Bubbling Under the Hot 100 in July 1967.

== Writing and recording ==
It was written by Barry and Robin Gibb in 1966 towards the end of the family's time living in Australia. Maurice Gibb has sometimes been listed as a co-writer for the song, most notably on the compilation Bee Gees Gold. According to Nat Kipner, the song was recorded at St. Clair Studios. Robin has said that it was written in Brisbane, Australia, where the band toured in November 1966, but that the first version was not released.

At the Bee Gees' 1st sessions, this song was recorded on 7 March, with remixing and overdubbing on 13 March. Robin sang lead on the verses while all three brothers featured on the chorus. Robin's voice on this track was higher than the other songs on the album, especially on the line Don't ask me why.

== Personnel ==
- Robin Gibb – lead vocals
- Barry Gibb – rhythm guitar, backing vocals
- Maurice Gibb – bass guitar, piano, harpsichord, backing vocals
- Colin Petersen – drums
- Bill Shepherd – orchestral arrangement

== Cover versions ==
Nina Simone recorded and released this song in the UK as the B-side of "To Love Somebody", another cover by Simone lifted from the Bee Gees' 1st album. The two songs were included on her 1969 album To Love Somebody. Le Orme covered this song and recorded and released in the same year "Mita Mita" in Italy.

=== The Marbles version ===
"I Can't See Nobody"

Single by the Marbles

from the album The Marbles
- B-side: "Little Boy"
- Released: May 1969 (US); August 1969 (Germany)
- Genre: Big band
- Length: 3:23
- Label: Polydor (UK, Germany, France); Cotillion (US)
- Songwriters: Barry Gibb; Robin Gibb
- Producer: Barry Gibb

The Marbles singles chronology
"The Walls Fell Down" (1969)	"I Can't See Nobody" (1969)	"Breaking Up Is Hard to Do" (1970)

The Marbles covered the song, their version being released in August 1969 as their third single in the United States. The Marbles covered the song in August that year, it was also released as a single in Germany and France. The Marbles had recently worked with the Gibb brothers between 1968 and 1969, but the brothers were not involved on the Marbles version. The arrangement was by Jimmy Horowitz. Its flipside was "Little Boy" was also written by the Gibb brothers.

The song was included in 1970 on their only self-titled album. Their version was later used as the B-side of the duo's last single "Breaking Up Is Hard to Do".
