= Blackthorne (band) =

American hard rock band

Blackthorne was an American hard rock project, that involved Bob Kulick on guitar, Graham Bonnet on vocals, Frankie Banali on drums, Jimmy Waldo on keyboards, and Chuck Wright on bass. The group released the album Afterlife through CMC International (US) and Music For Nations (Europe) in 1993.

Kulick and Bonnet have performed as an acoustic duo on several TV shows in Europe and Japan to promote the album.

== Track list and songwriting credits ==
1. "Cradle to the Grave" (Robert 'Bob' Kulick / Jimmy Waldo / Graham Bonnet / Steve C. Rosen) - 4:42
2. "Afterlife" (G. Bonnet / J. Waldo / R. Kulick / S. Rosen) - 5:23
3. "We Won't Be Forgotten" (R. Kulick / Bruce Kulick / Paul 'Taylor' Horovwitz) - 5:58
4. "Breaking The Chains" (R. Kulick / Dennis 'St.James' Feldman / Kjell Erik Nikanor Benner / Chuck Burgi) - 4:53
5. "Over and Over" (R. Kulick / B. Kulick / Steve Plunkett) - 4:45
6. "Hard Feelings" (R. Kulick / Mark Ferrari) - 4:44
7. "Baby You're The Blood" (R. Kulick / J.Waldo / S. Plunkett) -3:24
8. "Sex Crime" (G. Bonnet / R. Kulick / J. Waldo / S. Plunkett) - 4:55
9. "Love From The Ashes" (G. Bonnet / J. Waldo / R. Kulick / S. Rosen) - 4:36
10. "All Night Long" (Roger Glover / Ritchie Blackmore) - 5:04
- Backing Vocals [Additional] – Astrid Young, Paul Rodriguez, Stella Stevens, Steve Plunkett
- Bass Guitar, Backing Vocals, Bells [Funeral Bells] – Chuck Wright
- Cover [Cover Concept], Design [Design & Lettering] – Wendy Kramer Grady
- Drums, Percussion – Frankie Banali
- Guitar, Backing Vocals – Robert 'Bob' Kulick
- Keyboards [Blackkeys], Organ [Hammond B3], Backing Vocals – Jimmy Waldo
- Lead Vocals, Backing Vocals – Graham Bonnet
- Mastered By – Wally Traugott
- Photography By [Additional Photo] – Tom Wallace
- Photography By [Front & Back Cover & Innersleeve] – John Harrell
- Producer – Bob Kulick
- Recorded By, Mixed By – Mikey Davis

Recorded & mixed at SoundchanberStudios, North Hollywood, California.

Reissued onto LP in 2021 by Renaissance Records

This recording is dedicated to the memory of Jo Levine
