= The Walls Fell Down =

Single by The Marbles
- B-side: "Love You"
- Released: March 1969
- Recorded: 10 January 1969; IBC Studios, London
- Genre: Baroque pop, psychedelic pop
- Length: 3:02
- Label: Polydor (UK); Cotillion (US)
- Songwriter(s): Barry, Robin & Maurice Gibb
- Producer(s): Barry Gibb, Robin Gibb, Maurice Gibb, Robert Stigwood

The Marbles singles chronology
"Only One Woman" (1968)	"The Walls Fell Down" (1969)	"I Can't See Nobody" (1969)

"The Walls Fell Down" is the second single by the English rock duo The Marbles with Lead vocals by Graham Bonnet. It was released in March 1969, and was written and produced by Barry Gibb, Robin Gibb, Maurice Gibb, of the Bee Gees, and was produced by Robert Stigwood.

== Background ==
"The Walls Fell Down" was recorded on 10 January 1969 with other Gibb brothers-penned tracks "Love You" and "Little Boy". An instrumental work by three members of Bee Gees: Barry and Maurice Gibb, and drummer Colin Petersen. The song was released as a follow-up to "Only One Woman" but did not repeat the success of the previous single in the United Kingdom. It reached No. 28 on the UK Singles Chart, but in the Netherlands it reached No. 2.

A promotional video for this song was also released. The song's original music video features Bonnet with a Gibson SG and Gordon with an acoustic guitar and was televised on a Dutch television. A French TV performance of "The Walls Fell Down" was televised on 192TV.

== Personnel ==
- Graham Bonnet — lead vocals
- Trevor Gordon — backing vocals
- Barry Gibb — guitar
- Maurice Gibb — bass, piano
- Colin Petersen — drums
- Bill Shepherd — orchestral arrangement

== Chart performance ==
Chart (1969)	Peak position
Belgium (Ultratop 50 Wallonia)	22
France (SNEP)	92
Netherlands (Dutch Top 40)	3
Netherlands (Single Top 100)	2
New Zealand (Recorded Music NZ)	10
UK Singles (Official Charts Company)	28
