= The Marbles (duo) =

British rock duo

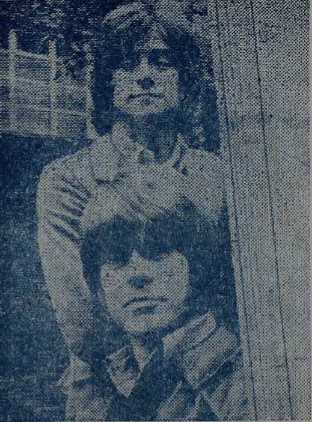

Background information
- Origin: London, England
- Genres: Pop, baroque pop
- Years active: 1968–1969
- Labels: Polydor, Cotillion
- Members: Graham Bonnet; Trevor Gordon

The Marbles were an English rock duo that consisted of Graham Bonnet and Trevor Gordon, who operated between 1968 and 1969. Their only well-known singles were "Only One Woman" and "The Walls Fell Down". They also became associated with the Bee Gees members Barry, Robin and Maurice Gibb at that time.

"Only One Woman" reached number 5 in the UK Singles Chart in November 1968. The duo disbanded in 1969. Shortly after their split, in 1970, they released their only self-titled album.

== History ==
Bonnet and Gordon were cousins. They were born in Skegness, Lincolnshire, England, although his webpage, In Memory Of, states Gordon was born 18 May 1948, in Blackpool, Lancashire, England. While Bonnet stayed in England, Gordon grew up in Australia where he met the Bee Gees for the first time in 1964, on which Gordon recorded "House Without Windows" and "And I'll Be Happy"; both songs were written by Barry Gibb. In 1965, Gordon recorded two other Barry Gibb compositions: "Little Miss Rhythm and Blues" and "Here I Am". Gordon returned to England in 1966 and recorded one single as 'Trev Gordon' then returned to Australia, and returned to England again in 1967 to join Graham's band the Graham Bonnet Set. In 1968, they became the Marbles, and signed a recording contract with the Australian record label impresario, Robert Stigwood. Although Stigwood signed only Bonnet and Gordon, drummer Steve Hardy from the Blue Sect/the Graham Bonnet Set, continued to work with them. Hardy's vocal work was on the song "By the Light of the Burning Candle" (with vocals by Gordon originally, later, the song was reworked in July 1968 with Bonnet on vocals).

They were befriended by the Gibb brothers Barry, Robin and Maurice Gibb of the Bee Gees who wrote six songs for them, and provided some backing vocals. "Only One Woman" was released in the UK and the U.S. in August 1968; the single reached the top 5 in the UK and was their biggest hit. Following the release of the group's debut single, Bonnet made a remark to a reporter as to "Only One Woman" being a bit boring, angering Barry. Their second single, "The Walls Fell Down" only reached number 28 on the same chart. But in the Netherlands it was more successful, where it reached number 3 in their top 40 in April 1969. Their third single, "I Can't See Nobody", a cover of the 1967 Bee Gees song which was arranged by Jimmy Horowitz, was only released in Europe, except in the UK. By 1969, the Marbles had split. Their fourth and last single, "Breaking Up Is Hard to Do" (third in Britain) did not chart internationally. "I Can't See Nobody" was chosen as the B-side in the UK, "Daytime" in Europe and "Little Laughing Girl" in America. In August 1970, Cotillion Records released their only self-titled album in the United States.

After the split, Bonnet started a lengthy solo career. From 1979 to 1980, he was the lead singer with Ritchie Blackmore's Rainbow. While Gordon released one solo album Alphabet, he later became a music teacher and died in 2013 in London.

== Discography ==
=== Albums ===
- The Marbles

(1970, US : Cotillion CD 9029 / Germany : Polydor 184-365)
Side One:
"I Can't See Nobody" / "A House Is Not a Home" / "Storybook Children" / "Daytime" / "By the Light of a Burning Candle" / "Stay with Me Baby"
Side Two:
"Only One Woman" / "To Love Somebody" / "Breaking Up Is Hard to Do" / "Elizabeth Johnson" / "Little Laughing Girl" / "The Walls Fell Down"

- The Marbles

(2003, Germany : CD re-issue Repertoire REPUK 1014)
Same tracks and running order as on original release plus 6 bonus tracks, all original mono single versions:
"Only One Woman" / "By the Light of a Burning Candle" / "The Walls Fell Down" / "Love You" / "I Can't See Nobody" / "Little Boy"

Compilations

- Marble-ized

(1994, Australia : Polydor 523-866-2)
Same tracks and running order as on original 1970 album The Marbles plus extra final track: "Love You"

=== Singles ===
Year	Title (A-side b/w B-side)	Peak chart Positions			Comments
Year	Title (A-side b/w B-side)	UK	NL	AUS	Comments
1968	"Only One Woman" b/w "By the Light of a Burning Candle"	5	3	23	UK : Polydor 56272 / NL : Polydor 59 225 / AUS : Polydor Int. NH-59225 / US : Cotillion 45-44003
1969	"The Walls Fell Down" b/w "Love You"	28	2	71	UK : Polydor 56310 / NL : Polydor 59 263 / AUS : Polydor Int. NH-59263 / US : Cotillion 45-44029
1969	"I Can't See Nobody" b/w "Little Boy"	–	–	–	NL : Polydor 59 311 / US : Cotillion 45-44036
1970	"Breaking Up Is Hard to Do" b/w "I Can't See Nobody"	–	–	–	UK : Polydor 56378
1970	"Breaking Up Is Hard to Do" b/w "Daytime"	–	–	–	NL : Polydor 2058 010
1970	"Breaking Up Is Hard to Do" b/w "A House Is Not a Home"	–	–	–	PT : Polydor 56 378
1970	"Breaking Up Is Hard to Do" b/w "Little Laughing Girl"	–	–	–	US : Cotillion 45-44046
