= Alcatrazz =

American rock band

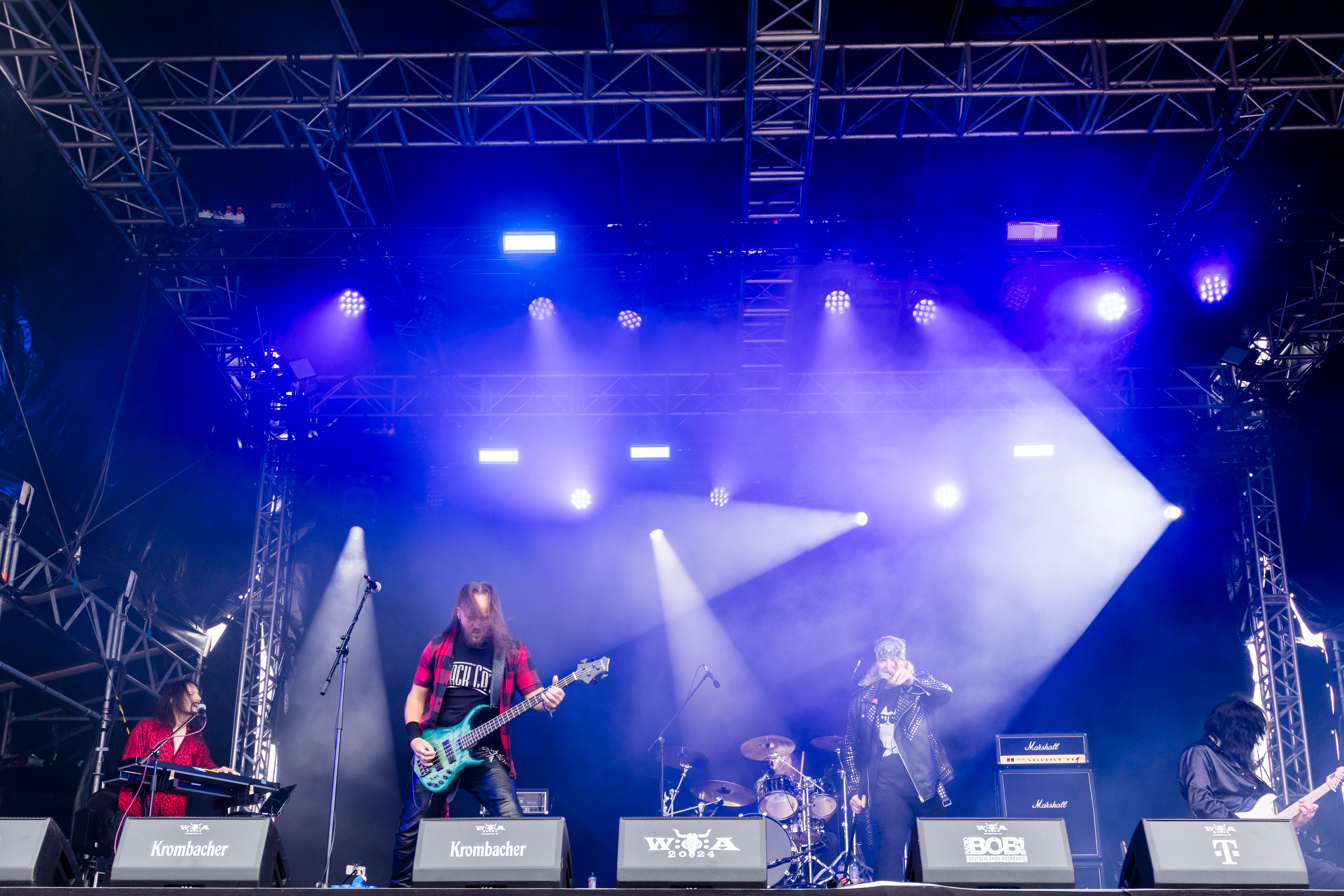
- Alcatrazz in 2024

Background information
- Origin: Los Angeles, California, U.S.
- Genres: Hard rock, heavy metal
- Years active: 1983–1987; 2006–2014; 2019–present
- Labels: Rocshire/MCA; Capitol; Silver Lining Music; BraveWords
- Spinoffs: Blackthorne
- Spinoff of: New England
- Members: Waldo-Shea lineup: Giles Lavery; Jimmy Waldo; Gary Shea; Joe Stump; Graham Bonnet lineup: Graham Bonnet; Jeff Loomis; Van Williams
- Past members: Yngwie Malmsteen; Jan Uvena; Steve Vai; Danny Johnson; Doogie White

Alcatrazz is an American rock band formed in 1983 by Graham Bonnet, Jimmy Waldo, and Gary Shea. They are best known for their songs "Island in the Sun", "Hiroshima Mon Amour", and "God Blessed Video". They are also notable for featuring a previously unknown Yngwie Malmsteen as their lead guitarist for a year, who was then replaced by Steve Vai, with whom they recorded one album.

Following an internal disagreement and split in 2020, there are currently two separate and distinct Alcatrazz lineups, one featuring Bonnet, and another featuring Waldo and Shea.

The band went through a number of lineup changes, with Bonnet being the only member to be in every incarnation of Alcatrazz. Yngwie Malmsteen was the original guitarist of Alcatrazz from 1983 to 1984, and was subsequently replaced by Steve Vai, and then by Danny Johnson in the original incarnation of the band up until 1987. Joe Stump became the Alcatrazz guitarist when the band reformed, and remains the guitarist in the Waldo-Shea lineup of Alcatrazz. In June 2021, Jeff Loomis was announced as the guitarist in the Bonnet lineup of Alcatrazz.

After breaking up in 1987, Bonnet toured from 2006 to 2014 as Alcatrazz featuring Graham Bonnet with various lineups, before a one-off reunion show in 2017 led to Bonnet and Waldo reforming the band once more in 2020, with Shea rejoining shortly after. From their inception in 1983 until 2020, Alcatrazz released four studio albums: No Parole from Rock 'n' Roll (1983), Disturbing the Peace (1985), Dangerous Games (1986), and Born Innocent (2020). Several months after the release of Born Innocent, Bonnet and the other four members of Alcatrazz – Waldo, Shea, Stump, and drummer Mark Benquechea – announced a split from one another, with both camps intending to continue to record music under the name Alcatrazz. The Waldo-Shea-Stump-Benquechea camp announced that Doogie White was now their lead singer, and released the studio album V in October 2021. Meanwhile, Bonnet announced that he was moving forward once again with his own version of Alcatrazz. In June 2021, Jeff Loomis was announced as the guitarist for the Bonnet lineup of Alcatrazz, with a new studio album in the works.

In March 2024, following the departure of Doogie White, Giles Lavery became the new Alactrazz vocalist, alongside Jimmy Waldo, Gary Shea and Joe Stump.

== History ==
The band's initial lineup consisted of former Rainbow singer frontman Graham Bonnet, young Swedish guitarist Yngwie Malmsteen, who had recently left the American metal band Steeler, Gary Shea and Jimmy Waldo from New England and Clive Burr of Iron Maiden fame. Burr was reportedly only in the band for a week, and left upon discovering the band was going to be based in the United States, as opposed to his native England. Burr was soon replaced by former Iron Butterfly drummer Jan Uvena, who had just left Alice Cooper's backing band. Shea dubbed the group "Alcatrazz". For the first album, the bulk of the material was written by Bonnet and Malmsteen, with Waldo contributing to several tracks.

The band's debut album, No Parole from Rock 'n' Roll was released in late 1983 on Rocshire Records. Decent support was given by MTV to the lead single, "Island in the Sun", which showed a heavy Rainbow influence. Despite the commercial nature of the song, it received little radio play. The album nonetheless spent 18 weeks on the Billboard charts and peaked at No. 128. A second video released in 1984 for "Hiroshima Mon Amour" became popular in Japan.

Rochsire then released Live Sentence (1984), a concert recording with songs from both concerts of the recent tour of Japan at the Nakano Sun Plaza in Tokyo on January 28, 1984. Being discontent with the sonic qualities of the recording, Malmsteen tried to prevent the release of the album but failed. Some Rainbow covers were included, including "Since You Been Gone". The album peaked at No. 133 in the US. A live video concert was also produced. During this period, internal turmoil began surfacing within the band, between Malmsteen and Bonnet. According to Malmsteen, Bonnet had become fed up with the attention drawn to his guitar playing from fans over Bonnet's vocals. According to Malmsteen, their professional relationship ended with the two having an altercation on stage after Bonnet allegedly tampered with Malmsteen's amplifiers during a guitar solo and "Since You Been Gone" at a show in Oklahoma. This resulted in Malmsteen yelling at and arguing with Bonnet, Bonnet poking Malmsteen in the stomach with his microphone stand, and finally with Malmsteen punching Bonnet, all taking place on stage. Following this, Malmsteen left Alcatrazz and created his own band called Rising Force, who signed with Polydor Records and released a successful self-titled debut album.

Waldo replaced Malmsteen with former Frank Zappa guitarist Steve Vai, despite resistance from Bonnet, and the band signed with Capitol Records after Rocshire was shut down following the owners being arrested for the embezzlement of millions of dollars. With Steve Vai, the group worked on new material and then headlined another tour of Japan, which introduced Vai to the fans and allowed them to play new material from the upcoming album. A concert video was filmed from these dates.

The band released Disturbing the Peace in the spring of 1985. The album was produced by Eddie Kramer who had worked with Led Zeppelin, Jimi Hendrix, and Triumph, among others. "God Blessed Video" was the first single and video, yet MTV barely played it. The album peaked at No. 145 and charted for 16 weeks. Alcatrazz, however, could never break out of their small following and had to cut a tour short due to financial problems.

Steve Vai left to join David Lee Roth's solo band in 1986. The split was on good terms, as it was an offer Vai could not refuse. He was replaced by guitarist Danny Johnson, who recorded what became Alcatrazz's third studio album, Dangerous Games, released in September 1986. The album featured covers of the Animals' song "It's My Life" and Marbles' song "Only One Woman", the latter of which had been a UK hit for Bonnet in the late 1960s. Dangerous Games was not commercially or critically successful however, with Shea and Waldo leaving the band in early 1987 (Bonnet has both claimed that they left of their own volition and that they were fired at Johnson's behest). Shea was replaced by Johnson's former Axis bandmate and brother-in-law Jay Davis (who had contributed as a backing vocalist to Dangerous Games), with the band not opting to replace Waldo. Several demos were recorded by this new four piece lineup of Alcatrazz with the aim of securing a new record deal, but Johnson and Davis left the band upon receiving an invitation from Eddie Van Halen to join Private Life. Following this, Bonnet and Uvena decided not to continue and to break up the band.

Several attempts to reform Alcatrazz in the following years were unsuccessful - most notably in 1988 by Bonnet with Japanese guitarist Kuni Takeuchi and by Bonnet and Waldo in 1992 with guitarist Bob Kulick; the latter eventually morphed into the band Blackthorne.

In 1998, the Renaissance Records label issued The Best of Alcatrazz, a look back at the band's brief career. God Blessed Video appeared in the 2002 videogame soundtrack Grand Theft Auto: Vice City, playing on fictional rock station V-Rock.

Bonnet reformed his version of the band as Alcatrazz featuring Graham Bonnet with guitarist Howie Simon (Jeff Scott Soto Band, Talisman), drummer Glen Sobel (Impellitteri, Beautiful Creatures, Tony MacAlpine), and bassist Tim Luce and toured Japan in May and June 2007—sharing the headline with another ex-Rainbow vocalist, Joe Lynn Turner. Howie Simon revealed in a recent interview that it was his suggestion to bring back the Alcatrazz name. They also headlined the BerkRock festival in Berkovitsa, Bulgaria in July 2008 and have played various West Coast US dates including support slots for Y&T. Alcatrazz continued to perform live occasionally until 2014.

In March 2017, three-fifths of the original lineup (Bonnet, Waldo and Shea) reunited for three shows in Japan, which also included Conrado Pesinato and Mark Benquechea on guitar and drums respectively. The performances were recorded for the live album/DVD Parole Denied – Tokyo 2017, which was released on December 7, 2018. In February 2019, Bonnet confirmed that he had once again resurrected Alcatrazz, with a new lineup featuring himself, Waldo and Benquechea, as well as guitarist Joe Stump and bassist Beth-Ami Heavenstone. She briefly became the band's first female member, having been in Bonnet's namesake band. This lineup had planned to record a new album together, which was also said to be including contributions from Chris Impellitteri, Bob Kulick, Dario Mollo and former Alcatrazz guitarist Steve Vai. Heavenstone was replaced on bass in January 2020 by a returning Gary Shea. Alcatrazz's first studio album in 34 years, Born Innocent, was released on July 31, 2020.

On December 4, 2020, it was announced that Alcatrazz had parted ways with vocalist Graham Bonnet and recruited vocalist Doogie White following conflicts regarding the band's management. Within a few hours after this announcement, Bonnet announced that he would "still be recording and performing with Alcatrazz", with a new lineup to be announced in the spring of 2021, and a new album in the works. Bonnet later clarified that one of the reasons behind the split was the remaining members of the Born Innocent lineup wanted to "only tour" with his former manager Giles Lavery, and added that it "meant that they had quit." He also stated that he was "not bothered" by the existence of two bands named Alcatrazz, had "no plans to relinquish" the band name, and referred to his replacement Doogie White as a "good friend and a damn fine performer." On June 4, 2021, the first single from the White-fronted Alcatrazz, "Turn of the Wheel" was released. A few days later, Jeff Loomis (Nevermore, Sanctuary) was announced as the guitarist for the Bonnet-led lineup, now referred to as Graham Bonnet's Alcatrazz.

On July 23, 2021, the White-fronted version of Alcatrazz released another single, "Sword of Deliverance", and announced that their fifth album, titled V, would be released on October 15, 2021. Music videos were released for the singles "Turn of the Wheel" on June 4, 2021 and "Sword of Deliverance" on July 23, 2021.

On March 13, 2024, the band announced vocalist Doogie White had departed the band to focus on his solo career and was being replaced by Warlord vocalist Giles Lavery.

On May 12, 2025, Alcatrazz announced that they had signed with BraveWords Records and were planning to release a new album in 2026.

== Band members ==
=== Current members ===
- Jimmy Waldo – keyboards, synthesizers, keytar, piano, backing vocals (1983–1987, 2017, 2019–present)
- Gary Shea – bass, backing vocals (1983–1987, 2017, 2020–present)
- Joe Stump – guitars (2019–present)
- Giles Lavery – lead vocals (2024–present)
- Mark Benquechea – drums (2017, 2019–2021, 2025–present)

==== Graham Bonnet's Alcatrazz ====
- Graham Bonnet – lead vocals (1983-1987, 2006–2014, 2021–present; 1983–1987, 2017, 2019–2020 in Alcatrazz)
- Jeff Loomis – guitars (2021–present)
- Van Williams – drums (2024–present)

=== Former members ===
- Clive Burr – drums, percussion (1983; died 2013)
- Yngwie Malmsteen – guitars (1983–1984)
- Jan Uvena – drums, percussion, backing vocals (1983–1987)
- Steve Vai – guitars, backing vocals (1984–1986)
- Danny Johnson – guitars, backing vocals (1986–1987)
- Jay Davis – bass (1987)
- Conrado Pesinato – guitar (2017)
- Beth-Ami Heavenstone – bass (2019–2020)
- Doogie White – lead vocals (2020–2024)
- Larry Paterson – drums (2021–2025)

==== Alcatrazz featuring Graham Bonnet ====
- Howie Simon – guitars, backing vocals (2006–2014)
- Tim Luce – bass, backing vocals (2006–2014)
- Glen Sobel – drums, percussion, backing vocals (2006–2009)
- Dave Dzialak – drums, percussion (2009–2010)
- Jeff Bowders – drums, percussion (2010–2011)
- Bobby Rock – drums, percussion, backing vocals (2011–2014)

=== Lineups ===
Period	Members	Releases
1983	Graham Bonnet – lead vocals; Yngwie Malmsteen – guitars; Jimmy Waldo – keyboards, synthesizers, keytar, piano, backing vocals; Gary Shea – bass, backing vocals; Clive Burr – drums, percussion	none
1983–1984	Graham Bonnet – lead vocals; Yngwie Malmsteen – guitars; Jimmy Waldo – keyboards, synthesizers, keytar, piano, backing vocals; Gary Shea – bass, backing vocals; Jan Uvena – drums, percussion, backing vocals	No Parole from Rock 'n' Roll (1983); Live Sentence (1984); Metallic Live (VHS) (1984); No Parole from Rock 'n' Roll Tour – Live in Japan 1984.1.28 (DVD reissue) (2010); Live '83 (2010); Live in Japan 1984 – Complete Edition (2018)
1984–1985	Graham Bonnet – lead vocals; Steve Vai – guitars, backing vocals; Jimmy Waldo – keyboards, synthesizers, keytar, piano, backing vocals; Gary Shea – bass, backing vocals; Jan Uvena – drums, percussion, backing vocals	Power Live (VHS) (1985); Disturbing the Peace Tour – Live in Japan 1984.10.10 (DVD Reissue) (2010); Disturbing the Peace (1985)
1985–1987	Graham Bonnet – lead vocals; Danny Johnson – guitars, backing vocals; Jimmy Waldo – keyboards, synthesizers, keytar, piano, backing vocals; Gary Shea – bass, backing vocals; Jan Uvena – drums, percussion, backing vocals	Dangerous Games (1986)
1987–2006 (Disbanded)
2006–2009 (Alcatrazz featuring Graham Bonnet)	Graham Bonnet – lead vocals; Howie Simon – guitars, backing vocals; Tim Luce – bass, backing vocals; Glen Sobel – drums, percussion, backing vocals	none
2009–2010 (Alcatrazz featuring Graham Bonnet)	Graham Bonnet – lead vocals; Howie Simon – guitars, backing vocals; Tim Luce – bass, backing vocals; Dave Dzialak – drums, percussion	none
2010–2011 (Alcatrazz featuring Graham Bonnet)	Graham Bonnet – lead vocals; Howie Simon – guitars, backing vocals; Tim Luce – bass, backing vocals; Jeff Bowders – drums, percussion	none
2011–2014 (Alcatrazz featuring Graham Bonnet)	Graham Bonnet – lead vocals; Howie Simon – guitars, backing vocals; Tim Luce – bass, backing vocals; Bobby Rock – drums, percussion, backing vocals	none
2014–2016 (Disbanded)
2017 (one-off show)	Graham Bonnet – lead vocals; Gary Shea – bass, backing vocals; Jimmy Waldo – keyboards, synthesizers, keytar, piano, backing vocals; with: Conrado Pesinato – guitars; Mark Benquechea – drums	Parole Denied – Tokyo 2017 (2018)
2017–2019 (Disbanded)
2019–2020	Graham Bonnet – lead vocals; Joe Stump – guitars; Jimmy Waldo – keyboards, synthesizers, keytar, piano, backing vocals; Beth-Ami Heavenstone – bass; Mark Benquechea – drums	none
2020	Graham Bonnet – lead vocals; Joe Stump – guitars; Jimmy Waldo – keyboards, synthesizers, keytar, piano, backing vocals; Gary Shea – bass, backing vocals; Mark Benquechea – drums	Born Innocent (2020)
2020–2021 (Waldo-Shea's Alcatrazz)	Doogie White – lead vocals; Joe Stump – guitars; Jimmy Waldo – keyboards, synthesizers, keytar, piano, backing vocals; Gary Shea – bass, backing vocals; Mark Benquechea – drums	V (2021)
2021–present (Waldo-Shea's Alcatrazz)	Doogie White – lead vocals; Joe Stump – guitars; Jimmy Waldo – keyboards, synthesizers, keytar, piano, backing vocals; Gary Shea – bass, backing vocals; Larry Paterson – drums	Take No Prisoners (2023)
2021–present (Graham Bonnet's Alcatrazz)	Graham Bonnet – lead vocals; Jeff Loomis – guitars	none

== Discography ==
=== Studio albums ===
Date	Title	Label	Chart positions
1983	No Parole from Rock 'n' Roll	Rocshire	Weeks on Chart: 18, Peak: No. 128
1985	Disturbing the Peace	Capitol	Weeks on Chart: 16, Peak: No. 145
1986	Dangerous Games	Capitol	
2020	Born Innocent	Silver Lining Music	
2021	V	Silver Lining Music	
2023	Take No Prisoners	Silver Lining Music	

=== Live albums ===
Date	Title	Label	Chart positions
1984	Live Sentence	Rocshire	Weeks on Chart: 10, Peak: No. 133
2010	Live '83	Deadline Music	
2010	No Parole from Rock 'n' Roll Tour Live in Japan 1984.1.28 Audio Tracks	Ward Records	
2010	Disturbing the Peace Tour Live in Japan 1984.10.10 Audio Tracks	Ward Records	
2018	Live in Japan 1984 – Complete Edition	Ear Music	
2018	Parole Denied – Tokyo 2017	Frontiers Records	

=== Compilations ===
Date	Title	Label	Chart positions
1998	The Best of Alcatrazz	Renaissance Records	－
2016	The Ultimate Fortress Rock Set (box)	Store For Music	－
2017	Breaking the Heart of the City: The Best of Alcatrazz (3CD-Boxset)	Cherry Red Records	－
2018	The Official Bootleg Boxset 1983–1986: Live, Demo, Rehearsals (6CD-Boxset)	Cherry Red Records	

=== Singles ===
Date	Title	Label	Album
1983	"Island in the Sun"	Rocshire	No Parole from Rock 'n' Roll
1985	"God Blessed Video"	Capitol	Disturbing the Peace

=== 12" Promotional Singles ===
Date	Title	Label	Album
1985	"Will You Be Home Tonight"	Capitol	Disturbing the Peace
1986	"Dangerous Games"	Capitol	Dangerous Games
1986	"It's My Life"	Capitol	Dangerous Games
1986	"Under Cover"	Capitol	Dangerous Games

=== Videos ===
- Metallic Live (VHS) (1984)
  - No Parole from Rock 'n' Roll Tour – Live in Japan 1984.1.28 (DVD Reissue) (2010)
- Power Live (VHS) (1985)
  - Disturbing the Peace Tour – Live in Japan 1984.10.10 (DVD Reissue) (2010)
