= Deutschland Tournee 1976 =

Live album by Rainbow
- Released: 24 May 2006
- Recorded: 1976
- Genre: Hard rock, heavy metal
- Length: 4:41:57
- Label: Virgin Japan

Rainbow live albums chronology
Live in Germany 1976 (1990)	Deutschland Tournee 1976 (2006)	Live in Munich 1977 (2006)

Deutschland Tournee 1976 is a 6-CD box-set released by the British hard rock band Rainbow in 2006, featuring live material from 3 concerts of the band's 1976 tour of West Germany, being Cologne on 25 September 1976, Düsseldorf on 27 September 1976, and Nürnberg on 28 September 1976. The complete set of 6 CDs was released only in Japan as a box-set. In Europe all three concerts would be released subsequently as separate double-CD sets, in jewel-cases, with the same track listings and CD timings.

"Over the Rainbow" was an introduction from the 1939 movie The Wizard of Oz that featured spoken line: "Toto, I've a feeling we're not in Kansas anymore. We must be over the rainbow!"

== Track listing ==
All songs written by Ritchie Blackmore and Ronnie James Dio, except where noted.

=== Cologne ===
Disc 1
No.	Title	Length
1.	"Over the Rainbow" (Harold Arlen, E.Y. Harburg)	1:20
2.	"Kill the King" (Ritchie Blackmore, Ronnie James Dio, Cozy Powell)	4:36
3.	"Mistreated" (Blackmore, David Coverdale)	15:03
4.	"Sixteenth Century Greensleeves"	8:15
5.	"Catch the Rainbow"	14:03
6.	"Man on the Silver Mountain"	12:49

Disc 2
No.	Title	Length
1.	"Stargazer"	16:56
2.	"Still I'm Sad" (Paul Samwell-Smith, Jim McCarty)	15:50
3.	"Do You Close Your Eyes"	11:17

=== Düsseldorf ===
Disc 3
No.	Title	Length
1.	"Over the Rainbow"	2:15
2.	"Kill the King"	4:48
3.	"Mistreated"	13:41
4.	"Sixteenth Century Greensleeves"	7:09
5.	"Catch the Rainbow"	14:35
6.	"Man on the Silver Mountain"	12:57

Disc 4
No.	Title	Length
1.	"Stargazer"	16:03
2.	"Still I'm Sad"	18:06

=== Nürnberg ===
Disc 5
No.	Title	Length
1.	"Over the Rainbow"	1:14
2.	"Kill the King"	4:46
3.	"Mistreated"	12:51
4.	"Sixteenth Century Greensleeves"	8:10
5.	"Catch the Rainbow"	13:21
6.	"Man on the Silver Mountain"	13:40

Disc 6
No.	Title	Length
1.	"Stargazer"	14:51
2.	"Still I'm Sad"	16:39
3.	"Do You Close Your Eyes"	6:43

== Personnel ==
- Ritchie Blackmore – guitars
- Ronnie James Dio – lead vocals
- Cozy Powell – drums, percussion
- Jimmy Bain – bass
- Tony Carey – keyboards
