= Rising (Rainbow album) =

- Cover painting by Ken Kelly

Studio album by Rainbow
- Released: 17 May 1976
- Recorded: February 1976
- Studios: Musicland, Munich, West Germany
- Genres: Heavy metal; hard rock
- Length: 33:28
- Label: Oyster/Polydor
- Producer: Martin Birch

Rainbow chronology
Ritchie Blackmore's Rainbow (1975)	Rising (1976)	Long Live Rock 'n' Roll (1978)

Singles from Rising
- 1. "Starstruck" / "Run with the Wolf" Released: 3 August 1976

Rising (also known as Rainbow Rising) is the second studio album by the British rock band Rainbow, released on 17 May 1976 by Oyster Records. The album features only six tracks, including two epic compositions exceeding eight minutes each on side two. Although the tracks from this album have been performed live rarely, if at all, "Stargazer" is widely regarded as a Rainbow classic and a landmark song in heavy metal music.

Following the release of Rainbow’s debut album, guitarist and bandleader Ritchie Blackmore dismissed all members except vocalist and lyricist Ronnie James Dio. He recruited veteran drummer Cozy Powell, with newcomers Jimmy Bain on bass and Tony Carey on keyboards. The new line-up began rehearsing and touring in late 1975, developing material through extended jam sessions before recording at Musicland Studios in West Germany with producer Martin Birch in February 1976. The recording sessions were swift and energised, capturing the band’s spontaneity and drive.

In June 1976, Rainbow launched a six-month world tour to support Rising. Internal tensions soon surfaced, leading to Bain and Carey’s dismissal at its conclusion.

The album was well received by critics, who praised Blackmore’s guitar work, Dio’s commanding vocals, and the group’s cohesion. Critics noted its heavy and complex music, with some declaring Rainbow to be the successor to Blackmore’s former band, Deep Purple. Commercially, Rising achieved moderate success but fell short of Blackmore’s ambitions in the United States, prompting him to pursue a more accessible sound in later years. Since the 1980s, the album has been recognised as a classic by critics and fans, a pivotal moment in heavy metal and a foundation for many of its sub-genres.

== Background ==
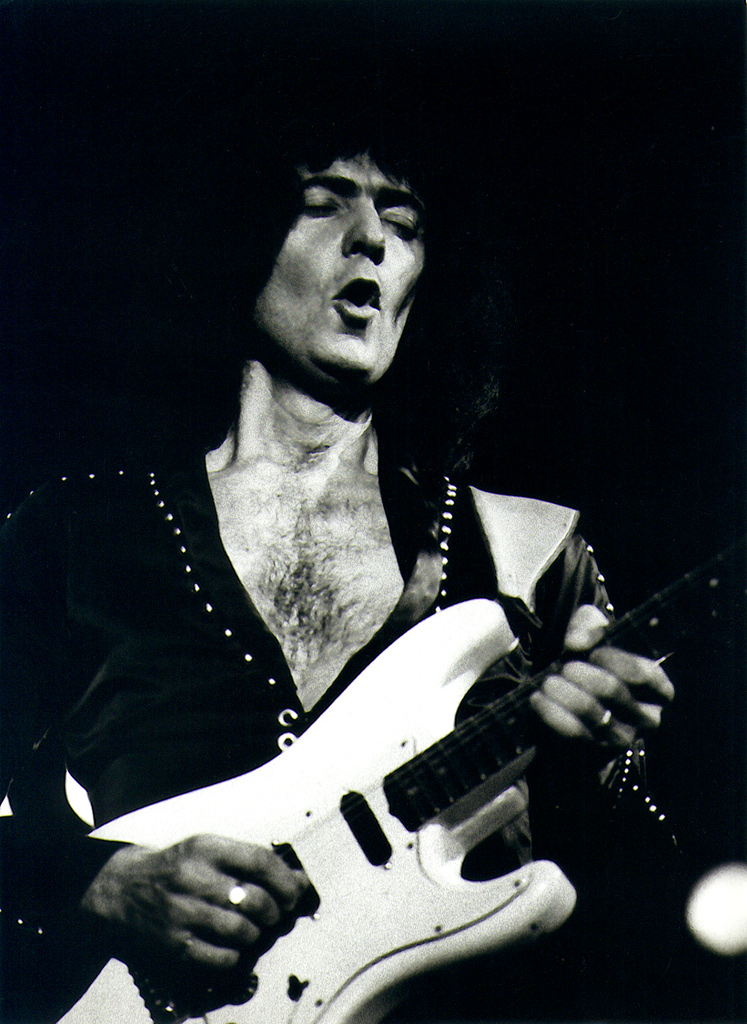
Guitarist Ritchie Blackmore officially left Deep Purple in June 1975 to pursue a solo project.

Rainbow’s debut album, Ritchie Blackmore's Rainbow, was released on 4 August 1975 to modest success, reaching No. 30 in the US and No. 11 in the UK. Reviewers praised aspects of the record but often criticised its lack of energy, comparing it with Stormbringer, Deep Purple’s then-most recent album, a work English band leader and guitarist Ritchie Blackmore despised for its funk and soul leanings.

Ritchie Blackmore's Rainbow featured guest vocals from Blackmore’s girlfriend, Shoshana Feinstein, although their relationship ended abruptly in May 1975. Distraught, Blackmore retreated to his new home in Hollywood, immersing himself in alcohol and parties. With his life increasingly based in California, it was natural for the band to relocate from New York City to Los Angeles to rehearse for their upcoming tour. Management booked a rehearsal space at Pirate Sound Studios in Los Angeles, but Blackmore soon grew dissatisfied with the musicians, members of Ronnie James Dio’s former band Elf, criticising their sound and stage presence. Dio alone earned his full respect, thanks to his vocal power, creativity, and shared interests in classical music, medieval lore, and the occult.

Bassist Craig Gruber was the first to be sacked, quickly replaced by Jimmy Bain of the unsigned Scottish band Harlot, whom Blackmore and Dio had seen performing at The Marquee in London. Soon after Bain's arrival, drummer Gary Driscoll was dismissed and keyboardist Mickey Lee Soule departed voluntarily. Dio, though regretful about the purge of his former bandmates, accepted its necessity and assisted in recruiting replacements. Auditions in Los Angeles took the form of extended jam sessions designed to test stamina and chemistry with Blackmore. The English drummer Cozy Powell, who was the last of many to audition, proved exceptional and was immediately hired. Renowned for his work with the Jeff Beck Group and Bedlam, as well as two UK hit singles, Powell had been considering a career shift to professional motorbike racing in Europe when Blackmore called. Despite clashes, his forceful personality and a similar sense of humour allowed him to coexist with the mercurial guitarist for five years. Several keyboardists were considered, including Eddie Jobson of Curved Air and Roxy Music, but the spot ultimately went to the young American Tony Carey. Bain had discovered him in a nearby studio, and during his audition, Carey impressed everyone by trading note for note with Blackmore, earning an immediate place in the band.

With the lineup complete, Rainbow returned to Pirate Sound to rehearse and write new material. In the same facility, Deep Purple were preparing their US tour with new guitarist Tommy Bolin, forcing the manager to schedule sessions carefully to avoid Blackmore meeting his former bandmates. Visitors included members of Bad Company, as well as Robert Plant and John Bonham of Led Zeppelin, who occasionally joined the jams. Rainbow made their live debut on 10 November 1975 in Montreal, Canada, followed by a 20-date US tour featuring songs from their debut and new compositions "Do You Close Your Eyes", "Stargazer", and "A Light in the Black". On stage, the centrepiece was a vast, 40-foot illuminated rainbow, powered by 3,000 lightbulbs. Although visually striking, it frequently interfered with the guitars and amplifiers, causing disruptions.

== Writing, composition and style ==
I like themes. I like music that is direct, dramatic music. That's why I like Bach. He's my favorite composer. Pachelbel, and people like Buxtehude, Telemann, they're all German composers, very direct. They're dramatic, no-nonsense.

— Ritchie Blackmore (1975)

Blackmore and Dio began collaborating when Elf supported Deep Purple on the Stormbringer tour. Blackmore found the partnership "refreshing" and natural, as both shared an interest in classical and folk music. Dio could seamlessly weave his vocal melodies and lyrics into Blackmore’s riffs, some of which originated in the guitarist’s live improvisations with Deep Purple. They wrote all the material for Rainbow’s debut, presenting the finished songs to the other Elf members only at the recording stage. The guitarist's original intention for the music of Rainbow was "to carry on and expand upon the essence of Deep Purple – aggressiveness – and at the same time add a kind of medieval feel to it."

For Rainbow’s second album, Blackmore’s mood and listening habits deeply shaped the music. During his California retreat, he immersed himself in classical and medieval works and even learnt cello from his friend Hugh McDowell of the Electric Light Orchestra, an instrument he felt mirrored his lonely, melancholic state. Blackmore was also stung by critics who claimed the debut lacked intensity and set out to prove himself to the press and his former bandmates.

When rehearsals with the new lineup began in September 1975, Blackmore and Dio already had ideas, but unlike the debut, they encouraged the musicians to improvise in extended jam sessions. This freer process birthed the album’s centerpiece, the "Kashmir"-inspired "Stargazer". Originating from a cello riff by Blackmore and expanded with Dio’s vocal melody, the track evolved into a sprawling arrangement featuring Arabic scales and an extended slide guitar solo. Despite the contributions of all the musicians involved, official credit for all the album's songs remained with Blackmore and Dio alone. In December 1975, Rainbow relocated for two weeks to a farmhouse in Fürstenfeldbruck near Munich, West Germany to develop more material. Working with minimal equipment, they relied again on jams sparked by riffs or phrases, while Dio withdrew to craft lyrics. These sessions not only produced the songs for Rising, but also "Kill the King", which Rainbow played as the opener of their live shows in the 1976 tour, and "Long Live Rock ’n’ Roll". Both songs were recorded in the studio for the following album Long Live Rock 'n' Roll of 1978.

Dio penned all the lyrics, indulging his fascination with fantasy and history. "Tarot Woman", at Blackmore’s request, depicts a fortune-teller; "Run with the Wolf" explores werewolf lore; while "Stargazer" and "A Light in the Black" form an epic tale about the downfall of a wizard and the liberation of his slaves in ancient Egypt. More grounded tracks included the love song "Do You Close Your Eyes" and "Starstruck", which depicts a persistent female fan stalking Blackmore.

Rising features no ballads, instead offering fast, heavy tracks, powered by Powell's drumming, Carey's sweeping keyboards, and Dio's "ferocious" vocal delivery. Critics praised Blackmore’s guitar work as some of his finest, noting how successfully he fused classical influences with hard rock in a band that was both dynamic and cohesive. Carey later called this lineup a "hard rock progressive blues band" and reviewers described the sound as spanning hard rock to early heavy metal. Ian Christe in his book Sound of the Beast listed Rainbow among the proto-metal pioneers who shaped the next generation of musicians, while other critics highlight Rising as a blueprint for the power metal subgenre, with its rapid tempos, classical flourishes and mythic themes.

== Recording and production ==
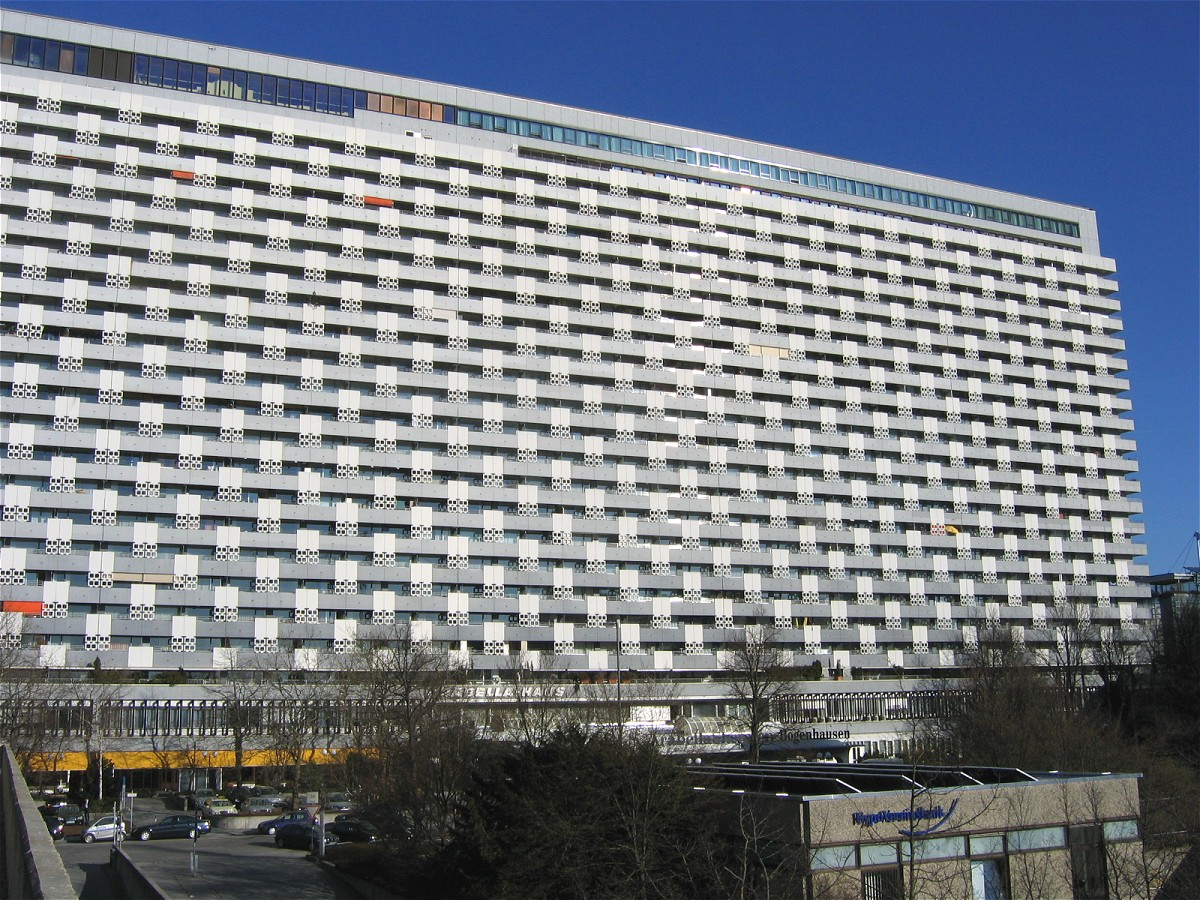
Musicland Studios was located in the basement of the Arabella-Hochhaus. The band stayed in the hotel upper floors for the recording sessions.

Rainbow continued rehearsing their material at a disused local club, while the facilities chosen to record the new album at Musicland Studios in Munich, West Germany were still unavailable. The studio was owned by the Italian songwriter and musician Giorgio Moroder and Blackmore knew it well, having recorded Stormbringer there with Deep Purple, as well as the first Rainbow album. Four months earlier, Deep Purple had recorded Come Taste the Band in the same studio and in January 1976 Ian Gillan was completing there the recordings of Child in Time with his new band. The studio was located in the first basement of a tall hotel building made of concrete walls, which were very good for acoustics and very easy to adapt to specific needs. In fact, Powell's drum kit was assembled in a special concrete and tile alcove created by tearing down a wall in a storeroom to achieve a more direct and powerful sound. This was done to avoid the muffled drum sound typical of the then-current pop and rock recordings, caused by the rugged walls of other popular studios.

The recording of Rising eventually started in February 1976. The English producer and sound engineer Martin Birch was in charge of the recording sessions, assisted by the German resident engineer at Musicland Reinhold Mack. Birch had been associated with Blackmore since Deep Purple's live album Made in Japan of 1972. According to Carey, Birch worked as the main engineer and acted as mediator between the band members' strong personalities, but the actual producer was Blackmore, who chose the sounds, the cuts and the recordings to keep or discard. Birch preferred to use mostly the Rolling Stones Mobile Studio's new 24-track recorder to engineer the tracks, instead of Musicland's 16-track equipment.

As a result of the extensive preparation, the drums, bass, guitar and some of the keyboards tracks were recorded separately in less than ten days in one or two takes. This fact explains why no alternate or demo versions exist, only the original or rough mixes taken during rehearsals. In contrast with what happened for the recording sessions of the first album, this time Blackmore gave the musicians freedom to improvise intros, fills and solos, a gesture which Bain, Carey and Powell appreciated.

Rainbow – "Stargazer" (1976)
The addition of the orchestra to the last section of the song created some problems, as Blackmore recalled: “The orchestra was too flowery, and there was too much detracting from the simple melody, we kept taking out parts… and mixed in some Mellotron to even out the orchestra not sounding cohesive or in tune.”

Blackmore and Carey later overdubbed their solos and the rest of the keyboards on the instrumental basic tracks. Carey improvised the keyboard intro for "Tarot Woman" on a Minimoog while in solitude in the studio and, after many hours of attempts to perfect it, the very first spontaneous version was chosen. He recorded also a keyboard intro for "Stargazer", which was discarded in favour of the drum intro that appears on record. (Note: A take of that discarded keyboard intro can be found on the 2011 Deluxe Edition's "Rough Mix" section.) Carey also recorded a complete orchestral track for "Stargazer", using a Vako Orchestron keyboard. Dio's vocal performance was the last part to be recorded and took more time than the others, requiring multiple takes to perfect.

Despite Blackmore's reluctance to work with a live orchestra after his past experiences with Deep Purple, it was decided to add strings and horns to the song "Stargazer". Twenty-eight members of the Munich Philharmonic Orchestra, previously available for other recordings at Musicland Studios, were hired to provide the classical instrumentation for the song’s final section. The orchestra had a simple score, which was recorded when most of the band members had already returned to the US and then mixed with the keyboard track left by Carey. A violin solo was also performed during those sessions, but it was not recorded and was lost.

Birch mixed the album at Musicland and wrapped up the recording sessions after about three weeks. Bain recalled in his last interview that the original mix was well balanced and bass-heavy, but the record label was not satisfied with it. Consequently, Blackmore and Dio were called to New York City to change it and cut the lower frequencies before handing it to the mastering engineer. This mix was used for all the vinyl releases and is known as the New York Mix.

== Artwork and packaging ==
Ritchie Blackmore had quite a clear idea in his mind of the cover of Rainbow's second album. He said that "the artwork was reflective of the audiences we played to [...] they liked to raise their fists in the air." The artist chosen for the job was the American Ken Kelly, undertaking his second assignment in the music business. Kelly had worked for a few years on the covers of fantasy and horror magazines and books when he was contacted to paint the cover for the album Destroyer by Kiss, which sold millions of copies and made the painter suddenly famous and much more sought after as an artist. Kelly met Blackmore at the guitarist's office in Los Angeles to discuss the cover art. Describing the meeting, Kelly recalled that Blackmore "knew exactly what he wanted", down to the details of the tiny eyes of an owl. Having so many indications, Kelly quickly sketched in pencil a few drafts of the cover and the band chose its favourite, suggesting minor additions. He then painted it and delivered the finished work in a very short time, in what he called "a very smooth and simple transaction".

The original vinyl release was a gatefold sleeve, containing a large black-and-white photograph of the band shot by Fin Costello, who also oversaw the art design. Just like producer Martin Birch, Costello had been associated with Blackmore's work since Made in Japan in 1972. Costello's shots of the musicians playing live on stage appear on the back cover. The lyrics of "Stargazer" were the only ones printed inside, echoing the sleeve of the first Rainbow album, where only the lyrics of "Sixteenth Century Greensleeves" were included.

== Releases and commercial reception ==
The German edition of the single "Starstruck" by Blackmore's Rainbow.

The album was released on 17 May 1976 on the Oyster label, a subsidiary of Purple Records inaugurated by Ritchie Blackmore's Rainbow the year before, and was distributed worldwide by Polydor Records. The original vinyl release of Rising comprised four mid-to-fast tempo rock songs on side one and two extended compositions exceeding eight minutes on side two. The album title Rainbow Rising was derived from the lyrics of the song "Stargazer" and, with the band presented as Blackmore’s Rainbow, it appeared on all labels and advertisements as the album’s official name. This remained consistent until the remastered edition of the late 1990s, which shortened the album title to Rising and altered the band’s logo to Rainbow, likely to align it with the other releases in the series.

Rising was not a huge commercial success; it did not enter the Top Ten of any chart worldwide, peaking at No. 48 on the US Billboard Top LPs & Tape chart and at No. 11 in the UK. Nevertheless, it proved to be a long-seller and was certified gold for selling 100,000 copies in the UK in 1979, with the Deluxe Edition being certified Silver in 2013. It also achieved gold status in Australia and Japan.

The only single extracted from the album was "Starstruck" with "Run with the Wolf" on the B-side. It was released in Europe on 3 August 1976, but failed to chart.

The album was reissued multiple times on vinyl during the 1980s and first released on CD in 1986, with a different mix from the previous editions. The so-called Los Angeles Mix had bass frequencies restored and included a few slight differences, such as a longer delay before the band entered after Carey's opening solo in "Tarot Woman". The 1999 remastered CD editions used the original vinyl mix again. A limited-edition deluxe version of the album was released in Japan on 5 April 2011 as a 2 SHM-CD (Super High Material CD) Deluxe Remastered Edition. This reissue was released in a cardboard gatefold sleeve and was part of a two-album Rainbow reissue series featuring Rising and Down to Earth. The European edition was released the same year in digipack with two regular CDs. This edition contains both the New York and Los Angeles mixes on disc one, recordings taken from the rehearsals at Pirate Sound and outtakes from the recording sessions at Musicland on disc two.

== Touring ==
The band embarked on a world tour on 11 June 1976, beginning in the US and then moving to Europe, Australia and Japan, generally performing in mid-sized arenas. Some of the problems with the digitally-controlled rainbow backdrop which had plagued the previous tour had been resolved and Blackmore had a new white Fender Stratocaster, specially built with components that did not interfere with the lighting gear. In the days leading up to the tour, tensions between Blackmore and Carey mounted as the keyboard player's behaviour, both on and off the stage, increasingly irritated Blackmore. Rainbow's manager Bruce Payne contacted Vanilla Fudge's Mark Stein and the Italian keyboard player Joe Vescovi to replace Carey, but nothing came of it and he remained in the band.

Few of the album tracks made it into the band's live set: "Stargazer" featured in all the 1976 shows and "Do You Close Your Eyes" was the encore song, but the physically demanding "A Light in the Black" was dropped early in the 1976 tour, although it was reintroduced into the set at a couple of Japanese dates. "Starstruck" was played in shortened form, usually in a medley with "Man on the Silver Mountain". The band added Deep Purple's "Mistreated" to their setlist, and song lengths were extended to include improvisations and long solos. Despite receiving very good reviews, the first leg of the tour was expensive and difficult and a few gigs in the US had to be cancelled because Phil Lynott, leader of the co-headlining band Thin Lizzy, was hospitalised with hepatitis. To cut costs as headliners, Rainbow opened for Jethro Tull, Heart and Blue Öyster Cult in a few different dates in the US. The band moved to the UK in August 1976 for a series of acclaimed and mostly sold-out shows, supported by Stretch. During a gig at Newcastle City Hall, Blackmore ostentatiously fired Carey while on stage but, to his dismay, he was forced to reinstate him because no replacement was available for the rest of the tour. The following European dates had the up-and-coming Australian band AC/DC as support group. Japan received Rainbow as superstars in the last leg of the tour, culminating in two shows at the Nippon Budokan in Tokyo on 16 December 1976. Blackmore was also given an award for being voted the most popular guitarist in a Japanese music magazine. Despite the tour being far from perfect, the band had some especially well received performances in Germany and Japan, some of which were recorded for the live album On Stage released in 1977. Blackmore fired Bain after the end of the tour in January 1977, officially for his difficulty to play complex bass parts. He also finalised the dismissal of Carey and invited Vescovi, whom he had met through his old acquaintance Arvid Andersen, to replace him. Eventually, Carey was recalled a few months later for the recording of Long Live Rock 'n' Roll in France.

"Stargazer" was dropped from the setlist after the 1976 tour and was performed at least once in the 1980s, returning in a Rainbow show only in 2016. "Starstruck" in its reduced form and "Do You Close Your Eyes" appeared in the 1977 world tour setlist, but were completely abandoned in the following years. After he left Black Sabbath in 1982, Ronnie James Dio performed songs from the first three Rainbow albums with his band Dio, which for many years featured Jimmy Bain both as songwriter and bass player. Among the songs included in their live sets were "Tarot Woman", "Starstruck" and "Stargazer".

== Critical reception ==
Professional ratings
Review scores
Source	Rating
AllMusic	4/5 stars
Collector's Guide to Heavy Metal	9/10
The Encyclopedia of Popular Music	4/5 stars
The Rolling Stone Record Guide	1/5 stars
Sounds	4/5 stars
Sputnikmusic	5/5

Contemporary reviews were generally positive. New Musical Express reviewer Bob Edmands wrote that "with one album, Blackmore has transcended anything he did with Deep Purple" and that the combination of him and Cozy Powell produced the "hottest heavy in years" with a "fat, powerful and brutish" sound. Geoff Barton writing for the British magazine Sounds praised the consistency of the new line-up and the album, whose content he described as "hard rocking, exciting music with an underlying medieval influence." David Brown of Record Mirror appreciated the "good hard rock" of the album and thought Rainbow ready to take the place of the waning Deep Purple. On the other hand, Rolling Stone reviewer Robert Duncan described the music on Rising as "disjointed, grandiose and humorless" and Dio's lyrics dark, apocalyptic and gothic, concluding that "Blackmore's guitar soloing has always been the saving grace of his compositions", but this album is too "gloomily banal" for his playing to shine.

Modern reviewers have acclaimed Rising as a classic album, fundamental for the development of heavy metal sub-genres and for influencing the next generation of metal musicians. AllMusic wrote that on Rising "Blackmore and Dio [were] at the peak of their creative powers", put the album on a par with "classic Deep Purple" and remarked on the great progress the band had made from their debut. Canadian journalist Martin Popoff praised the album, calling it "a near masterpiece of medieval metal" and “the largest guitar rock record from either Deep Purple or Rainbow since In Rock". Sputnikmusic reflected on the "huge influence" that Rising had on the '90s European power metal bands and concluded that "the album could have been longer but the combination of emotion, power and the qualities that each member brought to the band make Rising a monument of hard rock".

== Legacy ==
Bain, Carey and Powell considered the album a major achievement and one of their best works. By contrast, Dio was not happy with Rising and called it "amateurish" and self-indulgent, lamenting years later the dominance of the guitars and drums in the sound of the album. In one of his interviews, Blackmore rated Rising as his favourite Rainbow album and "Stargazer" one of his greatest musical accomplishments, but was not fully satisfied with the excessively high-pitched final mix. He was also disappointed with the commercial results and the limited radio play in the US, which he attributed to the album being too heavy. Consequently, he pressed for Rainbow’s next releases to feature more commercially viable songs.

Musicians and fans have held Rising in high esteem since its release. Former Deep Purple bass player Roger Glover was persuaded to join Rainbow by listening to "Stargazer", which he recognised as something new in rock music. Iron Maiden singer Bruce Dickinson cited Rising as a very influential album on which he discovered Dio's voice. Musicians Rob Halford of Judas Priest and Snowy Shaw have paid tribute to the album in recent years, with Shaw describing it as "a masterpiece and pretty much a milestone" and saying that it "introduced a more Dungeons and Dragons type fantasy heavy rock to the masses". Dutch musician and producer Arjen Lucassen attended one of Rainbow’s European dates in 1976 and has expressed a fondness for their epic music, particularly the song "Stargazer".

A fan poll for "The Greatest Heavy Metal Album of All Time" published in issue No. 4 of the British magazine Kerrang!, cover-dated October 1981, placed Rising at number one. In 2021, 45 years after the album release, a fan poll for the "Top 500 Heavy Metal Albums of All Time" placed Rising at No. 39. Another survey among metal fans in 2018 ranked the song "Stargazer" at No. 4 among The Top 250 Heavy Metal Songs of the '70s.

=== Notable cover versions ===
- In 1998, "Stargazer" was featured in the tribute album Cozy Powell Forever, produced and performed by Japanese metal musicians.
- Italian power metal band Domine covered the song "Stargazer" and released it as a Japanese bonus track on their 2001 album Stormbringer Ruler.
- Adrián Barilari, singer of Rata Blanca, performed a version of "Stargazer" (titled "Astrónomo") in Spanish on his album Barilari released in 2003. He also sang an English version of the song on a following live album.
- Chicago metal band Bible of the Devil covered the song "Starstruck" on a 2004 split EP with The Last Vegas.
- Dream Theater covered the song "Stargazer" on the album Black Clouds & Silver Linings (2009).
- Faroese folk metal band Týr covered the song "Stargazer" as well on their album The Lay of Thrym (2011).
- The 2014 tribute album to Ronnie James Dio This Is Your Life featured covers of "Starstruck" by Motörhead and Biff Byford and a medley by Metallica called "Ronnie Rising Medley" of the songs: "A Light in the Black", "Tarot Woman", "Stargazer" and "Kill the King".

=== Accolades ===
Publication	Country	Accolade	Year	Rank
Kerrang!	United Kingdom	"Greatest Heavy Metal Albums of All Time"	1981	1
Kerrang!	United Kingdom	"100 Greatest Heavy Metal Albums of All Time"	1989	14
Sound of the Beast	United States	"The Best 25 Heavy Metal Albums of All Time"	2003	–
Q	United Kingdom	"The 30 Greatest Classic Rock Albums Ever"	2004	–
Kerrang!	United Kingdom	"100 Best British Rock Albums Ever"	2005	74
Classic Rock	United Kingdom	"100 Greatest British Rock Album Ever"	2006	18
Rolling Stone	United States	"100 Greatest Metal Albums of All Time"	2017	48
Classic Rock	United Kingdom	"100 Greatest Rock Albums of All Time"	2017	21

== Track listings ==
All credits adapted from the original releases.

All lyrics are written by Ronnie James Dio; all music is composed by Ritchie Blackmore and Dio.

Side one
No.	Title	Length
1.	"Tarot Woman"	5:58
2.	"Run with the Wolf"	3:48
3.	"Starstruck"	4:06
4.	"Do You Close Your Eyes"	2:58

Side two
No.	Title	Length
5.	"Stargazer"	8:26
6.	"A Light in the Black"	8:12

=== 2011 Deluxe Edition ===
Disc one – New York Mix
No.	Title	Length
1.	"Tarot Woman"	6:01
2.	"Run with the Wolf"	3:41
3.	"Starstruck"	4:06
4.	"Do You Close Your Eyes"	3:00
5.	"Stargazer"	8:26
6.	"A Light in the Black"	8:12

Disc one – Los Angeles Mix
No.	Title	Length
7.	"Tarot Woman"	6:05
8.	"Run with the Wolf"	3:45
9.	"Starstruck"	4:05
10.	"Do You Close Your Eyes"	2:58
11.	"Stargazer"	8:22
12.	"A Light in the Black"	8:11

Disc two – Rough Mix
No.	Title	Length
1.	"Tarot Woman"	6:06
2.	"Run with the Wolf"	3:49
3.	"Starstruck"	4:04
4.	"Do You Close Your Eyes"	3:04
5.	"Stargazer" (with keyboard intro)	9:08
6.	"A Light in the Black"	8:12
7.	"Stargazer" (Pirate Sound tour rehearsal)	8:34
8.	"A Light in the Black" (Pirate Sound tour rehearsals)
9.	"Man on the Silver Mountain" (Pirate Sound tour rehearsals)

== Personnel ==
Rainbow

- Ronnie James Dio – vocals
- Ritchie Blackmore – guitar
- Tony Carey – keyboards
- Jimmy Bain – bass
- Cozy Powell – drums

Additional musicians

- Munich Philharmonic Orchestra – strings, horn
- Fritz Sonnleitner – concert master
- Rainer Pietsch – conductor

Production

- Produced and mixed by Martin Birch

== Charts ==
Chart (1976)	Peak position
Australian Albums (Kent Music Report)	33
Canada Top Albums/CDs (RPM)	17
German Albums (Offizielle Top 100)	38
Japanese Albums (Oricon)	12
New Zealand Albums (RMNZ)	36
Swedish Albums (Sverigetopplistan)	23
UK Albums (OCC)	11
US Billboard 200	48

Chart (2011)	Peak position
Oricon Japanese Albums Charts	67
UK Rock & Metal Albums (Official Charts)	7

Chart (2025)	Peak position
Greek Albums (IFPI)	39

== Certifications ==
Region	Certification	Certified units/sales
Australia (ARIA)	Gold	20,000^{^}
France (SNEP)	Gold	100,000^{*}
Japan (RIAJ)	Gold	100,000^{^}
United Kingdom (BPI)	Gold	100,000^{^}
United Kingdom (BPI) Deluxe Edition 2011	Silver	60,000^{*}
^{*} Sales figures based on certification alone.^{^} Shipments figures based on certification alone.

== Bibliography ==
- Bloom, Jerry (2006). Black Knight – Ritchie Blackmore. London, UK: Music Sales Group. ISBN 978-1-84609-266-4.
- Makowski, Pete (June 2011). "The Light Fantastic". Classic Rock. No. 158. pp. 66–70, 126.
- Popoff, Martin (2019). Sensitive to Light: The Rainbow Story. Bedford, England: Wymer Publishing. ISBN 978-1-91278-240-6.
- Thompson, Dave (August 2004). Smoke on the Water: The Deep Purple Story. Toronto, Canada: ECW Press. ISBN 978-1-55022-618-8.
