= Tomorrow Blue =

Studio album by Toad
- Released: 1972 (Europe); 1973 (UK)
- Studio: De Lane Lea Studios
- Genre: Heavy metal; hard rock; blues rock
- Label: Hallelujah (Switzerland); Polydor (UK)
- Producer: Chris Schwegler

Toad chronology
Toad (1971)	Tomorrow Blue (1972)	Open Fire: Live in Basel 1972 (1973)

Tomorrow Blue is the second album by the Swiss rock band Toad, released in 1972. It was engineered by British producer Martin Birch, as was their first album. Musically, their songs take over a more blues mood on this album, although they did not totally abandon the hard rock/prog rock sound they previously had. The three band members brought in Helmut Lipsky to play violin, but did not use an outside singer, unlike their first album.

== Track listing ==
1. "Thoughts" (Vergeat/Fröhlich) – 6:29
2. "Tomorrow Blue" (Vergeat/Fröhlich) – 9:05
3. "Blind Chapmans Tale" (Vergeat) – 5:22
4. "Vampires" (Vergeat/Fröhlich) – 5:42
5. "No Need" (Vergeat/Fröhlich) – 3:39
6. "Change in Time" (Vergeat/Fröhlich) – 12:25
7. "Three O' Clock in the Morning" (Vergeat) – 0:47

CD extra tracks

1. "Fly" (Vergeat/Fröhlich/Wenger) – 6:51
2. "I Saw Her Standing There" (Lennon/McCartney) – 3:27
3. "Green Ham" (Vergeat) – 3:58

== Personnel ==
Toad

- Vic Vergeat – Guitar, Vocals
- Werner Fröhlich – Bass, Vocals
- Cosimo Lampis – Drums

Additional personnel

- Helmut Lipsky – Violin
- Giorgio Meloni – Liner Notes
- Silvio Caduff – Artwork
- Produced by Chris Schwegler
- Engineered by Martin Birch
