= Martin Birch =

British record producer (1948–2020)

Background information
- Born: 27 December 1948; Woking, Surrey, England
- Died: 9 August 2020 (aged 71)
- Genres: Rock; hard rock; heavy metal
- Occupations: Record producer; audio engineer
- Years active: 1968–1992

Martin Peter Birch (27 December 1948 – 9 August 2020) was a British music producer and sound engineer. He became renowned for engineering and producing albums recorded predominantly by British rock and metal bands, including Deep Purple, Rainbow, Fleetwood Mac, Whitesnake, Black Sabbath, and Iron Maiden.

== Biography ==
Birch was born on 27 December 1948 in Woking, Surrey. He began his career in music as an audio engineer with Jeff Beck, Fleetwood Mac and Deep Purple, producing and engineering eleven albums for the latter. In 1980, coming from the "Deep Purple camp", he was called upon by Black Sabbath for Heaven and Hell. The band's previous albums had been self-produced and they were happy to let Birch, who had worked with Ronnie James Dio before, produce them. His "bright midrange" on the album is especially noted. He began a long tenure working exclusively with Iron Maiden in 1981, producing and engineering Killers and retiring from working with other bands for a while.

Birch also produced and engineered albums for numerous artists. These included Deep Purple-related projects (Rainbow, Paice Ashton Lord, Whitesnake, Roger Glover, and Jon Lord), but also encompassed Wayne County & the Electric Chairs. On Fleetwood Mac's album Mystery to Me (1973) he is also credited playing acoustic guitar. The song "Hard Lovin' Man" from the Deep Purple album Deep Purple in Rock is dedicated to him: "For Martin Birch – catalyst".

Birch retired in 1992, after producing Iron Maiden's Fear of the Dark album. It was the last of the ten records he produced with the group. He appeared in Iron Maiden's music video "Holy Smoke" two years before his retirement. Birch died on 9 August 2020, at age 71. The cause of death was undisclosed. Initial tributes were paid by David Coverdale and Geezer Butler. Members of Iron Maiden offered a lengthy tribute to Birch on their official website, with Steve Harris, Bruce Dickinson and Rod Smallwood reflecting on his personality and his time working with the band.

== Selected discography ==
Source: AllMusic unless otherwise stated.

=== Fleetwood Mac ===
- 1969 – Then Play On (engineer)
- 1970 – Kiln House (engineer)
- 1972 – Bare Trees (engineer)
- 1973 – Penguin (producer, engineer, mixing)
- 1973 – Mystery to Me (producer, engineer, guitar)

=== Deep Purple ===
- 1969 – Concerto for Group and Orchestra (engineer)
- 1970 – Deep Purple in Rock (engineer)
- 1971 – Fireball (engineer)
- 1972 – Machine Head (engineer)
- 1972 – Made in Japan (engineer)
- 1973 – Who Do We Think We Are (engineer)
- 1974 – Burn (engineer, mixing)
- 1974 – Stormbringer (co-producer, engineer, mixing)
- 1975 – Come Taste the Band (co-producer, engineer, mixing)
- 1976 – Made In Europe (producer, engineer, mixing) – recorded live in April 1975
- 1977 – Last Concert in Japan (co-producer, engineer) – recorded live in December 1975

=== Jon Lord ===
- 1971 – Gemini Suite (engineer)
- 1976 – Sarabande (producer, engineer, remixing)

=== Bernie Marsden ===
- 1979 – And About Time Too (producer, engineer)

=== Wishbone Ash ===
- 1970 – Wishbone Ash (engineer)
- 1971 – Pilgrimage (engineer)
- 1972 – Argus (engineer)

=== Rainbow ===
- 1975 – Ritchie Blackmore's Rainbow (co-producer, engineer, mixing)
- 1976 – Rising (producer, engineer, mixing)
- 1977 – On Stage (producer, engineer, mixing) – recorded live in 1976
- 1978 – Long Live Rock 'n' Roll (producer, engineer, mixing)
- 1986 – Finyl Vinyl (producer) – collection

=== Whitesnake ===
- 1978 – Snakebite (producer)
- 1978 – Trouble (producer)
- 1979 – Lovehunter (producer)
- 1980 – Ready an' Willing (producer, engineer, mixing)
- 1980 – Live... in the Heart of the City (producer, engineer) – recorded live in 1978 and 1980
- 1981 – Come an' Get It (producer, engineer, mixing)
- 1982 – Saints & Sinners (producer, engineer, mixing)
- 1984 – Slide It In (producer)

=== Black Sabbath ===
- 1980 – Heaven and Hell (producer, engineer)
- 1981 – Mob Rules (producer, engineer)

=== Blue Öyster Cult ===
- 1980 – Cultösaurus Erectus (producer, engineer)
- 1981 – Fire of Unknown Origin (producer, engineer)

=== Iron Maiden ===
- 1981 – Killers (producer, engineer)
- 1982 – The Number of the Beast (producer, engineer)
- 1983 – Piece of Mind (producer, engineer, mixing)
- 1984 – Powerslave (producer, engineer, mixing)
- 1985 – Live After Death (producer, engineer, mixing)
- 1986 – Somewhere in Time (producer, engineer, mixing)
- 1988 – Seventh Son of a Seventh Son (producer, engineer, mixing)
- 1989 – Maiden England (producer, engineer, mixing)
- 1990 – No Prayer for the Dying (producer, engineer, mixing)
- 1992 – Fear of the Dark (producer, engineer, mixing)

=== Other artists ===
- 1969 – Jeff Beck – Beck-Ola (engineer)
- 1970 – Peter Green – The End of the Game (engineer)
- 1970 – The Groundhogs – Thank Christ for the Bomb (engineer)
- 1971 – Stackridge – Stackridge (engineer)
- 1971 – Canned Heat and John Lee Hooker – Hooker 'N' Heat (Mixdown Engineer) – recorded in 1970
- 1971 – Skid Row – 34 Hours (engineer)
- 1971 – Toad – Toad (engineer)
- 1971 – Faces – Long Player (engineer)
- 1972 – Silverhead – Silverhead (producer)
- 1972 – Toad – Tomorrow Blue (engineer)
- 1972 – Flash – Flash (engineer)
- 1972 – Nick Pickett – Silversleeves (engineer)
- 1973 – Gary Moore – Grinding Stone (producer, engineer)
- 1978 – Wayne County & the Electric Chairs – Storm The Gates Of Heaven (producer)
- 1978 – Roger Glover – Elements (producer)
- 1979 – Cozy Powell – Over the Top (producer)
- 1982 – Michael Schenker Group – Assault Attack (producer, engineer)
