= Live in Munich 1977 =

2006 live album by the band Rainbow

Live album by Rainbow
- Released: 13 June 2006
- Recorded: Olympiahalle, Munich, West Germany, 20 October 1977
- Genre: Hard rock, heavy metal
- Length: 98:36
- Label: Eagle
- Producer: Drew Thompson, Terry Shand, Geoff Kempin

Rainbow live albums chronology
Deutschland Tournee 1976 (2006)	Live in Munich 1977 (2006)	Black Masquerade (2013)

Live in Munich 1977

Video by Rainbow
- Released: 22 August 2006
- Recorded: Olympiahalle, Munich, West Germany, 20 October 1977
- Genre: Hard rock, heavy metal
- Length: 146 mins
- Label: Eagle Vision
- Producer: Drew Thompson, Terry Shand, Geoff Kempin

Rainbow chronology
The Final Cut (1985)	Live in Munich 1977 (2006)	Black Masquerade (2013)

Professional ratings
Review scores
Source	Rating
AllMusic	4.5/5 stars
Blogcritics	(favorable)
DVD Verdict	(very favorable)
DVD Talk	(Recommended)
Teraz Rock	(favorable)

Live in Munich 1977 is a live album and DVD released by the British hard rock band Rainbow in 2006.

The concert was recorded in Munich on 20 October 1977, originally filmed to air on the West German Rockpalast TV show. Repeated airings have led to numerous bootleg video and audio tapes of the show being available through the 1980s and '90s. The set is not from the same tour that produced the previously released live album On Stage (which was mostly culled from their 1976 Japanese tour), but from their 1977 European tour, a few months prior to the release of Long Live Rock 'n' Roll, with a different keyboardist and bassist.

The DVD release also features the three promotional videos for Rainbow's Long Live Rock 'n' Roll album, and interviews with Bob Daisley and former tour manager Colin Hart.

On 26 April 2010 a double 180 gram limited edition gatefold vinyl reissue of the album was released through Just For Kicks Music (Germany).

On 6 May 2013 the CD and DVD were reissued by Eagle Rock and Eagle Vision respectively. The only difference being the addition of 'Rainbow Over Texas '76', a short 13-minute feature, to the DVD, and revised track timings to the CD tracks. Many of the titles on the original 2006 issue CD were edited, cutting almost 15 minutes from the total length of the concert; the 2013 issue restores these edits, making the total running time closer to that of the concert film.

== Track listing ==
All tracks are written by Ritchie Blackmore and Ronnie James Dio, except where noted.

Disc one
No.	Title	Writer(s)	Length
1.	"Kill the King"	Blackmore, Dio, Cozy Powell	4:38
2.	"Mistreated"	Blackmore, David Coverdale	11:03
3.	"Sixteenth Century Greensleeves"		8:21
4.	"Catch the Rainbow"		17:31
5.	"Long Live Rock 'n' Roll"		7:33

Disc 2
No.	Title	Writer(s)	Length
6.	"Man on the Silver Mountain"		14:37
7.	"Still I'm Sad"	Jim McCarty, Paul Samwell-Smith	25:16
8.	"Do You Close Your Eyes"		9:37

== DVD track listing ==
=== Live at Olympiahalle, Munich 20 October 1977 ===
1. Introduction - 1:44
2. "Kill the King" - 4:42
3. "Mistreated" – 11:49
4. "Sixteenth Century Greensleeves" – 8:52
5. "Catch the Rainbow" – 18:14
6. "Long Live Rock 'n' Roll" – 8:04
7. "Man on the Silver Mountain" – 16:25
8. "Still I'm Sad" – 27:33
9. "Do You Close Your Eyes" – 15:40

=== Special features ===
Music videos

- "Long Live Rock 'n' Roll" – 3:33
- "Gates of Babylon" – 6:37
- "LA Connection" – 5:12

Interviews

- Bob Daisley – 21:07
- Colin Hart – 9:38

Rainbow Over Texas '76 (2013 reissue only)

- Rising Tour - 12:46

Audio Commentary

- With slide show - 39:51

Photogallery

== Personnel ==
Rainbow

- Ritchie Blackmore - guitars
- Ronnie James Dio - lead vocals
- David Stone - keyboards
- Bob Daisley - bass, backing vocals
- Cozy Powell - drums, percussion

== Charts ==
=== CD ===
Chart (2006)	Peak position
German Albums (Offizielle Top 100)	73

=== DVD ===
Chart (2005–2006)	Peak position
Oricon Japanese DVD Chart	20
Australia DVD Chart	2

== Certifications ==
Region	Certification	Certified units/sales
Australia (ARIA)	Gold	7,500^{^}
^{^} Shipments figures based on certification alone.
