= Live in Munich =

Live in Munich may refer to:

- Live in Munich (The Thad Jones/Mel Lewis Orchestra album), 1976
- Live in Munich 1977, a live album and DVD released by Ritchie Blackmore's Rainbow in 2006
- Live in Munich (Misery Index album), 2013
