= Toad (album) =

Studio album by Toad
- Released: April 1971
- Recorded: December 1970; De Lane Lea Studios, London
- Genre: Hard rock; heavy metal
- Label: Hallelujah
- Producer: Chris Schwegler

Toad chronology
Toad (1971)	Tomorrow Blue (1972)

Professional ratings
Review scores
Source	Rating
AllMusic	3.5/5 stars

Toad is the debut album by the Swiss rock band Toad, released in 1971 on Swiss record label Hallelujah. It was recorded in London and engineered by British producer Martin Birch. Benjamin Jaeger, the vocalist, left the group after the album was finished and was not replaced. Reissues in the 1990s included "Stay" and "Animals World", which had been released together on a single, also in 1971.

== Track listing ==
1. "Cottonwood Hill" (music – Frohlich, lyrics – Jaeger) 8:35
2. "A Life That Ain't Worth Living" (music & lyrics – Vergeat) 3:30
3. "Tank" (music & lyrics – Vergeat) 3:28
4. "They Say I'm Mad" (music – Vergeat, lyrics – Frohlich) 6:47
5. "Life Goes On" (music – Frohlich, lyrics – Jaeger) 11:58
6. "Pig's Walk" (music & lyrics – Vergeat) 7:26
7. "The One I Mean" (music – Vergeat, lyrics – Frohlich) 2:33

Bonus track on 1992 reissue

8. "Stay" (music – Vergeat & Frohlich, lyrics – Frohlich & Jaeger) 3:32

Additional bonus track on 1999 reissue

9. "Animals World" (music & lyrics – Vergeat)

== Personnel ==
- Vic Vergeat – guitar
- Werner Frohlich – bass
- Cosimo Lampis – drums
- Benjamin Jaeger – vocals
- Produced by Chris Schwegler
- Engineered by Martin Birch
