= Live in Germany 1976 =

Live in Germany 1976 (Live in Europe)

Live album by Rainbow
- Released: 5 November 1990
- Recorded: West Germany, 25–29 September 1976
- Genres: Hard rock, heavy metal
- Length: 99:37
- Label: Conoisseur Collection

Rainbow live albums chronology
Finyl Vinyl (1986)	Live in Germany 1976 (Live in Europe) (1990)	Deutschland Tournee 1976 (2006)

Live in Europe cover

Professional ratings
Review scores
Source	Rating
AllMusic	3/5 stars
Rock Brigade	7/10

Live in Germany 1976 is a live album released by Rainbow in 1990. The tracks are cherry-picked from a series of West German dates during their world tour in September 1976 (Cologne on the 25th, Düsseldorf on the 27th, Nuremberg on the 28th, and Munich on the 29th). It was re-released two years later in the USA as Live in Europe on a different label. The content is the same for both although sleeve notes differ.

A remixed 6-CD box set Deutschland Tournee 1976 featuring three of the four West German dates recorded in 1976 was released in Japan in 2006, with each concert being released as a separate 2CD package in Europe through the year.

== Track listing ==
All songs written by Ronnie James Dio and Ritchie Blackmore except where indicated

Disc one
No.	Title	Writer(s)	Recording location	Length
1.	"Kill the King"	Dio, Blackmore, Cozy Powell	Munich, 29 September 1976	5:25
2.	"Mistreated"	David Coverdale, Blackmore	Munich, 29 September 1976	16:00
3.	"Sixteenth Century Greensleeves"		Cologne, 25 September 1976	7:50
4.	"Catch the Rainbow"		Düsseldorf, 27 September 1976	14:50

Disc two
No.	Title	Writer(s)	Recording location	Length
1.	"Man on the Silver Mountain"		Nuremberg, 28 September 1976	13:37
2.	"Stargazer"		Cologne, 25 September 1976	17:10
3.	"Still I'm Sad"	Paul Samwell-Smith, Jim McCarty	Cologne, 25 September 1976	15:00
4.	"Do You Close Your Eyes"		Munich, 29 September 1976	9:45

== Personnel ==
Rainbow

- Ronnie James Dio - vocals
- Ritchie Blackmore - guitars
- Tony Carey - keyboards
- Jimmy Bain - bass
- Cozy Powell - drums

== Charts ==
Chart (1990)	Peak position
Finnish Albums (The Official Finnish Charts)	35
