= Octopuss =

Studio album by Cozy Powell
- Released: June 1983
- Recorded: September – October 1982
- Studio: Britannia Row Studios, London
- Genre: Hard rock, instrumental rock
- Length: 33:32
- Label: Polydor
- Producer: Bruce Payne, John Makepeace

Cozy Powell chronology
Tilt (1981)	Octopuss (1983)	The Drums Are Back (1992)

Professional ratings
Review scores
Source	Rating
AllMusic	2/5 stars

Octopuss is the third solo album by English drummer Cozy Powell, released in 1983.

== Track listing ==
=== Side one ===
1. "Up on the Downs" (Mel Galley, Cozy Powell) – 3:55
2. "633 Squadron" (Ron Goodwin) – 4:13
3. "Octopuss" (Powell, Colin Hodgkinson) – 5:35
4. "The Big Country" (Jerome Moross, Morty Neff, Jack Lewis) – 2:56

=== Side two ===
1. "Formula One" (Galley, Powell) – 3:21
2. "Princetown" (Galley, Powell) – 4:37
3. "Dartmoore" (Gary Moore) – 5:41
4. "The Rattler" (David Coverdale, Powell) – 2:57

== Personnel ==
- Cozy Powell – drums, percussion
- Colin Hodgkinson – bass guitar
- Mel Galley – guitars
- Gary Moore – guitars on "Dartmoore"
- Jon Lord – keyboards
- Don Airey – keyboards

Technical

- Bruce Payne and John Makepeace – production
- Mike Johnson and Nick Griffiths – engineering, mixing
