= Grinding Stone (album) =

Studio album by The Gary Moore Band
- Released: May 1973
- Genre: Blues rock, hard rock, progressive rock
- Length: 48:31
- Label: CBS
- Producer: Martin Birch

The Gary Moore Band chronology
Grinding Stone (1973)	Back on the Streets (1978)

Professional ratings
Review scores
Source	Rating
AllMusic	3/5 stars
Classic Rock	2/5 stars

Grinding Stone is the only studio album by The Gary Moore Band. Released in 1973, it was recorded between Moore's leaving Skid Row and joining Thin Lizzy.

It contains a mixture of styles that differ from his later solo work. Moore did not release another solo album until 1978’s Back on the Streets.

== Background ==
Moore put the band together after leaving the group Skid Row, signing to CBS Records. At the time, Moore was unsure about which direction he wanted to take his music in, and consequently the album features a variety of styles. These included the title track's blues shuffle, double-tracked lead guitars on "Time To Heal" and "Spirit", Latin rhythms reminiscent of Santana, and slide guitar on "Boogie My Way Back Home". Keyboardist Jan Schelhaas guested on the album, as did Irish guitarist Philip Donnelly.

Moore split up the band so he could join Thin Lizzy as a replacement for Eric Bell. Drummer Pearse Kelly briefly covered for Thin Lizzy's Brian Downey while the latter was ill. He would revisit some of the jazz fusion styles explored on the album with the group Colosseum II.

== Reception ==
The album was favourably reviewed by Billboard, who thought "Sail Across the Mountain" was its strongest track. It was not commercially successful, and did not chart. Moore would not release another album under his own name until Back on the Streets five years later, after several years in Colosseum II and another stint in Thin Lizzy.

A retrospective review in AllMusic was mixed, saying that while the eclectic and varied styles were interesting, it was not Moore's best album. However, the reviewer felt the album helped explain Moore's change in styles between Skid Row and Colosseum II, and concluded that it was an overlooked album in his solo career.

== Track listing ==
All tracks are written by Gary Moore

Side One
No.	Title	Length
1.	"Grinding Stone" (instrumental)	9:42
2.	"Time to Heal"	6:22
3.	"Sail Across the Mountain"	6:59

Side Two
No.	Title	Length
4.	"The Energy Dance" (instrumental)	2:29
5.	"Spirit"	17:16
6.	"Boogie My Way Back Home"	5:38

== Personnel ==
The Gary Moore Band

- Gary Moore – lead guitar, vocals
- John Curtis – bass
- Pearse Kelly – drums, percussion

Additional personnel

- Frank Boylan – bass
- Philip Donnelly – rhythm guitar
- Jan Schelhaas – keyboards

Production

- Martin Birch – producer, engineer
