= Ritchie Blackmore (disambiguation) =

Ritchie Blackmore may refer to:

- Ritchie Blackmore, an English guitarist and songwriter. Also part of Rainbow and of the music duo Blackmore's Night
  - Ritchie Blackmore's Rainbow, first album by British rock guitarist Ritchie Blackmore's solo band Rainbow
  - Ritchie Blackmore Stratocaster, an alternative known name for the electric guitar Fender Stratocaster

== See also ==
- Richie Blackmore (rugby league), New Zealand rugby league player and coach
