= Over the Top (Cozy Powell album) =

Studio album by Cozy Powell
- Released: 19 October 1979
- Studios: Central Sound Studios, Manchester; Townhouse Studios, London
- Genre: Instrumental rock
- Length: 44:28
- Label: Polydor
- Producer: Martin Birch

Cozy Powell chronology
Over the Top (1979)	Tilt (1981)

Professional ratings
Review scores
Source	Rating
Music Week	3/4 stars

Over the Top is an album by British rock drummer Cozy Powell. It was Powell's first solo album, and it featured many well-known musicians playing alongside him.

Although the album initially did not chart, It reached No. 34 on the UK Albums Chart in January 1980. "Theme One" was released as a single and reached No. 62.

== Track listing ==
1. "Theme One" (George Martin) – 3:36
2. "Killer" (Don Airey) – 7:16
3. "Heidi Goes to Town" (Cozy Powell, Airey) – 2:57
4. "El Sid" (Bernie Marsden) – 5:09
5. "Sweet Poison" (Max Middleton) – 8:24
6. "The Loner" (Dedicated to Jeff Beck) (Middleton) – 4:50
7. "Over the Top" (Airey, Powell, Pyotr Tchaikovsky) – 8:39

The Polydor Years Bonus Tracks

1. "Over The Top (Single Edit)" – 3:21
2. "The Loner (Single Edit)" – 3:10
3. "Heidi Goes To Town (#1)" – 2:59
4. "Heidi Goes To Town (#2)" – 2:59
5. "Sweet Poison (#1 Lead & Rhythm Guitars)" – 6:30
6. "Sweet Poison (#2 Rhythm Guitars)" – 6:30
7. "Sweet Poison (#3 Backing Tracks, No Guitar)" – 6:30
8. "The Loner (#1 Lead Guitar)" – 4:52

== Personnel ==
- Cozy Powell – drums
- Gary Moore – guitars (track 2)
- Clem Clempson – guitars (tracks 5, 6)
- Bernie Marsden – guitars (track 4)
- Jack Bruce – bass guitar
- Don Airey – keyboards (except track 6)
- Max Middleton – keyboards (track 6)

== Album credits ==
- Produced and engineered by Martin Birch.
- Mastered by Ian Cooper of Utopia Sounds
- Tape ops: Lou Broglia and Alan Douglas.
- Recorded at Central Sound and Track 2 at The Town House, London.
- Mixed at The Town House.
- All tracks arranged by Don Airey.
- Photography: Bob Carlos Clarke
- Art Direction and artwork: Ian Murray/Acrobat Design Ltd.
- Cover concept: Cozy Powell
- Max Middleton appears courtesy of Epic Records.
- Gary Moore appears courtesy of MCA Records.
- Bernie Marsden appears courtesy of United Artists Records
- Cozy Powell appears courtesy of Swindon Town Football Club.
- Thanks to: Roger Glover, Neil Murray, Tchaikovsky, Terry Yeardon and Silverstone.
- Co-ordination: Bobby Adcock (LFC)
- Management: Bruce Payne
- Mr Powell's drums by Yamaha, his cymbals by Paiste.
- This album was recorded without a safety net.
- "Lyrics enclosed." (This statement was tongue-in-cheek, as Over the Top is an all-instrumental album)
