= Tilt (Cozy Powell album) =

Studio album by Cozy Powell
- Released: December 1981
- Studio: Britannia Row Studios, London
- Genre: Hard rock, instrumental rock, jazz fusion
- Length: 35:53
- Label: Polydor
- Producer: Cozy Powell, Guy Bidmead

Cozy Powell chronology
Over the Top (1979)	Tilt (1981)	Octopuss (1983)

Professional ratings
Review scores
Source	Rating
AllMusic	3/5 stars

Tilt (known as Thunder Storm in Japan) is the second solo album by English drummer Cozy Powell, released in 1981.

== Track listing ==
=== Side one ===
No.	Title	Length
1.	"The Right Side" (Kirby Gregory, John Cook)	3:50
2.	"Jekyll & Hyde" (Gregory, Cook)	4:38
3.	"Sooner or Later" (Gregory, Elmer Gantry)	3:02
4.	"Living a Lie" (Cozy Powell, Bernie Marsden, Don Airey)	5:37

=== Side two ===
No.	Title	Length
1.	"Cat Moves" (Jan Hammer)	5:12
2.	"Sunset" (Gary Moore)	4:32
3.	"The Blister" (Moore, Airey)	4:22
4.	"Hot Rock" (Hammer)	4:36

=== CD release ===
No.	Title	Length
1.	"Cat Moves" (Hammer)	5:10
2.	"Sunset" (Moore)	4:29
3.	"Living a Lie" (Powell, Marsden, Airey)	5:34
4.	"Hot Rock" (Hammer)	4:36
5.	"The Blister" (Moore, Airey)	4:21
6.	"The Right Side" (Gregory, Cook)	3:49
7.	"Jekyll & Hyde" (Gregory, Cook)	4:36
8.	"Sooner or Later" (Gregory, Gantry)	3:00

== Personnel ==
- Cozy Powell – drums
- Elmer Gantry – lead vocals on "Right Side", "Jekyll & Hyde" and "Sooner or Later"
- Frank Aiello – lead vocals on "Living a Lie"
- Kirby Gregory – guitars on "Right Side", "Jekyll & Hyde" and "Sooner or Later"
- Bernie Marsden – guitars on "Living a Lie"
- Jeff Beck – guitars on "Cat Moves" and "Hot Rock"
- Gary Moore – guitars on "Sunset" and "The Blister"
- Chris Glen – bass guitar on "Right Side", "Jekyll & Hyde" & "Sooner or Later"
- Neil Murray – bass guitar on "Living a Lie"
- Jack Bruce – bass guitar on "Cat Moves"
- John Cook – keyboards, Moog Taurus on "The Blister" and "Hot Rock"
- Don Airey – keyboards on "Sunset" and "The Blister"
- Mel Collins – saxophone on "The Right Side"
- David Sancious – synthesiser on "Cat Moves"
