= Toad (band) =

Swiss hard rock band

- Also known as: Vic Vea Band
- Origin: Basel, Switzerland
- Genres: Hard rock, blues rock, heavy metal, acid rock, psychedelic rock, funk rock
- Years active: 1970–1995
- Labels: Hallelujah, RCA, Polydor, Frog
- Past members: Vittorio "Vic" Vergeat; Werner Fröhlich; Cosimo Lampis; André Buser; Benjamin Jäger; Caesar Perrig; Claudio Salsi; Kelvin Bullen

Toad were a Swiss hard rock band formed in Basel, Switzerland, in 1970. The band went through lineup changes, but the longest lasting and most consistent lineup was a trio of Vic Vergeat on lead guitar and vocals, and ex-Brainticket members Werner Fröhlich on bass and vocals, and Cosimo Lampis on drums.

Their best known songs were covers of Jimi Hendrix's "Purple Haze" and the Beatles' "I Saw Her Standing There", along with originals "Usin' My Life" and "Stay!". Their first two albums were engineered by Martin Birch. Though the band was not commercially successful outside of their own country, they were a popular live act because of their ferocity, musicianship and stage antics, most notably when Vergeat played the guitar with his teeth. Their concerts were often compared to those of Jimi Hendrix.

== History ==
Toad was formed in 1970 by guitarist Vittorio 'Vic' Vergeat, bassist Werner Fröhlich and drummer Cosimo Lampis. Vergeat had played with the British space rock group Hawkwind in London in 1969. Fröhlich and Lampis had left European psychedelic rock band Brainticket after the recording of their first album, Cottonwoodhill. Toad wrote and recorded material for their self-titled album in late 1970, and released the record in 1971, along with "Stay!", a single that did fairly well and made a great deal of headway in the Swiss charts – a feat that no other hard rock band had accomplished. The album was mixed by British producer Martin Birch (who also produced for Deep Purple, Iron Maiden and Black Sabbath). It featured singer Benjamin "Beni" Jaeger, who left the band once it was finished. As the album was being released in 1971, Swiss Television filmed Toad performing at the Montreux Jazz Festival, but the footage has been lost.

In 1972, the band released Tomorrow Blue, which was in a more blues direction and without a lead vocalist (with Vergeat and Fröhlich taking over vocal duties). It also was engineered by Birch. It included Helmut Lipsky on violin, who played prominently on the tracks "Blind Chapman's Tales", "Change In Time" and the single "Green Ham." Later the same year, the band recorded the album Open Fire: Live in Basel 1972, which included covers of Hendrix's "Red House" and the Band of Gypsys' "Who Knows."

In 1975, they released their third album, Dreams, which contained all original songs, a mix of hard rock, progressive rock and blues rock. They also released a cover version of the Hendrix composition "Purple Haze" on a single with a B-side of Toad original "Making You Feel Right". The two songs were included as bonus tracks on a later re-release of Dreams.

Their history after that is largely undocumented except for a live album recorded in Geneva during 1978 and a studio album released in the early 1990s with different versions of the band. The rest of the 1970s and 1980s were spent appearing on a few compilations, releasing live albums and performing while slowly fading into relative obscurity. Sometime between 1979 and 1988, bassist Fröhlich left the group and was replaced by Kelvin Bullen. After he departed in the early 1990s, he was replaced by André Buser, who would remain with the band until its end. In 1986, Toad made an appearance at the St. Gallen Open Air Festival in St. Gallen, Switzerland.

In 1993, Toad released the studio album Stop This Crime. Following its release, drummer Lampis departed from the group and was replaced by Claudio Salsi, who remained until Toad broke up. Lampis went on to create a school in Sardinia. In 1994, Toad played a concert in Brienz, Switzerland, which provided the material for the live album, The Real Thing. In about 1995, Toad broke up, following which the album Hate To Hate was released. It contained the same tracks as Stop This Crime, but with a different cover and title.

Vergeat went on a solo career, releasing many albums over the years. He then formed and toured with his own band, the Vic Vergeat Band. He died on 1 November 2023 from an undisclosed cause. The other former members went on to other groups or retired from the music business.

The band never achieved great success outside of their own country, but were influential on the Swiss heavy metal movement during the 1980s, influencing Krokus and Celtic Frost. They saw renewed interest in the early 2000s among the European hard rock scene. Their albums have been re-released and remastered for new generation of listeners and a CD boxed set, packaged to look like miniature vinyl records was released.

== Band members ==
Original members

- Benjamin "Beni" Jaeger – lead vocals
- Vittorio "Vic" Vergeat – guitars, backing vocals, keyboards, piano, mellotron
- Werner Fröhlich – bass, backing vocals, moog synthesizer
- Cosimo Lampis – drums, congas, percussion, backing vocals

Later members

- André Buser – bass
- Caesar Perrig – bass
- Kelvin Bullen – bass
- Claudio Salsi – drums

== Discography ==
Studio albums

- 1971 – Toad
- 1972 – Tomorrow Blue
- 1975 – Dreams
- 1993 – Stop This Crime
- 1995 – Hate to Hate
- 2003 – B.U.F.O (Blues United Fighting Organization)
- 2004 – Behind the Wheels (reissue of 1992's Rarities)

Live albums

- 1973 – Open Fire: Live in Basel 1972
- 1978 – Yearnin' Learnin': Live 1978 (recorded live in Geneva)
- 1994 – The Real Thing (recorded live in Brienz)
- 2005 – Live at St. Joseph (Basel) 22.04.1972 (copy from Live at St. Joseph)

Compilation albums

- 1978 – The Best of Toad
- 1979 – Tomorrow Blue
- 1992 – Rarities
- 1999 – Toad Trilogy
- 2003 – Toad Box

Singles

- 1971 – "Stay!" / "Animal's World"
- 1971 – "I Saw Her Standing There" / "Green Ham"
- 1972 – "Fly" / "No Need"
- 1975 – "Purple Haze" / "Making You Feel Right"
- 1977 – "Baby You" / "I'm Going"

== Filmography ==
- 1971 – Montreux Jazz Festival (recorded live by Swiss Television)
- 1978 – Toad on the Road (directed by Paul Grau)
- 1986 – St. Gallen Open Air Festival
- 1994 – The Real Thing (recorded live in Brienz)

== See also ==
- Rock music in Switzerland

== Sources ==
- Freeman, Steven; Freeman, Alan (1996). A Crack in the Cosmic Egg. Audion Publications. ISBN 978-0952950608.
