= Vic Vergeat =

Italian musician (1951–2023)

- Also known as: Vic Vea
- Born: Vittorio Vergeat; May 15, 1951; Domodossola, Italy
- Died: November 1, 2023 (aged 72)
- Genres: rock music
- Occupations: musician, record producer
- Instrument: guitar
- Years active: 1960s–2010s
- Formerly of: Toad

Vittorio "Vic" Vergeat (15 May 1951 – 1 November 2023) was an Italian guitarist, singer-songwriter, and music producer.

== Biography ==
Born in Domodossola on 15 May 1951, Vergeat began his career with the Piedmontese group, the Black Birds, which released a successful single in 1966, titled "Dolce Delilah". He then moved to London where he played with Hawkwind before joining the Swiss group Toad, with whom he produced multiple records in the 1970s, including the album Tomorrow Blue. After leaving the group, he moved to the United States, where he recorded an album titled Vic Vergat Band, with production by Dieter Dierks of the Scorpions. During the 1980s, he formed The Bank, a Swiss rock group.

Vic Vergeat died in Domodossola on 1 November 2023, at the age of 72.

== Discography ==
=== With the Black Birds ===
- Dolce Delilah/Torna verso il sole (1967)

=== With Toad ===
- Toad (1971)
- Tomorrow Blue (1972)
- Dreams (1975)
- Hate to Hate (1993)

=== With The Bank ===
- Victims of a Mistery (1985)
- Stop AIDS (1986)

=== With Marc Storace ===
- Blue (1992)
- When A Man... (1998)

=== With David Hasselhoff ===
- Pingu Hits (1993)

=== Solo ===
- Down to the Bone (1981)
- No Compromise! (2002)
- Comet Records All Stars - Live at the Torrita Blues Festival 2002 (2002)
- Live at Music Village (2006)
