= Cozy Powell =

British rock drummer (1947–1998)

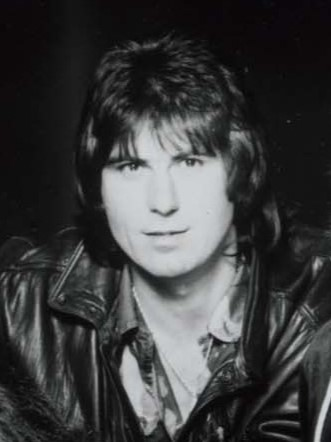
- Powell in 1984

Background information
- Born: Colin Trevor Flooks; 29 December 1947; Cirencester, Gloucestershire, England
- Died: 5 April 1998 (aged 50) M4 motorway, near Bristol, England
- Genres: Hard rock; heavy metal; progressive rock; blues rock; glam rock; instrumental rock; jazz fusion
- Occupation: Drummer
- Years active: 1964–1998
- Website: cozypowell.com

Cozy Powell (born Colin Trevor Flooks; 29 December 1947 – 5 April 1998) was an English drummer who made his name with major rock bands and artists such as The Jeff Beck Group, Rainbow, Michael Schenker Group, Gary Moore, Graham Bonnet, Brian May, Whitesnake, Emerson, Lake & Powell, and Black Sabbath.

Powell appeared on at least 66 albums, contributing to many other recordings. He is widely regarded as one of the greatest and most influential drummers of all time; many rock drummers have cited him as a major influence.

== Early life ==
Colin Trevor Flooks (Cozy Powell) was born in Cirencester, Gloucestershire, on 29 December 1947 and was adopted. He never knowingly met his birth parents. He started playing drums aged 12 in the school orchestra, thereafter playing along in his spare time to popular singles of the day. The first band Powell was in, the Corals, played each week at the youth club in Cirencester. They also played at a youth club in Latton, seven miles (11 km) from Cirencester. During this time the band broke the world record for non-stop playing without playing the same song twice. Aged 15, Cozy had already worked out an impressive drum solo.

The stage name Cozy was borrowed from the jazz drummer Cozy Cole. His last name Powell was taken from his adoptive mother's maiden name.

== Career ==
The semi-professional circuit was next with The Sorcerers, a vocal-harmony pop band. The late nights and usual on-the-road exploits began to affect his education, and Powell left to take an office job to finance the purchase of his first set of Premier drums. The Sorcerers performed in the German club scene of the 1960s.

By 1968 the band had returned to England, basing themselves in the Birmingham area. Powell struck up friendships with notable local musicians, including Robert Plant, John Bonham, future Slade vocalist Noddy Holder, bassist Dave Pegg and Tony Iommi. The Sorcerers, then renamed Youngblood, released a series of singles in late 1968 and 1969. The group then linked up with The Move's bassist/singer Ace Kefford to form The Ace Kefford Stand. Five recorded tracks are available on the Ace Kefford album Ace The Face, released by Sanctuary Records in 2003. Powell also began session work and, with fellow Sorcerers Dave and Denny Ball, formed Big Bertha.

=== Isle of Wight 1970 and Jeff Beck ===
Powell also played with swamp rocker Tony Joe White at the Isle of Wight Festival 1970. Powell landed the then highly prestigious drumming job with Jeff Beck's group in April 1970. Their first project was to record an album of Motown covers in the US. This was never finished and remains unreleased. During the sessions, photographs show Cozy Powell and Jeff Beck present at the recording of Stevie Wonder's "Superstition", on which Beck appears. Cozy has stated in interviews he plays on the record, but this remains to be confirmed. After the recording of two albums, Rough and Ready (October 1971) and Jeff Beck Group (July 1972), the band fell apart.

=== 1972–1974 ===
In 1972 Powell drummed for two tracks ("Hey Sandy" and "Martha") on Harvey Andrews' album Writer of Songs. By late 1972 he had joined up with the Ball brothers and singer Frank Aiello to form Bedlam, whose eponymous album was recorded for Chrysalis and released in August 1973.

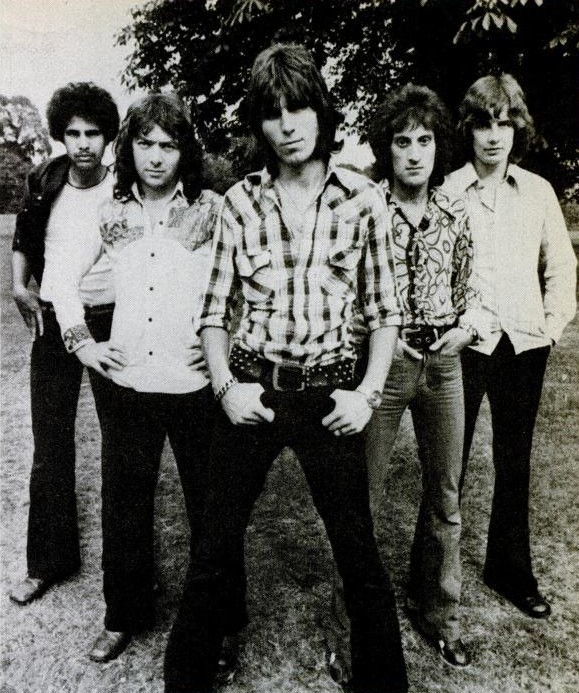
Powell (middle) with Cozy Powell's Hammer in 1974 left to right: Clive Chaman, Bernie Marsden, Powell, Frank Aiello and Don Airey

With Powell's session work at RAK Records and subsequent solo success (including "Dance with the Devil", which reached No. 3 in the UK singles chart during January 1974), Bedlam fell apart.

"Dance with the Devil" was his only solo hit in North America, reaching No. 48 in Canada for four weeks, and No. 49 in the United States. The track featured Suzi Quatro on bass. Powell's second hit during 1974 was with "The Man in Black", which reached No. 18. Arrows front man Alan Merrill, also a RAK Records artist, played electric bass on '"The Man in Black'" and the b-side '"After Dark".

Jeff Beck's studio producer was Mickie Most and Powell soon found himself drafted into sessions for artists signed to Most's RAK label, including Julie Felix, Hot Chocolate, Donovan and Suzi Quatro. To cash in on his chart success, the drummer formed "Cozy Powell's Hammer" in April 1974. The line-up included Bernie Marsden (guitar), Clive Chaman (bass), Don Airey (keyboards) and Frank Aiello (Bedlam) on vocals. Clive Chaman was replaced on bass by Neil Murray in the band in early 1975 for the RAK Rocks Britain Tour. "Na Na Na" was a UK No. 10 hit, and another single "Le Souk" was recorded but never released.

Sharing a love of the power-trio set up (Cream), Cozy Powell formed a band with guitarist Clem Clempson and bassist Greg Ridley (Humble Pie), but when this fell apart Cozy temporarily quit the music business to take up motorcycle racing. His desire to launch a three-piece in the vein of Cream remained; recordings with Tipton, Entwistle & Powell are testament to this as much as sessions with Cream's Jack Bruce and on guitar Uli Jon Roth, briefly after recording for Cinderella: "to get him (Uli Roth) had been the idea of Larry Mazer (at the time manager of Cinderella), Jack met him, but at the time Uli was busy with a symphony. I don't think it would have worked, we had him in mind as well as some other people, like Gary Moore, ideally Jeff Beck really", followed by Clem Clempson, Pat Travers and Pat Thrall with whom they recorded, shopped for a deal - unsuccessfully—until Powell would join Black Sabbath.

=== 1975–1980: Rainbow ===
In 1975, Powell joined Rainbow. Over the next five years he and guitarist Ritchie Blackmore were the only constants in the line-up. During this time, Blackmore developed the band's sound from neoclassical hard rock-heavy metal to a more commercial AOR sound. Powell grew concerned with the overtly commercial direction and decided to leave, although not before Rainbow headlined the first Monsters of Rock show at Castle Donington, England, on 16 August 1980. This was his last show with the band. Powell became the first musician to appear at Monsters of Rock with different bands, when he returned with Whitesnake in 1983.

=== 1980–1983: Bonnet, Michael Schenker, Phenomena ===
After leaving Rainbow, Powell again worked with vocalist Graham Bonnet, their most notable single being "Night Games" from Bonnet's solo album Line-Up, which reached number 6 in the UK singles chart.

For the rest of the 1980s, Powell assumed short-term journeyman roles with a number of major bands including The Michael Schenker Group. In 1985 he started recording with Phenomena for their self-titled first album, which was released the same year. He also worked briefly with another new supergroup named Forcefield along with Bonnet and later Tony Martin on vocals, former Ian Gillan Band member Ray Fenwick and former Focus member Jan Akkerman on the guitars, Neil Murray and later Laurence Cottle on bass. Cottle would eventually join as a session player for the recording of Black Sabbath's Headless Cross album in 1989 and again was replaced by Murray following that tour.

=== 1982–1985: Whitesnake ===
Powell was invited to join Whitesnake in late of 1982 after his departure from Michael Schenker Group to replace Ian Paice for a presumed farewell tour with the band in Europe, but after the success of the Saints & Sinners album in the British and Japanese charts, and a successful tour that culminated in a memorable performance at the Monsters of Rock Festival in August 1983, the band signed with the American label Geffen Records. Due to contractual obligations, the band had to release one more album for their previous label Liberty which would be 1984's Slide It In.

Now under guidance of A&R executive John Kalodner, the album was remixed with the help of producer Keith Olsen for the American market with Cozy, guitarist Mel Galley and keyboardist Jon Lord the only remaining members of the previous line up along with singer David Coverdale and new guitarist John Sykes. Powell's tenure with the band ended in January 1985 after an appearance at the Rock in Rio festival in Brazil. After that he was asked to join Keith Emerson and Greg Lake in a revamped version of ELP: Emerson, Lake and Powell.

=== 1988–1998: Black Sabbath and solo ===
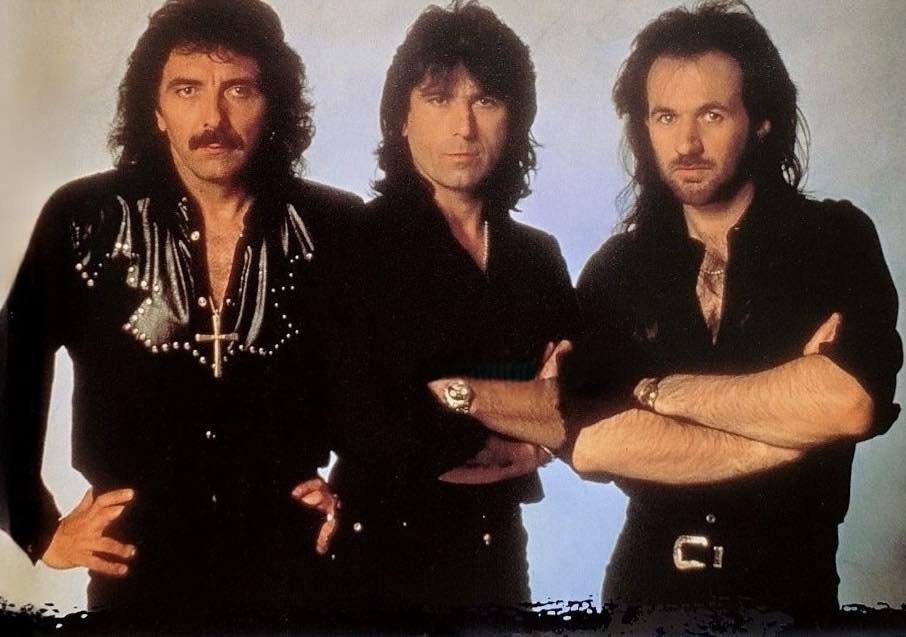
L-R: Tony Iommi, Powell, and Tony Martin during the recording session of Black Sabbath's Headless Cross, c. 1988

Powell worked with Gary Moore in 1988, followed by stints with Black Sabbath from 1988 to 1991, and again in 1994–1995.

Between late 1992 and early 1993, Powell put together an occasional touring band using the old band name 'Cozy Powell's Hammer' featuring himself on drums, Mario Parga on guitar and fellow Sabbath members Neil Murray on bass, Tony Martin on vocals, and occasional rhythm guitar/synth module. The band performed throughout Europe and appeared on German television. Powell made headlines in 1986 when he appeared on the BBC children's programme Record Breakers, where he set a world record for the most drums (400) played in under one minute, live on television.

Powell and Neil Murray were members of Brian May's band, playing on the Back to the Light and Another World albums. He played with May opening for Guns N' Roses on the second American leg of their Use Your Illusion Tour in 1993. The duo also served a spell with blues guitarist Peter Green in the mid-nineties. Powell briefly joined Yngwie Malmsteen for the album Facing the Animal in 1997.

Powell's last recording session was for Colin Blunstone's The Light Inside, alongside Don Airey, which was released shortly after Powell's death. The final solo album by Cozy Powell Especially for You was released in 1998 after his death, and featured American vocalist John West, Neil Murray, Lonnie Park, Michael Casswell and others.

== Death ==
Powell died on 5 April 1998 following a car crash while driving his Saab 9000 at 104 mph (167 km/h) in bad weather on the M4 motorway near Bristol. He was involved in an affair with a married woman who was having problems with her husband. Upset, she phoned him and asked him to come quickly to her house which was approximately 35 miles (56 km) away. As he was driving to her house, she phoned him again and asked "Where are you?" He informed her he was on his way and she then heard him say "Oh shit!" followed by a loud bang.

Powell was ejected through the windscreen and was declared dead on arrival at nearby Frenchay Hospital. According to the BBC report, at the time of the crash Powell's blood-alcohol reading was over the legal limit, and he was not wearing a seat belt, in addition to talking with his girlfriend on his mobile phone. The official investigation also found evidence of a slow puncture in a rear tyre that, it was suggested, could well have caused a sudden collapse of the tyre with a consequent loss of control of the car.

He was living in Lambourn in Berkshire at the time and had returned to the studio shortly before his death to record with Fleetwood Mac founder Peter Green. At the time of death, Powell had recently pulled out of tour rehearsals with Yngwie Malmsteen, having suffered an injury in a motorcycle accident.

A memorial plaque at the Corn Hall in Cirencester was unveiled in January 2016 in a ceremony led by Brian May, with Suzi Quatro, Bernie Marsden, Neil Murray, Don Airey and Tony Iommi in attendance.

A documentary, provisionally titled Dance With The Devil: The Legend of Cozy Powell, was in production for several years until at least 2016 but is as yet uncompleted. In 2024, another independently-made documentary, Hammer: The Life Story of Cozy Powell, was released on YouTube.

== Posthumous releases ==
In October 2005, Powell made a "new" appearance on an album. Former Black Sabbath vocalist Tony Martin released a studio album (Scream), and on it is a track named "Raising Hell". This was a track Powell had recorded the drum track for when he and Martin were in Hammer in 1992, and gave to Martin for "future use". There are apparently as many as 19 additional drum tracks also recorded that could turn up in the future. Judas Priest guitarist Glenn Tipton has also released material recorded during the 1997 Baptizm of Fire sessions; this 2006 collection, titled Edge of the World, was released under the moniker of Tipton, Entwistle & Powell in memory of John Entwistle and Powell.

== Band timeline (not including session work) ==
Text in bold indicates solo work.

- The Corals (1964–1966)
- The Sorcerers (1966–1968)
- Youngblood (1968)
- The Ace Kefford Stand (1968–1969)
- Big Bertha (1969–1970)
- The Jeff Beck Group (1970–1972)
- Bedlam (1972–1973)
- **Cozy Powell** (1973–1974, 1979–1983, 1992, 1998)
- **Cozy Powell's Hammer** (1974–1975, 1992–1993)
- Rainbow (1975–1980)
- Graham Bonnet (1980–1981)
- Michael Schenker Group (1980–1982)
- Whitesnake (1982–1985)
- Phenomena (1984–1987)
- Emerson, Lake & Powell (1985–1986)
- CAJO (1986)
- Pete York/Cozy Powell (1987)
- Blue Murder (1987)
- Forcefield (1987–1990)
- Black Sabbath (1988–1991, 1994–1995)
- The Brian May Band (1991–1992, 1993–1994, 1998)
- Tipton, Entwistle & Powell (1994–1997)
- Peter Green Splinter Group (1996–1998)
- Yngwie Malmsteen (1997–1998)
- The Snakes (1998)

== Discography ==
Year	Band	Title	
1971	The Jeff Beck Group	Rough & Ready	Studio
1972	The Jeff Beck Group	Jeff Beck Group	Studio
1973	Bedlam	Bedlam	Studio
1973	**Cozy Powell's Hammer**	Dance with the Devil	Single
1974	**Cozy Powell's Hammer**	The Man in Black	Single
1974	**Cozy Powell's Hammer**	Na Na Na	Single
1976	Rainbow	Rising	Studio
1977	Rainbow	On Stage	Live
1978	Rainbow	Long Live Rock 'n' Roll	Studio
1979	Rainbow	Down to Earth	Studio
1979	Cozy Powell	Theme One	Single
1979	**Cozy Powell**	Over the Top	Studio
1980	Rainbow	Monsters Of Rock	Live
1981	**Cozy Powell**	Tilt	Studio
1981	Graham Bonnet	Line-Up	Studio
1981	The Michael Schenker Group	MSG	Studio
1982	The Michael Schenker Group	One Night at Budokan	Live
1983	**Cozy Powell**	Octopuss	Studio
1983	Whitesnake	Live at Castle Donington	Video
1984	Whitesnake	Slide It In	Studio
1986	Emerson, Lake & Powell	Emerson, Lake & Powell	Studio
1986	Rainbow	Finyl Vinyl	Live
1987	Forcefield	Forcefield	Studio
1988	Forcefield	Forcefield II: The Talisman	Studio
1989	Forcefield	Forcefield III: To Oz and Back	Studio
1989	Black Sabbath	Headless Cross	Studio
1990	Black Sabbath	Tyr	Studio
1990	Rainbow	Live in Germany 1976	Live
1991	Forcefield	Forcefield IV: Let the Wild Run Free	Studio
1992	Forcefield	Instrumentals	Compilation
1992	Brian May	Back to the Light	Studio
1992	**Cozy Powell**	The Drums Are Back	Studio
1993	Cozy Powell	Resurrection	Single
1994	The Brian May Band	Live at the Brixton Academy	Live
1995	Black Sabbath	Forbidden	Studio
1997	**Cozy Powell**	The Best of Cozy Powell	Compilation
1997	Peter Green Splinter Group	Peter Green Splinter Group	Studio
1997	Yngwie Malmsteen	Facing the Animal	Studio
1998	Brian May	Another World	Studio
1998	Brian May	Red Special	EP
1999	Bedlam	Anthology	Compilation
1999	**Cozy Powell**	Especially for You	Studio
2003	Bedlam	Live in London 1973	Live
2003	Emerson, Lake & Powell	The Sprocket Sessions	Live
2003	Emerson, Lake & Powell	Live in Concert	Live
2004	Big Bertha	Live in Hamburg 1970	Live
2006	Tipton, Entwistle & **Powell**	Edge of the World	Studio
2006	Rainbow	Deutschland Tournee 1976	Live
2006	Rainbow	Live in Munich 1977	Live
2014	Whitesnake	Live In 1984: Back To The Bone	Live
2015	Rainbow	Down To Earth Tour 1979	Live
2016	Rainbow	Monsters of Rock - Live at Donington 1980	Live

=== Guest appearances and sessions ===
- Tony Joe White – Swamp Music: The Complete Monument Recordings (2006) – Live at the Isle of Wight Festival 1970
- Ed Welch – Clowns (1971)
- Harvey Andrews – Writer of Songs (1972)
- Julie Felix – Clotho's Web (1972)
- Donovan – Cosmic Wheels (1973)
- Chick Churchill – You and Me (1973)
- Murray Head – Nigel Lived (1973)
- Tony Ashton and Jon Lord – First of the Big Bands (1974)
- Bob Sargeant – The First Starring Role (1974)
- Peter Sarstedt – Every Word You Say (1975)
- Various – Peter and the Wolf (1975) - including Phil Collins, Brian Eno, Gary Moore, Alvin Lee, Chris Spedding, etc.
- Hot Chocolate – XIV Greatest Hits (1976)
- Bernie Marsden – And About Time Too! (1979)
- Bernie Marsden – Look at Me Now (1981)
- Jon Lord – Before I Forget (1982)
- Robert Plant – Pictures at Eleven (1982)
- Phenomena – Phenomena (1985)
- Roger Daltrey – Under a Raging Moon (1985)
- Boys Don't Cry – Who the Am Dam do You Think We Am (1987)
- Sanne Salomonsen – Ingen Engel (Danish Version) / No Angel (English Version) (1987)
- Warlock – Triumph and Agony (1987)
- Pete York – Super Drumming Vol. 1 (1987)
- Cinderella – Long Cold Winter (1988)
- James Darby – Southern Region Breakdown (1988)
- Don Airey – K2 – Tales of Triumph and Tragedy (1988)
- Gary Moore – After the War (1989)
- Minute By Minute – Timewatch (1989)
- Ritchie Blackmore – Rock Profile Vol. 2 (1991)
- Various Artists – In From The Storm – The Music of Jimi Hendrix (1995)
- Glenn Tipton – Baptizm of Fire (1997)
- S.A.S. Band – SAS Band (1997)
- Colin Blunstone – The Light Inside (1998)
- Ace Kefford – Ace The Face (2003)
- Tony Martin – Scream (2005)
- Pete York – Super Drumming Vol. 3 (2008)

== Motor racing and TV appearances ==
Powell had a fascination with fast cars and motorbikes, and raced a Mazda RX3 sponsored by Hitachi on the UK saloon car circuit for a few months in the mid-seventies. He was quoted as saying in an interview, "I drive like I drum – madly".

== See also ==
- Cozy Powell Forever – tribute album to Cozy Powell
