= Mistreated (song) =

Song by Deep Purple

from the album Burn
- Released: 15 February 1974
- Recorded: November 1973; Montreux, Switzerland
- Genre: Hard rock, blues rock
- Length: 7:28
- Label: EMI (UK); Warner Bros. (US)
- Songwriters: Ritchie Blackmore, David Coverdale
- Producer: Deep Purple

"Mistreated" is a song by the English rock band Deep Purple taken from their 1974 album Burn. The song was written by the band's guitarist Ritchie Blackmore and new vocalist David Coverdale, who, along with new bassist Glenn Hughes, brought new blues and funk elements to the band.

== History ==
At live performances Hughes would introduce "Mistreated" as a song that Blackmore had written about two years prior to Burn. Inspired by the Free song "Heartbreaker", the song had been considered for the band's earlier album Who Do We Think We Are, but Ritchie held it back. When work on Burn started, Coverdale wrote the lyrics to "Mistreated", and it is the only song on Burn where he sings the lyrics entirely himself.

During the studio recording for "Mistreated", most of the instrumental tracks were recorded from 11PM to 7:30 AM. When it was time for Coverdale to hear his own vocal parts after the first playback, he found it to be mediocre, which upset him. Coverdale demanded it to be perfect for the next take. "It was so bad I just sat down and cried because I wanted it to be so good," Coverdale remembered the following night. The next night followed another session and Coverdale took a second try to attempt to get the perfect voice he wanted on the record. Coverdale admitted the pressure he was going through during the recording, although he was very timid at that time. Blackmore's solo near the end of the song was at first layered heavily by Coverdale and Hughes' chorus vocals, making it extremely hard to hear the solo. As a result, the stems that aided the vocals were deleted, which again upset Coverdale. Coverdale agreed with Blackmore's argument that it could not have too many vocal recordings, otherwise it would disorient the guitar's sound.

During the mixing of "Mistreated", Coverdale and Hughes recorded a dozen vocal tracks for the final chorus towards the end of the song. In Blackmore's view, the backing vocals overlapped the guitar solo, so the vocal stems were muted throughout the process. Coverdale was upset about the change and felt that the drama created by overlapping vocal tracks had been almost completely lost.

Hughes participated in songwriting but did not get credits due to contractual obligations with Blackmore. However, the 30th-anniversary edition of the album included Hughes in the credits for all the tracks except "Sail Away", "Mistreated", "'A' 200" and bonus track "Coronarias Redig".

== Composition ==
"Mistreated" is the longest track on the album. The song shifts gears and builds to a climax with Blackmore launching into a rapid solo, and Coverdale and Hughes building a wall of multi-tracked backing vocals before the song's end.

== Reception ==
In a retrospective review for AllMusic, Eduardo Rivadavia called "Mistreated" the "fantastic slow-boiling blues", qualifying it for the "highest echelons of hard rock achievement, and therefore ranks as an essential item in the discography of any self-respecting music fan".

== Versions ==
=== Live performances ===
The song stayed in the band's set-list until Blackmore left in April 1975, and a live version was included on the Made in Europe album in 1976. Other live versions can be found on Live in London (1982), Live in Paris 1975 and on the video Live in California 74.

After Deep Purple broke up in 1976, David Coverdale continued performing "Mistreated" with his band Whitesnake (which has also included former Deep Purple members Jon Lord and Ian Paice) until the early 1980s and briefly again in 1997. Live versions of the song are featured on the band's album Live...in the Heart of the City. Whitesnake covered "Mistreated" for the 2015 studio album The Purple Album, which consists entirely of songs Coverdale originally recorded with Deep Purple.

Ritchie Blackmore performed "Mistreated" with his band Rainbow in the late 1970s, the mid-1990s, and during their reformation in 2015. Live versions of the song by Rainbow can be heard on the group's albums On Stage (1977), Live in Germany 1976 and Live in Munich 1977 with Ronnie James Dio on vocals. More recently, Glenn Hughes has performed the song live both as a solo artist (as heard on the album Soulfully Live in the City of Angels) and with the band Black Country Communion.

=== Covers ===
- Dio covered "Mistreated" on the tour for the album Angry Machines in 1996 and 1997. A live version of the song can be found on the album Inferno: Last in Live.
- Swedish guitarist Yngwie Malmsteen covered the song for his 1996 album Inspiration.
- German guitarist Axel Rudi Pell occasionally includes "Mistreated" in his setlists. Cover versions of the song are featured on the albums Made in Germany (1995), Live on Fire (2012) and Magic Moments - 25th Anniversary Special Show (2015).

== Personnel ==
- Ritchie Blackmore – guitar
- David Coverdale – lead vocals
- Glenn Hughes – bass guitar, backing vocals
- Jon Lord – keyboards
- Ian Paice – drums
