= On Stage (Rainbow album) =

Live album by Rainbow
- Released: 7 July 1977 (US); 15 July 1977 (UK)
- Recorded: September and December 1976 in Germany and Japan
- Genres: Hard rock; heavy metal
- Length: 64:11
- Label: Oyster/Polydor
- Producer: Martin Birch

Rainbow live albums chronology
On Stage (1977)	Finyl Vinyl (1986)

Singles from On Stage
- 1. "Kill the King (Live EP)" Released: 2 September 1977

On Stage is a double live album originally released by the British hard rock band Rainbow in 1977. It was recorded live over several German and Japanese dates in late 1976 during the Rising world tour. The album was released first in the US on 7 July 1977, before being released a week later on 15 July in the UK.

== Recording ==
The recording features the customary introduction to a Rainbow show – the classic quote from The Wizard of Oz, "Toto: I have a feeling we're not in Kansas anymore. We must be over the rainbow!" with the last word repeated as an echo, then the actual band plays a musical phrase from the song "Over the Rainbow" before breaking into "Kill the King".

== Release and reception ==
Professional ratings
Review scores
Source	Rating
AllMusic	2/5 stars
Collector's Guide to Heavy Metal	5/10
The Encyclopedia of Popular Music	2/5 stars
Rolling Stone	(unfavorable)

Geoff Ginsberg of AllMusic writes: "On Stage is full of great songs and playing, but somehow it lacks some of the excitement that existed at those early Ritchie Blackmore concerts. The production is just kind of flat. That doesn't change the fact that there is some great stuff to be found here and nowhere else, such as the side-long version of "Mistreated," from Deep Purple's Burn."

The song "Kill the King" appeared on this album before it was recorded for a studio album. A studio version appears on the follow-up release, 1978's Long Live Rock 'n' Roll.

The single "Kill the King", with "Man on the Silver Mountain" and "Mistreated" as double B-sides, was released in the UK in September 1977. This was Rainbow's debut in the UK Singles Chart, peaking at No. 44. After the commercial success of "Since You Been Gone", "All Night Long" and "I Surrender", "Kill the King" was re-released in 1981 this time climbing to No. 41. Songwriter and lead singer Ronnie James Dio claimed that the violent imagery in the song is actually about a chess game.

Another example of a Rainbow concert of the time was the 1991 release Live in Germany 1976, which featured unedited concert performances and includes both tour staple "Stargazer" and the usual encore "Do You Close Your Eyes".

The deluxe edition was released on 13 November 2012 in Europe. The second disc was originally planned to contain tracks from the concert hall at the "Orix Theater" (formerly Osaka Kōsei Nenkin Kaikan) in Osaka, Japan (9 December 1976). Instead the second disc contains tracks from the final Rainbow gig in Tokyo, Japan at the Nippon Budokan Hall on 16 December 1976.

== Track listing ==
Side 1
No.	Title	Writer(s)	Recording source	Length
1.	"Kill the King"	Ritchie Blackmore, Ronnie James Dio, Cozy Powell	Nuremberg 28 September 1976 (first 1:03); Munich 29 September 1976 (remainder of the song)	5:32
2.	"Medley: Man on the Silver Mountain/Blues/Starstruck"	Blackmore, Dio/Blackmore/Blackmore, Dio	Tokyo 16 December 1976 - Afternoon Show ("Man on the Silver Mountain"); Tokyo 16 December 1976 - Evening Show ("Blues" and "Starstruck")	11:12

Side 2
No.	Title	Writer(s)	Recording source	Length
3.	"Catch the Rainbow"	Blackmore, Dio	Osaka 9 December 1976	15:35

Side 3
No.	Title	Writer(s)	Recording source	Length
4.	"Mistreated" (Deep Purple cover)	Blackmore, David Coverdale	Cologne 25 September 1976	13:03

Side 4
No.	Title	Writer(s)	Recording source	Length
5.	"Sixteenth Century Greensleeves"	Blackmore, Dio	Tokyo 16 December 1976 (Evening Show)	7:36
6.	"Still I'm Sad" (The Yardbirds cover)	Paul Samwell-Smith, Jim McCarty	Nuremberg 28 September 1976	11:01

Deluxe Edition Disc 2 (All tracks from Nippon Budokan Hall, 16 December 1976 - Evening Show)
No.	Title	Length
1.	"Kill The King"	5:55
2.	"Mistreated"	12:13
3.	"Sixteenth Century Greensleeves"	8:22
4.	"Catch The Rainbow"	18:14
5.	"Medley: Man On The Silver Mountain/Blues/Starstruck"	16:21
6.	"Do You Close Your Eyes" (Blackmore, Dio)	10:32

== Personnel ==
Rainbow

- Ritchie Blackmore – guitars
- Ronnie James Dio – vocals
- Tony Carey – keyboards, orchestron
- Jimmy Bain – bass
- Cozy Powell – drums

== Charts ==
Chart (1977)	Peak position
Australian Albums (Kent Music Report)	22
Austrian Albums (Ö3 Austria)	15
Dutch Albums (Album Top 100)	17
Finnish Albums (The Official Finnish Charts)	21
German Albums (Offizielle Top 100)	28
Japanese Albums (Oricon)	6
New Zealand Albums (RMNZ)	29
Swedish Albums (Sverigetopplistan)	25
UK Albums (Official Charts)	7
US Billboard 200	65

Chart (2012)	Peak position
UK Rock & Metal Albums (Official Charts)	31

== Certifications ==
Region	Certification	Certified units/sales
Japan (RIAJ)	Gold	100,000
United Kingdom (BPI)	Silver	60,000^{^}
^{^} Shipments figures based on certification alone.
