= Long Live Rock 'n' Roll =

Studio album by Rainbow
- Released: 14 April 1978
- Recorded: May–July and December 1977
- Studios: The Strawberry Studio, Château d'Hérouville, France
- Genres: Hard rock; heavy metal
- Length: 39:48
- Label: Polydor
- Producer: Martin Birch

Rainbow chronology
Rising (1976)	Long Live Rock 'n' Roll (1978)	Down to Earth (1979)

Singles from Long Live Rock 'n' Roll
- 1. "Long Live Rock 'n' Roll" Released: 24 March 1978; 2. "L.A. Connection" Released: 15 September 1978

Long Live Rock 'n' Roll is the third studio album by the British heavy metal band Rainbow, released on 14 April 1978 and the last to feature original lead vocalist Ronnie James Dio.

== Background ==
Recording of the album commenced in April 1977, at a studio in Château d'Hérouville, France, featuring Ritchie Blackmore, Ronnie James Dio and Cozy Powell. Keyboards were initially played on a session basis by former Rainbow keyboardist Tony Carey, while bass guitar was initially played by Mark Clarke. Clarke was soon dismissed, however, and the bass guitar was recorded by Blackmore himself. By July 1977 seven tracks that ended on the album were in demo form. Recording was suspended, while the band recruited bassist Bob Daisley and keyboardist David Stone and thereafter commenced extensive touring of Europe in the summer and autumn of 1977. A return to the Château d'Hérouville studio in December saw the band finish the album and also yielded a final track, "Gates of Babylon".

Although Daisley and Stone are listed on the album credits for their contributions, they joined the band partway through the recording sessions and only appear on three and four songs, respectively. Stone wrote parts of "Gates of Babylon", the middle 8 section during the guitar solo. He was paid for the work, but not credited on the album.

== Artwork ==
The original vinyl release was in a gatefold-sleeve cover illustrated by Debbie Hall, with a lyric-sheet insert. The crowd picture is actually from a Rush concert, with the wording on the banner the fans were holding replaced by the Rainbow album title and the visible Rush T-shirts airbrushed to black.

Original copies of the single "L.A. Connection" were issued on red vinyl and featured aspects of the previous studio album's cover picture on the B-side's label.

== Release and reception ==
Professional ratings
Review scores
Source	Rating
AllMusic	4/5 stars
Collector's Guide to Heavy Metal	9/10
The Encyclopedia of Popular Music	3/5 stars
MusicHound Rock: The Essential Album Guide	2.5/5 stars
The Rolling Stone Record Guide	1/5 stars

Geoff Ginsberg of AllMusic wrote that Long Live Rock 'n' Roll "would turn out to be the last great album Rainbow would ever make, although they did enjoy a great deal of chart success in the post-Dio era."

The album, among other Rainbow releases, is often cited as a strong influence on formation of the power metal genre, especially on its fantasy-themed lyrics and aesthetics.

== Reissues ==
- Long Live Rock 'n' Roll was remastered on CD for the US market in April 1999, with the European version following later. The US version had a matte booklet/insert, which matched the original vinyl sleeve for all markets, whereas the European issue was the standard glossy type.
- Long Live Rock 'n' Roll Story, an album and a book about the making of the LP was released in June 2009 in the "Rock Landmarks" series. The inlay story was written by Jerry Bloom, author of Black Knight, a Ritchie Blackmore's biography.
- On 12 April 2012 a picture disc album version of Long Live Rock 'n' Roll was released in the US as part of Record Store Day 2012.
- A deluxe edition version was released on 13 November in Europe, featuring rough mixes of the album tracks from July 1977 except "Gates of Babylon", which was written later.

== Track listing ==
All tracks are written by Ritchie Blackmore and Ronnie James Dio, except where noted.

Side one
No.	Title	Length
1.	"Long Live Rock 'n' Roll"	4:24
2.	"Lady of the Lake"	3:39
3.	"L.A. Connection"	5:02
4.	"Gates of Babylon"	6:49

Side two
No.	Title	Writer(s)	Length
5.	"Kill the King"	Blackmore, Dio, Cozy Powell	4:29
6.	"The Shed (Subtle)"	Blackmore, Dio, Powell	4:47
7.	"Sensitive to Light"		3:07
8.	"Rainbow Eyes"		7:31

- Track 3 - Many vinyl copies label the song's length as 3:35.

=== 2012 Deluxe Edition ===
Disc one contains the original album with no bonus tracks.

Disc two
No.	Title	Original source	Length
1.	"Lady of the Lake"	Rough mix, 4 July 1977	3:50
2.	"Sensitive to Light"	Rough mix, 4 July 1977	3:03
3.	"L.A. Connection"	Rough mix, 4 July 1977	5:33
4.	"Kill the King"	Rough mix, 4 July 1977	4:27
5.	"The Shed (Subtle)"	Rough mix, 4 July 1977	3:36
6.	"Long Live Rock 'n' Roll"	Rough mix, 4 July 1977	4:19
7.	"Rainbow Eyes"	Rough mix, 4 July 1977	6:55
8.	"Long Live Rock 'n' Roll"	Shepperton Film Studios rehearsal, August 1977	6:56
9.	"Kill the King"	Shepperton Film Studios rehearsal, August 1977	4:42
10.	"Long Live Rock 'n' Roll"	Live on the Don Kirschner Show, May 1978	3:31
11.	"L.A. Connection"	Live on the Don Kirschner Show, May 1978	5:10
12.	"Gates of Babylon"	Live on the Don Kirschner Show, May 1978	6:35
13.	"L.A. Connection"	Outtake from the Don Kirschner Show, May 1978	5:11
14.	"Gates of Babylon"	Outtake from the Don Kirschner Show, May 1978	6:43
Total length:			70:31

- Track 7 - "Rainbow Eyes" is an early version. Tracks 10–14 are pre-recorded with live vocal by Dio.

== Personnel ==
Credits taken from album liner notes.

Rainbow

- Ritchie Blackmore – guitars, bass on tracks 1–3, 6 (also bass on rough mix tracks 1–6, 2012 Deluxe Edition)
- Ronnie James Dio – vocals
- Cozy Powell – drums
- Bob Daisley – bass on tracks 4–5 and 7
- David Stone – keyboards on tracks 4–6, piano outro on track 3
- Tony Carey – keyboards on tracks 1–2 and 8

Additional musicians

- Rainer Pietsch – scoring and conducting on "Gates of Babylon" and "Rainbow Eyes"
- Bavarian String Ensemble – strings on "Gates of Babylon"
- Rudi Risavy – flute on "Rainbow Eyes"
- Max Hecker – recorder on "Rainbow Eyes"

"'Rainbow Eyes' String Quartet":

- Ferenc Kiss – first violin, concert master
- Nico Nicolic – second violin
- Ottmar Machan – viola
- Karl Heinz Feit – cello

Production

- Martin Birch – producer and engineer
- Max Hecker – classical instruments recording engineer
- Bruce Payne – direction
- Recorded at The Strawberry Studio at Château d'Hérouville, France, May–July and December 1977

== Singles ==
- 1978 – "Long Live Rock 'n' Roll / Sensitive to Light"
- 1978 – "L.A. Connection / Lady of the Lake"

These two singles were also re-released in the UK in July 1981. "Long Live Rock 'n' Roll" was also used for many years as a jingle by the British radio DJ Alan Freeman.

== Charts ==
Chart (1977)	Peak position
Australian Albums (Kent Music Report)	43
Canada Top Albums/CDs (RPM)	94
Dutch Albums (Album Top 100)	11
Finnish Albums (The Official Finnish Charts)	14
German Albums (Offizielle Top 100)	26
Japanese Albums (Oricon)	9
Norwegian Albums (VG-lista)	12
Swedish Albums (Sverigetopplistan)	18
UK Albums (Official Charts)	7
US Billboard 200	89

Chart (2012)	Peak position
UK Rock & Metal Albums (Official Charts)	27

Chart (2013)	Peak position
Japanese Albums (Oricon)	72

Chart (2025)	Peak position
Greek Albums (IFPI)	43

== Certifications ==
Region	Certification	Certified units/sales
United Kingdom (BPI)	Silver	60,000^{^}
^{^} Shipments figures based on certification alone.

== Accolades ==
Publication	Country	Accolade	Year	Rank
Record Collector	United Kingdom	"Classic Albums from 21 Genres for the 21st Century"	2000	No order
Classic Rock	United Kingdom	"The 100 Greatest Rock Albums of All Times"	2001	29
Rock Hard	Germany	"Top 300 Albums"	2001	105
