= Ronnie James Dio =

American heavy metal singer (1942–2010)

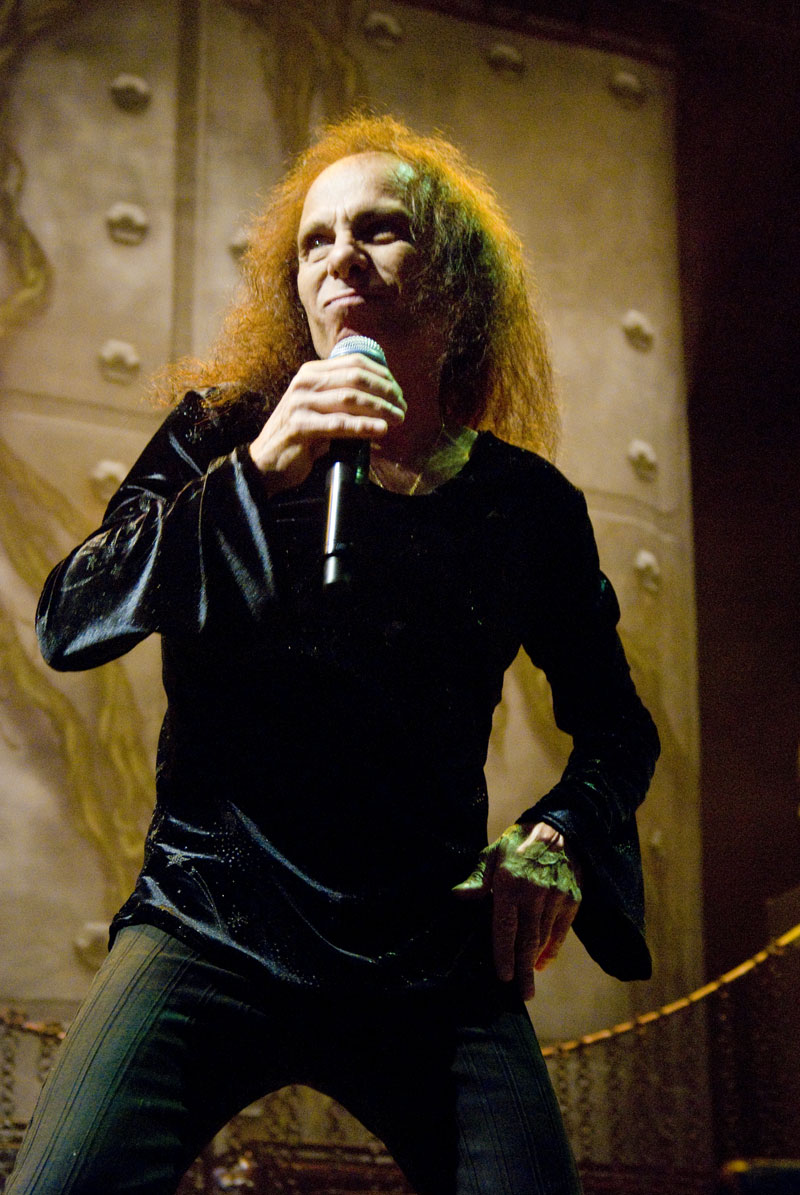
- Dio performing in 2009

Background information
- Born: Ronald James Padavona; July 10, 1942; Portsmouth, New Hampshire, U.S.
- Origin: Cortland, New York, U.S.
- Died: May 16, 2010 (aged 67) Houston, Texas, U.S.
- Genres: Heavy metal; hard rock
- Occupations: Singer; songwriter
- Years active: 1957–2010
- Formerly of: Dio; Black Sabbath; Heaven & Hell; Rainbow; Elf; Hear 'n Aid
- Spouses: Loretta Berardi (m. 1963; div. 1973) Wendy Walters (m. 1978)
- Website: ronniejamesdio.com

Ronald James Padavona (July 10, 1942 – May 16, 2010), known professionally as Ronnie James Dio, was an American heavy metal singer. He fronted numerous bands throughout his career, including Elf, Rainbow, Black Sabbath, Dio and Heaven & Hell.

Dio's music career began in 1957 as part of the Vegas Kings (later Ronnie and the Rumblers). In 1967, he formed the rock band Elf, in which he sang and played bass. In 1975, Deep Purple guitarist Ritchie Blackmore founded the band Rainbow and hired Dio as lead singer; during his tenure, the band released three studio albums. Dio quickly emerged as one of heavy rock's pre-eminent vocalists. In 1979, Dio replaced Ozzy Osbourne as Black Sabbath's lead singer and appeared on three studio albums with the band, all three of which met with success: Heaven & Hell (1980), Mob Rules (1981) and Dehumanizer (1992). In 1982, he left to form the band Dio, which itself had two albums certified platinum by the RIAA. In 2006, he founded the band Heaven & Hell with his prior Black Sabbath bandmates Tony Iommi, Geezer Butler, and Vinny Appice. In November 2009, Dio was diagnosed with stomach cancer and died of the disease six months later.

Dio is regarded as one of the greatest and most influential heavy metal vocalists of all time. He is known for popularizing the "devil horns" hand gesture in metal culture and his medieval-themed song lyrics. According to a version provided by the singer himself, the act derives directly from the classic Italian apotropaic gesture, which his grandmother often displayed. Dio had a powerful, versatile vocal range and was capable of singing both hard rock and lighter ballads. He was awarded the "Metal Guru Award" by Classic Rock Magazine in 2006. He was also named the "Best Metal Singer" at the Revolver Golden Gods Awards in 2010 and ranked as the genre's best vocalist in 2013 by music journalist Sacha Jenkins.

== Early life ==
Ronnie James "Dio" Padavona was born in Portsmouth, New Hampshire, to Italian-American parents Patrick and Anna Padavona from Cortland, New York. The original Italian toponymic surname was 'Padovano' (meaning 'from Padua') but it was miswritten at Ellis Island when his grandfather came from Italy. His family moved to Portsmouth from Cortland as part of his father's service in the U.S. Army during World War II, and they resided there for only a short time before returning to Cortland.

Padavona listened to a great deal of opera while growing up and was influenced vocally by American tenor Mario Lanza. His first formal musical training began at age 5, learning to play the trumpet. It was during high school that Padavona formed his first rock 'n' roll group, The Vegas Kings, which would later be named Ronnie and the Rumblers and then Ronnie and the Red Caps.

Though Padavona began his rock 'n' roll career on trumpet, he added singing to his skill set and also assumed bass guitar duties for the groups. Besides music Padavona also enjoyed romantic fantasy literature, specifically the works of Sir Walter Scott and the Arthurian legend. He also enjoyed science fiction and sports.

Padavona graduated from Cortland High School in 1960. He was allegedly offered a scholarship to the prestigious Juilliard School of Music but did not take up the offer due to his interest in rock music. He instead attended the State University of New York (SUNY) at Buffalo to major in pharmacology. There, he played trumpet in the university's concert band; however, he only attended the university from 1960 to 1961 and did not graduate. Then he enrolled at Cortland State College but dropped out as well. In a 2000 interview, he stated that he majored in history and minored in English.

Despite being known for his powerful singing voice, Padavona claimed to have never received any vocal training. He instead attributed his singing ability to the use of breathing techniques he learned while playing trumpet.

== Career ==
=== Early career ===
Dio's musical career began in 1957, when he and several Cortland, New York, musicians formed the band The Vegas Kings. The group's lineup consisted of Dio on bass guitar, Billy DeWolfe on lead vocals, Nick Pantas on guitar, Tom Rogers on drums and Jack Musci on saxophone. The band changed its name to Ronnie and the Rumblers. In 1958, the band again changed its name to Ronnie and the Redcaps. Musci left the band in 1960 and a new guitarist, Dick Botoff, joined the lineup. The band released two singles: The first single was "Conquest"/"Lover" with the A-side being an instrumental track reminiscent of the Ventures and the B-side featuring DeWolfe on lead vocals. The second was "An Angel Is Missing"/"What'd I Say" featuring Dio on lead vocals for both tracks.

Explanations vary for how Padavona adopted the stage name "Dio". One is that Padavona's grandmother said he had a gift from God and should be called "Dio" ("God" in Italian), although this was disputed by Padavona's widow, Wendy, in a February 2017 interview. Another is that Dio was a reference to mafia member Johnny Dio; this explanation was confirmed in his autobiography. Padavona first used the name on a recording in 1960, when he added it to the band's second release on Seneca. Soon after that, the band modified its name to Ronnie Dio and the Prophets. The Prophets lineup lasted for several years, touring throughout New York and playing college fraternity parties. They produced one single for Atlantic Records and one album. Some of the singles (such as "Mr. Misery", released on Swan) were labeled as being by Ronnie Dio as a solo artist, even if the rest of the Prophets contributed to the recording. The group released several singles during the following years until early 1967. Dio continued to use his birth name on any songwriting credits on those releases.

In late 1967, Ronnie Dio and the Prophets transformed into a new band called the Electric Elves and added a keyboard player. In February 1968, the band was involved in a fatal car accident that killed guitarist Nick Pantas and briefly put Dio and the other band members in hospital. Following the accident, the group shortened its name to the Elves and used that name until mid-1972, when it released its first proper album under the name Elf. Over the next few years, the group went on to become a regular opening act for Deep Purple. Elf recorded three albums until the members' involvement in recording the first Rainbow album in early 1975, resulting in Elf disbanding.

=== Rainbow ===
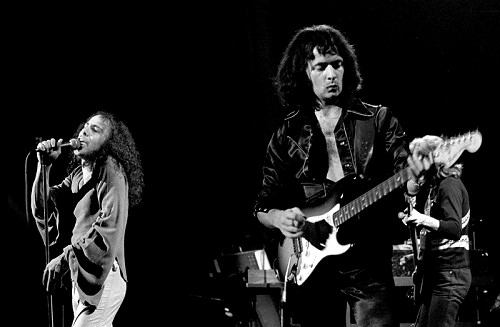
Dio (left) and Ritchie Blackmore performing with Rainbow in 1977

In the mid-1970s, Dio's vocals caught the ear of Deep Purple guitarist Ritchie Blackmore, who was planning on leaving Deep Purple because of creative differences over the band's new direction. Blackmore invited Dio, along with Gary Driscoll, to record two songs in Tampa, Florida, on December 12, 1974. Blackmore stated in 1983, "I left Deep Purple because I'd met up with Ronnie Dio, and he was so easy to work with. He was originally just going to do one track of a solo LP, but we ended up doing the whole LP in three weeks, which I was very excited about." Being satisfied with the results, Blackmore decided to recruit more of Elf's musicians and form his own band, initially known as Ritchie Blackmore's Rainbow. They released the self-titled debut album Ritchie Blackmore's Rainbow in early 1975. After that, Dio recorded two more studio albums Rising (1976) and Long Live Rock 'n' Roll (1978), the live album On Stage and two archival live albums – (Live in Munich 1977 and Live in Germany 1976) – with Blackmore. During his tenure with Rainbow, Dio and Blackmore were the only constant members. Dio is credited on those albums for all lyrical authorship as well as collaboration with Blackmore on musical arrangement. Dio and Blackmore split, with Blackmore taking the band in a more commercial direction, with Graham Bonnet on vocals and the album Down to Earth.

=== Black Sabbath ===
Following his departure from Rainbow in 1979, Dio joined Black Sabbath, replacing the fired Ozzy Osbourne. Dio met Sabbath guitarist Tony Iommi by chance at the Rainbow on Sunset Strip in Los Angeles in 1979. The two musicians were in similar situations, as Dio was seeking a new project and Iommi needed a vocalist. Dio said of the encounter, "It must have been fate, because we connected so instantly." The pair kept in touch until Dio arrived at Iommi's Los Angeles house for a relaxed, getting-to-know-you jam session. On that first day, the duo wrote the song "Children of the Sea," which appeared on the Heaven and Hell album, the first the band recorded with Dio as its vocalist, being released in 1980.

The follow-up album, Mob Rules (1981), featured new drummer Vinny Appice. Personality conflicts began emerging within the band. "Ronnie came into the band and he was doing whatever we told him, basically because he wanted the gig. The next album was a little different," Iommi recalled. In 1982, conflict arose over the mixing of the Live Evil album. Iommi asserted that the album's engineer began complaining to him that he would work all day long on a mix, only to have Dio return to the studio at night to "do his own mix" in which his vocals were more prominent. This was denied by Dio. The conflict led to Dio and Appice ultimately quitting the band later that year.

In 1991, Dio returned to Black Sabbath to record the Dehumanizer album. The album was a minor hit, reaching the Top 40 in the United Kingdom and No. 44 on the US Billboard 200. The single "Time Machine" was featured in the movie Wayne's World, the tenth highest-grossing film of 1992. Close to the end of 1992, Dio and Appice again left the band, citing an inability to work with Iommi and Butler.

=== Dio ===
Wanting to continue together as a band, Dio and Appice formed the eponymous heavy metal band Dio in 1982. Vivian Campbell played guitar and Jimmy Bain played bass, the latter of whom Dio had known since his time with Rainbow. Their 1983 debut album, Holy Diver, included the hit singles "Rainbow in the Dark" and "Holy Diver", which have remained the band's signature songs.

The band added keyboardist Claude Schnell and recorded two more full-length studio albums with this lineup, The Last in Line (1984) and Sacred Heart (1985). A 1984 live recording, A Special from the Spectrum, was filmed during the band's second world tour and released in VHS format only. The band changed members over the years, eventually leaving Dio as the only original member in 1990. Except for a few breaks, the band was constantly touring or recording. They released 10 albums, with Master of the Moon being the last one, recorded in 2004.

=== Heaven & Hell ===
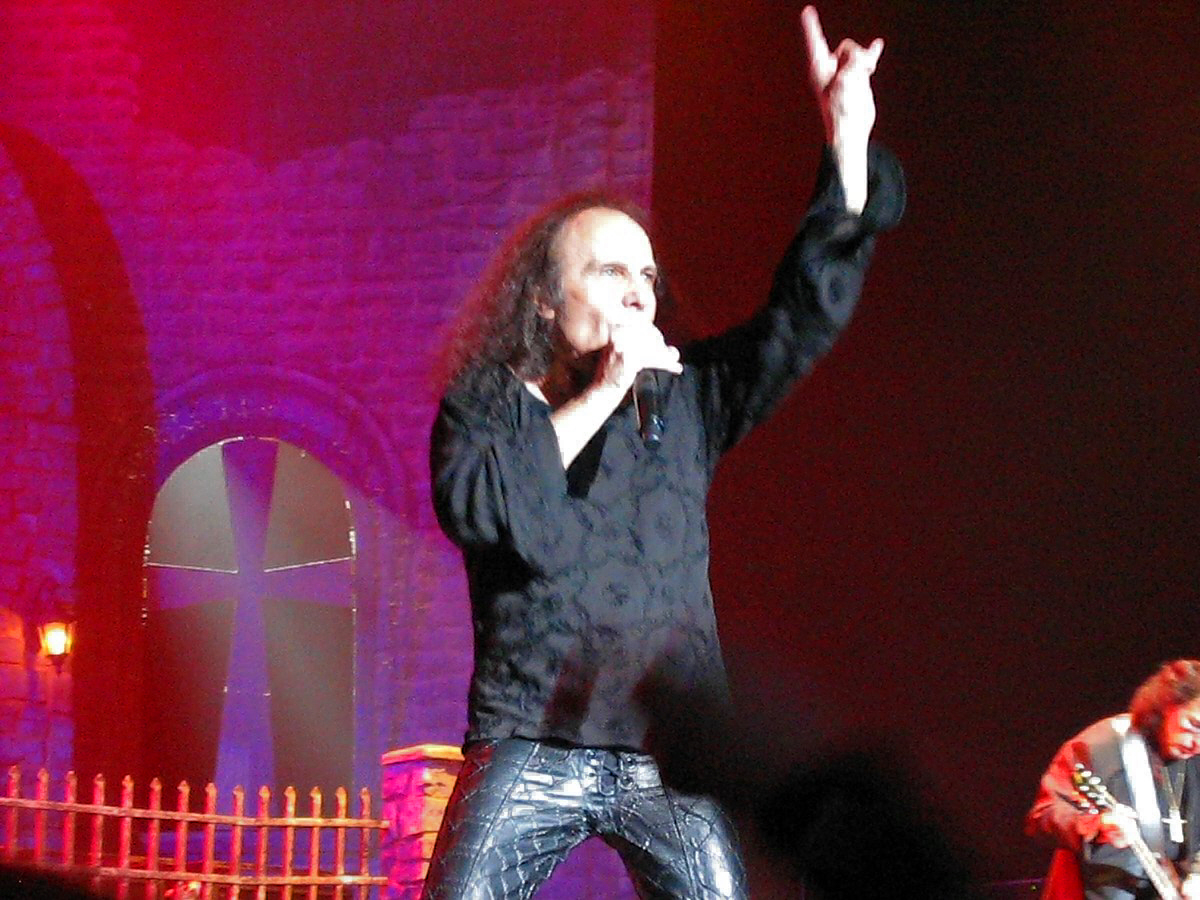
Dio "throwing horns", a gesture commonly used by both artists and fans of heavy metal music

In October 2006, Dio joined Black Sabbath members Tony Iommi, Geezer Butler and former Black Sabbath drummer Vinny Appice to tour under the moniker Heaven & Hell, the title of the first Dio-era Black Sabbath album. They chose the name Heaven & Hell as Iommi and Butler were still in Black Sabbath with Osbourne and felt it was best to use a different moniker for the Dio version of the band. Original Black Sabbath drummer Bill Ward was to be involved in this project, but later withdrew.

In 2007, the band recorded three new songs under the Black Sabbath name for the compilation album Black Sabbath: The Dio Years.

In 2008, the band completed a 98-date world tour. The band released one album under the Heaven & Hell name, The Devil You Know, to critical and commercial acclaim. They also had planned to release a follow-up in 2010.

=== Other projects ===
In 1974, Dio sang on the Roger Glover conducted and produced concept album The Butterfly Ball and the Grasshopper's Feast. Along with other guest-singers, the album featured Deep Purple alumni Glenn Hughes and David Coverdale. Dio provided vocals for the songs "Homeward", "Sitting in a Dream" and the UK single "Love Is All".

In 1980, Dio made vocal contributions to Kerry Livgren's Christian themed progressive rock album Seeds of Change, where he sang on the tracks "Live For the King" and "The Mask of the Great Deceiver."

In 1985, Dio contributed to the metal world's answer to Band Aid and USA for Africa with the Hear 'n Aid project. With a heavy metal all-star ensemble—the brainchild of his fellow Dio bandmates Campbell and Bain—he sang some of the vocals on the single "Stars" and an album full of songs from other artists given to charity. The project raised $1 million within a year.

In 1997, Dio made a cameo on Pat Boone's In a Metal Mood: No More Mr. Nice Guy, an album of famous heavy metal songs played in big band style. Dio can be heard singing backup on Boone's take of "Holy Diver".

In 1999, he was parodied in the TV show South Park, in the episode "Hooked on Monkey Fonics", which he later described as "wonderful."

Tenacious D included a tribute song entitled "Dio" that appeared on their self-titled album. The song explains how he has to "pass the torch" for a new generation. Reportedly, Dio approved of it and had Tenacious D appear in his video "Push" from Killing the Dragon in 2002. He also appeared in the film Tenacious D in The Pick of Destiny, playing himself and providing guest vocals in the movie's opening musical number "Kickapoo."

In 2005, Dio was revealed to be the voice behind Dr. X in Operation: Mindcrime II, the sequel to Queensrÿche's seminal concept album Operation: Mindcrime. His part was shown in a prerecorded video on the subsequent tour and Dio appeared onstage to sing the part live on at least one occasion (both shown on the Mindcrime at the Moore DVD).

Though he was unable to finish writing it, Dio's autobiography, titled Rainbow in the Dark: The Autobiography, was completed by Wendy Dio and Mick Wall and published posthumously on July 27, 2021.

A documentary about Dio's life titled DIO: Dreamers Never Die premiered at SXSW on March 21, 2022. The film received a limited theatrical release on September 28, and premiered on television on Showtime December 1, 2022.

== Influences and musical style ==
Even though he was born and raised in America, Dio was heavily influenced by British acts, in a 2005 interview he stated “Those who influenced me were Deep Purple and Led Zeppelin. Mainly English bands of that era. But especially Purple and Zeppelin. That’s what made me want to do this more and more, and more. Because the first band I was in back then, ELF, were much more a kind of honky tonk rock ‘n’ roll band.”

Dio’s singing style has been described as operatic, powerful and emotional, possessing a deep vocal range he was capable of singing both hard rock and lighter ballads. His lyrics often revolved around fantasy, mythology, heroes vs. evil, and cosmic struggle. He has also been credited for bringing intellectual depth and imaginative storytelling to metal, showing that heavy music could be thoughtful and poetic. He was also known for his performances during live shows.

== Personal life ==
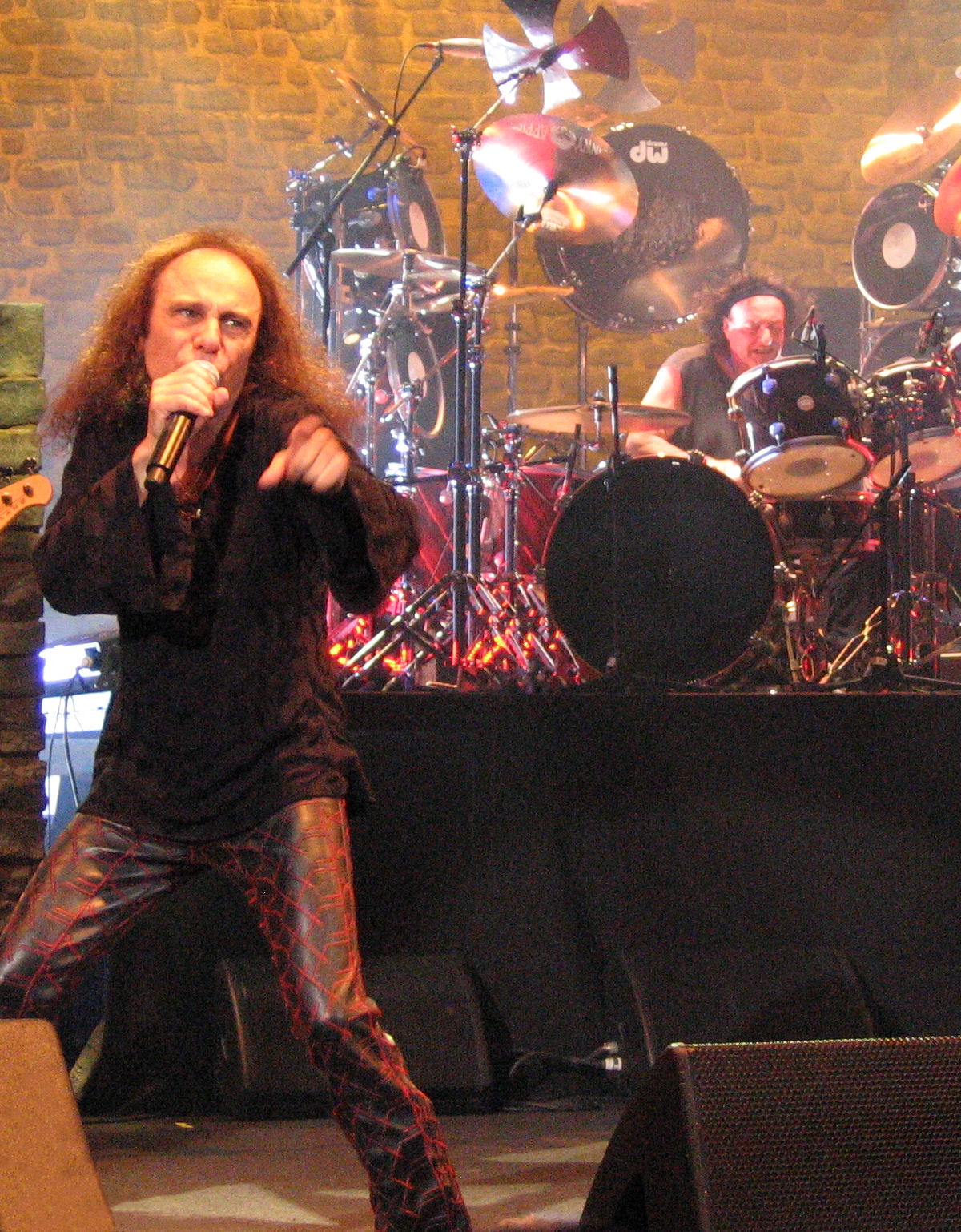
Dio and drummer Vinny Appice performing with Heaven & Hell in Katowice, Poland, in June 2007

Dio married his first wife Loretta Berardi (born 1941) in 1963. They adopted a son but divorced in 1972.

In 1978, Dio married Wendy Walters (born 1945), ex-wife of drummer Aynsley Dunbar and guitarist Ricardo Gaxiola. She also served as Dio's manager. In the 1980s, she managed various rock bands, including Rough Cutt and Hellion. The couple separated but did not divorce.

In September 2003, Dio accidentally severed his thumb during a gardening accident when a heavy garden gnome fell onto it. Dio was concerned he would no longer be able to do his signature "devil's horns" hand gesture, but a doctor managed to re-attach it.

== Illness and death ==
On November 25, 2009, Dio announced that he was diagnosed with stomach cancer and underwent treatment at the MD Anderson Cancer Center in Houston, Texas.

On May 4, 2010, Heaven & Hell announced they were canceling all summer dates as a result of Dio's health condition. His last live performance was with Heaven & Hell on August 29, 2009, in Atlantic City, New Jersey. Dio died of the illness on May 16, 2010.

Following his death many tributes poured in from fellow musicians, Metallica drummer Lars Ulrich took to Metallica.com to write a tribute reading "Ronnie, your voice impacted and empowered me, your music inspired and influenced me, and your kindness touched and moved me. Thank you." Slipknot vocalist Corey Taylor stated "Ronnie sang like he lived - all out, from the heart, with so much honesty and joy." Killswitch Engage who covered his song "Holy Diver" added "He is truly a musician's musician; a model for the new school to aspire towards."

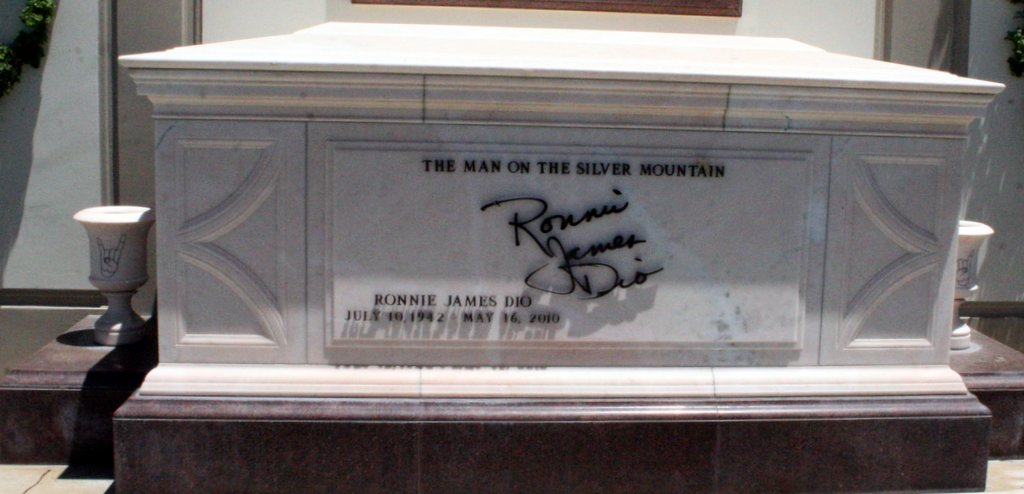
The tomb of Dio

Two weeks after his death, a public memorial service was held at The Hall of Liberty, Forest Lawn Hollywood Hills, Los Angeles. The hall was filled to capacity, with many more fans sitting outside the hall watching the memorial on multiple giant screens on both the east and south sides of the hall. Friends, family, and former and current bandmates of Dio, including Rudy Sarzo, Geoff Tate, John Payne, Glenn Hughes, Joey Belladonna and Heaven & Hell keyboard player, Scott Warren, gave speeches and performed. On the screen was an accompanying documentary covering Dio's career from his early days with Elf to his final project with Heaven & Hell.

== Legacy and popular culture ==
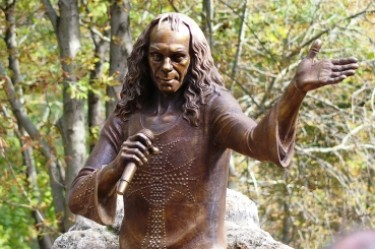
A tribute monument of Dio in Kavarna, Bulgaria

Dio's career spanned more than 50 years. During this period and particularly in the 21st century, he received a number of distinctions and awards. He was inducted into the Cortland City Hall of Fame in 2004 and has a street named after him there called Dio Way. Classic Rock Magazine awarded Dio the "Metal Guru Award" at their yearly "Roll of Honour" awards ceremony in 2006. On January 17, 2007, Dio was inducted into Guitar Center's Rock Walk of Fame in Hollywood. Dio was named "Best Metal Singer" at the Revolver Golden Gods Awards in April 2010 for his work on The Devil You Know, making him the oldest recipient of this award at age 67. He accepted the award in person at what would be his final public appearance, just one month before his death.

The main stage of Bloodstock Open Air is also named after him in tribute after Heaven & Hell pulled out upon his death. Also, the main stage on Masters of Rock festival carries his name since summer 2010. A Dio monument has been unveiled in Kavarna, Bulgaria. In Mexico the biggest metal fest was named "Hell and Heaven" in honor of Dio; the organization says that the festival was named that way since they had worked with Dio, referring to him as "the greatest singer and person we ever had worked with, a really humble person."

Rolling Stone magazine eulogized Dio with these words: "It wasn't just his mighty pipes that made him Ronnie James Dio — it was his moral fervor...what always stood out was Dio's raging compassion for the lost rock & roll children in his audience. Dio never pretended to be one of the kids — he sang as an adult assuring us that we weren't alone in our suffering, and some day we might even be proud of conquering it." In 2023, Rolling Stone ranked Dio at number 165 on its list of the 200 Greatest Singers of All Time. He also ranked 10th on Hit Parader's 2008, list of the "Top 100 Metal Vocalists of All Time".

Dio had a heavy influence on the metal genre and many vocalists have described him as an influence such as Russell Allen, Michael Kiske, Tim “Ripper” Owens, Mike Baker, Phil Anselmo, Joseph Michael, Melissa VanFleet, Bruce Dickinson and Rob Halford. Anthropologist Sam Dunn traced the origins of power metal back to the late 1970s, and credited Dio for laying down the groundwork for power metals lyrical style. The fantasy-oriented lyrics he wrote for Rainbow, concentrated around medieval, renaissance, folk, and science fiction themes, directly influenced modern power metal bands. Eric Adams the lead singer of Manowar called Dio “the first god of metal”

On December 25, 1985, a star was named after Dio.

Following his death his widow Wendy started The Ronnie James Dio Stand Up And Shout Cancer Fund in his memory. The charity holds multiple events throughout the year and used to hold an annual awards gala which took place in California. Since its inception the charity has raised over $2.5 million.

On July 10, 2011, in parallel to Dio's birthday, his hometown of Cortland, New York held a day-long event featuring many central New York local bands and talent for a benefit to the Stand Up and Shout Cancer foundation for cancer research and Dio Memorial concert. Part of the proceeds from the event went to fund a memorial music scholarship for the local city high-school in his name.

On March 31, 2014, the tribute album Ronnie James Dio This Is Your Life was released. It was organized and produced by Wendy Gaxiola, with album proceeds benefitting the Ronnie James Dio Stand Up and Shout Cancer Fund.

On August 6, 2016, a hologram of the singer, created by Eyellusion, made its live debut at the Wacken Open Air Festival. A second hologram was created for a subsequent world tour, which began on December 6, 2017, in Bochum, Germany. In 2016, Loudwire ranked Dio the 5th greatest Hard / Metal Frontman of all time. In a 2013, tournament held by the same publication Dio was voted the greatest metal frontman of all time beating out Rob Halford in the final round.

On January 18, 2017, Dio was inducted into the Hall of Heavy Metal History, now known as the Metal Hall of Fame.

"I guess if I've left any kind of legacy", Dio remarked in 1987, "it's been Heaven and Hell and a lot of Rainbow Rising."

JoJo's Bizarre Adventure's main villain, Dio Brando, gets his name from a combination of Dio and Marlon Brando's surnames.

In the fourth season of television series Stranger Things, character Eddie Munson wears a denim vest that includes a large back panel of the artwork on the cover of Dio's The Last in Line.

== Awards and honors ==
Year	Award	Category	Result	Ref.
1985	Hit Parade	Vocalist of the Year	Won	
1988	The Children of the Night	Philanthropist of the Year	Won	
2006	Classic Rock Roll of Honour Awards	Metal Guru	Won	
2009	BURRN!	Best Male Vocalist	Won	
2010	Classic Rock Roll of Honour Awards	Tommy Vance Inspiration Award	Won	
2010	Revolver Golden Gods Awards	Best Vocalist	Won	
2010	Kerrang! Awards	Icon Award	Won	
2014	Syracuse Area Music Hall of Fame	Lifetime Achievement	Won	

=== Halls of Fame ===
- Cortland City Hall of Fame (class of 2004)
- Hollywood Rock Walk of Fame (2007)
- The Ultimate Classic Rock Hall of Fame (class of 2014)
- The Metal Hall of Fame (inaugural class 2017)

=== Other honors ===
- Street titled “Dio Way” located in Cortland New York
- Bronze statue built in his honor in Kavarna, Bulgaria
- The MainStage of Bloodstock Open Air is named in his honor
- Voted #1 Greatest Heavy Metal Singer by The Encyclopedia of Heavy Metal in 2003
- Named the best metal vocalist of all time by Sacha Jenkins in 2013

== Sources ==
- Pillsbury, Glenn (2013). "Dio's Lost Decade: Recovering the 1960s Career of Ronnie James Dio". Retrieved from http://www.peteofthestreet.net/dioslostdecaden
