= Kolb (surname) =

The surname Kolb originates from the Middle High German "kolbe", with various meanings. The main sense is a mace – a heavy medieval war club with a spiked or flanged metal head, used to crush armor, or a cudgel – a short heavy club with a rounded head used as a weapon and part of an official’s insignia. It may also be a house name – there is a record of a house named Zum Kolben in Strasbourg.

- Abram Bowman Kolb (1862–1925), Canadian teacher and publisher
- Adrienne Kolb, American historian of science, married to Edward
- Alexander Kolb (1891–1963), German general
- Alphonse A. Kolb (1893–1983), German-American artist
- Annette Kolb (1870–1967), German pacifist
- Barbara Kolb (1939–2024), U.S. composer
- Brandon Kolb (born 1973), U.S. baseball player
- Brian Kolb (born 1952), U.S. politician
- Bubba Kolb (born 1940), jazz pianist
- Carol Kolb (unknown), U.S. comedy writer
- Chris Kolb (1958), U.S. politician
- Clarence Kolb (1874–1964), U.S. vaudeville performer
- Claudia Kolb (born 1949), U.S. swimmer
- Dan Kolb (born 1975), U.S. baseball player
- David Kolb (born 1941), U.S. philosopher
- David A. Kolb (born 1939), U.S. educationist
- Eberhard Kolb (born 1933), historian
- Edward Kolb (born 1951), American cosmologist, married to Adrienne
- Eugen Kolb (1898–1959), art critic
- Frank Kolb (1945–2026), German historian
- Franz Kolb (unknown), German inventor
- Gary Kolb (1940–2019), U.S. baseball player
- John Kolb, American politician
- Jon Kolb (born 1947), U.S. football player
- Kevin Kolb (born 1984), U.S. football player
- Larry J. Kolb (born 1953), U.S. CIA operative and writer
- Lawrence Kolb (1911–2006), U.S. psychiatrist
- Ophélia Kolb (born 1982), French actress
- Michael J. Kolb (born c. 1960s), U.S. archaeologist
- Robert Kolb (born c. 1940), U.S. theologian, systematician
- Roberto Kolb Neuhaus (born 1951), Mexican musicologist and oboist
- Steven Kolb, American businessman
- Thomas Kolb, American radiologist
- Ute Kolb (born 1963), German crystallographer

== See also ==
- Kolbe
- Kulp (surname)
- Culp
