= Kulp =

Kulp may refer to:

== Places ==
- Kulp, Turkey, Ottoman Qulb, in Diyarbakır Province, Turkey
- Tuzluca, Kurdish Qulp, currently in Iğdır Province (Kars province prior to 1993), Turkey

== Other uses ==
- Kulp (surname)
- Kulp (band), Turkish
- KULP, radio station in El Campo, Texas

== See also ==
- Culp
