= Kolb =

Kolb may refer to:

- Kolb (surname), a German surname
- Kolb, Wisconsin, United States, an unincorporated community
- Kolb Aircraft Company, an American aircraft manufacturer
- Kolb Studio, a historic structure in Grand Canyon Village, Arizona, United States
- Banque Kolb, a French bank within retail banking network Crédit du Nord
