= Kolve =

Kolve is a Norwegian surname. Notable people with the surname include:

- Ivar Kolve (born 1967), Norwegian jazz musician, brother of Kåre
- Kåre Kolve (born 1964), Norwegian saxophonist
- Verdel Kolve (born 1934), American English professor

== See also ==
- Kolbe
