= Jews Praying in the Synagogue on Yom Kippur =

1878 painting by Maurycy Gottlieb

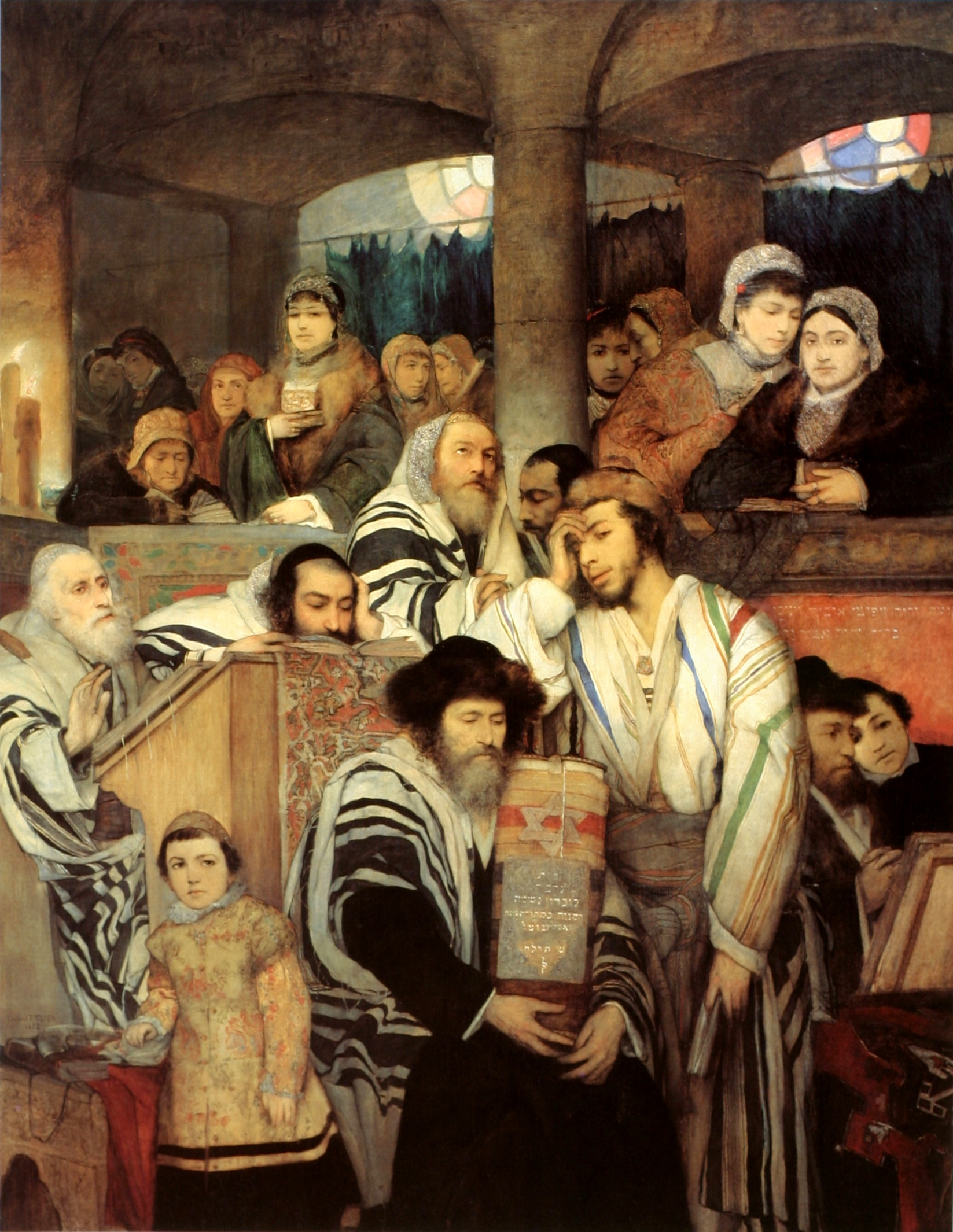
- Artist: Maurycy Gottlieb
- Year: 1878
- Medium: Oil on canvas
- Dimensions: 243 cm × 190 cm (96 in × 75 in)
- Location: Tel Aviv Museum of Art, Tel Aviv

Jews Praying in the Synagogue on Yom Kippur is a painting by Polish-Jewish artist Maurycy Gottlieb in 1878. It depicts Jews in the middle of the Yom Kippur service, the holiest day of the Jewish calendar.

Yom Kippur is the Jewish holiday of repentance, a time for Jews to repent for their sins and reflect on their behaviour in the past and the coming year. As Soussloff writes in Jewish Identity in Modern Art History, "Yom Kippur is also the occasion in the Jewish year when the dead are solemnly commemorated (in the service called Yizkor), and Gottlieb has injected into this picture several prominent self-memorials." In his book Painting a People, Ezra Mendelsohn confirms this: "Nathan Samuely, who discussed the work with Gottlieb in 1878, does specifically connect it, in his German essay on the artist published in 1885, with Yom Kippur, and informs us that the artist himself had the idea of painting it during the days of repentance preceding this holiday."

The painting is composed of glazed (semi-transparent) oil paint. Gottlieb used the technique of impasto (wide, three-dimensional brushstrokes), and physically created patterns from the paint. This contributes to the painting's richness and depth.

== Content ==
The figures in the painting appear solemn, and some appear to be in anguish, particularly the central figure (the artist himself), leaning his head on his hand. The adult men are wearing tallitot (ritual garments often referred to in English as prayer shawls) and kippot (head coverings). There is a Torah scroll in the center of the composition, stained glass windows in the back, and candles on the top left. Women look on from the women's balcony; it has been suggested that one of the women is a depiction of Laura Henschel-Rosenfeld, the artist's fiancée.

The artist Maurycy Gottlieb appears in the painting three different times, depicted in different stages of his life. In one self-portrait, he is an adult, in another he is a young child, and in the third self-portrait he is depicted as an adolescent. Ezra Mendelsohn writes, "Maurycy himself stands, in a colorful, exotic-looking talith, with head in hand. On the left, we have the artist as a small boy, wearing a medallion with his initials written in Hebrew. On the extreme right is a young male figure, perhaps again Maurycy, reading from the prayer book alongside a man who might well be his father. Malinowski assumes that this is the case when he says that the painting presents 'an account of [the artist's] whole life'."

It has been suggested that the artist placed his fiancée Laura among the female worshippers, at the right of the column, whispering to another woman (perhaps her mother), and to the left of the column, holding a prayerbook in hand. In the painting, many of the figures are people who are close to Gottlieb or people he knew at the time. As said by the Tel Aviv Museum of Art, Maurycy Gottlieb created this work of art at the young age of 22 years old; a year later, Gottlieb was dead.

== Themes and motifs ==
There are many characteristics that create a somber tone within this painting. Author Jonathan Boyarin described motifs present in the image as "sadness, nostalgia, and beautification. There is no religious ecstasy, no intensity of emotion, only a pervasive melancholy." The holiday of Yom Kippur is a solemn holiday when it is said that the Book of Life is sealed, and the fates of all those living are decided for the coming year. Certainly, this aspect of the occasion would contribute to the sobriety of its depiction.

The somber character of the painting may also reflect the time in which it was painted. During the late 19th century, Jews in what is now Ukraine were living under the auspices of the Russian Empire, in the Pale of Settlement. Antisemitic discrimination was systemic and ever-present, and pogroms and expulsions occurred. Living under this regime in a time of deep antisemitic discrimination and political instability may have had a major impact on Gottlieb's work.

However, the painting may also evoke the anguish Gottlieb experienced in his personal life. Gottlieb may have suffered from depression, and in fact referenced his own suicide in the painting. The mantle of the Torah scroll is inscribed with a Hebrew dedication: "... donated in memory of ... R. Moshe [Maurycy’s Hebrew name] Gottlieb, the righteous of blessed memory." A year after the painting's completion, the aforementioned Laura married another man, breaking her engagement with Gottlieb. He became ill and died shortly thereafter; some believe as a result of physical ailment, but others suspect it was death by suicide due to deep depression.

== See also ==
- Jewish art
- Art in Tel Aviv
- Tel Aviv Museum of Art
