= Psychonaut (disambiguation) =

A psychonaut is a person who explores the psyche by altering their state of consciousness, often through the practice of meditation or the use of psychoactive substances.

Psychonaut may also refer to:

== Film and television ==
- Psychonaut (film), a 2024 Dutch film
- Psiconautas, an Argentine television series
- Birdboy: The Forgotten Children, or Psychonauts, the Forgotten Children, a 2015 Spanish animated film

== Music ==
- Psychonauts (band), a British trip hop duo
- Psychonaut (album), a 1972 album by Brainticket
- "Psychonaut", a song by Fields of the Nephilim from the 1991 album Earth Inferno
- Psychonaut Records, a record label founded by the Dutch band the Gathering

== Other uses ==
- Psychonauts, a 2005 video game
  - Psychonauts 2, a 2021 video game
- Psychonaut, a 1982 book by Peter J. Carroll
- Psychonauts, an Epic Comics limited series

== See also ==
- Oneironaut, a person who consciously travels within a dream
