= Cottonwoodhill =

Studio album by Brainticket
- Released: 1971
- Genre: Krautrock, psychedelic rock, experimental rock
- Length: 34:20
- Label: Bellaphon; Hallelujah
- Producer: Hellmuth Kolbe

Brainticket chronology
Cottonwoodhill (1971)	Psychonaut (1971)

Professional ratings
Review scores
Source	Rating
Allmusic	4.5/5 stars

Cottonwoodhill is the debut album by Brainticket.

The LP's original inner sleeve warns: "After Listening to this Record, your friends may not know you anymore" and "Only listen to this once a day. Your brain might be destroyed!"

== Track listing ==
1. "Black Sand" (Ron Bryer, Joel Vandroogenbroeck) – 4:05
2. "Places of Light" (Bryer, Dawn Muir, Vandroogenroeck) – 4:05
3. "Brainticket, Pt. 1" (Bryer, Kolbe, Muir, Vandroogenbroeck) – 8:21
4. "Brainticket, Pt. 1: Conclusion" (Bryer, Kolbe, Muir, Vandroogenbroeck) – 4:36
5. "Brainticket, Pt. 2" (Bryer, Kolbe, Muir, Vandroogenbroeck) – 13:13

== Personnel ==
Credits adapted from Discogs

Brainticket

- Dawn Muir – vocals
- Ron Bryer – guitar
- Hellmuth Kolbe – potentiometers, generators, sound effects
- Joel Vandroogenbroeck – organ, flute
- Werner Frohlich – bass
- Cosimo Lampis – drums
- Wolfgang Paap – tablas

Technical

- Hellmuth Kolbe – producer, engineer, electronics, supervisor, generator
- Elso Schiavo – artwork
- Robert Lattmann – assistant engineer
- Heinz Walti – cover photo photography
