= Laura Henschel-Rosenfeld =

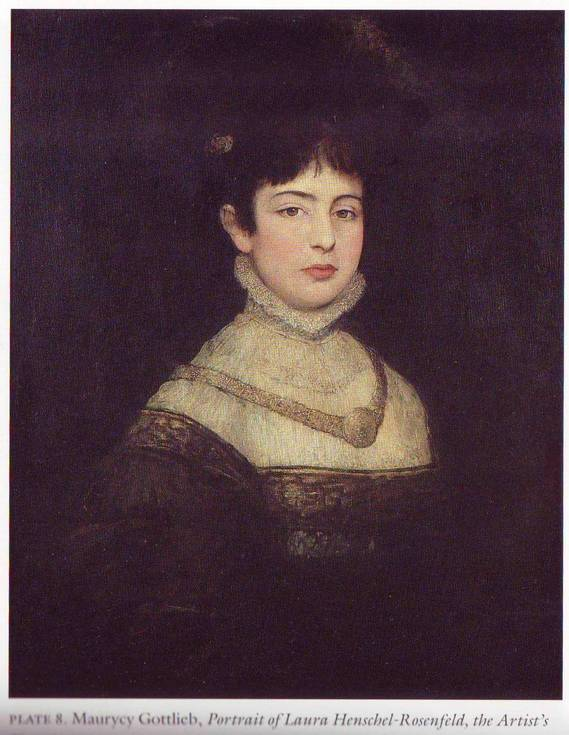
- Portrait of Laura by Gottlieb, 1877
- Born: December 25, 1857; Brno, Moravia, Kingdom of Bohemia
- Died: April 1944 (aged 86); Auschwitz-Birkenau, occupied Poland

Laura Henschel-Rosenfeld (25 December 1857 – April 1944), was a Jewish Czech educator, writer, and fiancée of Maurycy Gottlieb, until she rejected him for another suitor. Henschel-Rosenfeld appears in some of Gottlieb's most famous paintings.

== Early life ==
Rosenfeld was born on 25 December 1857 to Joseph Rosenfeld and Rosa Kolisch in Brno, the capital of Moravia. She was the youngest of 11 children.

Rosenfeld attended a convent school in Lienz, Upper Austria, and then another near Geneva for three years. Despite her surroundings, she continued to maintain the Jewish faith instilled in her by her mother. After her father died, her widowed mother moved with her to Vienna, where she was to have her first encounter with Maurycy Gottlieb probably in 1875 or 1876.

== Relationship with Maurycy Gottlieb ==
Maurycy Gottlieb was smitten by Rosenfeld, and soon proposed to her. She accepted, and became the subject of many of his paintings, including Portrait of Laura, Jews Praying in the Synagogue on Yom Kippur, Shylock and Jessica, and Uriel Acosta and Judith.

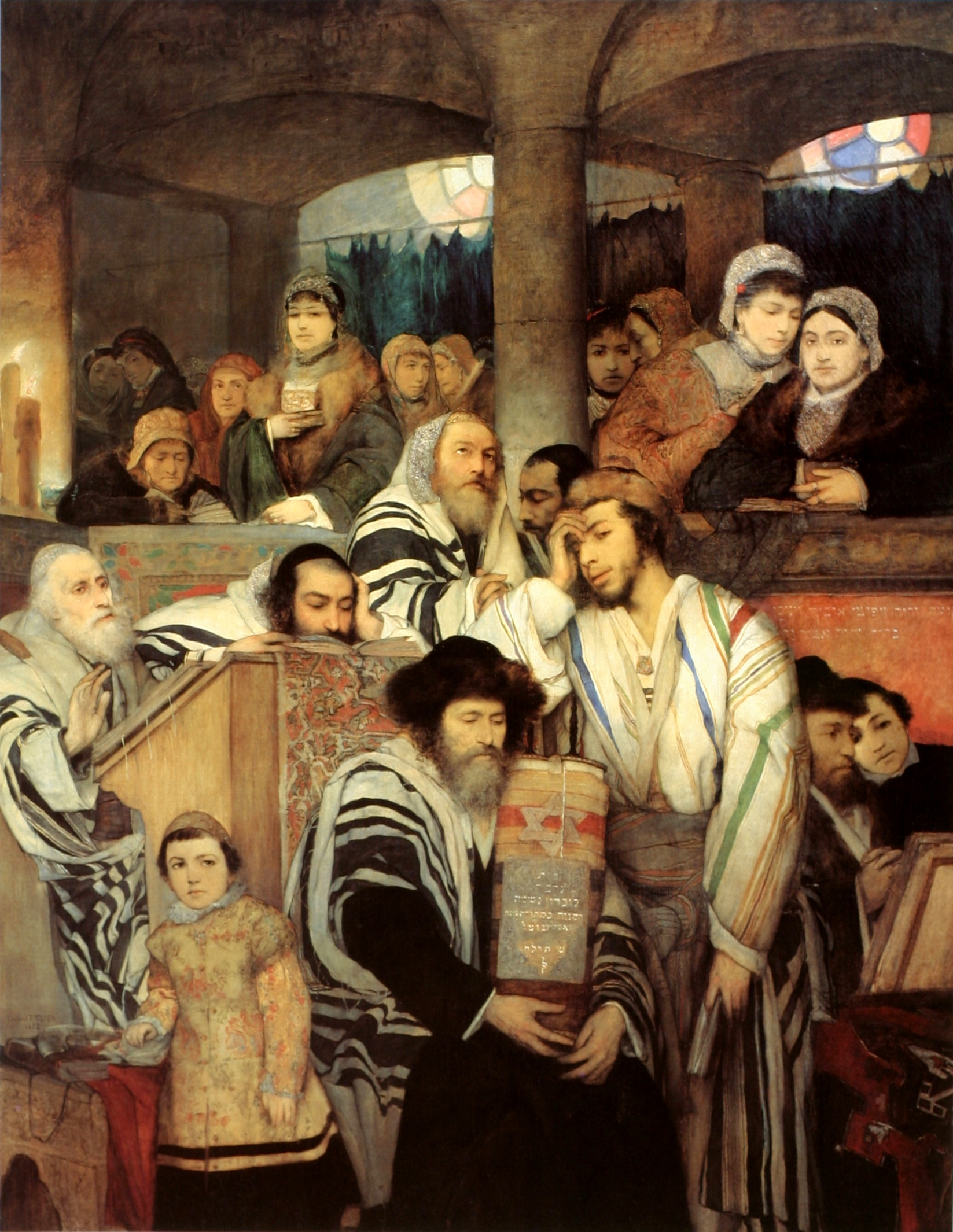
Jews Praying in the Synagogue on Yom Kippur

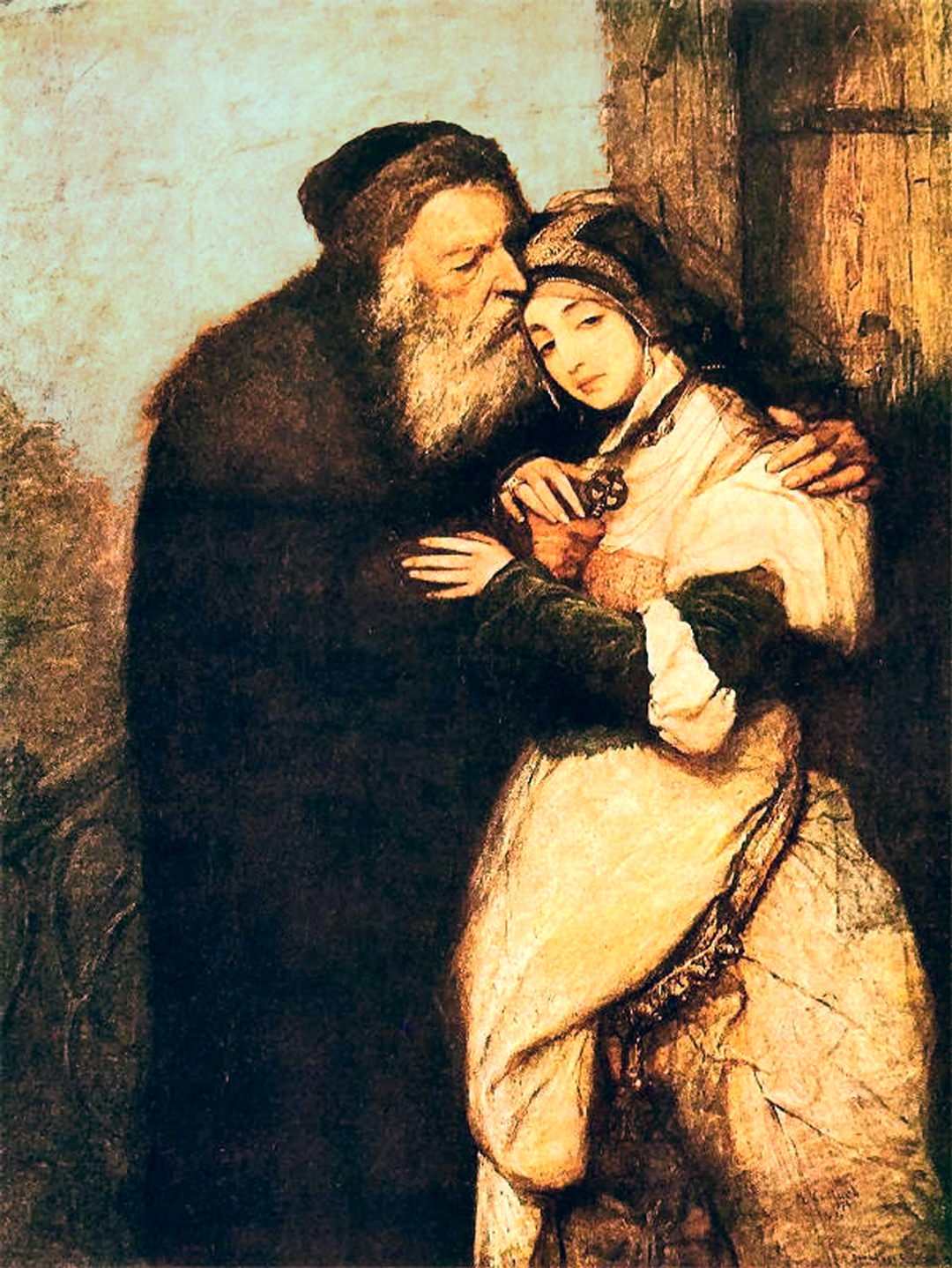
Shylock and Jessica

Gottlieb travelled between his hometown of Drohobych and Vienna, and Laura soon began to lose interest in him. Sensing her distance in their letters, Gottlieb became more and more anxious until Laura finally confessed she had fallen in love with someone else.

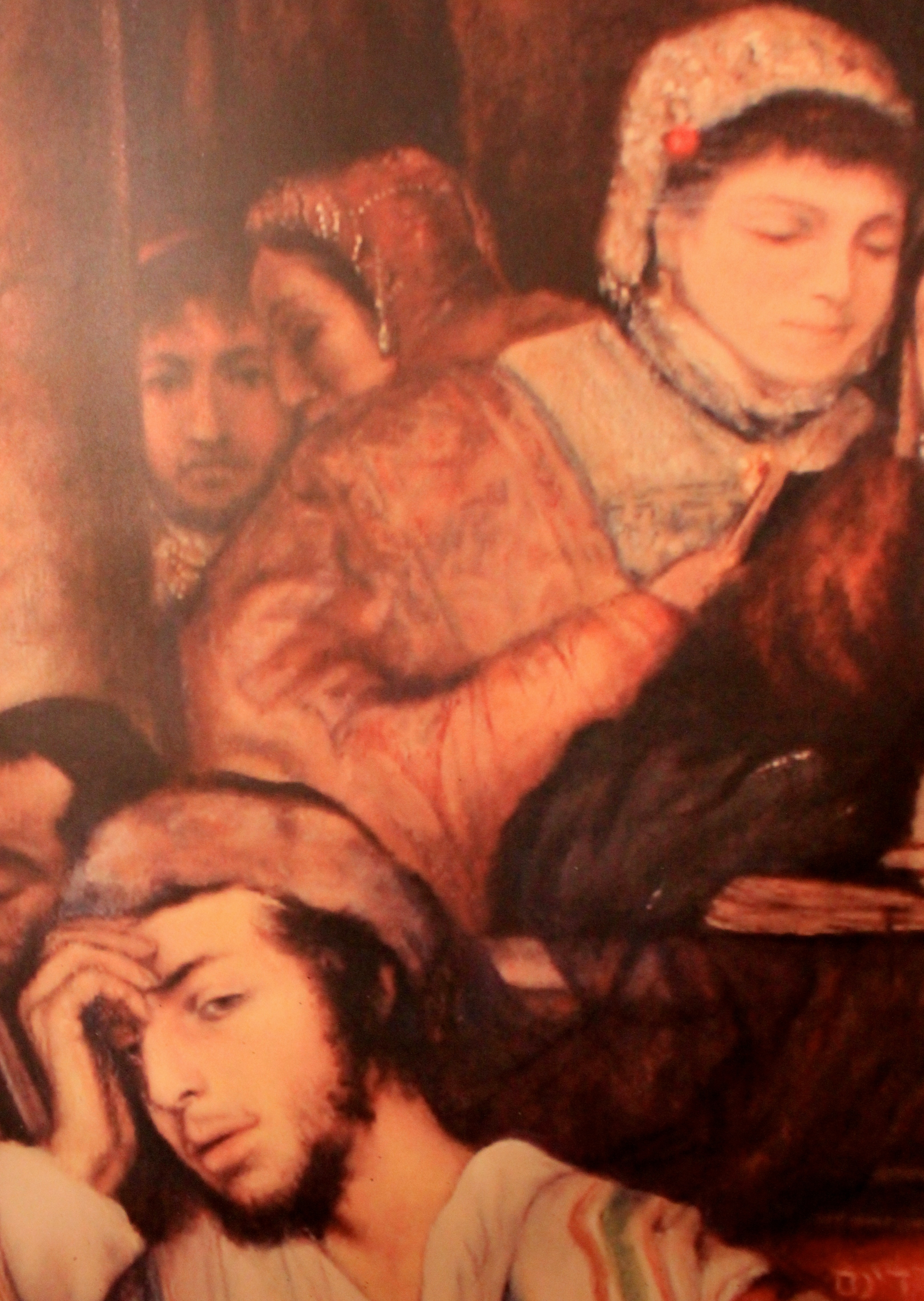
Detail of Jews Praying in the Synagogue on Yom Kippur showing Laura and Maurycy

Rosenfeld married Leo Henschel, a prosperous Berlin banker, on 3 July 1879. Gottlieb learnt about it two weeks later and intentionally exposed himself to the elements out of despair over his failed romance, dying on 17 July 1879. Evidence of his sorrow can be found in his letters to Henschel-Rosenfeld, and in his painting, Jews Praying in the Synagogue on Yom Kippur, in which he placed his own name on the memorial inscription on the Torah mantle.

== Life after Gottlieb ==
Henschel-Rosenfeld had four daughters: the eldest perished in the Holocaust, one died at a young age, and the other two survived. Her eldest daughter, Margarete Steiner-Henschel, was murdered on 31 August 1944 in Auschwitz.

While Rosenfeld ran the busy Berlin household, she also continued to read and study. After her husband died in 1909, and her children had left home, she dedicated her life to education and social work. She worked in an orphanage for children of criminals and as a social worker among the needy segments of the population, and she established a communal home near Berlin which stressed harmony and equality amongst its residents.

She later founded "The House of the Order of the Free Spirit", calling it a "school for human education" and attracting many followers who knew her as "Mother Henschel". She was also active with feminism and human rights movements outside of Germany.

== Writings and philosophy ==
Henschel-Rosenfeld was a prolific writer, penning some 150 volumes concerning her family history, childhood recollections and philosophical reflections. Virtually all were lost during the Nazi occupation, save one 340 page leather-bound volume written in German by her own hand, called, "The Youngest Generation". The book is divided into two sections: intimate comments about her family written after the death of her husband in 1909, and memoirs, thoughts and ideas written after 1940, during her time as a refugee in the Netherlands.

The only other written materials containing her thoughts are to be found in a commemorative book published as part of the Castrum Peregrini series in Amsterdam in 1951, comprising some 102 pages. The book contains a collection of Henschel-Rosenfeld's ideas, along with two articles in German written by Lothar Helvling ("Mother Henschel") and Rudolph Eilhard ("Talks with Mother"). Both writers became acquainted with Henschel-Rosenfed during the last years of her life, and admired her greatly.

According to Israeli art critic Eugen Kolb, who authored a short monograph on her life, Laura Henschel-Rosenfeld's writings "attest to wide spiritual horizons and a philosophical bent." She was aristocratic not only in appearance, but also in spirit" as it attested to a few selected quotes from her work.

=== Notable Quotes from Kolb published work on Rosenfeld [translated from Hebrew] ===
- "They say that all men are equal. No canvas is any different from another - that is certainly true. But the pictures each man paints on the canvas of his life - those are not the same."
- "A man of noble spirit sees himself responsible for everything in the world."
- "Everyone who has must give. Everyone who can must do. Everyone capable of living a full life must teach."

== Death ==
In 1933, with the rise of Nazi Germany, she fled to the Netherlands, where she lived in an old age home in Amsterdam. For a while, she was hidden by a friend in the east of the Netherlands until she was informed upon. At 86 years of age, paralyzed and almost blind, she was transported to Westerbork transit camp, and from there to Auschwitz-Birkenau. The last known record of her is on 4 April 1944.

== Legacy ==
Henschel-Rosenfeld and her eldest daughter, Margarete, are commemorated on a memorial monument in Zeist.

Bat Sheva Scheflan (1910–2007), the daughter of Margarete Steiner-Henschel and the granddaughter of Laura Henschel-Rosenfeld, moved to Kibbutz Heftziba in Israel. In 1955, she and her maternal aunt, Vali Marx, donated Gottlieb's Portrait of Laura to the Tel Aviv Museum of Art.
