= Kolbe =

Kolbe is a surname.

Those bearing it include:

- Adolph Wilhelm Hermann Kolbe (1818–1884), German chemist
- Andreas Kolbe (fl. 1557), German printer, prominent in Marburg in the 1540s and 1550s
- Caroline Ridderstolpe, née Kolbe (1793–1878), Swedish composer and singer
- Cheslin Kolbe (born 1993), South African rugby union player
- Clive Kolbe (1944–2016), South African cricketer
- Daniela Kolbe (born 1980), German politician
- Emma Coe Kolbe (1850–1913), business woman and plantation owner of mixed American/Samoan descent
- Fritz Kolbe (1900–1971), German diplomat and World War II Allied spy
- Georg Kolbe (1877–1947), German sculptor
- Heinrich Christoph Kolbe (1771–1836), German painter
- Helga Kolbe, retired German rower
- Hellmuth Kolbe (1926–2002), Swiss musician, audio recording and acoustics pioneer
- Hermann Julius Kolbe (1855–1939), German entomologist
- Ino Kolbe (1914–2010), born Ino Voigt, German Esperantist
- Jim Kolbe (1942-2022), American politician
- Johann Kasimir Kolbe von Wartenberg (1643–1712), the first ever Minister-President of the kingdom of Prussia
- Josefine 'Pepa' Kolbe, a female Austrian international table tennis player.
- Laura Kolbe (born 1957), Finnish professor of European history
- Maximilian Kolbe (1894–1941), Polish Conventual Franciscan friar and saint
- Parke Kolbe (1881–1942), American author, teacher, administrator and university president
- Peter Kolbe (1675–1726), German astronomer and explorer of South Africa
- Peter-Michael Kolbe (1953-2023), German rower and five time world champion
- Steve Kolbe (born 1967), American sportscaster
- Tanja Kolbe (born 1990), German ice dancer
- Winrich Kolbe (1940–2012), German-born American television director and producer

== See also ==
- Kolb (surname)
