= Psychonaut (album) =

Studio album by Brainticket
- Released: 1971
- Recorded: Durium Studios, Milano, Italy
- Genre: Psychedelic rock, experimental rock, krautrock
- Length: 31:48
- Label: Bellaphon
- Producer: Brainticket

Brainticket chronology
Cottonwoodhill (1971)	Psychonaut (1971)	Celestial Ocean (1974)

Professional ratings
Review scores
Source	Rating
Allmusic	3/5 stars

Psychonaut is the second studio album by krautrock band Brainticket. It is often described as more relaxed and less experimental than their first record.

== Track listing ==
1. "Radagacuca" (Joel Vandroogenbroeck, Montedoro) – 7:21
2. "One Morning" (Joel Vandroogenbroeck) – 3:52
3. "(There's a Shadow) Watchin' You" (Joel Vandroogenbroeck) – 4:33
4. "Like a Place in the Sun" (Joel Vandroogenbroeck) – 6:26
5. "Feel the Wind Blow" (Joel Vandroogenbroeck) – 3:30
6. "Coc'o Mary" (Joel Vandroogenbroeck) – 6:06

== Personnel ==
=== The Band ===
- Jane Free - Lead Vocals, Tbilat, Tambourine, Slide Whistle, Sounds
- Joel Vandroogenbroeck - Organ, Piano, Flute, Sitar, Sanze Vocal, Rumors, Generator, Arrangements
- Rolf Hug - Lead Guitar, Acoustic Guitar, Tablas, Vocals
- Martin Sacher: Electric Bass, Flute
- Barney Palm - Drums, Percussion, Strange Sounds
- Carol Muriel - Speaking on "Like a Place in the Sun" and oooh... oooh... on "Feel the Wind Blow"
- Peter - Witch Doctor and Good Vibes.

=== Technical staff ===
- All Songs published by DURIUM
- Cover by UMBERTO SANTUCCI
- Recorded at DURIUM STUDIOS, Milano
- Engineers: UGO SCERBO and PIERO BISLERI
- Produced by BRAINTICKET
