= Thomas Kolb =

American radiologist

Thomas M. Kolb is an American radiologist specializing in the detection and diagnosis of breast cancer in young, predominantly high-risk premenopausal women. He has served as an assistant clinical professor of Radiology at Columbia University College of Physicians and Surgeons from 1994–2010. Kolb is double board certified, having received his training in pediatrics at the Albert Einstein College of Medicine in Bronx, New York, and in diagnostic radiology at the Columbia-Presbyterian Medical Center in New York.

Kolb holds positions on the board of directors of the Breast and Prostate Cancer Research Foundation in New York, is chairman of the medical advisory committee of Sharsheret, and is part of the medical advisory committee for the Young Survival Coalition. Kolb is a member of the New York Breast Cancer Study group, which co-authored the research publication "Breast and Ovarian Cancer Risks Due to Inherited Mutations in BRCA1 and BRCA2" published in the journal Science in 2003 detailing the clinical effect of breast cancer genetic mutations.

In 1998, Kolb published the first contemporary study detailing the use of breast ultrasound to detect cancers that are both mammographically and physically occult. His subsequent 2002 publication in the journal Radiology "Comparison of the Performance of Screening Mammography, Physical Examination and Breast US and Evaluation of the Factors that Influence Them: An Analysis of 27,825 Patient Evaluations" was chosen as the scientific paper of the year by the American Medical Association (AMA) science writers group for the year 2002. The study identified breast density as an important factor in the effectiveness of mammography, and reported that the additional use of ultrasound could significantly improve early breast cancer detection rates for women with dense breasts.

Kolb has been a manuscript reviewer for the journal Radiology. His manuscripts and research have focused on the critical evaluation of current breast cancer screening modalities, genetic predispositions to breast cancer, and the use of novel techniques and technologies, such as infrared and electrical impedance imaging, for the detection and diagnosis of breast cancer.

Kolb is a principal investigator of the North American Digital Breast Tomosynthesis project trial, which is analyzing a novel mammographic technology that acquires multiplanar images of the breasts.

Kolb is a member of numerous professional organizations including the American Roentgen Ray Society, the Radiological Society of North America, the Society of Breast Imaging and the New York Metropolitan Breast Cancer Group. He is a fellow of the American College of Radiology and a fellow of the American Academy of Pediatrics.

== Selected publications ==
- Kolb, T. M.; Lichy, J.; Newhouse, J. H. (April 1998). "Occult cancer in women with dense breasts: detection with screening US--diagnostic yield and tumor characteristics". Radiology. 207 (1): 191–199. doi:10.1148/radiology.207.1.9530316. ISSN 0033-8419. PMID 9530316.
- Kolb, Thomas M.; Lichy, Jacob; Newhouse, Jeffrey H. (October 2002). "Comparison of the Performance of Screening Mammography, Physical Examination, and Breast US and Evaluation of Factors that Influence Them: An Analysis of 27,825 Patient Evaluations". Radiology. 225 (1): 165–175. doi:10.1148/radiol.2251011667. ISSN 0033-8419. PMID 12355001.
- King, Mary-Claire; Marks, Joan H.; Mandell, Jessica B.; New York Breast Cancer Study Group (24 October 2003). "Breast and Ovarian Cancer Risks Due to Inherited Mutations in BRCA1 and BRCA2" (PDF). Science. 302 (5645): 643–646. Bibcode:2003Sci...302..643K. doi:10.1126/science.1088759. PMID 14576434.
