= Culp, Alberta =

Locality in Alberta, Canada

Coordinates: 55.75008°N 117.53595°W

Culp is a locality in Alberta, Canada.

The locality has the name of J. H. Culp, a railroad official.
