= Brainticket =

European band

- Origin: Switzerland
- Genres: Krautrock, psychedelic rock, experimental rock, progressive rock, Acid Rock
- Years active: 1968–1975, 1980–1983, 1998–2019
- Labels: Cleopatra Records
- Past members: Joel Vandroogenbroeck; Cosimo Lampis; Ron Bryer; Wolfgang Paap; Dawn Muir; Carole Muriel; Rolf Hug; Martin Sacher; Barni Palm; Wilhelm Seefeldt; Hans Deyssenroth; Stephanie Wolff
- Website: brainticket.bandcamp.com

Brainticket was an experimental European band most active in the early 1970s, and known for its use of exotic instruments and jazz-inspired compositions. The only constant member was Belgian musician Joel Vandroogenbroeck until his death in 2019. The band continued to perform concerts and release albums in the 2000s.

== History ==
Brainticket was founded by Joel Vandroogenbroeck (born Brussels, 25 August 1938; died 23 December 2019),

Joel Vandroogenbroeck died at the age of 81 on December 23, 2019, in Guadalajara, Mexico.

== Discography ==
=== Studio albums ===
Year	Album
1971	Cottonwoodhill
1972	Psychonaut
1974	Celestial Ocean
1980	Adventure
1982	Voyage
2000	Alchemic Universe
2015	Past, Present & Future

=== Live albums ===
Year	Album
1985	New Age Concert
2011	Live in Rome 1973

=== Compilation albums ===
Year	Album
2011	The Vintage Anthology 1971 - 1980
