= Eugen Kolb =

Hungarian-born Israeli art critic and theorist

Eugen Kolb (Eugene Kolb; February 21, 1898 – September 14, 1959) was an art critic, theorist of art and director of the Tel Aviv Museum of Art from 1952 until his death in 1959.

== Biography ==
Eugene (Jan) Kolb was born in 1898 in Sopron, Hungary. His mother was Gisela Schlesinger, and his father was Shimon Kolb who came from the famous Teitelbaum family from Satmar (Hasidic dynasty).

In World War I, he was an officer in the Austro-Hungarian army, where he was wounded and taken prisoner in Russia. After the war, he studied art history at the Academy of Fine Arts in Munich (Akademie der Künste München Bildenden), and the University of Vienna. His teachers included Heinrich Flynn and Max Dvořák, who had a profound influence on his spiritual development and ideology. After graduating, he settled in Budapest.

Kolb is one of the survivors of the Kastner train by which he arrived in 1944 in Switzerland with his wife and daughter. After settling in Palestine in 1946, he worked for Al Hamishmar, the newspaper of Hashomer Hatzair.

In 1952 he was appointed general manager of the Tel Aviv Museum. He was married to Edith Meller and they had one daughter, Shoshanna Hasson-Kolb, who edited her father's recollections of his time in Bergen Belsen.

He died at his home in Givatayim from a heart attack in 1959 at the age of 61, and is buried in Kiryat Shaul cemetery. His funeral was attended by hundreds of people.

== Professional activity and public reputation ==
In Budapest, he rose to a senior position in Hungarian culture. He worked as artistic editor for Singer and Wolfner one of the biggest and most successful Hungarian publishers and in this context published monographs on Hungarian painters. He was also editor of artistic values in the Encyclopedia "Oh Idoko" (New Times), a 24 volume general encyclopedia.

In 1939, he joined the Gordon Group (the group for older members of Hashomer Hatzair). He represented the movement in the Jewish community and was active in the Zionist Federation. As a refugee in Switzerland, in 1945, he was correspondent for the newspaper "Mishmar", later called "Al Hamishmar". With the move to Israel, he was able to master the Hebrew language, and from - 1946 to 1959 he wrote articles on art and art criticism in "Al Hamishmar" and in the magazines of the period, including one started by Avraham Shlonsky. He also lectured on matters of art.

Kolb understood that unlike literature, theater and music, the visual arts did not assume a central position in Israel, and worked to raise the level. Among other things, he supported the establishment of the group of artists known as "New Horizons" (Ofakim Hadashim) and helped launch their careers. In 1950 he was appointed artistic adviser to the Tel Aviv Museum, and in 1952 he was appointed general manager. At the same time he continued to lecture at the Kibbutz Seminars, and among Hashomer Hatzair's Centre for Progressive Culture.

As director of the Tel Aviv Museum, he emphasized the uniqueness of Israeli painting and insisted that it have a connection to Jewish art. He took upon himself to promote the status of art in the country and even assisted artists who did not follow in the abstract path of the artist Yosef Zaritsky. As director of the museum he gave them proper representation and was responsible for exhibitions of Shalom Sebba, Avigdor Arica, Naftali Bezem, Moshe Bernstein, and, in 1957 an exhibition of Aviva Uri.

His activities in the world of Israeli art only lasted 13 years, but were very significant and productive.

== Commemoration ==
The "Kolb Foundation" was established with donations of works by 59 artists, and is managed by the Tel Aviv Museum. Every two years the "Eugen Kolb Prize for Israeli Graphic Art" is awarded by the foundation.

== Publications ==
- Leonardo da Vinci : the creator and his creation - man and his world / by A. Kolb, Tel Aviv: Massada, 5713
- Titian, chosen painters Venice / edited and was explained by a. Kolb, with a biographical introduction by Oscar Fischel, Tel Aviv: Massada 5714
- Raphael : the artist and his work in the perspective of the most famous photographs / edited and explained by a. Kolb, with a biographical introduction by Leopold Tzone, Tel Aviv: Massada, 5713
- 20 masterpiece paintings: an introduction and explanatory notes: A. Kolb, Tel Aviv: Massada, 5719.
- Israeli-graphics / Zvi Zohar, Eugen Kolb, Workers Library - Department of Art, 1960.
- Vilmos Kovácsházy, István Genthon, & Jenö Nyilas-Kolb, Budapester Bilderbuch / Geleitw. v. Vilmos Kovácsházy; Zsgest. durch István Genthon, Jenö Nyilas-Kolb. (Mitarb.), Budapest: Somló, [1933].
- Budapest illustrated: 199 pictures with a supplement (Hungarian Towns and Landscapes: Pictures of Historic Souvenirs and Natural Scenery of Hungary) / introd. by Vilmos Kovácsházy; arranged by István Genthon and Jenö Nyilas-Kolb; translated into English by FG Redward, Budapest: Béla Somló, [194 -?].
- Régi játékkártyák; magyar és külföldi kártyafestés, XV.-XIX. század. Összeállította és magyarázó szöveggel ellátta Kolb Jenö, [Budapest, Hungária Nyomda, 1939]. (Another edition: Budapest: Állami Könyvterjesztő Vállalat, 1984 ..)
- Jenő Nyilas-Kolb, Farkas István, Budapest: Bisztrai Farkas Ferencz Kiadása, 1935.
- Eugene Kolb, Old playing-cards, from the fifteenth to the nineteenth century, [Budapest: Hungarian Printing Office, 1940].
- Bergen-Belsen Tagebuch / Jeno Eugen Kolb; Herausgegeben von Shoshanna Hasson-Kolb, Alexander Barzel und Thomas Rahe, (translated from Hungarian by Detlef Müller), [Germany]: [sn], 2000 - Diary of Bergen - Belsen (decoded by Alexander Barzel, who was with Kolb in the camp, and was conducted by him and by Kolb's daughter, Shoshanna Hasson-Kolb, and Thomas Raha).

== Articles, introductions, forewords ==
- A memorial exhibition of works by sculptor Ze'ev Ben Zvi : 1952-1904 / (Introduction a. hanger), Tel Aviv: Tel Aviv Museum, 1954.
- Jacob Pins, landscapes woodcuts / with an introduction by A. Kolb, Tel Aviv: Dvir, 5715.
- Abstract and surreal paintings [catalog] / foreword by A. Kolb, Tel Aviv Museum [Tel Aviv], 5715.
- Siren Ilin - oil paintings exhibition / (Article Introduction: E.Kolb), Tel Aviv: Tel Aviv Museum 5716, 1956. Siren Ilin was the wife of Ephraim Ilin .)
- New Acquisitions: Selected works added to the museum in 1955-1952 / (Introduction A. Kolb), Tel Aviv: Tel Aviv Museum Tst"z.
- Menachem Shemi : 48 images and a selection of letters and drawings / edited by Moshe Bassok; introduction: a. Kolb, Tel Aviv: United Kibbutz Law.
- Lake - painting in motion, shifting pictures / (A. Kolb - Introduction article), Tel Aviv: Tel Aviv Museum 5718- 1958.
- Moshe Bernstein, Jewish characters / introduction: a. Kolb; graphic editing: from. Brand, Tel Aviv: Yavne, 5722.
- Menachem Shemi : 8-color images / Introductions: a. Kolb, out. Bassok, Tel Aviv: KM, appropriate group - 5726- 1966.
- Statues / Jacob Lotz'ansky; Opening Remarks: a. Kolb, Jean Cassou; photographs made by Israel Tsafrir, Tel Aviv: United Kibbutz XX,. (Edition: Kibbutz Givat - Brenner, Hmo"l, Tsl.)
- In his prime: Maurycy Gottlieb 1856-1879 / cataloging: comfort Guralnick; articles by Eugen Kolb, Jerzy Malinowski, Tel Aviv: Tel Aviv Museum of Art, 1991.
- In the Flower of Youth/ Ofakim, Edited by Zvi Zohar, 12 year, no 1(41), 1958

== List of publications ==
- Bruriah Gratzberg, Eugen Kolb (anniversary of his death), which, 30 September 1960
- Dalia Manor, a portrait of the critic expansive horizons, the site of the country, 25 April 2004
