= Hellmuth Kolbe =

Swiss musician

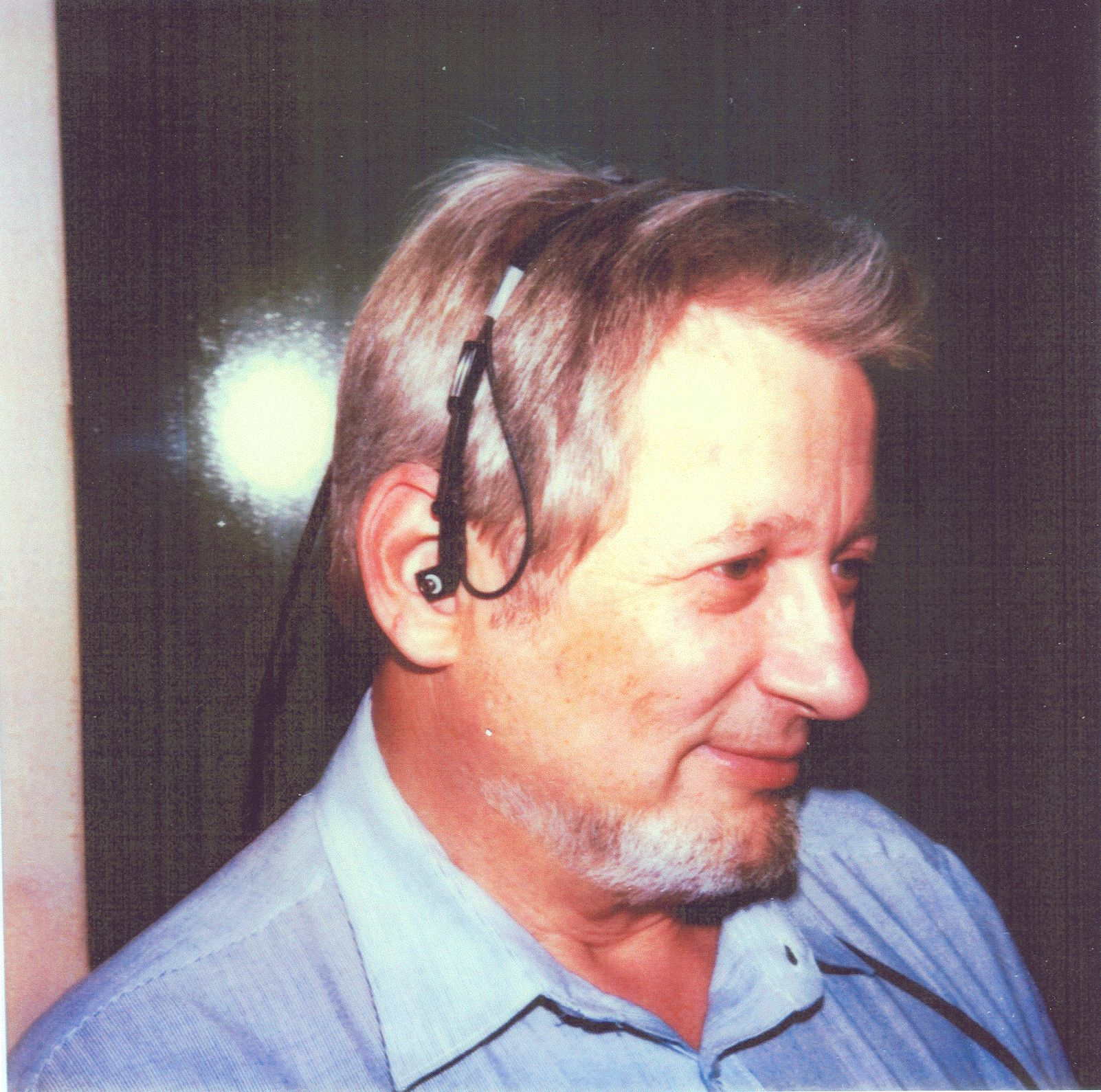
- Hellmuth Kolbe, about 1990

Background information
- Born: Hellmuth Kolbe; 28 August 1926
- Origin: Berlin, Germany
- Genres: Rock, pop, classical music, folklore, experimental
- Occupations: Record producer, arranger, composer, musician, conductor, acoustics pioneer
- Instruments: Vibraphone, keyboards, bass
- Years active: ca. 1950–2002
- Labels: Viennola, Austroton (Austrophon-Elite-Special, Vienna, Austria), CBS, Vox, Vanguard, Ex Libris, Phonag, Helvetia

Hellmuth Kolbe (28 August 1926, in Switzerland – 15 July 2002, in Zurich, Switzerland) was a musician and an audio recording and acoustics pioneer.

== Early life ==
Kolbe was the son of Walter Karl Kolbe, an Austrian lawyer and Editha Berta Ehrbar of Vienna who was related to the Austrian piano manufacturer Friedrich Ehrbar (1827–1905). Kolbe's parents separated when he was five years old and Kolbe and his mother then moved to Zug, Switzerland, where she remarried. Between 1933 and 1945, Kolbe completed 12 years of schooling. He learnt to play the piano, double-bass and vibraphone. For a season in 1945, Kolbe was a pianist at a hotel in Engelberg and during the day, worked as a ski instructor. He became fluent in English, French, and German and later, Spanish and Italian.

== Education ==
In 1946, Kolbe studied music, musicology and orchestral conducting in Vienna and received his diploma in 1953. He then enrolled at the Vienna Academy of Music and Performing Arts (now called the Vienna University of Music and Performing Arts). Kolbe studied with Hans Erich Apostel (1901–1972), head of the Austrian section of the International Society for Contemporary Music (ISCM) from 1946 to 1948.

== Career ==
From 1947 to 1950, Kolbe was an editor of Universal Edition. He revised scores such as Alban Berg's Wozzeck and Lulu. Kolbe also played with Hot Club Seven, an Austrian band, where he was known to the audience as Hello Kolbe. Fatty George (Franz Georg Pressler) (1927–1982) was another member of this band. The Hot Club Seven played for United States military forces and in Soviet Army officer casinos in Austria.

In 1950, Kolbe gave lectures titled Introduction to Jazz Music at the Österreichische Radio-Verkehrs-Aktiengesellschaft (Austrian radio transmission company (RAVAG), and had his own jazz program each week on Thursday and Friday nights at the RAVAG radio station, Wien I. He led jazz combos and wrote jazz critiques.

=== Rot-Weiss-Rot ===
In 1947, Kolbe approached American Armed Forces Radio, and in 1948 was employed as a producer and engineer for the US forces radio station, Rot-Weiss-Rot (RWR), Vienna. Soon afterwards, the station seconded Kolbe to the Wiener Musikverein to record the performances of orchestras such as the Vienna Philharmonic Orchestra and the Vienna Symphony. In 1987, Kolbe said, “We were two Americans, two Swiss and seventeen Austrians and we were heard all over Europe. My department was jazz and modern classical, together with being involved in the design of the studios. We also did a lot of live concerts including one a week from the large concert hall in Vienna, where we used just one microphone, a Shure modified with an AKG capsule and it sounded wonderful!"

=== Mastertone ===
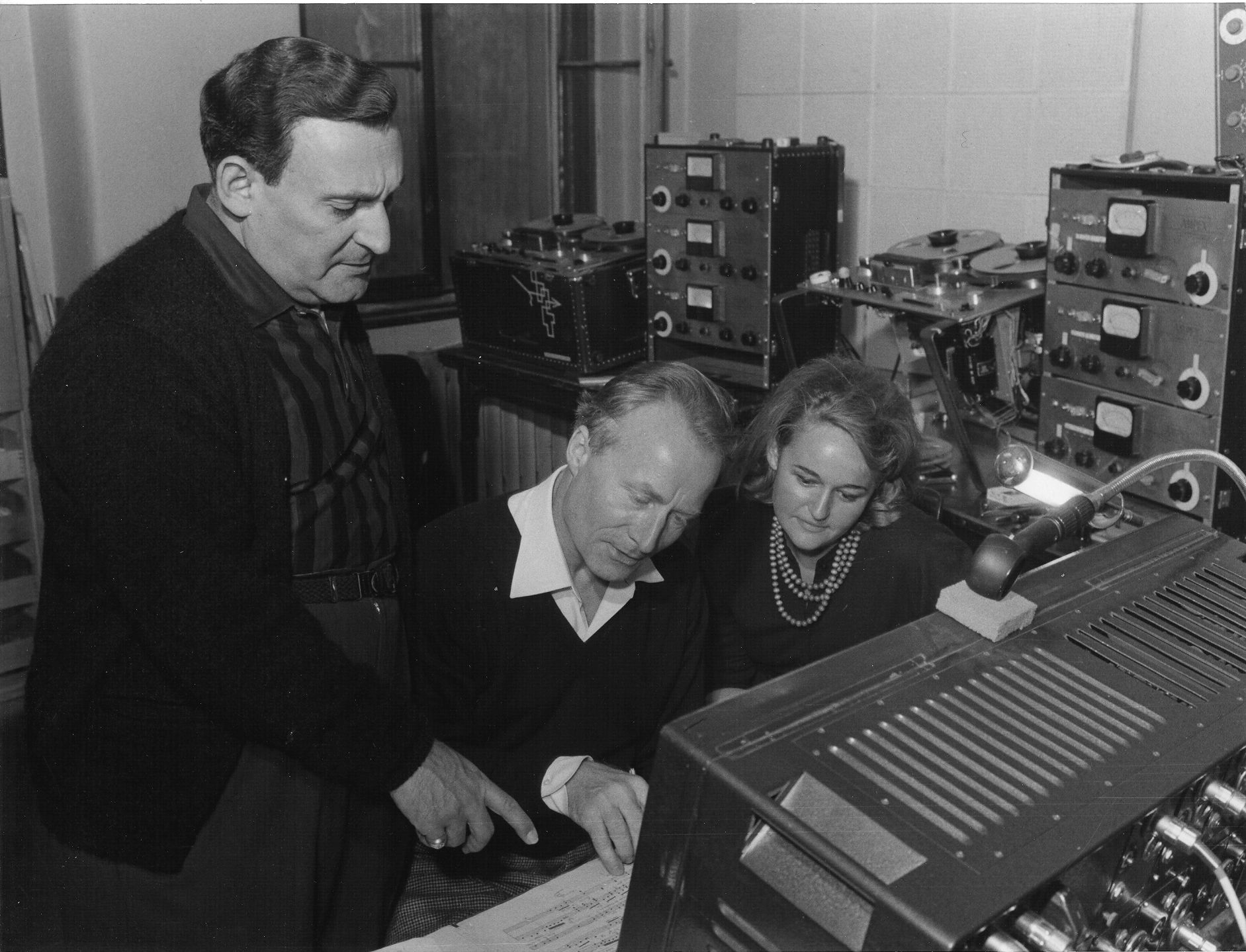
From left to right, Richard Tucker, Pierre Dervaux and Sarah Tucker in Vienna, 1964 with two Ampex 350 3-channel tape recorders, a portable audio processor with XLR connectors, and (probably) an American military style mixing console. Photograph courtesy Ursula Kolbe.

From 1951 to 1963 in Vienna, Kolbe operated "Mastertone", his first recording studio. The Mastertone studio was engaged by Vox and Vanguard. Kolbe said, "At that time, the rate of exchange of the dollar to the Austrian Schilling was very favorable and American record companies soon found it well worthwhile to record in Vienna".

In 1987, Kolbe said, "In the autumn of 1953 [we got] the first stereo tape recorder in Europe, an Ampex 350... which meant we aimed for proper stereo image rather than the 'ping-pong' style that was popular in the early days – everything on the left or the right and no middle". From the beginning, Kolbe was a strong advocator of 3-channel stereo.

In 1956, Kolbe worked with Karlheinz Stockhausen, a composer of electronic music.Together they developed the first electronic music scores in the form of frequency versus time graphs. In 1965, they recorded Stockhausen’s Klavierstücke I-XI (1961) and Mikrophonie I/II (1965). Kolbe engineered both.

=== CBS Masterworks ===
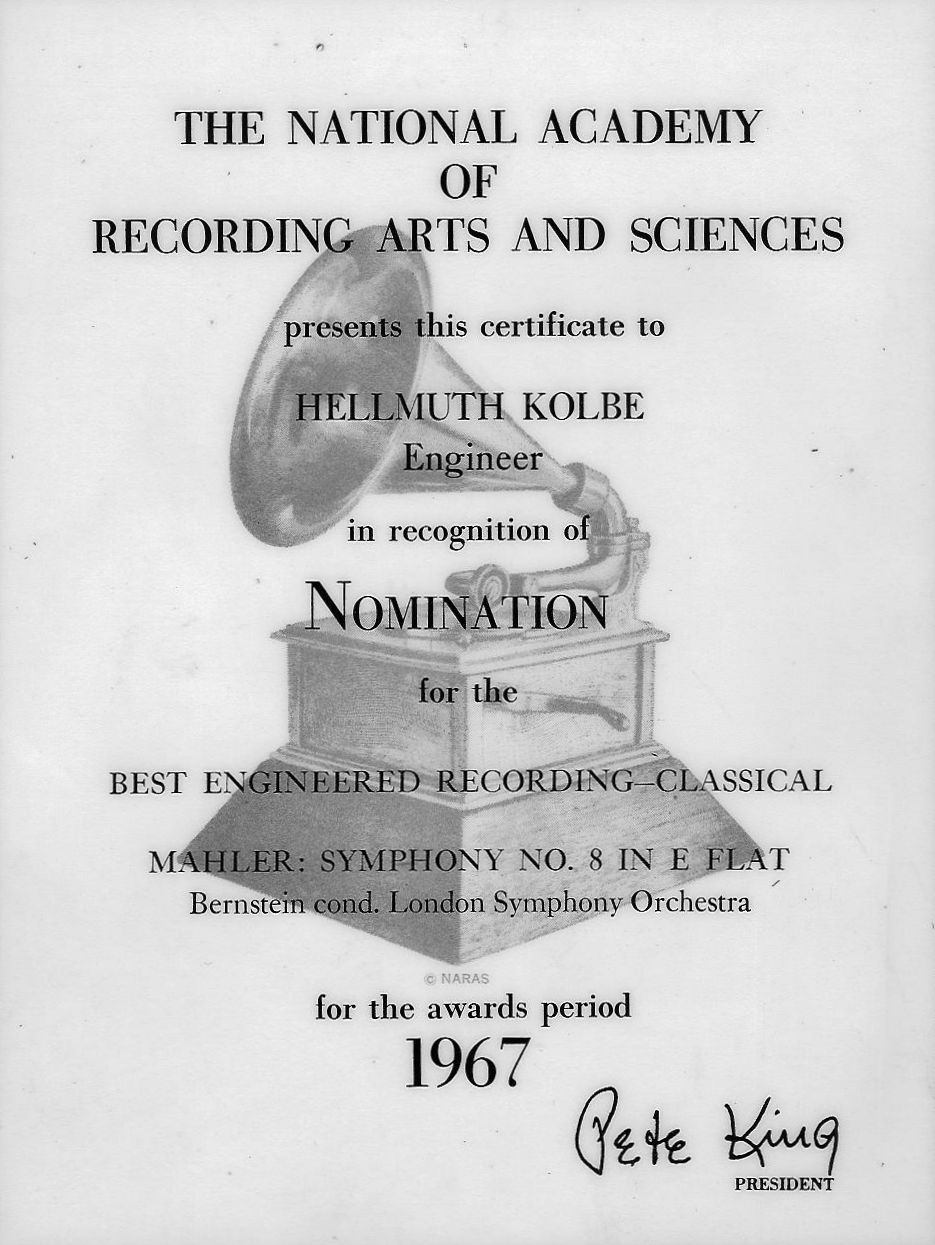
Kolbe's nomination for the best engineered recording (classical) of 1967 issued by the US National Academy of Recording Arts and Sciences (Grammy Award). Picture courtesy Ursula Kolbe.

From 1955 to 1975, Kolbe worked as a freelance recording engineer and producer for Columbia International (CBS Masterworks). He was employed to record all their classical collections in Europe, often uncredited. This work involved extensive travelling to record on location. For example, in April 1966, Kolbe recorded Mahler's 8th symphony with Leonard Bernstein and the London Symphony Orchestra in 3-track stereo in London and was nominated for a "best engineered recording – classical". Also in 1966, Kolbe went to Paris to record Alban Berg's "Wozzeck" with the conductor Pierre Boulez and the "Orchestre et Chœrs de L'Opera", Paris. For this, Kolbe received the Grand prix du disque, an "Académie Charles Cros Diplome". In early June 1967, just after the Six-Day War, Kolbe was in Israel. In the mid1960s, Kolbe researched quadraphonic recording systems with Benjamin B. Bauer for CBS' “Stereo Quadraphonic” (SQ) matrix system. In 1970, Kolbe accompanied the organist, Edward Biggs across Checkpoint Charlie to Leipzig, East Germany to record Bach's works in the Thomaskirche for CBS.

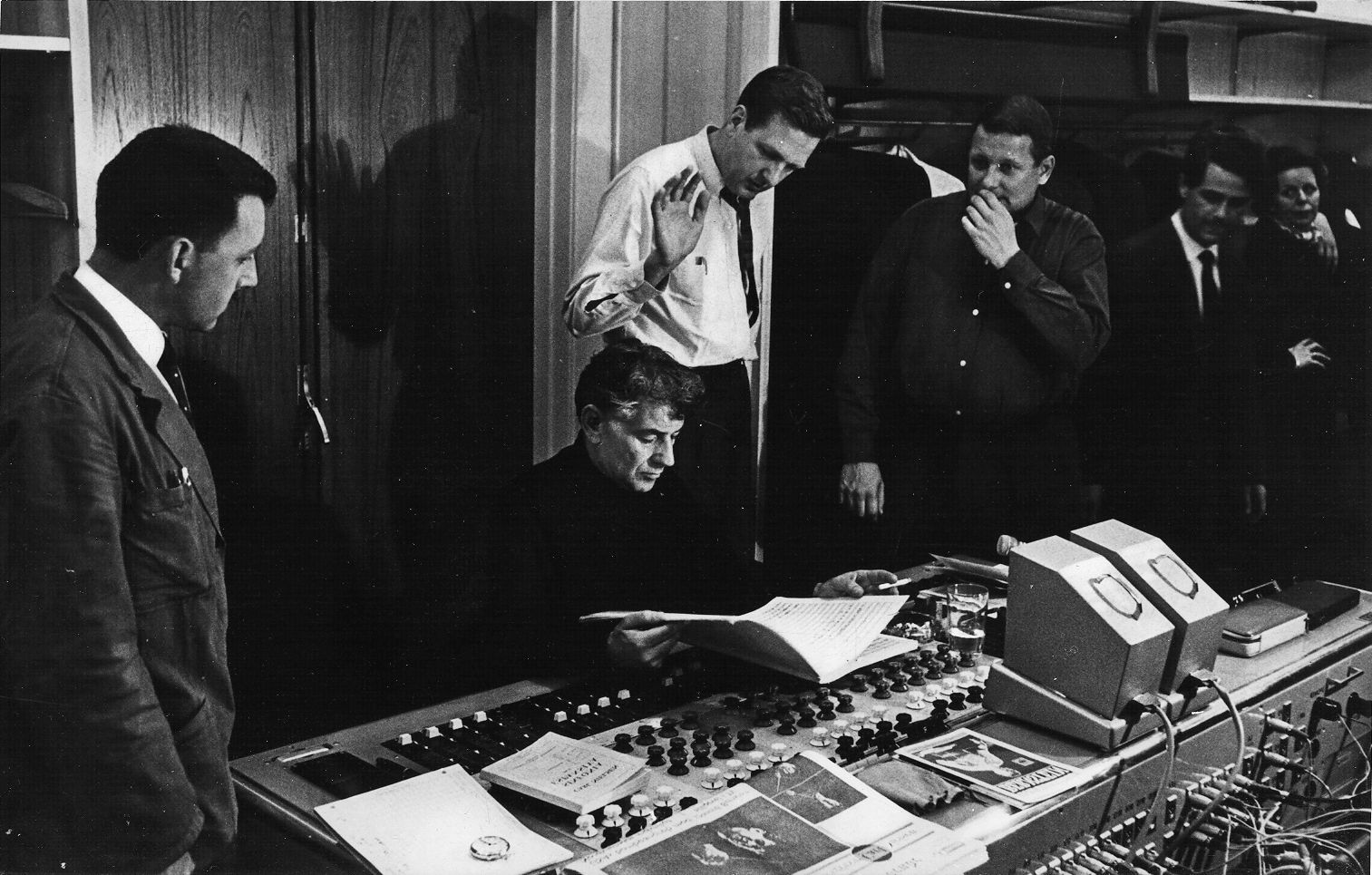
Audio recording for CBS of the 3rd Symphony ("Sinfonia Espansiva") by Danish composer Carl Nielsen Photo courtesy Ursula Kolbe.

=== Phonag record company ===
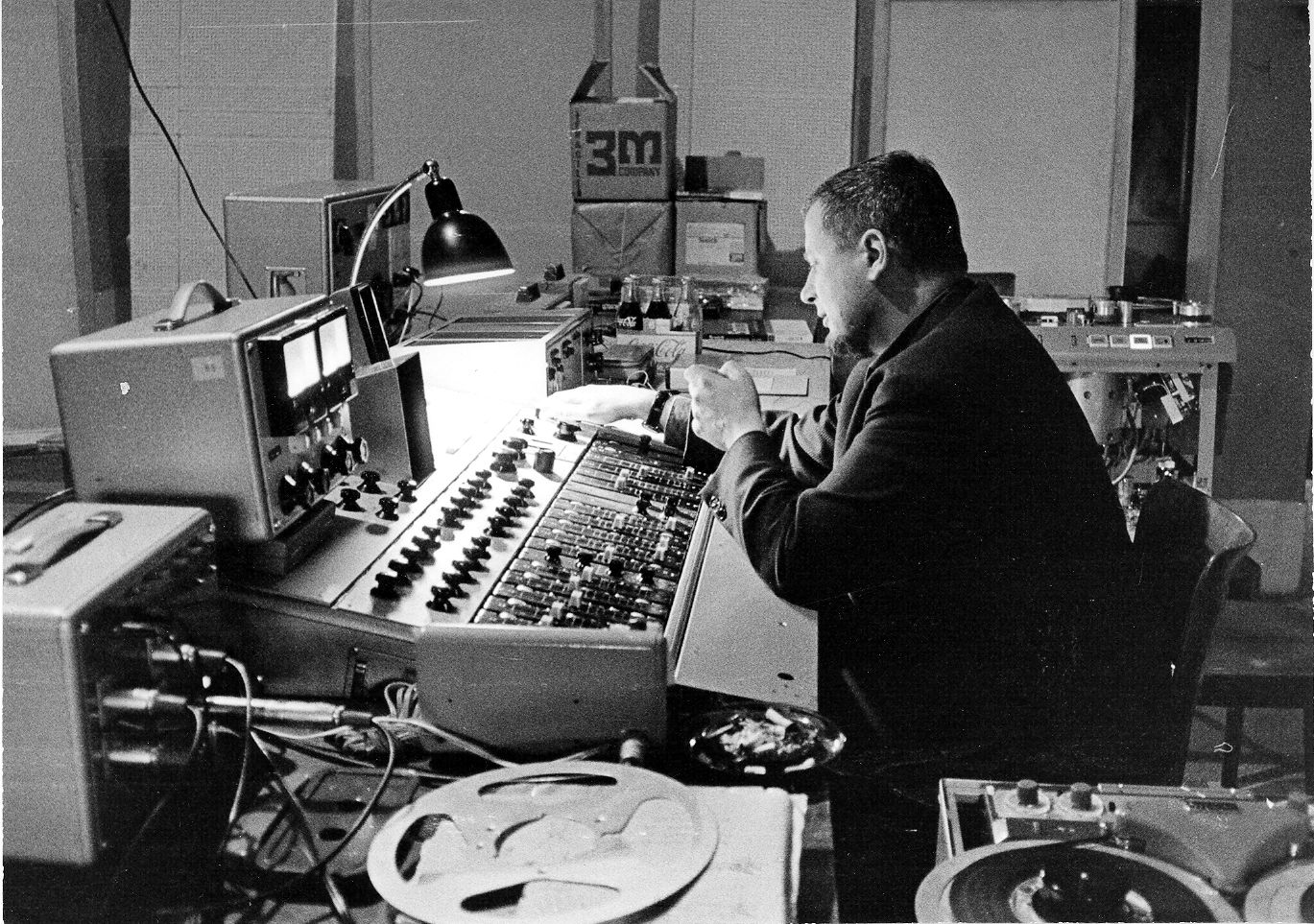
Kolbe in about 1966. Picture courtesy Ursula Kolbe.

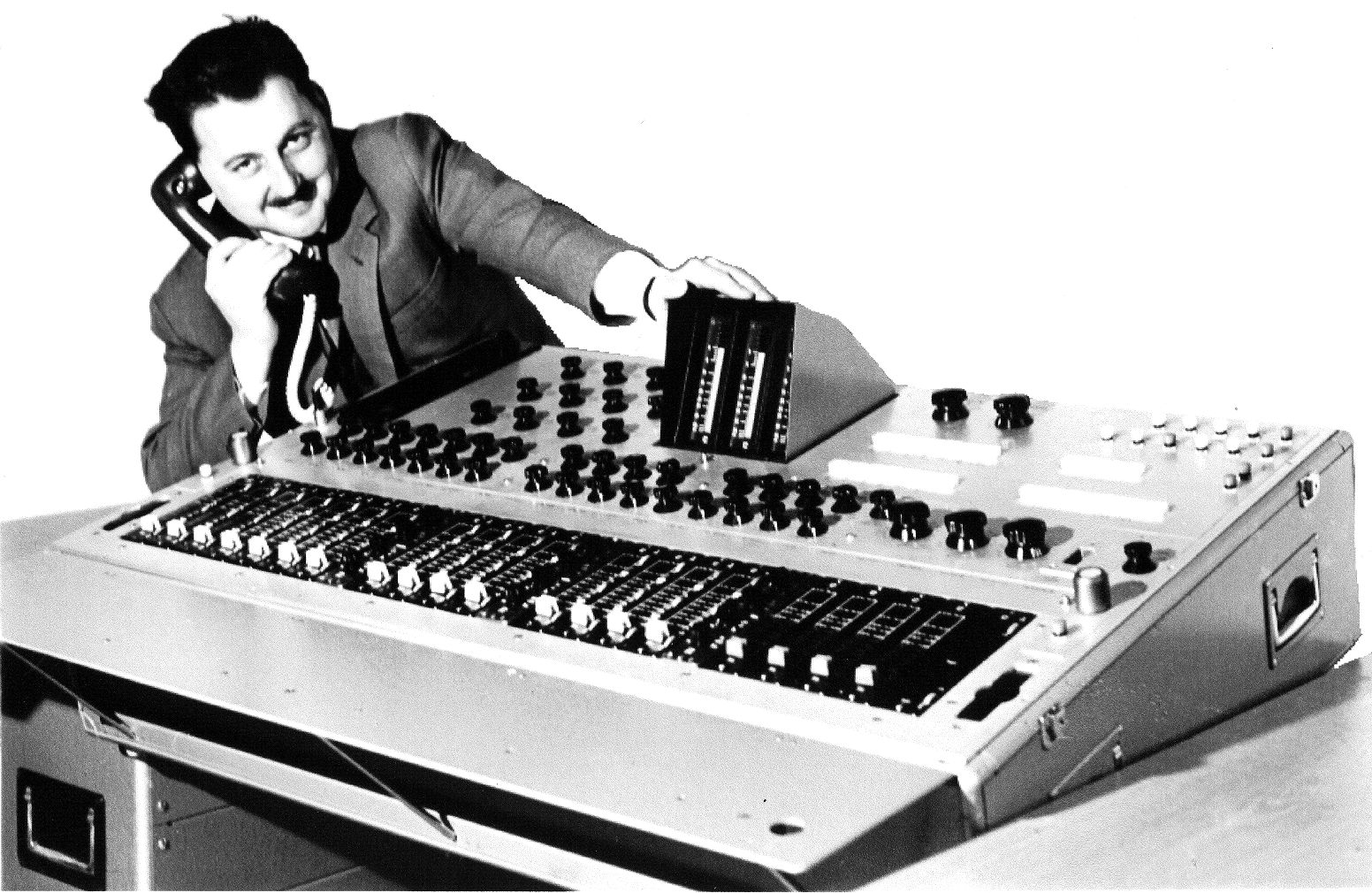
A three-main-channel audio console. Picture courtesy Hans Leonhard.

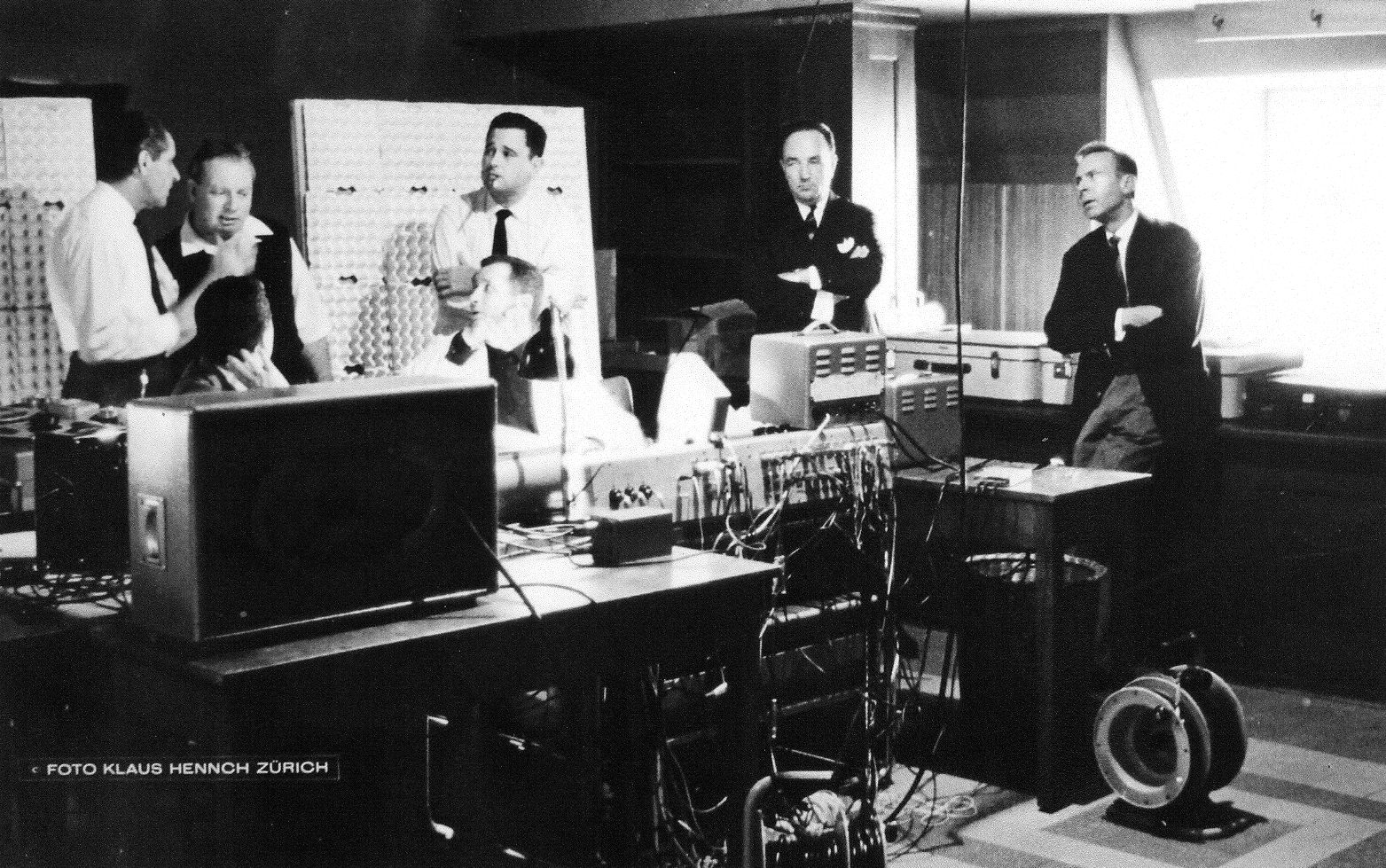
October 1966. From left to right: Leonard Rose (cello), Isaac Stern (violin), Eugene Istomin (piano). Seated at the desk: Leonhard and Kolbe. Picture courtesy Hans Leonhard.

In 1957, Kolbe returned to Switzerland and in 1960 he founded the Phonag Record Company in Winterthur, with the label Helvetia. The company mainly produced Swiss folklore records. In Winterthur, Kolbe recorded at the Kirchgemeindehaus, which had a room with very good acoustics. From 1962, Kolbe's second engineer and apprentice was Robert Lattmann. In April 1966, Kolbe improved his equipment from three small portable microphone mixers without equalizers, dual meters and a ReVox tape recorder to a portable 3-channel tube mixing console, designed and manufactured by Hans Leonhard (Leonhard Electronics, Zürich). This console, which had switchable equalizers co-designed by Kolbe, was used in his studios in Winterthur and Lindau and on most on-location recordings for CBS and Phonag. In October 1966, at the Kirchgemeindehaus in Winterthur Kolbe recorded the Isaac Stern Trio playing the Beethoven Piano Trios, Op. 97, the "Archduke". On 29 June 1970, Kolbe opened a recording studio in Lindau canton, Zürich, Switzerland. The studio measured 161 square meters over two floors. It had a small stage used as storage area. The technical facilities were in a control room with a double-glass window to the studio. Kolbe's first recording console was the modular portable Leonhard valve mixing desk and he used Tannoy integrated concentric coaxial speakers and Studer tape recorders. In 1975, the studio was upgraded to a 16 track transistorised MCI desk and Studer A80 8–16 track recorders. Between 1972 and 1975 Jimmy Duncombe, later co-founder of the Powerplay recording studio in Maur, Switzerland, was the studio manager and recording engineer.

In 1968, Kolbe was a listed member of the Krautrock band, Brainticket, playing keyboards, potentiometers, generators, and sound effects. He was also their producer, engineer, electronics, supervisor and generator. The book Jazz in der Schweiz ("Jazz in Switzerland") mentions Kolbe's work for Brainticket as "way ahead of its time", and Kolbe himself as a "good Jazz pianist", performing under the pseudonym Hello Kamm.

In 1973 Kolbe recorded the Schubert piano trios in D minor, Op. 63, at Victoria Hall, Geneva. The musicians were Arthur Rubinstein (piano), Henryk Szeryng (violin) and Pierre Fournier (cello). Although Kolbe was recording in quad-technology, the final discs were released in 1974 in stereo on RCA Red Seal Records. For this recording, RCA sent an engineer from America.

Phonag's rental lease finished on 30 September 1980 and engineer Robert Lattmann entered into a new contract with the hotel as owner of the studio. On 30 September 1990 this contract was extended for a further five years.

By 1980, Kolbe was focussed on acoustics but was still working part-time at the studio in Lindau. According to a brochure of the time, the studio offered 2, 4, 8 and 16 track facilities with the Studer A80 as the master recorder; the 16 track MCI desk, and additional JBL loudspeakers.

== Acoustics career ==
In January 1973, Switzerland left the Bretton Woods system and adopted a floating currency system. This strengthened the Swiss franc in comparison to the United States dollar. Kolbe, being associated with CBS, was affected by the change and this may have influenced him to take his career in the direction of acoustics. From 1970, Kolbe worked as an acoustic consultant, designing recording studios, control rooms, concert halls, theatres and multi-purpose halls.

For instance, he was engaged by the Leonhard electronics company to plan and construct an auditorium for Hoffman-La Roche Ltd., and another for the Bank for International Settlements, both located in Basel, Switzerland. Kolbe later said, "By the time the 70s came around I was getting tired of living out of a suitcase and I wanted to spend more time with my family. In a way, everything came together: operas were starting to be recorded on 24 tracks and at this stage I felt that the technology was moving in and the music moving out! Also there was a general slump for classics so I was able to cut down on recording and move back to my first studies, which was acoustics. After all, I had recorded in the best – and the worst – halls in the world and had amassed considerable experience. Whenever I was able to, I measured the halls and began to compile a file on hall acoustics." In 1982, the compact disc was introduced. Kolbe believed the format had been rushed into production. Although Kolbe continued to contribute to occasional recording projects, from this time, he concentrated on acoustics and control room design.

Kolbe said, "I started a consultancy service for concert halls, theaters, industrial buildings, domestic, etc. that dealt with all aspects of acoustics such as reverberation, isolation, and so on. I am convinced that in order for anyone to be an acoustics engineer in a musical environment, he has to be a musician. You have to understand the sort of environment that musicians require in a studio, control room or concert hall. Most of us have come across situations in theatres or halls where the orchestra can either hear everybody or each musician is straining to hear his neighbor just to stay in tune. It is the same situation with console manufacturers – the best builders are also users because they know what is required out in the real world."

=== TDS/TEF technology ===
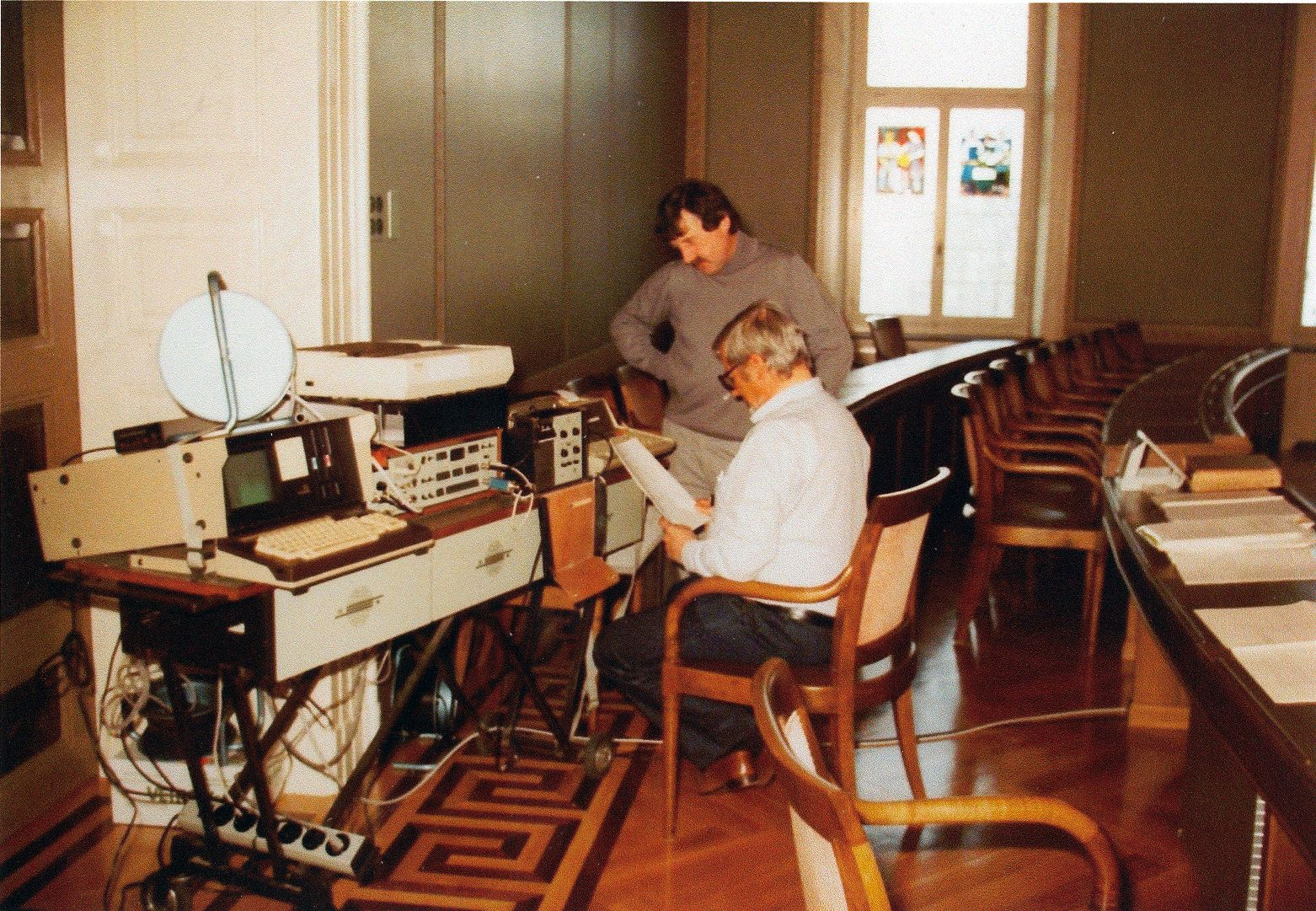
Hellmuth Kolbe and Hans Leonhard at the Ratsaal in Zug, Switzerland, in about 1980, with Kolbe's early TDS/TEF measuring equipment, performing acoustics measurements. Picture courtesy Hans Leonhard.

In 1980, Kolbe was an early user of time delay spectrometry / time energy frequency (TDS/TEF) technology. Kolbe commented, "The development of TDS by the late Richard C. Heyser is, in my opinion, one of the greatest steps forward in acoustics since the work by [Wallace Clement] Sabine (1968–1919). One of the important aspects of it is that you can now prove to a client that what you are doing actually works. Before, he [the client] had to take your word for it. We are involved in studio construction all over the world and anywhere it is rare to be able to build a studio from the ground up – but that's the challenge! For me the most important thing is to make the control room as big as possible – you need space in order to be able to have an uncolored sound. With today's recording techniques most of the music is done in the control room which means that you need space both for the instruments and the sound."

From 1985 onwards, Kolbe researched scale-model acoustic measurements with TDS and stage-acoustics. In 1986 and 1987, Kolbe contributed to the development of the first head-related ear-recording system for acoustic measurement and recording purposes. Kolbe said, "Design criteria are always on the move and I have modified the LEDE concept [Live End-Dead End studio control room technique] to include the Reflection Free Zone (RFZ) manner of design. This gives the most uncolored sound possible in a given situation and provides a natural sound that can be the reference point. Of course, some of the original LEDE principles are still very valid such as the asymmetrical outer shell and completely symmetrical inner shell. The goal is to achieve as natural a sound as possible so that things such as equalization [EQ] can be used as an effect, rather than as an attempt to compensate for coloration and/or bad acoustics. The moment you have a neutral reference point I find that EQ settings tend to become less drastic and are often of the order of several dB or so. […] As a studio designer I feel it is my duty to provide a neutral reference point; you then need a good engineer with good ears – and one who listens!”

Kolbe was also an early user of quadratic residue diffusors. He designed and built custom units into recording studios and concert halls. For example, Kolbe used a low-frequency diffusor to control room modes in a tiny control room in Lucerne and converted a multipurpose space in Cham Switzerland into a concert hall with noise isolation.

From 1990, Kolbe used scale models to test his designs and documented their performance with TDS. Later, he adopted Ahnert and Feistel’s EASE (Enhanced Acoustic Simulator for Engineers), an industry standard for 3D electro-acoustic and room-acoustic modelling.

== Personal life ==
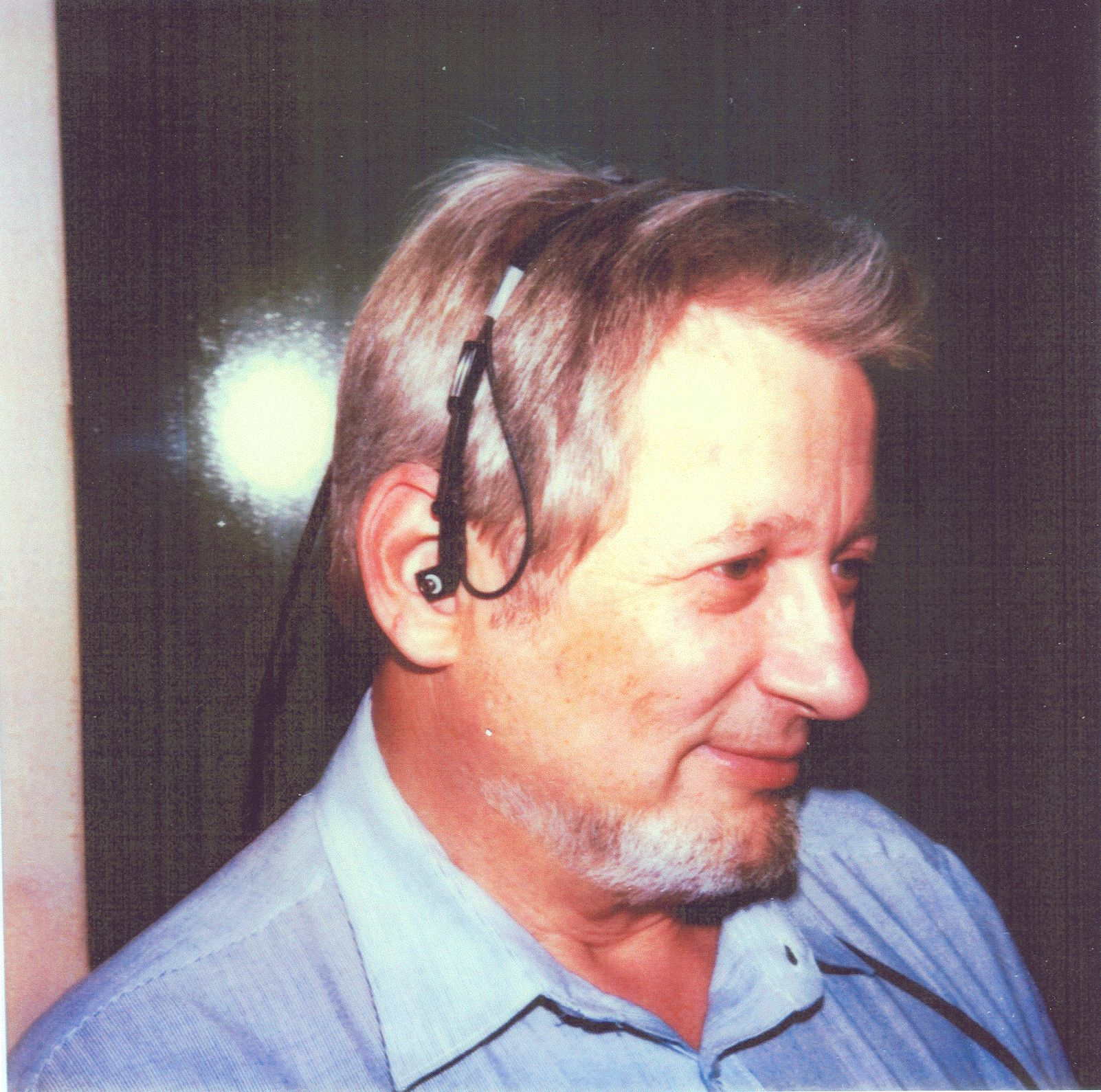
Kolbe about 1985–1990, probably with head-related ear-recording equipment for acoustic measurements. Picture courtesy Ursula Kolbe.

In 1960, Hellmuth Kolbe met Ursula Plischke-Delabro in Vienna, where she was working in a recording studio, and they married in 1966 and had two children.

Kolbe liked classical music and jazz, especially the music of Lennie Tristano (1919–1978). Kolbe had perfect pitch. He arranged music, particularly for jazz combos. Acoustics designer Sam Berkow, founder of SIA Acoustics LLC, said Kolbe picked out the individual frequencies of multi-note train horns.

During a recording session, Kolbe would make extensive notes on the musical performance, including the mistakes. This speeded his editing of the tapes. Kolbe was fluent in reading complex musical scores and always prepared himself carefully for a pending recording session.

Kolbe spent vacations skiing and mountaineering, occasionally by helicopter, and even at age 75. Visitors to his home in the 1980s were treated to a model train layout that ran both through his home (including tunnels built into walls) and through his garden. His trips to the US were punctuated by visits to jazz clubs and restaurants where he could enjoy spicy food from places such as Korea, Thailand, and China.

Hellmuth Kolbe was modest to a fault, rarely speaking of his accomplishments unless prodded to do so. Don Davis wrote, "We never knew him to ever be less than exact and his word on a matter was gold. Diogenes, the man with the lantern searching the world for an honest man, would have stopped with Hellmuth had he met him."

== Death ==
On 15 July 2002, Kolbe died in Zürich, Switzerland, at the age of 75. Kolbe posthumously received the Richard C. Heyser TEF Award "for his revolutionary work in the use of TDS in room acoustics and recording" in 2005.

== Selected works ==
=== As engineer/producer ===
- 1965 Carl Nielsen 100th birthday commemoration (CBS)
- 1966 8th Symphony Mahler, Leonard Bernstein and the London Symphony Orchestra, Walthamstow Assembly Hall, London. 18 to 20 April 1966. Echo and organ synchronisation at the Stadtkirche, Winterthur, Switzerland. Producer John McClure.
- 1967 Wozzeck Berg, Pierre Boulez and the Orchestre et Chœrs de L'Opera, Paris for CBS.
- 1966 Piano Trios, Op. 97, "Archduke." Beethoven, The Isaac Stern Trio for CBS.
- 1967 Autumn in New York Sonny Stitt.
- 1967 Entremont Plays the Chopin Walzes. Chopin, Philippe Entremont for CBS.
- 1968 Bartok and Stravinsky, Pierre Boulez and The BBC Symphony Orchestra for CBS.
- 1968 Symphony No. 9 in E minor Op. 95 "From the New World" Dvorak, Eugene Ormandy for CBS.
- 1968 The Glory of Gabrieli (Music for multiple choirs, brass and organ) Biggs for CBS.
- 1968 "Short Symphony, Dance Symphony" Copland, Aaron Copland and The London Symphony Orchestra for CBS.
- 1971 Entremont plays Chopin Philippe Entremont for CBS.
- 1971 Plays Bach in the Thomaskirche Biggs for CBS.
- 1973 Piano Trio in D minor Op. 63 Schubert, Arthur Rubinstein (piano), Henryk Szeryng (violin) and Pierre Fournier (cello). Victoria Hall, Geneva, Switzerland for RCA.
- 1973 A La Francaise: Debussy, Ravel, Chabrier, Satie, Fauré, Poulenc Phlippe Entremont for CBS.
- 1973 Baroque Masterpieces for Trumpet and Organ Nonesuch, Edward Tarr and George Kent.
- 1974 Orgelwerke mit Edward Power Biggs Biggs for CBS.
- 1974 The Four Great Toccatas And Fugues – The Four Aniphonal Organs of the Cathedral of Freiburg Played Simultaneously. Biggs for CBS.
- 1975 Requiem Berlioz, Leonard Bernstein and the Orchestra National de France.
- 1975 Swiss Nights vol 1 and 2 Dexter Gordon Quartett, Recorded at the 1975 Zürich Jazz Festival.
- 1975 Greatest Hits of the Piano Philippe Entremont, for CBS Harmony.
- 1975 Historic Organs of France Biggs for Columbia.
- Aaron Copland conducting his own music with The London Symphony Orchestra.
- Multiple recordings by Swiss organist Hans Vollenweider, and additional work with French composer Pierre Boulez.

=== With Karlheinz Stockhausen ===
- 1965 Klavierstücke I-XI for piano. Recorded at KGH (Kirchgemeindehaus), Winterthur, Switzerland.
- 1965 Mikrophonie I for tam-tam, two microphones and two filters (1964) Recorded at West German Radio Studios, Cologne.
- 1965 Mikrophonie II for 12 singers, 4 ring modulators and Hammond organ (1965) Recorded at West German Radio Studios, Cologne.

=== Acoustics, studio design ===
• Schweizerische Metallwerke AG (Metalworks), 4143 Dornach, Switzerland.

• The German parliament in Bonn, Germany (acoustic renovation).

• Rathaus (town hall) Zürich, Switzerland.

• IMAX theatre in the Swiss Museum of Transport, Lucerne, Switzerland.

• Two halls, Lake Zug, Switzerland.

• New Sound Studio, Pfäffikon, Switzerland.

• Studio 60. (No longer exists)

• Ebony Studio, Wohlen, Switzerland. (No longer exists)

• Theater Casino, Zug, Switzerland.

• Control room for SFB concert hall in Berlin, Germany.

• Concert Hall, Thun, Switzerland.

• AGV audio-visual studio, Bern, Switzerland.

• Reference control room for the East German broadcast organisation.

== See also ==
- Holenstein P. Die sprechenden Maschinen. 1996 Studer-Revox. Das Lebenswerk des Audiopioniers Willi Studer, Zürich.
- Prohs J. Time Delay Spectrometry: An Anthology of the Works of Richard C. Heyser on Measurement Analysis and Perception 1988 Audio Engineering Society Inc. New York.
- Spoerri B. Jazz in der Schweiz. 2005 Geschichte und Geschichten, Zürich.
- Schulz, Klaus, Jazz in Österreich. Eine Bildchronik mit Hörbeispielen, Vienna 2003. On page 57, Kolbe is listed as vibraphone player and Jazz expert, probably due to his lectures, his radio programs and his work as Jazz critic in Vienna.
- Oestreicher H. and Greve B. Leben mit Musik! 80 Jahre Schallplattengeschichte in Deutschland, Österreich und der Schweiz. 2010 Riedikon.
- Kolodin I. The White House Record Library, in Warren R. et al. The Phonograph and Sound Recording after One-Hundred Years. Centennial Issue, JAES, 1977 Vol 25 (10/11) p910.
