= Charlie Kulp =

American aerobatic pilot (1925–2021)

Charles Allen Kulp (September 20, 1925 – October 18, 2021), nicknamed the Flying Farmer, was an American aerobatic pilot. He performed a comedy aerobatic routine every Sunday at the Flying Circus Aerodrome in Bealeton, Virginia for 34 years.

== Biography ==
Kulp was born in Stafford, Virginia in September 1925 and was raised in Spotsylvania County. He was a Navy mechanic in the Pacific during World War II, and received his wings in July 1943 after taking lessons in Roanoke, Virginia. A former mechanic for Capital Airlines, Kulp managed small airports in Maryland and Virginia before joining the Flying Circus Airshow, of which he was a founding member. When not on the airshow circuit, Kulp performed on Sunday afternoons at the Flying Circus during its season from May to October until 2007, when he retired. Throughout his career as the "Flying Farmer," Kulp flew a standard 65 horsepower (48 kW) unmodified Piper J-3 Cub.

In 1993, Kulp took his act to Oshkosh, Wisconsin, for the "EAA Gateway to Aviation Classic", the largest airshow in the United States. In 2000, Charlie performed at "Sun ‘n’ Fun." As well as performing across the United States, Kulp has performed at civilian and military airshows in Great Britain and Canada. Throughout his career in aviation, Kulp appeared in several newspaper articles and has been featured on the Discovery Wings Channel. In addition to his airshow work, Kulp was a member of the Board of Directors for the Virginia Aviation Historic Society and an FAA-certified flight instructor. In 2000, Kulp received the Charles Taylor award from the FAA as a 50-year A&P mechanic.

On November 8, 1997, Kulp was inducted into the Virginia Aviation Hall of Fame. At 82 years of age, Kulp still flew his routine most Sundays at the Flying Circus. On October 28, 2007, Kulp flew his aerobatic comedy routine for the final time at the Flying Circus before retiring.

In his retirement years, Charlie lived in Manassas, Virginia with his companion of 30 years, and died on October 17, 2021, at the age of 96.
