= Kulp (surname) =

Kulp is a surname. Those bearing it include:

- Bob Kulp, American businessman and politician
- Charlie Kulp (1925–2021), United States airshow pilot
- Claude L. Kulp (1894–1969), United States educator and Cornell University professor
- Joshua Kulp (fl. 2000s), US-born Israeli Talmudic scholar and author
- J. Laurence Kulp (1921–2006), United States geochemist
- Marcus G. Kulp (born 1983), German singer and actor
- Monroe Henry Kulp (1858–1911), United States politician
- Nancy Kulp (1921–1991), United States film and television actress

== See also ==
- Culp
