= Kulp (band) =

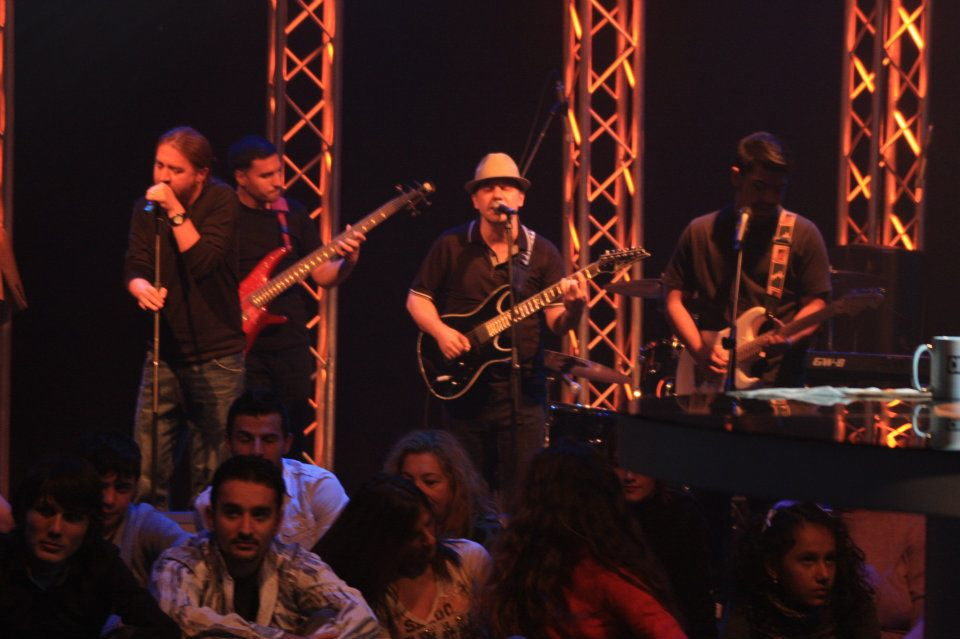
- Members of Kulp

Background information
- Origin: Turkey
- Genres: Rock
- Years active: 2007–present
- Labels: Şafak Karaman Production
- Members: Kerem Olgaç · Çağdaş Turan · Murat Altun · Ömer Cem Harnak · Onat Artun
- Past members: Serdar Seçme
- Website: kulponline.net

Kulp is a Turkish rock band formed in 2007.

In 2011, Kulp released a debut album titled "Kulp".

== Members ==
- Kerem Olgaç - Bass Guitar, Back vocal
- Çağdaş Turan - Vocal, Rhythm guitar
- Murat Altun - Drummer, percussion
- Ömer Cem Harnak - Lead Guitar
- Onat Artun - Organ

== Discography ==
Kulp (Sony Music) (2011)

1. "Anlatamam"
2. "Tül Perde"
3. "Yancı"
4. "Ayvalık Otogarı"
5. "Seni Aramam İçin"
6. "Beyoğlu"
7. "Gün Akşam Olduğunda"
8. "Sarı Sıcak Şehirlere Yolculuk"
9. "Yoruldum"
10. "Gecenin Karası"
11. "Beyoğlu (acoustic)"

Para Gani (Sony Music) (2013)

1. "Para Gani"
2. "Yalan Dünya"
3. "Yasak Aşk"
4. "Yine Geldim Bu Dünyaya"
5. "Tül Perde"
6. "Yine de"
7. "Sokak Çocuğu"
8. "Sorma"
9. "Bar Kuşu"
10. "Hacı"

== Video Clips ==
Ayvalık Otogarı
