= Abram Bowman Kolb =

American lyricist (1862–1925)

A B Kolb (1862-1925)

Phoebe Kolb

Abram Bowman ("A. B.") Kolb (1862–1925): teacher and publisher; born 10 November 1862 near Berlin (now Kitchener), Canada West, to Jacob Z. and Maria (Bowman) Kolb. Kolb is notable for editing Words of Cheer and Herald der Wahrheit. He also translated manuscripts including the Enchiridion of Anabaptist leader Dirk Philips, and Restitution by Henry Funk. He was the oldest son in a family of five sons and two daughters. On 3 January 1893, he married Phoebe Funk, the second daughter of John F. Funk. They had two daughters and two sons. Abram died 15 March 1925.
