= Culp =

Culp is a surname. Notable people bearing it include:

- Arlie F. Culp (1926–2017), American politician
- Benny Culp (1914–2000), American baseball player
- Connie Culp (1963–2020), the first United States recipient of a face transplant
- Curley Culp (1946–2021), American football player
- Dennis Culp (born 1970), American trombonist, singer, and songwriter
- Devin Culp (born 2000), American football player
- Faye Culp (born 1939), American politician
- Jonathan Culp (born 1971), Canadian underground filmmaker
- Julia Culp (1880–1970), Dutch mezzo-soprano
- Oveta Culp Hobby (1905–1995), U.S. public official and newspaper publisher
- Ray Culp (born 1941), American baseball player
- Robert Culp (1930–2010), American actor
- Steven Culp (born 1955), American actor

== See also ==
- Culp, Alberta
- Culp Creek
- Kulp (surname)
