= Maurycy Gottlieb =

Polish-Jewish painter (1856–1879)

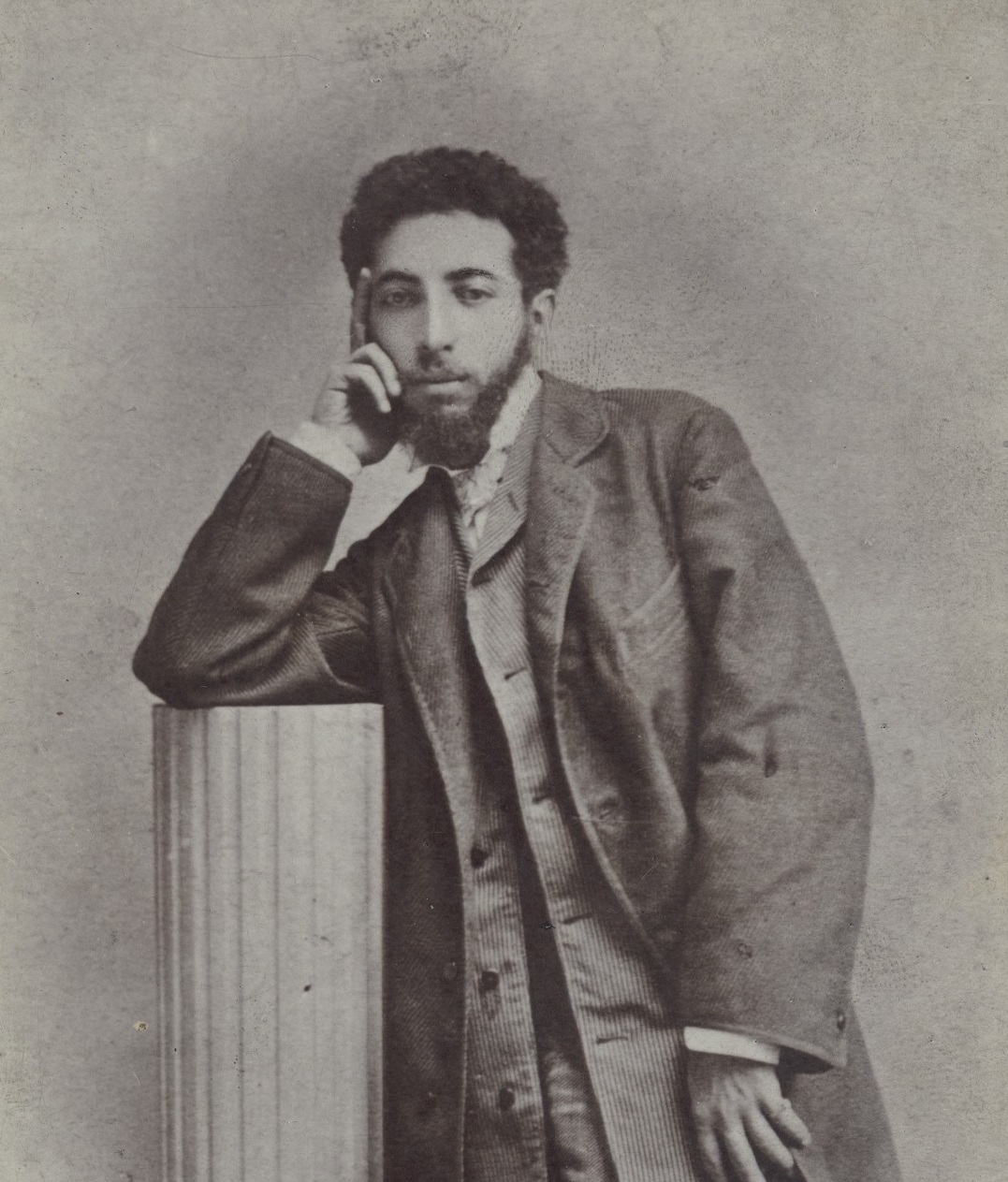
- Self-portrait, 1876
- Born: 21 February 1856; Drohobycz, Austrian Poland (now Drohobych, Ukraine)
- Died: 17 July 1879 (aged 23); Kraków, Austrian Poland
- Known for: Jews Praying in the Synagogue on Yom Kippur, 1878
- Movement: Realism

Maurycy Gottlieb (Polish pronunciation; 21 February 1856 – 17 July 1879) was a Polish-Jewish realist painter of the Romantic period. Considered one of the most talented students of Jan Matejko, Gottlieb died at the age of 23.

== Biography ==
Gottlieb was born in Drohobycz (then in Galicia in Austrian Poland, now in western Ukraine) to a wealthy, Yiddish and Polish-speaking Orthodox Jewish family.He was one of eleven children born to Fanya (née Tigerman) and Isaac Gottlieb. He was introduced to painting in Lemberg by Michał Godlewski. At fifteen, he enrolled at the Vienna Fine Arts Academy for three years. In 1873, he went to Kraków to study under Jan Matejko and became close friends with Jacek Malczewski. However, an anti-Semitic incident at the School of Fine Arts prompted him to leave Kraków after less than a year in spite of Malczewski's protests. He traveled to Norway and stayed in Molde. He returned to Vienna and from there travelled to Munich in 1875 to study under Karl von Piloty and Alexander von Wagner.

== Art career ==
In 1876, he won the gold medal at the Munich Academy for his painting, Shylock and Jessica. In the same year, he moved back to Vienna to attend the workshop of Heinrich von Angeli. He lived and worked in Vienna for the next two years and produced paintings with biblical themes, as well as illustrations for Friedrich Bruckmann Publishing of Munich.

In fall 1878, Gottlieb travelled to Rome, where he befriended Henryk Siemiradzki. At a banquet in his residence at Via Gaeta, Gottlieb met with Matejko, who convinced him to come back to Kraków as one of his best students, to work on a series of monumental paintings including scenes from the history of the Jews in Poland.

In 1879, Gottlieb settled in Kraków and began working on his new major project. He died in the same year from health complications. Matejko attended his funeral and promised his father to look after his younger brother Marcin.

Gottlieb won a gold medal at the Munich art competition for his painting, Shylock and Jessica (1876), portraying a scene from Shakespeare's The Merchant of Venice. The painting was exhibited in Lviv in 1877, and in 1878 at Zachęta in Warsaw and widely acclaimed. Gottlieb based Jessica's face on that of Laura Rosenfeld, to whom he had proposed marriage. However, Laura rejected his proposal and wed a Berlin banker. According to one biographer, when he heard about Rosenfeld's marriage, he purposely exposed himself to the elements and died of complications from a respiratory illness.Others cite different reasons for his death, including suicide.

Despite his premature death, more than three hundred works survive (mostly sketches, but also oil paintings), though not all are finished. After the fall of the Iron Curtain, many Polish collections unknown in the Western Bloc were popularized, and his reputation grew greatly. His brother, Leopold Gottlieb, was born five years after his death and became known as a painter as an adult.

== Selected works ==
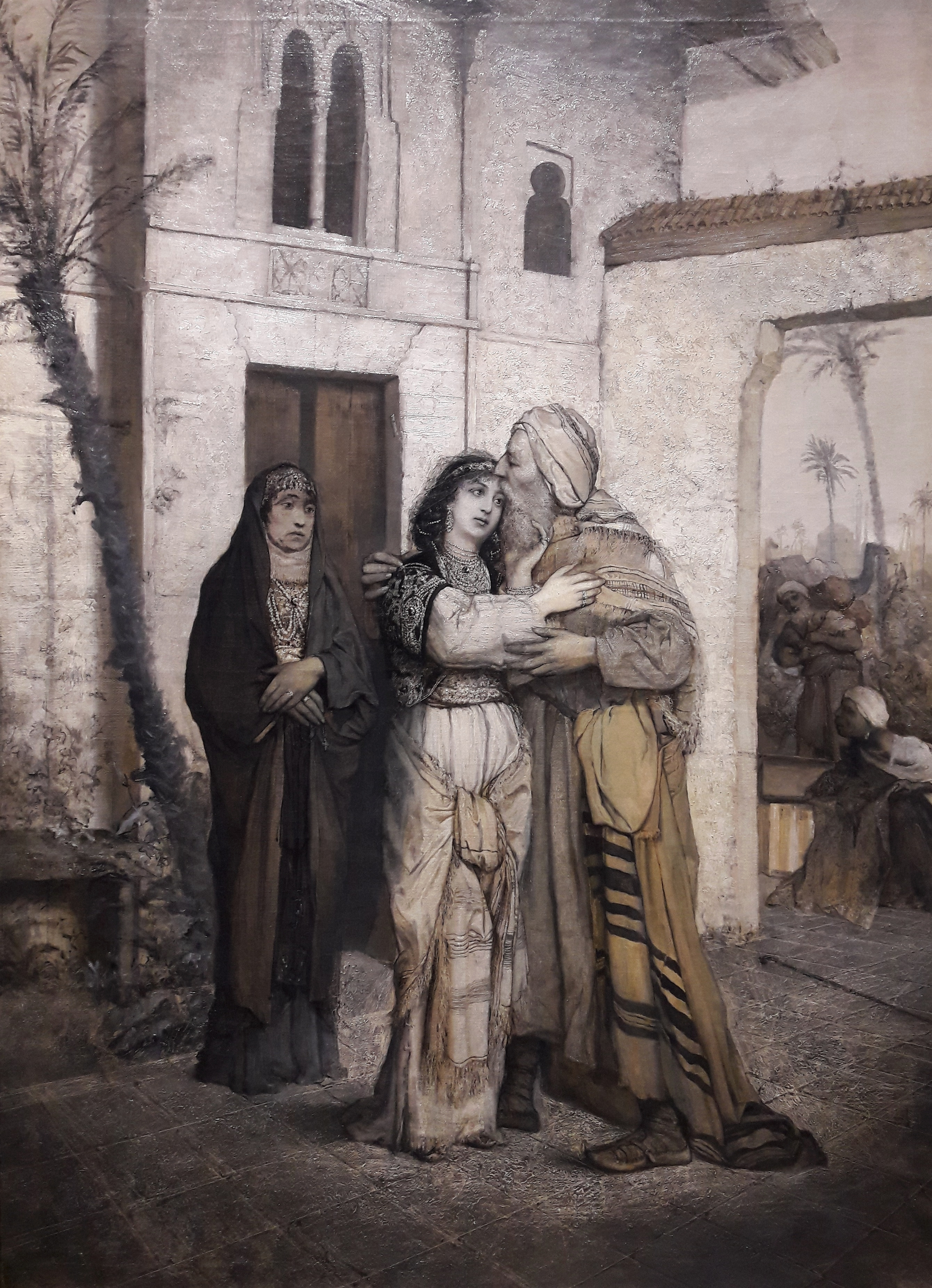
Recha welcoming her father, 1867–1877, National Museum of Warsaw

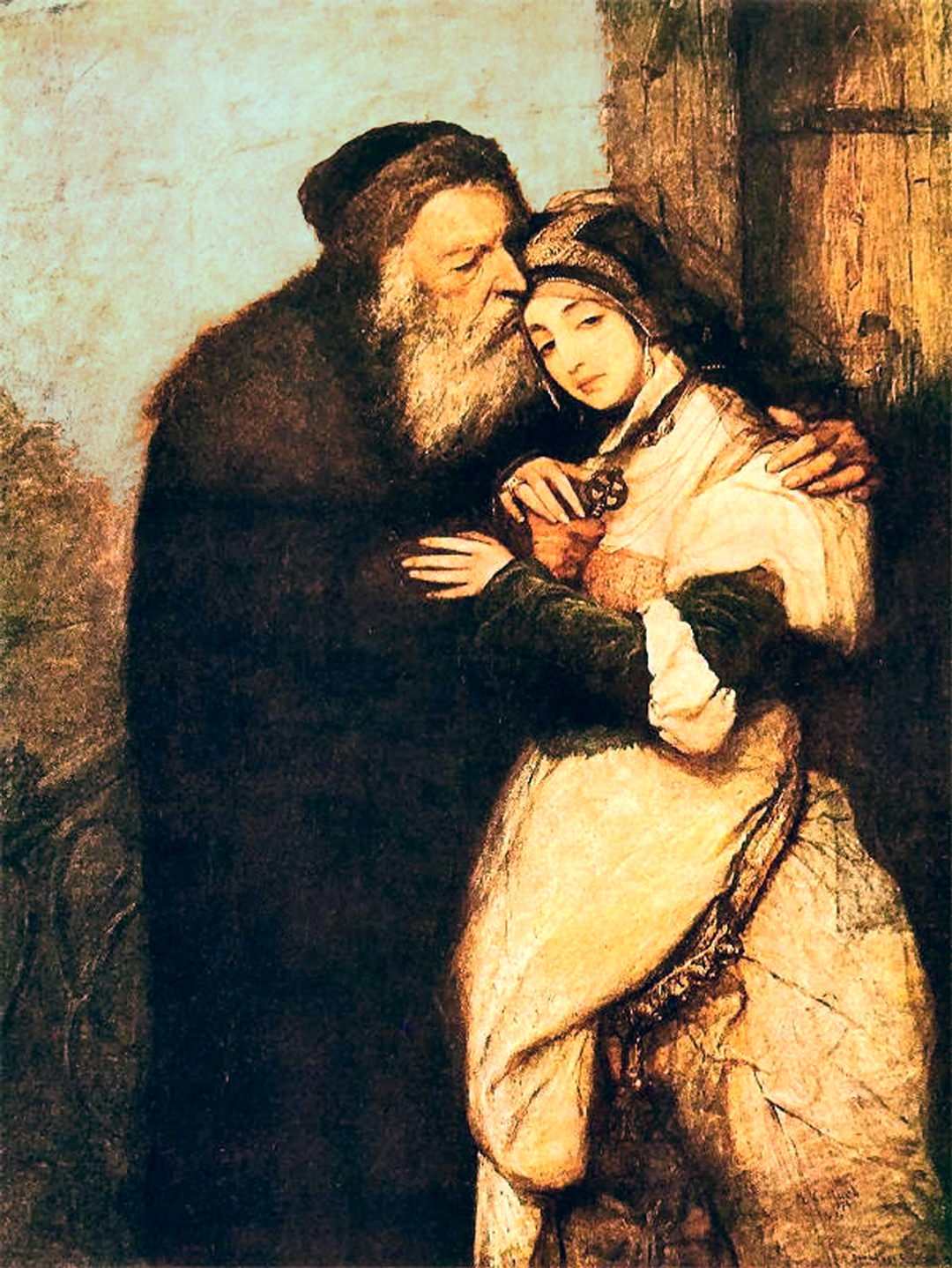
Shylock and Jessica, 1876

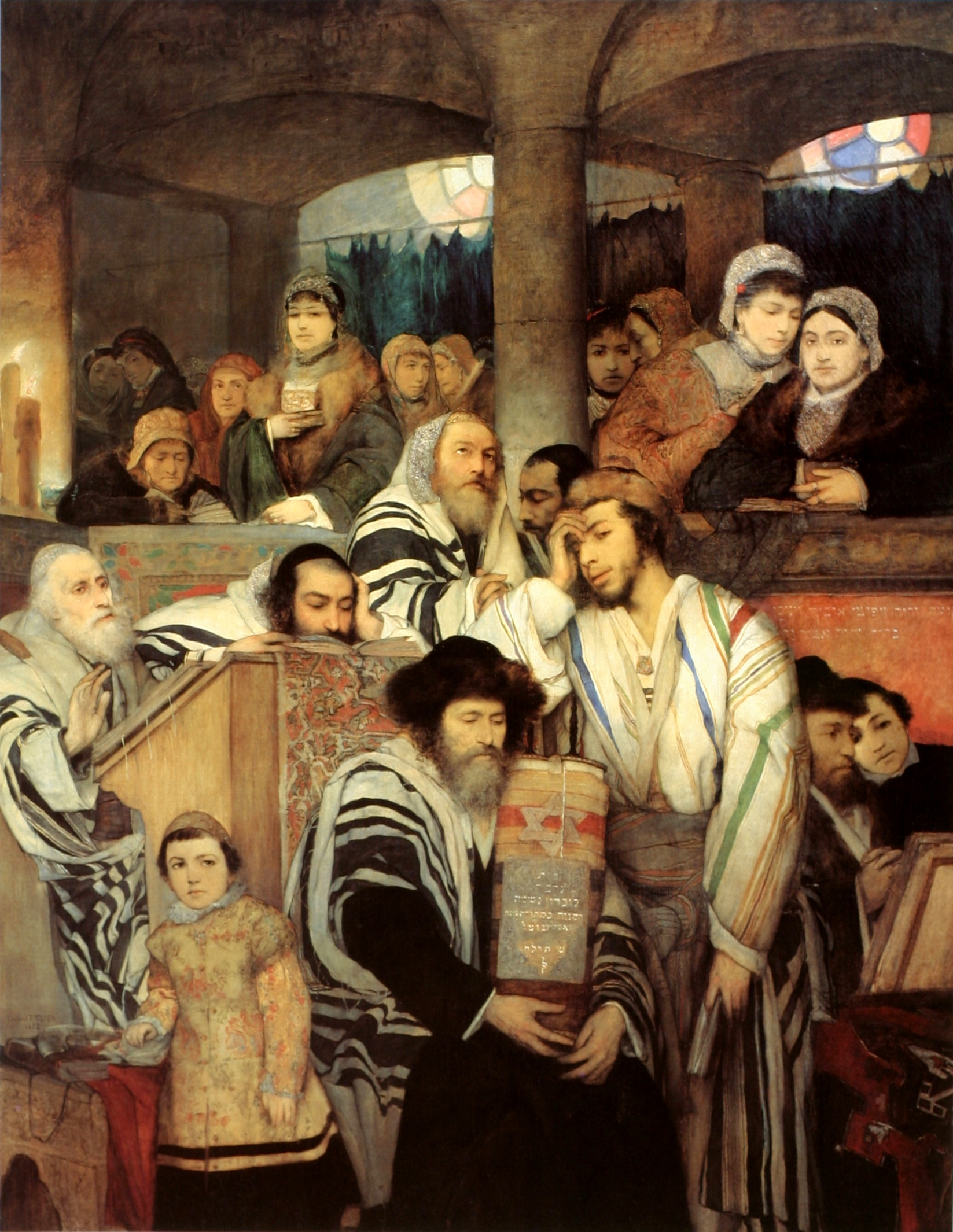
Jews Praying in the Synagogue on Yom Kippur, 1878, Tel Aviv Museum of Art

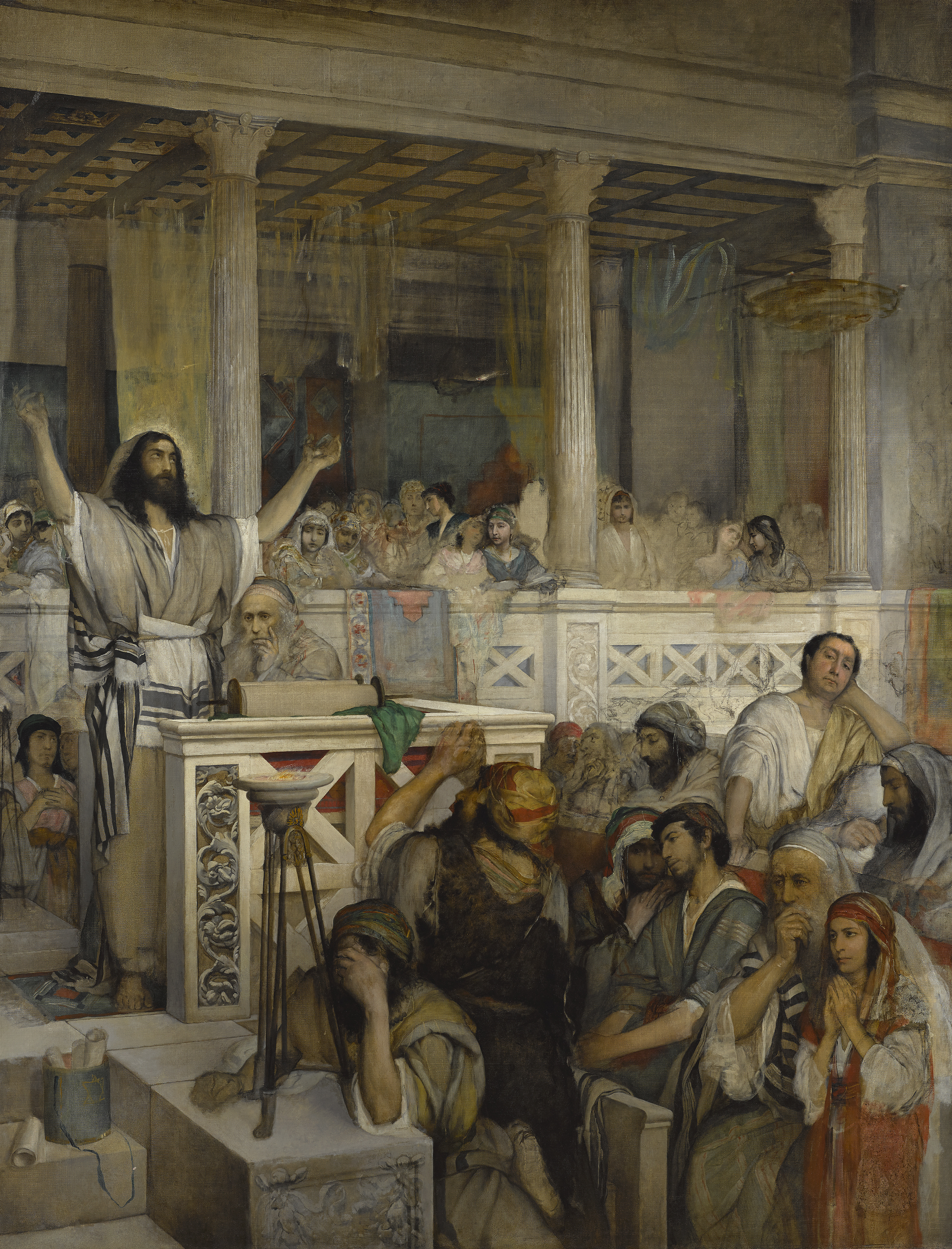
Christ Preaching at Capernaum, 1879 (Warsaw)

== Sources ==
- Małaszewska, Wanda (1996). "Gottlieb, Maurycy". In Jane Turner (ed.). The Dictionary of Art. Vol. 13. Macmillan Publishers Limited. pp. 215–6. ISBN 1-884446-00-0.
- Nehama Guralnik: In the Flower of Youth: Maurycy Gottlieb. Tel Aviv Museum of Art, Dvir Publishers, 1991.
- Jerzy Malinowski: Maurycy Gottlieb. Arkady, Warsaw (1997), ISBN 83-213-3891-7
- Ezra Mendelsohn: Painting a people: Maurycy Gottlieb and Jewish Art. Brandeis University Press, Hanover, New Hampshire; ISBN 1-58465-179-2 (2002)
