= List of Dokken band members =

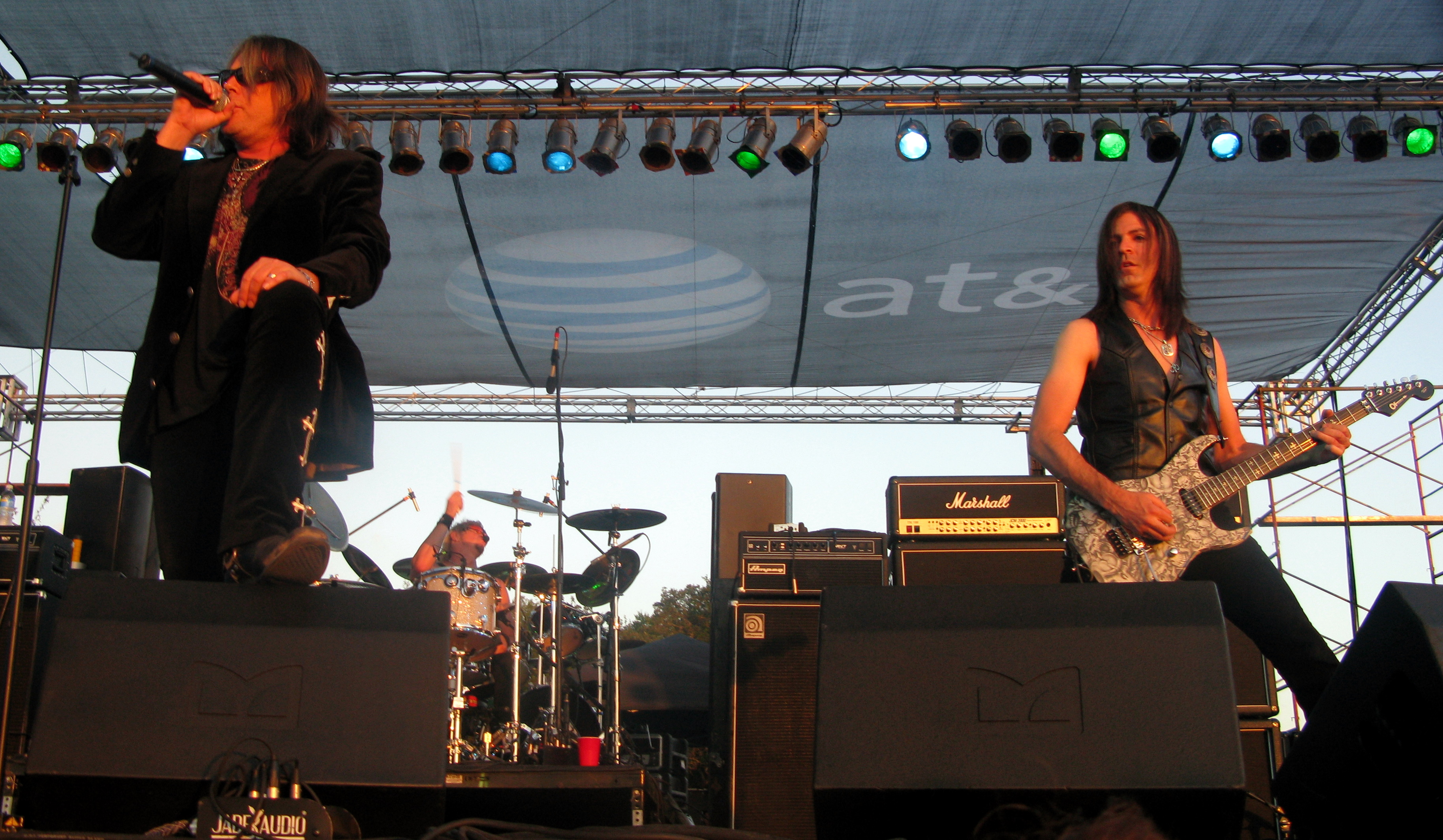
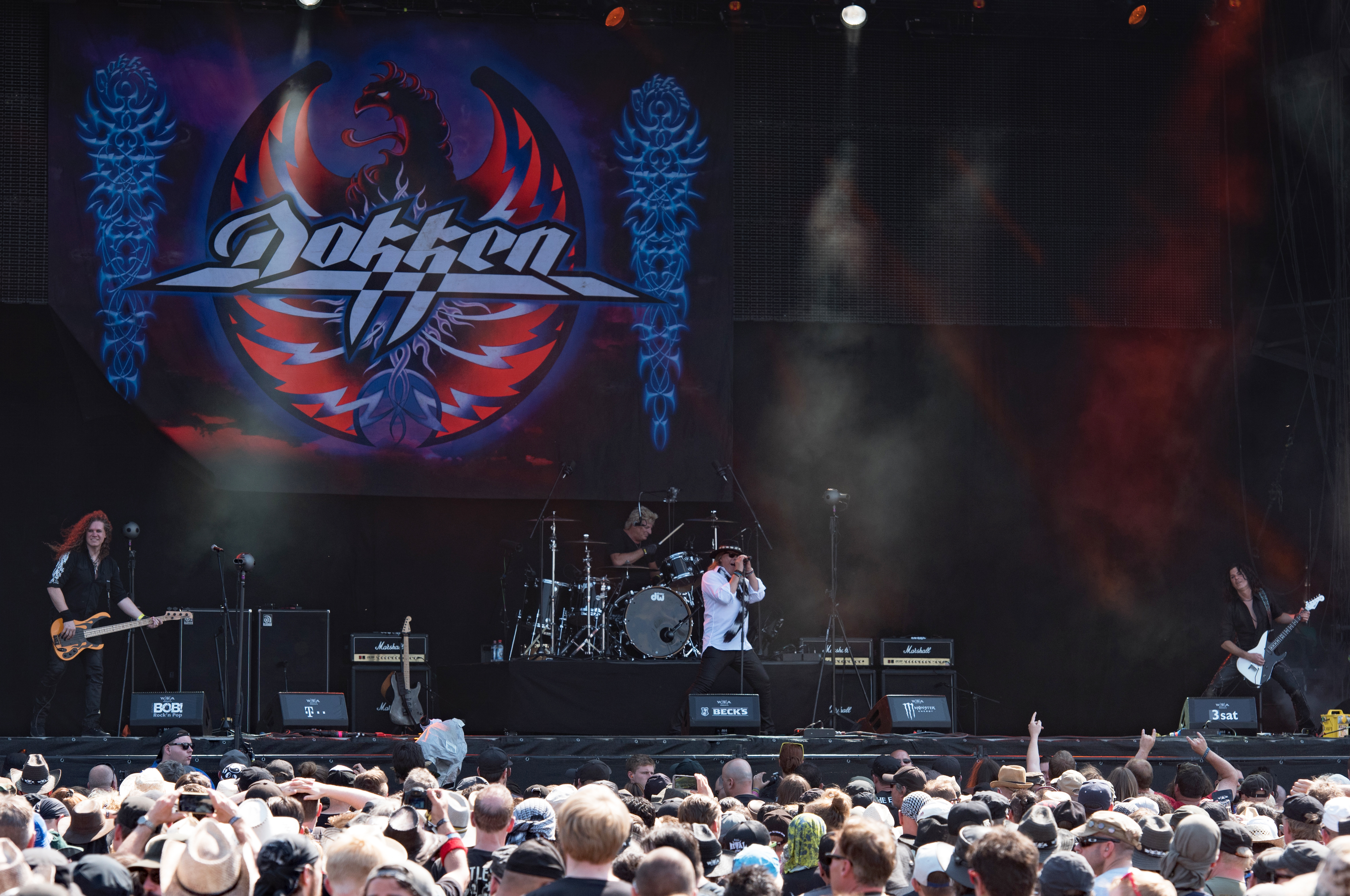
Dokken performing in 2008 and 2018

Dokken is an American heavy metal band from Los Angeles, California. Formed in 1976 as Airbourne, the group originally consisted of eponymous guitarist Don Dokken, lead vocalist Paul Goldwin, bassist Juan Croucier and drummer Bobby Blotzer.

By the time they recorded their debut album Breaking the Chains, the band's lineup featured of Don Dokken as lead vocalist/rhythm guitarist, lead guitarist George Lynch, bassist Juan Croucier and drummer Mick Brown.

Except eponymous vocalist, the current lineup of Dokken includes the guitarist Jon Levin (since 2003), bassist Chris McCarvill (since 2015) and drummer Bill "BJ" Zampa (since 2019).

== History ==
=== 1978–1983 ===
Don Dokken formed his eponymous band Dokken in October 1978, after two years fronting a group called "Airbourne". The outfit's first recording was the single "Hard Rock Woman", on which Robin Trower band members Rustee Allen (bass guitar) and Bill Lordan (drums) performed, as Dokken was yet to hire an official band. By the time the release was printed, bassist Steven R. Barry and drummer Greg Pecka had been brought in, so they were credited on the sleeve as band members. For the band's first tour in Germany the same year, Barry was replaced by Juan Croucier. The tour spawned recordings for the EP Back in the Streets, recording in October 1979 and was released in 1989.

A second German tour followed in October 1980, which featured a lineup of Dokken with lead guitarist Greg Leon, bassist Gary Link and drummer Gary Holland.

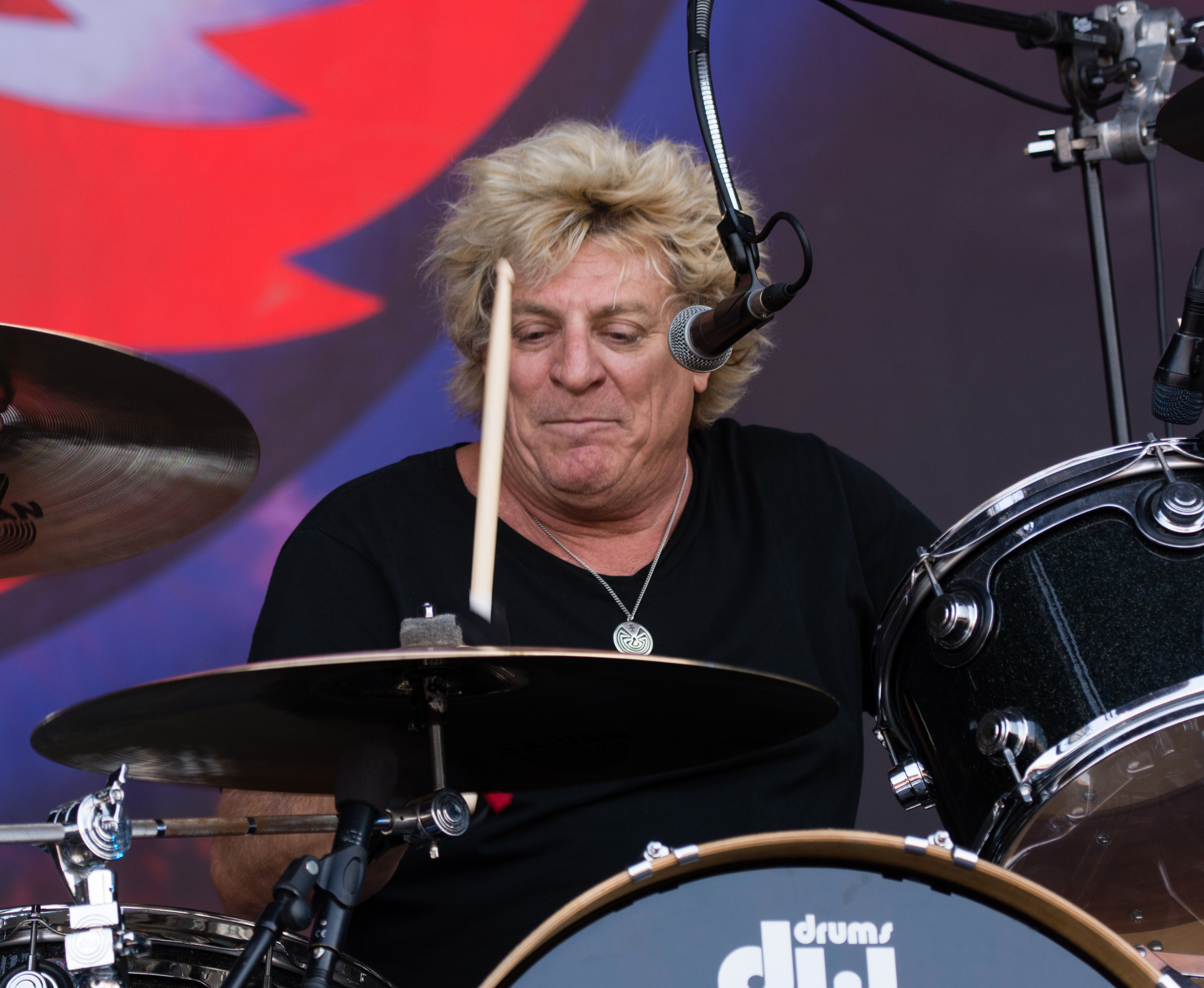
Mick Brown joined Dokken with George Lynch in 1981 and remained the band's drummer until 2019.

In April 1981, Croucier and Blotzer returned to Dokken. In July new guitarist George Lynch and drummer "Wild" Mick Brown of band "Xciter" was joined. After signing with Carrere Records, the band recorded its debut album Breakin' the Chains until September, which was initially credited to Don Dokken as a solo release. Bass on the album was performed by Accept's Peter Baltes, as Croucier reportedly "missed the deadline to get to Germany" for the sessions.

After its release, the band returned to the US and, according to Don Dokken, "For a year and a half, nothing happened" – Croucier joined Ratt, while Lynch and Brown returned to "Xciter".

In the summer of 1983, Breaking the Chains was re-recorded with Croucier and released on 18 September by Elektra/Asylum Records. A few month before its release, Croucier left to commit full-time to Ratt.

=== 1983–2002 ===
Croucier was replaced after the release of Breaking the Chains by Jeff Pilson. This lineup remained constant throughout the rest of the 1980s, releasing the band's most successful albums in Tooth and Nail, Under Lock and Key, Back for the Attack and Beast from the East.

In March 1989, however, the group broke up due to ongoing tensions between Dokken and Lynch. Dokken has claimed that Lynch's excessive drug use was the reason for the split, while the guitarist has blamed disagreements over financial arrangements for the breakup, claiming that the frontman "decided that he wanted it all, he didn't wanna share it with us".

In late 1994, Lynch was convinced to reunite with Dokken to complete a reformation of the band's previous lineup, adding lead guitar overdubs to a new album released the next year, Dysfunctional. However, after one more album, Shadowlife, Lynch left again in late 1997. He was replaced by former Europe guitarist John Norum, who joined partway through an American tour before the end of the year. By the next summer, former Winger and Alice Cooper guitarist Reb Beach had taken over the position. Beach recorded one studio album, Erase the Slate, before Norum returned in July 2001. The group started recording a new album, but in October 2001 it was announced that Pilson had been replaced for the sessions by bassist Barry Sparks, although this was initially not a full-time replacement. The following month, however, Don Dokken confirmed that Pilson had officially left to focus on his various other projects.

=== 2002–2016 ===
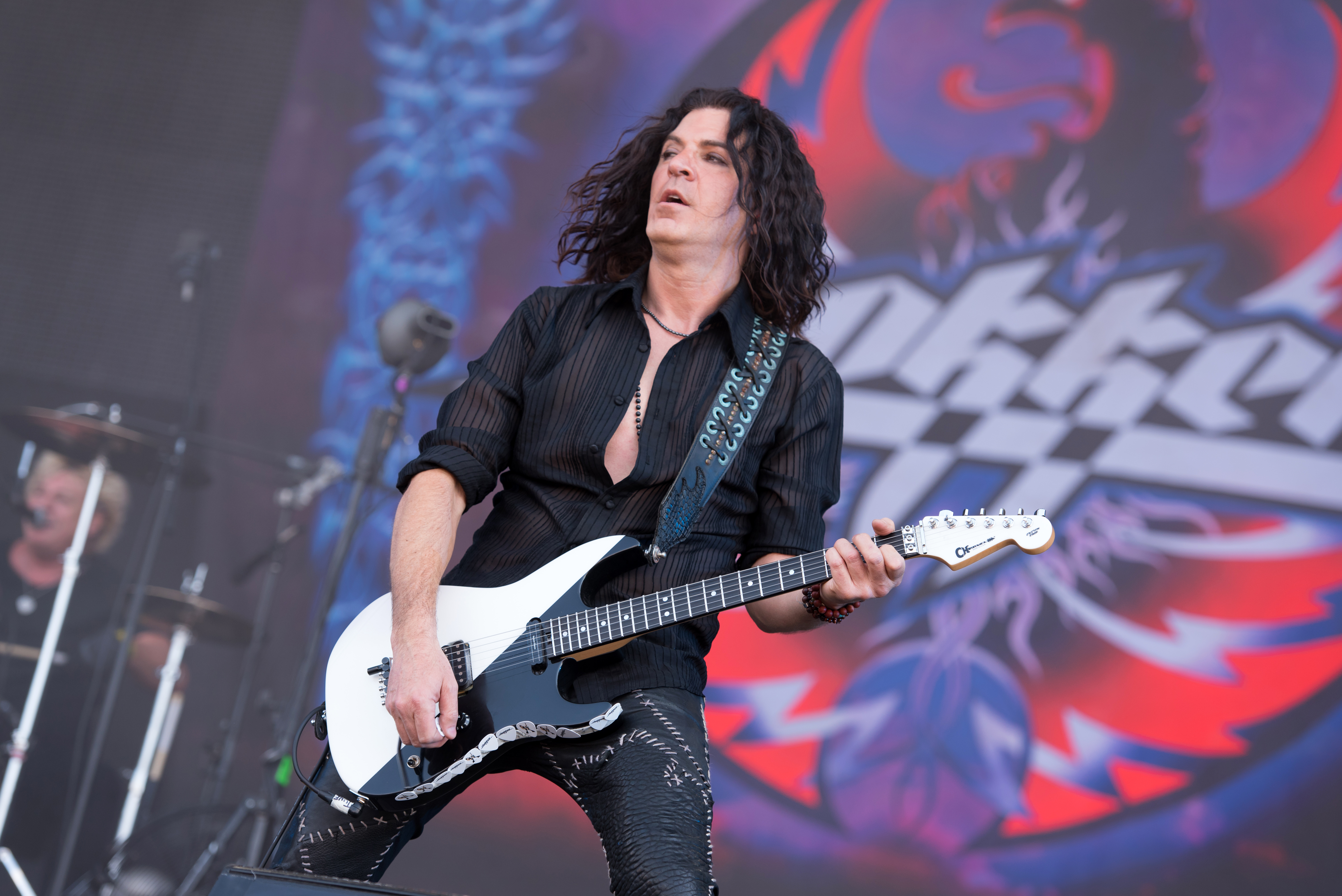
In late 2003, Jon Levin took over as Dokken lead guitarist, a position he still currently holds.

After the release of Long Way Home, John Norum left again in June 2002. Although his departure was initially credited to an injury, the guitarist later explained that it was due to tensions with Don Dokken, claiming that "he became this awful person that I didn't want to have anything to do with." Following Norum's second departure, the band was temporarily joined by Italian guitarist Alex De Rosso. The 2002 tour also saw drummer Mick Brown replaced for one show by Adam Hamilton of L.A. Guns due to a recurring shoulder injury. By late 2003, Dokken had a new full-time lead guitarist in Jon Levin, formerly of Warlock, who debuted on Hell to Pay in 2004.

Following the release and promotion of Lightning Strikes Again, Sparks temporarily left to tour with UFO in the summer of 2009, with former Great White bassist Sean McNabb taking his place. Early the next year, Sparks had to step back from his duties with both bands in order to take care of a family member. McNabb subsequently remained, debuting on the 2010 collection of re-recordings Greatest Hits. He also performed on 2012's Broken Bones, before being replaced in November 2014 by former Yngwie Malmsteen vocalist Mark Boals due to his inability to commit full-time to Dokken. Within a year, however, Boals had been replaced by Chris McCarvill.

=== Since 2016 ===
In June 2016, following months of rumours, it was announced that the "classic" Dokken lineup including guitarist George Lynch, bassist Jeff Pilson and drummer Mick Brown (still a regular member) were set to reunite for a short run of shows in Japan that October. Despite receiving offers to add more shows in various countries around the world, Don Dokken assured fans that a reunion would "never happen again" after the Japanese tour. Footage from one of the shows was later released as Return from the East Live (2016) in April 2018.

On May 7, 2019, Brown announced that he was "taking a break" from performing with Dokken. Within a couple of months of the announcement, Don Dokken added that Brown was permanently retiring, with his temporary replacement Bill "BJ" Zampa of House of Lords taking his place in the group. In 2020 the band released The Lost Songs: 1978–1981, on which Levin and Zampa performed some overdubs on old tracks.

== Members ==
=== Current ===
Image	Name	Years active	Instruments	Release contributions
	Don Dokken	1976–1982; 1983—1989; 1994–present	lead vocals; guitar (sole 1976–1980 and 1981; rhythm otherwise)	all releases
	George Lynch	1981–1982, 1983–1989; 1994–1997; 2016; 2020–present (touring guest)	lead guitar; rhythm guitar (1984—1989, 1995—1997, since 2020); backing vocals (1982, 2016)	all releases from Breakin' the Chains (1981) to Shadowlife (1997) & subsequent live albums
	Jon Levin	2003–present	lead guitar; backing vocals	Hell to Pay (2004); Lightning Strikes Again (2008); Greatest Hits (2010); Broken Bones (2012); The Lost Songs: 1978–1981 (2020); Heaven Comes Down (2023)
	Chris McCarvill	2015–present	bass guitar; backing vocals	Heaven Comes Down (2023)
	Bill "BJ" Zampa	2019–present (touring 2008–2010)	drums; backing vocals	The Lost Songs: 1978–1981 (2020); Heaven Comes Down (2023)

=== Former ===
Image	Name	Years active	Instruments	Release contributions
	Juan Croucier	1976–1977; 1977–1978; 1979–1980; 1981–1982; 1983	bass guitar; backing vocals; co-lead vocals (1982)	Back in the Streets (1979); Breaking the Chains (1983); The Lost Songs: 1978–1981 (2020)
	Bobby Blotzer	1976–1978; 1981	drums	Breakin' the Chains (1981) (tracks 6–8)
	Paul Goldwin	1976	lead vocals	none
	Jeff Tappen	1977	bass guitar	none
	Greg Pecka	1978–1980	drums	Back in the Streets (1979); The Lost Songs: 1978–1981 (2020)
	Steven R. Barry	1978–1979	bass guitar; backing vocals	none
	Gary Link	1980–1981	bass guitar	none
	Gary Holland	1980–1981	drums	none
	Greg Leon	1980	lead guitar	none
	Mick "Wild" Brown	1981–1982; 1983–1989; 1994–2019	drums; backing and occasional lead vocals	all releases from Breakin' the Chains (1981) to Return to the East Live (2016)
	Warren DeMartini	1982	guitar	Breakin' the Chains (1983) - track 10
	Jeff Pilson	1983–1989; 1994–2001; 2016	bass guitar; backing and occasional lead vocals; keyboards	all releases from Tooth and Nail (1984) to Live from the Sun (2000) & subsequent live albums
	John Norum	1997–1998; 2001–2002	lead and rhythm guitar; backing vocals	Long Way Home (2002)
	Reb Beach	1998–2001	lead and rhythm guitar; backing vocals	Erase the Slate (1999); Live from the Sun (2000)
	Barry Sparks	2001–2009	bass guitar; backing vocals; keyboards	Long Way Home (2002); Hell to Pay (2004); Lightning Strikes Again (2008); Greatest Hits (2010)
	Alex De Rosso	2002–2003	guitar	none
	Sean McNabb	2009–2014	bass guitar; backing vocals	Greatest Hits (2010) – two bonus tracks; Broken Bones (2012)
	Mark Boals	2012; 2014–2015	backing vocals; bass guitar (2014–2015)	Broken Bones (2012); Heaven Comes Down (2023)

=== Touring ===
Image	Name	Years active	Instruments	Details
	Mikkee D	2001	bass guitar	Mikkee stood in for Jeff Pilson, who was working on solo material, at the Sweden Rock Festival in 2001.
	Adam Hamilton	2002	drums	Hamilton substituted for Mick Brown for one show in the summer of 2002 due to a recurring shoulder injury.
	Greg Smith	2003	bass guitar; backing vocals	Smith filled in for Barry Sparks, who was busy fulfilling other tour commitments, on several occasions.
	Frankie Banali	2004	drums	
	K.J. Hunter	2006	drums	One-off show in 2006 at the House of Blues.
	Vik Foxx	2007	drums	
	Jeff Martin	2008	drums; backing vocals	Martin and Marks each filled in for Mick Brown during Dokken's touring in the summer of 2008.
	Bobby Marks	2008	drums	Martin and Marks each filled in for Mick Brown during Dokken's touring in the summer of 2008.
	Jimmy DeGrasso	2012	drums	DeGrasso temporarily took over from Mick Brown during the summer of 2012, as he was touring with Ted Nugent.
	Jack Russell	2017	lead vocals	Russell made a guest appearance on "Alone Again" at Dokken's M3 Rock Festival performance in April 2017.
	Ira Black	2017	lead guitar	Black temporarily substituted for regular guitarist Jon Levin during a tour in November and December 2017.

=== Session ===
Image	Name	Years active	Instruments	Release contributions
	Bill Lordan	1978	drums	"Hard Rock Woman" (1979); The Lost Songs: 1978–1981 (2020)
	Rustee Allen	1978	bass guitar	"Hard Rock Woman" (1979); The Lost Songs: 1978–1981 (2020)
	Peter Baltes	1981	bass guitar	Breakin' the Chains (1981)

== Lineups ==
Period	Members	Releases
1976 (as "Airborne")	Paul Goldwin — lead vocals; Don Dokken – guitar; Juan Croucier – bass guitar, backing vocals; Bobby Blotzer – drums	none
1976 – 1977	Don Dokken – lead vocals, guitar; Juan Croucier – bass guitar, backing vocals; Bobby Blotzer – drums	none
1977	Don Dokken – lead vocals, guitar; Jeff Tappen – bass guitar; Bobby Blotzer – drums	none
1977 – September 1978	Don Dokken – lead vocals, guitar; Juan Croucier – bass guitar, backing vocals; Bobby Blotzer – drums	none
October 1978 (temporary recording lineup (session); as solo artist)	Don Dokken – lead vocals, guitar; Rustee Allen – bass guitar; Bill Lordan – drums	"Hard Rock Woman" (1978)
October 1978 – June 1979	Don Dokken – lead vocals, guitar; Steven R. Barry – bass guitar, backing vocals; Greg Pecka – drums	none
July 1979 – September 1980	Don Dokken – lead vocals, guitar; Juan Croucier – bass guitar, backing vocals; Greg Pecka – drums	The Lost Songs: 1978–1981 (2020) – two previously unreleased live recordings; Back in the Streets (1989)
October – December 1980	Don Dokken – lead vocals, rhythm guitar; Greg Leon – lead guitar; Gary Link – bass guitar; Gary Holland – drums	none
January – March 1981	Don Dokken – lead vocals, guitar; Gary Link – bass guitar; Gary Holland – drums	none
April – June 1981	Don Dokken – lead vocals, guitar; Juan Croucier – bass guitar; Bobby Blotzer – drums	Breakin' the Chains (1981) (2 tracks)
July – September 1981	Don Dokken – lead vocals, rhythm guitar; George Lynch – lead guitar; Peter Baltes – bass guitar (session); Mick Brown – drums, backing vocals	Breakin' the Chains (1981) (6 tracks)
November 1981 – May 1982 (as "Dokken")	Don Dokken – lead vocals, rhythm guitar; guitar (January—February 1982); George Lynch – lead guitar; guitar, backing vocals (January—February 1982); Juan Croucier – bass guitar, backing vocals; co-lead vocals (January—February 1982); Mick Brown – drums, backing vocals	Breakin' the Chains (1981) (2 tracks); Complete Beat Club 1982 (2018)
Band inactive May – October 1982
October – December 1982	Don Dokken – lead vocals; Warren DeMartini – guitar; Juan Croucier – bass guitar, backing vocals; Mick Brown – drums	Breaking the Chains (1983) (track 10)
January – October 1983	Don Dokken – lead vocals, rhythm guitar; George Lynch – lead guitar; Juan Croucier – bass guitar, backing vocals; Mick Brown – drums, backing vocals	Breaking the Chains (1983) (re-recorded)
October 1983 – March 1989	Don Dokken – lead vocals, rhythm guitar (until December 1983); George Lynch – guitar; Jeff Pilson – bass guitar, backing vocals; Mick Brown – drums, backing vocals (until November 1983, since March 1985)	Tooth and Nail (1984); Under Lock and Key (1985); Back for the Attack (1987); Beast from the East (1988); From Conception: Live 1981 (2007)
Band inactive March 1989 – March 1990
March – April 1990 (as solo artist)	Don Dokken – lead vocals, occasional guitars; Billy White – guitar; John Norum – guitar, backing vocals; Peter Baltes – bass guitar, backing vocals; Hempo Hilden – drums	none
April 1990 – December 1991	Don Dokken – lead vocals, occasional guitars; Billy White – guitar; John Norum – guitar, backing vocals; Peter Baltes – bass guitar, backing vocals; Mikkey Dee – drums	Up from the Ashes (1990)
Band inactive December 1991 – mid 1993
Mid 1993 – November 1994	Don Dokken – lead vocals, guitar; Jeff Pilson – bass guitar, backing vocals; Mick Brown – drums, backing vocals	none
December 1994 – August 1997	Don Dokken – lead vocals, rhythm guitar (until March 1995); George Lynch – guitar; Jeff Pilson – bass guitar, backing vocals; Mick Brown – drums, backing vocals	Dysfunctional (1995); One Live Night (1996); Shadowlife (1997); Japan Live '95 (2003)
September 1997 – August 1998	Don Dokken – lead vocals; John Norum – guitar, backing vocals; Jeff Pilson – bass guitar, backing vocals; Mick Brown – drums, backing vocals	none
August 1998 – June 2001	Don Dokken – lead vocals, rhythm guitar (since November 1999); Reb Beach – lead guitar, backing vocals; rhythm guitar (until October 1999); Jeff Pilson – bass guitar, backing vocals; Mick Brown – drums, backing vocals	Erase the Slate (1999); Live from the Sun (2000)
June 2001 – June 2002	Don Dokken – lead vocals, rhythm guitar; John Norum – lead guitar, backing vocals; Barry Sparks – bass guitar, backing vocals; Mick Brown – drums, backing vocals	Long Way Home (2002)
June 2002 – March 2003	Don Dokken – lead vocals, rhythm guitar; Alex De Rosso – lead guitar, backing vocals; Barry Sparks – bass guitar, backing vocals; Mick Brown – drums, backing vocals	none
March 2003 – February 2009	Don Dokken – lead vocals, rhythm guitar; Jon Levin – lead guitar, backing vocals; Barry Sparks – bass guitar, backing vocals; Mick Brown – drums, backing vocals	Hell to Pay (2004); Lightning Strikes Again (2008); Greatest Hits (2010)
February 2009 – October 2014	Don Dokken – lead vocals, rhythm guitar; Jon Levin – lead guitar, backing vocals; Sean McNabb – bass guitar, backing vocals; Mick Brown – drums, backing vocals	Greatest Hits (2010) – two bonus tracks; Broken Bones (2012)
November 2014 – February 2015	Don Dokken – lead vocals, rhythm guitar; Jon Levin – lead guitar, backing vocals; Mark Boals – bass guitar, backing vocals; Mick Brown – drums, backing vocals	none
February 2015 – August 2016	Don Dokken – lead vocals, rhythm guitar; Jon Levin – lead guitar, backing vocals; Chris McCarvill – bass guitar, backing vocals; Mick Brown – drums, backing vocals	none
September — October 2016 (special reunion tour)	Don Dokken – lead vocals, rhythm guitar; George Lynch – lead guitar, backing vocals; Jeff Pilson – bass guitar, backing vocals; Mick Brown – drums, backing vocals	Return to the East Live (2016) (2018)
November 2016 – May 2019	Don Dokken – lead vocals, rhythm guitar; Jon Levin – lead guitar, backing vocals; Chris McCarvill – bass guitar, backing vocals; Mick Brown – drums, backing vocals	
May 2019 – present	Don Dokken – lead vocals, rhythm guitar (until October 2019); George Lynch – guitar (touring, since 2020); Jon Levin – guitar, backing vocals; Chris McCarvill – bass guitar, backing vocals; Bill "BJ" Zampa – drums	The Lost Songs: 1978–1981 (2020) – overdubs by Levin and Zampa; Heaven Comes Down (2023)
