= When He Came =

Studio album by Martha Munizzi
- Released: October 19, 2004
- Genre: CCM
- Label: Sony

Martha Munizzi chronology
The Best Is Yet to Come (2003)	When He Came (2004)	No Limits Live (2006)

When He Came is a Christmas album from Christian singer Martha Munizzi. The album was released on October 19, 2004.

== Track listing ==
All songs written by Martha Munizzi, except where noted.

1. "O Come, O Come Emmanuel" (Public domain) – 03:57
2. "O Little Town Of Bethlehem" (Phillips Brooks, Lewis Redner) – 04:06
3. "White Christmas" (Israel Houghton, Munizzi) – 05:02
4. "O Come All Ye Faithful" (Frederick Oakeley, John Francis Wade) – 03:51
5. "His Name Shall Be Called" (Munizzi, Marvelyne R.) – 04:14
6. "When He Came" (Mary Alessi, Munizzi) – 05:01
7. "Silent Night/Away In A Manger" (Franz Gruber, James R. Murray, Joseph Mohr) – 05:53
8. "What Child Is This?" (William Chatterton Dix) - 03:58
9. "Peace On Earth" (Aaron Lindsey, Adrian Lindsey, Munizzi) - 04:55
10. "My Only Wish" (Aaron Pearce) - 04:38

== Awards ==
When He Came was nominated to a Dove Award for Contemporary Gospel Album of the Year at the 37th GMA Dove Awards.

== Chart performance ==
The album peaked at the following charts:

- #22 on Billboard's Christian Albums
- #5 on Billboard's Gospel Albums
- #28 on Billboard's Heatseekers
- #32 on Billboard's Independent Albums
