= Change the World (disambiguation) =

"Change the World" is a song by Eric Clapton.

Change the World may also refer to:

- "Change the World", a song by Westlife from Westlife
- Change the World (Dawnstar EP), 2007
- Change the World (Martha Munizzi album), 2008
- Change the World (Ringo Starr EP), 2021
- Change the World: An Introduction, by Dokken
- "Change the World" (P.O.D. song), 2003
- "Change the World" (V6 song), 2000
- "Change the World", by Juliana Hatfield from the album There's Always Another Girl
- "Change the World", by The Offspring from the album Ixnay on the Hombre
- "Change the World", by Your Memorial from the album Redirect
- "Change the World", a non-album single by the Housemartins and Dino Lenny, 2003
- "Change the World", by Bone Thugs-n-Harmony from the album BTNHRESURRECTION

== See also ==
- L: Change the World, a 2008 film in Death Note comic and animation franchise
- Change the World Without Taking Power, a 2002 book by activist John Holloway
