= Limitless =

Limitless may refer to:

== Arts and entertainment ==
- Limitless (book), the republished title of the novel The Dark Fields
  - Limitless (film), a 2011 film based on the book
  - Limitless (TV series), a 2015 American television series based on the film
- "Limitless", a sculpture by Avtarjeet Singh Dhanjal

=== Music ===
==== Albums ====
- Limitless (Crown the Empire EP), 2011
- Limitless (NCT 127 EP), 2017
- Limitless (Planetshakers album), 2013
- Limitless (Temperance album), 2015 (or its title song)
- Limitless (Tonight Alive album), 2016
- Limitless (The Piano Guys album), 2018
- Limitless, a 2020 album by Richard Marx

==== Songs ====
- "Limitless (Burns song)", a 2013 song performed by British record producer Burns
- "Limitless (Megan Washington song)", a 2014 single by Megan Washington
- "Limitless (Jennifer Lopez song)", a 2018 song performed by American singer Jennifer Lopez
- "Limitless", a 2012 song by French singer Nolwenn Leroy on her album Ô Filles de l'eau
- "Limitless", a 2020 song by American band Bon Jovi on their album Bon Jovi: 2020
- "Limitless", a 2017 song by Korean band NCT 127 from the album of the same name

== People ==
- Wiktor Malinowski (born 1994), Polish professional poker player who plays online under the alias "limitless"

== Transportation ==
- Limitless (luxury yacht), one of the world's largest private superyachts
- Limitless Airways, a charter airline based in Croatia

== See also ==
- Aditi, Sanskrit for "not (a) bound (diti)" or without limits
- Ein Sof, Hebrew for "unending" or without limits
- Limit (disambiguation)
- Limited (disambiguation)
- Unlimited (disambiguation)
