= No Limits =

No Limits may refer to:

== Books ==
- No Limits: The Will to Succeed, a 2008 biography of Michael Phelps

== Film, television, and video games ==
- Need for Speed: No Limits, a 2015 mobile racing game in the Need for Speed franchise
- No Limits (Australian TV series)
- No Limits (Singaporean TV series), a 2010 Singaporean Chinese-language drama series
- No Limits (British TV series), a 1985–1987 British television programme that aired on BBC Two
- NoLimits, a software package for roller coaster simulation
- No Limits (FIRST), 2004-05 FIRST Lego League game

== Music ==
- No Limits (2 Unlimited album), 1993
- No Limits (Labyrinth album), 1996
- No Limits (Jay Perez album), 1996
- No Limits (U.D.O. album), 1998
- No Limits (Reset album), 1999
- No Limits (Martha Munizzi album), 2006
- No Limits (EP), a 2014 EP by Boyce Avenue
- "Interlude: No Limits", a track by Solange from the 2016 album A Seat at the Table

== Sports ==
- No Limits FC, a Lebanese women's football club

== See also ==
- No Limit (disambiguation)
