= More (Mary Alessi album) =

Live album by Mary Alessi
- Released: July 19, 2005
- Recorded: Covenant Church, Dallas, Texas
- Genre: Gospel; Inspirational
- Label: Miami Life Sounds
- Producer: Stephen Alessi; Aaron Lindsey

Mary Alessi chronology
Whatever It Takes	More	When Women Worship

More is a gospel album by Mary Alessi which was recorded at the Covenant Church in Dallas, Texas and released on July 19, 2005.

== Track listing ==
1. "Pastor Mike Hayes introduction" (Mike Hayes) - 01:40
2. "Again I Say Rejoice" (Israel Houghton, Aaron Lindsey) - 04:32
3. "Praise the Lord" (Mary Alessi, Lindsey) - 04:53
4. "You've Made Me Glad" (Houghton, Lindsey, Cindy Cruse Ratcliff) - 04:36
5. "With My Whole Heart" (Alessi) - 04:35
6. "Filled With Your Spirit" (Alessi, Lindsey) - 04:21
7. "So We Lift" (Lindsey, Adrian Lindsey, Houghton) - 08:24
8. "More" (Alessi, Martha Munizzi) - 07:24
9. "I Worship You With All of Me" (Alessi, Munizzi) - 05:29
10. "Pray" (Alessi) - 05:33
11. "Another Breakthrough" (Houghton, Lindsey) - 04:24
12. "New Day Dawning" (Alessi) - 03:58
13. "Lord of the Breakthrough" (Houghton, Lindsey) - 05:36
14. "Pastor Mike Hayes Spoken Word" (Hayes) - 04:48
15. "In Him I Live" (Alessi, Lindsey, Houghton) - 04:57

== Personnel ==
- Aaron Lindsey - Piano, Keys, Programming & Vocals
- Jerry Harris - Organ and pro Tools Editing
- Christopher Coleman - Drums
- Terrance Palmer - Bass
- Israel Houghton - Electric & Acoustic Guitar, Lead Vocals on You've Made Me Glad"
- Natural - Guitar on "You've Made Me Glad"
- Phillip Lassiter - Horn Arrangements (Praise the Lord, Made Me Glad, In Him), Trumpet Solo (In Him)
- Keith Jourdan - Trumpet
- Freddie Morgan - Trumpet
- Keith Anderson - Sax
- Tom Lauer - Sax
- Brad Herring - Trombone
- Carl Murr - Trombone
- Daniel Johnson - Vocals
- Arthur Dyer - Vocals
- Jamil Whiting - Vocals
- Lacy Edly - Vocals
- Stacey Joseph - Vocals
- Joyce Halbert - Vocals
- Stephanie Alessi - Vocals on "Pray"
- Covenant Church Choir - Vocals

== Certification and Chart Success ==
More peaked at #44 on Billboard magazine's Top Gospel Album.
