= My Favourite Hits =

My Favourite Hits may refer to:

- My Favourite Hits (Hariharan album), 1990
- My Favourite Hits, a compilation album by Miriam Yeung

== See also ==
- My Favourites, a 1999 greatest hits album by Sandra
