= Limited =

Limited may refer to:

== Arts and media ==
- Limited Inc, a 1988 book by Jacques Derrida
- Limited series (comics), a comic book series with predetermined length

== Businesses ==
- Limited Brands, an American company - owners of Victoria's Secret, Bath & Body Works and others
- The Limited, an American apparel company

== Legal corporate structures ==
- Limited company, a company in which the liability of its members is limited to what they have invested in it
- Limited liability company, a limited company that blends elements of partnership and corporate structures - primarily in the United States
- Private company limited by shares, a limited company whose shares are not public - primarily in Commonwealth countries
- Private company limited by guarantee, primarily for non-profit organisations - in Britain and Ireland
- Public limited company, a limited company whose shares are sold to the public - primarily in Commonwealth countries
- Limited partnership, a partially limited company where liability is limited for limited partners, but not general partners
- Limited liability partnership, generally a limited company where liability is limited for all partners
- Limited liability limited partnership, a limited company where liability is limited for all partners - United States

== Transport ==
- Buick Limited, a car produced between 1936 and 1942 and during 1958
- Limited express, a type of train service
- Limited, a high-end trim for vehicles of any kind

== See also ==
- Limit (disambiguation)
- Limitless (disambiguation)
- Unlimited (disambiguation)
- Limited Edition (disambiguation)
