= Miriam Yeung discography =

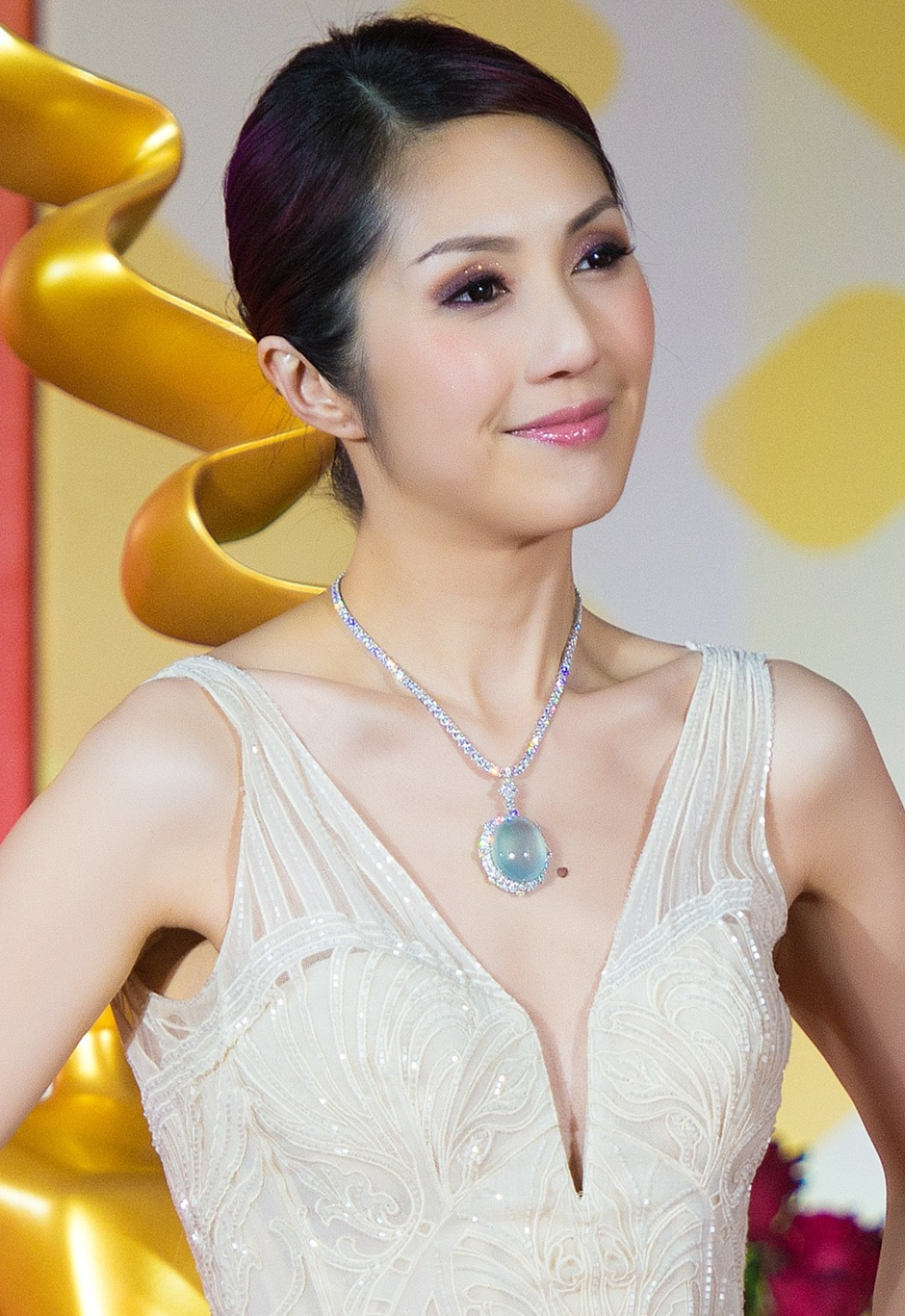
- Yeung in 2014
- Studio albums: 20
- Extended plays: 7
- Live albums: 9
- Compilation albums: 10

The discography of Hong Kong recording artist Miriam Yeung (Chinese: 楊千嬅) consists of twenty studio albums, ten compilation albums, nine live albums and seven extended plays.

== Albums ==
=== Studio albums ===
Title	Album details	Peak chart positions	Certifications
Title	Album details	HK	Certifications
The Wolf Is Coming (狼來了)	Released: 20 November 1996; Language: Cantonese; Label: Capital Artists	—	IFPI HK: Gold
Feeling (直覺)	Released: 13 June 1997; Language: Cantonese; Label: Capital Artists	4	
Visit This Place (到此一遊)	Released: 6 April 1998; Language: Cantonese; Label: Capital Artists	2	
Summer Story (夏天的故事)	Released: 30 July 1999; Language: Cantonese; Label: Capital Artists	1	
Smiling (微笑)	Released: 13 November 1999; Language: Mandarin; Label: Capital Artists	6	
A Winter's Tale (冬天的故事)	Released: 1 December 1999; Language: Cantonese; Label: Capital Artists	4	
Treasure Hunting (尋寶)	Released: January 2000; Language: Mandarin; Label:	—	
Miriam	Released: 22 September 2001; Language: Cantonese; Label: Cinepoly Records	—	
Miriam's Music Box	Released: 22 November 2002; Language: Cantonese; Label: Cinepoly Records	—	
Yang Mei (揚眉)	Released: 18 March 2003; Language: Mandarin; Label: Cinepoly Records	—	
Make Up	Released: 9 July 2003; Language: Mandarin; Label: Cinepoly Records	—	
Electric Girl (電光幻影)	Released: 25 June 2004; Language: Cantonese; Label: Gold Label	—	IFPI HK: Platinum
Single	Released: 22 April 2005; Language: Cantonese; Label: Gold Label	—	
Unlimited	Released: 12 December 2006; Language: Cantonese; Label: Gold Label	—	IFPI HK: Gold
Meridian	Released: 14 August 2007; Language: Cantonese; Label: Amusic	—	
Wonder Miriam	Released: 26 September 2008; Language: Cantonese; Label: Amusic	—	IFPI HK: Platinum
Living Very Happily (原來過得很快樂)	Released: 16 October 2009; Language: Cantonese; Label: Amusic	—	
Ready or Not (楊千嬅)	Released: 8 March 2011; Language: Mandarin; Label: Capital Artists	—	
Fire Bird (火鳥)	Released: 18 January 2012; Language: Cantonese; Label: Capital Artists	4	
If Everybody Had an Ocean (如果大家都擁有海)	Released: 11 December 2015; Language: Cantonese; Label: Media Asia Music	2	
RECOLLECTION, VOL. I - MY Harmonic Minor	Released: 3 November 2025; Language: Cantonese; Label: Right Track Culture Entertainment		

=== Compilation albums ===
Year	Album details
Miriam Experiencing Collection (楊千嬅體驗入學)	Released: 22 August 1998; Language: Cantonese; Label: Capital Artists
My Favourite Hits	Released: 27 September 2001; Language: Cantonese; Label: Capital Artists
Miriam's Melodies	Released: 27 November 2003; Language: Cantonese; Label: Cinepoly Records
Stupid Boy (傻仔 2004 新曲+精選)	Released: 2004; Language: Cantonese; Label: Cinepoly Records
Golden Classics (金經典)	Released: 2006; Language: Cantonese; Label: Cinepoly Records
Simply Me	Released: 2007; Language: Cantonese; Label: Gold Label
Miriam Singing The Best of Gold Label (千嬅新唱金牌金曲)	Released: 2007; Language: Cantonese; Label: Gold Label
Miriam Greatest Hits 1996-2006 (千嬅盛放)	Released: 2009; Language: Cantonese; Label: Cinepoly Records
Miriam Yeung New + Best Selections (囍愛楊千嬅)	Released: 2010; Language: Cantonese; Label: Golden Typhoon
Gold Typhoon 10th Anniversary Series (金牌10年精選系列)	Released: 2012; Language: Cantonese; Label: Golden Typhoon

=== Live albums ===
Title	Album details	Peak chart positions
Title	Album details	HK
Miriam Yeung 903 California Concert (楊千嬅加州紅紅人館903狂熱份子音樂會)	Released: 30 March 2000; Language: Cantonese	4
Miriam Music Is Live (Music is Live Miriam 楊千嬅拉闊音樂會2001)	Released: 24 December 2001; Language: Cantonese	—
Million Purple Thousand Red M Yeung Live (萬紫千紅演唱會)	Released: 29 November 2002; Language: Cantonese	—
Anthony Wong + Miriam Yeung 903 Music is Live (Music is Live 黃耀明X楊千嬅)	Released: 14 January 2003; Language: Cantonese	—
Miriam Yeung New Year Concert Volume 3 (楊千嬅演唱會開年大典 Vol.3)	Released: 6 May 2004; Language: Cantonese	—
Miriam Yeung + Chet Lam Music is Live (楊千嬅 X 林一峰拉闊音樂會)	Released: 4 October 2005; Language: Cantonese	—
Ladies & Gentlemen Miriam Yeung World Tour—Hong Kong Station (Ladies & Gentlemen楊千嬅世界巡迴演唱會香港站)	Released: 22 December 2010; Language: Cantonese	—
Minor Classics	Released: 9 May 2012; Language: Cantonese	—
Let's Begin Concert 2015 (Let's Begin Concert 2015 世界巡迴演唱會)	Released: 26 May 2015; Language: Cantonese	1
Miriam Yeung 3 2 1 Go! Concert Live 2017	Released: 28 March 2018; Language: Cantonese	1

== Extended plays ==
Year	Album details	Sales	Certifications
Diary (私日記)	Released: 11 November 1997; Language: Cantonese; Label:		IFPI HK: Gold
Big Shock (大激想)	Released: 1 August 1998; Language: Cantonese; Label:		
Kiss Me Soft, Play It Loud	Released: 1 September 2000; Language: Cantonese; Label:	HK: 100,000	IFPI HK: 2× Platinum
M VS M Part I	Released: 15 April 2002; Language: Cantonese; Label:	HK: 200,000	IFPI HK: 4× Platinum
M VS M Part II	Released: 1 June 2002; Language: Cantonese; Label:	HK: 200,000	IFPI HK: 4× Platinum
Grand Opening (開大)	Released: 21 January 2004; Language: Cantonese; Label:		
Home	Released: 7 October 2010; Language: Cantonese; Label:		
