= Whatever It Takes (Mary Alessi album) =

Live album by Mary Alessi
- Released: July 8, 2003
- Recorded: Metro Life Worship Center, Miami, Florida
- Genre: Gospel; Inspirational
- Label: Miami Life Sounds
- Producer: Mary Alessi; Steve Alessi

Mary Alessi chronology
Whatever It Takes	More

Whatever It Takes is a gospel album by Mary Alessi.

== Track listing ==
1. "With My Whole Heart" (Mary Alessi) - 03:33
2. "Praise the Lord" (Alessi) - 03:55
3. "Blessed Be The Lord" (Martha Munizzi) - 04:28
4. "All For Me" (Alessi) - 04:06
5. "Lord You've Been Good to Me" (Alessi) - 05:01
6. "Sing for Joy" (Alessi, Deryl Lampkin) - 04:50
7. "Lord I'm Yours" (Clint Brown) - 03:41
8. "You Make All The Difference" (Alessi) - 06:18
9. "Whatever It Takes" (Alessi, Lampkin) - 06:13
10. "Con Mi Corazón" (Alessi) - 03:26
11. "Gloria A Dios" (Alessi) - 03:57
12. "Bendito Es El Señor" (Munizzi) - 04:19

== Personnel ==
- Mary Alessi - Lead Vocals, Keyboards
- Kinetra Only - Background Vocals
- Essie Yera - Background Vocals
- Armando Gomez - Background Vocals
- Tony Izquierdo - Background Vocals
- Martha Munizzi - Lead Vocals on "Blessed Be the Lord"
- Deryl Lampkin - Keyboards
- Kiko Donadel - Guitar
- Rodney Clayton - Bass
- Alton Hudson - Drums
- Orlando Contreras Jr. - Percussions
