= Unlimited =

Unlimited may refer to:

- Infinity, a boundless or limitless extent or quantity

== Arts and entertainment ==
=== Games and comics ===
- Unlimited (Magic: The Gathering), a 1993 core set
- SimCity 3000 Unlimited, a revision of SimCity 3000
- The Unstoppable Wasp: Unlimited, two collected volumes of the comic book series The Unstoppable Wasp
- Test Drive Unlimited
- Test Drive Unlimited 2

=== Music ===
- Unlimited (Bassnectar album), 2016
- Unlimited (F.I.R. album) or the title song, 2005
- Unlimited (Kim Hyun-joong album), 2012
- Unlimited (Miriam Yeung album), 2006
- Unlimited (Reba McEntire album), 1982
- Unlimited (Shizuka Kudo album), 1990
- Unlimited (Shouta Aoi album) or the title song, 2015
- Unlimited (Susperia album), 2004
- Unlimited!, by Roger Troutman, 1987
- Unlimited (EP), by Soul Position, or the title song, 2002
- Unlimited, a recurring leitmotif from the musical Wicked
- The Unlimited, a song by Sufjan Stevens and Lowell Brams from Aporia, 2020

=== Television ===
- Final Fantasy: Unlimited, a 2001–2002 Japanese anime series
- Sasuke Vietnam, a 2015 Vietnamese adaptation of the 1997 Japanese television series Sasuke, also known by Vietnamese title as Không giới hạn - Sasuke Việt Nam (lit. 'Sasuke Vietnam: Unlimited').
- The Millionaire Detective Balance: Unlimited, a 2020 Japanese anime series

== Other uses ==
- Unlimited (arts initiative), a British arts commissioning programme to celebrate the work of disabled and deaf artists
- Unlimited company, a type of corporation in the UK, Ireland, and other countries
- Unlimited Paenga Tawhiti, merged with Discovery 1 to form Ao Tawhiti, a state area school in Christchurch, New Zealand

== See also ==
- Aditi, Sanskrit for "not (a) bound (diti)" or without limits
- Ein Sof, Hebrew for "unending" or without limits
- Adventures Unlimited (disambiguation)
- Limit (disambiguation)
- Limitless (disambiguation)
- Limited (disambiguation)
