= No Limit =

No Limit may refer to:

== Music ==
=== Record labels ===
- No Limit Records, a record label founded by Master P
- No Limit Forever Records, a record label founded by Romeo Miller, son of Master P

=== Albums ===
- No Limit (Art Pepper album), 1977
- No Limit (Mari Iijima album), 1999
- No Limit (EP), by Monsta X, 2021
- No Limit, a 2021 compilation album with Ninho, Orelsan, Heuss l'Enfoiré, Bosh, and others

=== Songs ===
- "No Limit" (2 Unlimited song), 1993
- "No Limit" (G-Eazy song), 2017
- "No Limit" (Usher song), 2016
- "No Limit", a song by Front Line Assembly from their album Gashed Senses & Crossfire
- "No Limit", a song by G Herbo from his mixtape Ballin Like I'm Kobe
- "No Limit", a song by Inna from her album I Am the Club Rocker
- "No Limit", a song by Skeme featuring The Game
- "No Limit", a song by Wiz Khalifa from his album O.N.I.F.C.

=== Fashion ===
- Nolimit, Sri Lankan fashion retail chain

== Film and television ==
- No Limit (1931 film), starring Clara Bow
- No Limit (1935 film), a comedy about the Isle of Man TT Race, starring George Formby and Florence Desmond
- No Limit (2006 film), a documentary about the professional poker tournament circuit
- No Limit (2011 film), a Chinese comedy / action film directed by Fu Huayang
- No Limit (2022 film) (Sous emprise) a French drama / romance film
- Heading to the Ground, also known as No Limit, a 2009 South Korean TV series
- No Limit (TV series), a 2012 French action TV show created by Luc Besson and starring Vincent Elbaz

== Sports and gaming ==
- No Limit (professional wrestling), a professional wrestling tag team
- A discipline of freediving
- A poker betting, term

== See also ==
- No Limits (disambiguation)
