= Broken Bones =

Broken Bones may refer to:

- Bone fracture
- Broken Bones (band), an English hardcore punk band
- Broken Bones (album), an album by Dokken
- The Broken Bones, a 2000 EP by MxPx
- "Broken Bones" (song), by Love Inc.
- "Broken Bones", a song by Birds of Tokyo from Universes (album)
- "Broken Bones", a song by Roger Waters from Is This the Life We Really Want?
- Broken bones plant, Oroxylum indicum, a flowering plant
