= Tim Kelly =

Tim or Timothy Kelly may refer to:

- Tim Kelly (Alaska politician) (1944–2009), Alaska state legislator
- Tim Kelly (Minnesota politician) (born 1964), Minnesota politician and a member of the Minnesota House of Representatives
- Tim Kelly (Michigan politician) (born 1956), member of the Michigan House of Representatives
- Tim Kelly (Tennessee politician) (born 1967), mayor of Chattanooga
- Tim Kelly (footballer) (born 1994), Australian footballer for West Coast
- Tim Kelly (musician) (1963–1998), American guitarist for the band Slaughter
- Tim Kelly (playwright) (1937–1998), American playwright
- Tim David Kelly, American musician, songwriter and record producer
- Tim T. Kelly, American media executive, film producer, and conservationist
- Tim Kelly (American football) (born 1986), American football coach
- Timothy Kelly (sports executive), American lacrosse executive
- Timothy J. Kelly (born 1969), United States District Judge

== See also ==
- Tim O'Kelly (1941–1990), American actor
- Tim Kelley (born 1986), American alpine ski racer
