= When Women Worship =

Live album by Mary Alessi
- Released: January 2, 2007
- Recorded: August 30, 2006; Covenant Church; Dallas, Texas
- Genre: Gospel; Inspirational
- Label: Miami Life Sounds
- Producer: J. Stephen Alessi; Aaron W. Lindsey

Mary Alessi chronology
| More | When Women Worship |

When Women Worship is a gospel album by Mary Alessi which was recorded on August 30, 2006 at the Covenant Church in Dallas, Texas and released on January 2, 2007.

== Track listing ==
1. "There Is A River" (David Sapp, Max Sapp) - 02:02
2. "Thirst For You" (John Ragsdale, Jr) - 03:47
3. "As The Deer" (Martin Nystrom) - 02:01
4. "More" (Mary Alessi, Martha Munizzi) - 02:52
5. "The King Is Enthralled With Your Beauty" Featuring Amie Dockery - 04:07
6. "Always Welcome" (Alessi, Cindy Cruse-Ratliff) - 04:30
7. "Come Boldly" (David Binion, Mark Lowry) - 03:22
8. "The Prayer" - 02:47
9. "When I Find Him" (Jessi Rogers Goodman, Jason Rogers) - 03:53
10. "I Open My Heart" (Binion, Tanya Godman Sykes, Michael Sykes) - 03:20
11. "I Surrender All (All To Him I Owe)" (Alessi, Aaron W. Lindsey) - 04:17
12. "I Surrender All (Yo Me Rindo A El)" (Judson Wheeler Van De Venter, Winfield S. Weeden) - 02:04
13. "Decorating Nations (Conceiving The Impossible)" - 11:16
14. "Overshadow Me" (Binion, Alessi, Amie Dockery, Lindsey) - 04:51
15. "Overshadowed Overtre (The Enter-lude)" (Lindsey) - 01:13
16. "Great Grace" (Lindsey, Alessi) - 05:09
17. "Great Grace (Reprise)" - 06:19
18. "You Are God" (Kurt Carr) - 02:05
19. "Agnus Dei" (Michael W. Smith) - 05:00

== Personnel ==
- Mary Alessi - Vocals
- Nicole Binion - Vocals
- Ingrid Rosario - Vocals
- Amie Dockery - Vocals
- Da'Dra Crawford Greathouse - Vocals
- Cindy Cruse Ratcliff - Vocals
- Martha Munizzi - Vocals
- Aaron W. Lindsey - Piano and Keys
- Clay Bogan III - Aux Keys and Synths
- Charles "Chuck" Bethany - Organ
- Braylin Lacey - Bass
- Aaron DeLos Santos - Acoustic & Electric Guitars
- Chris Coleman - Drums
- Tuwana Kemp - Background Vocals
- Nicole Miller-Crenshaw - Studio Background Vocals
- Anitha Abraham - Background Vocals
- Andria Sirka - Background Vocals
- Joyce Halbert - Studio Background Vocals
- Christina (George) Williams - Background Vocals
- Lacy Edley - Background Vocals
- Keisha Bethany - Background Vocals
- The Women of the Covenant Church Choir-Background Vocals

== Certification and Chart Success ==
When Women Worship peaked at #13 on Billboard magazine's Top Gospel Albums, #37 on the Top Christian Albums chart, and #34 on the Top Heatseekers album charts.
