= Limit =

Limit or Limits may refer to:

== Mathematics ==
- Limit (mathematics), the value that a function or sequence "approaches" as the input or index approaches some value
  - Limit of a function, including the formal definition of the mathematical notion of limit
  - Limit of a sequence
  - One-sided limit, either of the two limits of a function as a specified point is approached from below or from above
- Limit inferior and limit superior
- Limit of a net
- Limit point, in topological spaces
- Limit (category theory)
  - Direct limit
  - Inverse limit

== Media and arts ==
- Limit (manga), a manga by Keiko Suenobu
- Limit (film), a South Korean film
- The Limit (1972 film), an independent American film
- Gone Dark, also known as The Limit, a 2003 Canadian-British crime drama mystery film
- Limits (collection), a collection of short stories and essays by Larry Niven
- "The Limit", an episode from Adventure Time
- "The Limit", an episode from The Amazing World of Gumball
- "The Limit" (The Two of Us), a 1986 television episode

=== Music ===
- Limit (music), a way to characterize harmony
- "Limit" (song), a 2016 single by Luna Sea
- "Limits", a 2009 song by Calvin Harris from Ready for the Weekend
- "Limits", a 2019 song by Paenda; see Austria in the Eurovision Song Contest 2019
- The Limit (group), a Dutch musical group

== Other uses ==
- Limits (BDSM), activities that a partner feels strongly about, and to which special attention is paid
- limits.h, the header of a general purpose standard library of the C programming language
- Els Límits, a village in La Jonquera, Catalonia, Spain
- Limit order, a type of exchange order
- Speed limit, on road traffic
- Setting limits, a life skill for protecting against having personal values compromised or violated
- Limit, a philosophy concept by Eugenio Trías

== See also ==
- The Limit Is Just Me, a documentary film about the world's longest triathlon
- Limited (disambiguation)
- Limitation (disambiguation)
- Limitless (disambiguation)
- Unlimited (disambiguation)
- No Limits (disambiguation)
