= Boyce Avenue =

American cover band

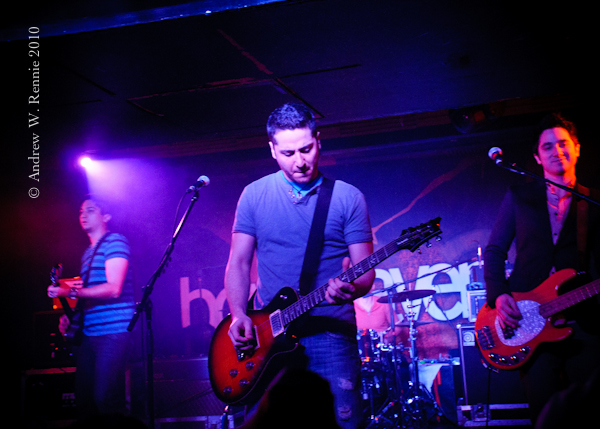
- Boyce Avenue performing in 2010

Background information
- Origin: Sarasota, Florida, US
- Genres: Pop rock, alternative rock
- Years active: 2004–present
- Labels: 3 Peace; Universal Republic
- Members: Alejandro Luis Manzano; Fabian Rafael Manzano; Daniel Enrique Manzano
- Website: www.boyceavenue.com

YouTube information
- Channel: Boyce Avenue
- Genre: Music
- Subscribers: 16.8 milion
- Views: 6.95 billion
- Last updated: April 12, 2025

Boyce Avenue is an American rock band formed in Sarasota, Florida by brothers Alejandro, Daniel, and Fabian Manzano. Boyce Avenue releases both original music and covers of contemporary and classic songs.

The band rose to prominence by covering popular songs and uploading videos of their performances to YouTube. Originally signed to Universal Republic Records, the band left the label in 2010 and started their own independent record label called, 3 Peace Records.

== Career ==
=== 2004–2009: Formation and debut album ===
Boyce Avenue formed in October 2004 when Daniel moved back to Florida after graduating from Harvard Law School. Alejandro and Fabian were both attending classes at the University of Florida but left before graduating. The three attended Pine View School together before college. The brothers wrote music and performed at local shows in Florida.

In 2007, Boyce Avenue began posting videos of original music and covers of popular songs on YouTube. Some of the first videos they posted included acoustic versions of Justin Timberlake's "LoveStoned", Rihanna's "Umbrella", and Coldplay's "Viva la Vida". While producing the videos for YouTube, Boyce Avenue continued to create original material for their album, All You're Meant to Be, which was released on March 3, 2008.

On October 2, 2009 WWE featured their single "Hear Me Now" in a video tribute to Eddie Guerrero on their decade of SmackDown show.

=== 2010: Stint with Universal Republic ===
On January 23, 2010, the band signed with Universal Republic and had an original, debut album, entitled All We Have Left, released on June 15, 2010. The album was produced and financed entirely by Boyce Avenue prior to being signed to Universal Republic, eventually being released through their own label, 3 Peace Records. The album contains reworked songs from All You're Meant to Be and new songs written for the album. The lead singles from the album were "Every Breath", "On My Way", and "Broken Angel". The music video for "Every Breath", the first single from the album, was directed by Zach Merch (Blue October, Safetysuit) in Los Angeles, and was a collaborative effort that grew from a treatment written by the band. All We Have Left was written and produced by the band.

=== 2011–present: 3 Peace Records ===
As of August 9, 2011, Boyce Avenue is no longer signed with Universal Republic and produces its CDs through its own label, 3 Peace Records. The label has since signed artist Hannah Trigwell. In November 2011, they released their original music video, "Dare to Believe". In December 2011 they received one million subscribers on YouTube and thanked the subscribers by posting the official music video of "Find Me", from their album All We Have Left. On April 16, 2012, Boyce Avenue released the official video for their song "Broken Angel" as a worldwide debut through Q Magazine and YouTube.

In 2012, Boyce Avenue worked on the American version of The X Factor as vocal coaches.

On August 6, 2013, they released their first live album, from their world tour, called Live in Los Angeles.

The band's EP, No Limits, was released April 22, 2014, with a full-length album originally planned for later in the year. The EP contains more upbeat pop tracks than their previous work.

In 2015, Boyce Avenue partnered with Vessel, a subscription video service, releasing early access content to the platform.

In 2017, the band's YouTube channel reached 10 million subscribers.

== Touring ==
Boyce Avenue's first headline tour was in 2009. In January 2009, the band performed a stand-alone sold-out show in New York City at the Mercury Lounge. With their sights set on connecting with their online fan base, the band turned their attention to touring, playing four headlining shows in the Philippines, performing for an estimated total of 25,000 fans. Following this, the band launched headline tours in the US, Canada, and Europe.

In early 2010, they returned to the Philippines to play festivals with Kris Allen and the Jabbawockeez. This was followed by a spring revisit tour of Europe in 2010. By May 2012, Boyce Avenue had headlined six tours in Great Britain and Ireland, six tours in continental Europe, four tours in the US, three tours in Canada, one tour in Australia, and had played several shows in Southeast Asia. In August 2010, Boyce Avenue performed with the Goo Goo Dolls and Switchfoot. In November 2011, the band sold out almost every single show on its European tour, including sold-out shows at Shepherd's Bush Empire in London, the Olympia Theatre in Dublin (the band's second time selling out that venue in its career), and the Live Music Hall in Cologne, Germany. The band's past opening acts have included Ryan Cabrera, Secondhand Serenade, Tyler Hilton, and several YouTube friends of the band's. During this tour, the Band opened the European MTV Video Awards show by appearing in front of over 20,000 fans in a square in Belfast, Northern Ireland where their performance was very well received.

In 2011, Boyce Avenue toured in Indonesia, Australia, the US, Canada, and Europe. They played in venues such as The Fillmore in San Francisco, Webster Hall in New York, the Riviera Theatre in Chicago, The Sound Academy in Toronto, Shepherd's Bush in London, The Olympia Theatre in Dublin, and Live Music Hall in Cologne.

In January 2012, Boyce Avenue opened for One Direction during their debut "Up All Night Tour" in Great Britain and Ireland.

Beginning in June 2012, Boyce Avenue performed in a headlining tour, which included stops at the Hammersmith Apollo in London, the Waterfront in Belfast, the Turbinenhalle Oberhausen, Stadtpark in Hamburg, several O2 Academy main halls throughout Great Britain (these include Leeds, Manchester and Newcastle among others), and two shows at the Olympia Theatre in Dublin. Also during June, the band also played at the Isle of Wight Festival in Great Britain, Parkpop Festival in the Netherlands, and the Rock am Ring and Rock im Park festivals in Germany.

On May 14, 2013, Boyce Avenue announced a World Tour in the fall. The first four countries they visited were Canada, the US, the UK and Ireland.

In March 2014, they performed for the first time in Spain, with both concerts in Madrid and Barcelona selling out.

In February 2023, Boyce Avenue performed at the Araneta Coliseum in the Philippines.

Boyce Avenue's 2025 tour includes dates in Asia and Europe. They will be touring in Kuala Lumpur, Bangkok, Battaramulla, and Jakarta in April, and then have a series of concerts in Belfast, Dublin, Glasgow, Manchester, London, Bristol, Oxford, Amsterdam, Köln, and Hamburg in May, according to their official website.

Boyce Avenue’s 2026 tour includes the United States. Starting March 19 in Dallas, TX and ends March 27 in Roseville, CA, according to their office website.

== Members ==
- Alejandro Manzano – lead vocals, rhythm guitar, piano (since 2004)
- Fabian Manzano – lead guitar, backing vocals (since 2004)
- Daniel Manzano – bass, percussion, backing vocals (since 2004)

Former additional members

- Stephen Hatker - drums, percussion (2004-2010)
- Jason Burrows – drums, percussion (2010-2017)

== Discography ==
=== Studio albums ===
List of studio albums, with selected chart positions
Title	Album details	Peak chart positions
Title	Album details	US Heat
All You’re Meant to Be	Released: March 10, 2009; Label: N/A, independent; Formats: CD, digital download	—
All We Have Left	Released: June 15, 2010; Label: Universal, 3 Peace; Formats: CD, digital download	7
Road Less Traveled	Released: April 15, 2016; Label: 3 Peace; Formats: CD, digital download	15
"—" denotes releases that did not chart or were not released in that territory.

=== Cover albums ===
- Cover Sessions, Vol. 1 (2009)
- Cover Sessions, Vol. 2 (2012)
- Cover Sessions, Vol. 3 (2015)
- Cover Sessions, Vol. 4 (2017)
- Cover Sessions, Vol. 5 (2020)
- Cover Sessions, Vol. 6 (2020)

=== Live albums ===
- Live in Los Angeles (2013)
- Live at the Royal Albert Hall (2018)

=== EPs ===
List of extended plays, with selected chart positions
Title	Album details	Peak chart positions
Title	Album details	US Heat
No Limits	Released: April 22, 2014; Label: 3 Peace; Formats: CD, digital download	14
"—" denotes releases that did not chart or were not released in that territory.

=== Promotional singles ===
List of promotional singles, with release year and affiliated album
Title	Year	Album
"Every Breath"	2011	All We Have Left
"Hear Me Now"	2011	All We Have Left

== Awards and nominations ==
Year	Nominated	Award	Result
2014	Boyce Avenue	Teen Choice for Choice Web Star: Music	Nominated
2016	Boyce Avenue	Teen Choice for Choice Web Star: Music	Nominated
2016	Boyce Avenue	Unsigned Music Awards: UMA Icons Award	Won
