= UMA Entertainment Group =

British entertainment company

- Formation: 2021
- Founder: Simon O'Kelly; Ben Connor; Jamie Hole; Ross Patel
- Founded at: London, UK
- Type: Entertainment Company
- Location: London, UK
- Website: https://umaentertainment.com

UMA Entertainment Group is an entertainment company dedicated to progressing social good and environmental sustainability through the power of music, live events, broadcast and technology. Its chairman is legendary promoter Harvey Goldsmith CBE, who was responsible for the two largest concerts in history, Live Aid and Live 8.

== History ==
In 2015, UMA Music Group was founded to establish a mainstream infrastructure and artist environment designed to look after the interests of self-signed, unsigned and otherwise independent artists. Its debut event was the Unsigned Music Awards, a major televised awards ceremony hosted in the UK by Laura Whitmore and BBC Radios 1's Chris Stark. It relaunched as UMA Entertainment Group in 2021.
