= Scandjet =

IATA	ICAO	Call sign
-	-	—
- Founded: 2002
- Ceased operations: 2016
- Hubs: Göteborg Landvetter Airport
- Alliance: none
- Headquarters: Gothenburg, Sweden
- Website: http://www.scandjet.se

ScandJet was a Swedish travel agency that sells tickets to Croatia and Bosnia and Herzegovina. During the season of April–October ScandJet offers direct flights from Scandinavia (Stockholm Arlanda, Stockholm Västerås, Gothenburg Landvetter, Malmö, Örebro, Umeå, Luleå, Sundsvall, Kalmar, Karlstad, Oslo and Copenhagen) to Croatia (Pula, Zadar, Rijeka, Split, Dubrovnik and Zagreb) and Bosnia & Herzegovina (Mostar).

In 2015, ScandJet launched Limitless Airways, a passenger airline based in Croatia which offered flights between Rijeka and Scandinavian cities. Both Scandjet and Limitless Airways closed in 2016.
