= Alone Again and Other Hits =

Compilation album by Dokken
- Released: October 10, 2003
- Genre: Heavy metal, glam metal
- Length: 43:52
- Label: Elektra / Rhino

Dokken chronology
| Japan Live '95 (2003) | Alone Again and Other Hits (2003) | Hell to Pay (2004) |

Professional ratings
Review scores
| Source | Rating |
|---|---|
| AllMusic | 3.5/5 stars |

Alone Again and Other Hits is a compilation album released by the 1980s heavy metal band Dokken.

== Track listing ==
1. "Alone Again" (Don Dokken, Jeff Pilson) - 4:21
2. "Dream Warriors" (George Lynch, Pilson) - 4:47
3. "In My Dreams" (Pilson, Lynch, Dokken, Mick Brown) - 4:19
4. "Just Got Lucky" (Lynch, Pilson) - 4:36
5. "Stop Fighting Love" (Pilson, Lynch, Dokken, Brown) - 4:52
6. "Heaven Sent" (Dokken, Lynch, Pilson) - 4:53
7. "The Hunter" (Pilson, Lynch, Dokken, Brown) - 4:08
8. "Slippin' Away" (Pilson, Lynch, Dokken, Brown) - 3:48
9. "Jaded Heart" (Pilson, Lynch, Dokken, Brown) - 4:18
10. "Breaking the Chains" (Dokken, Lynch) - 3:50

== Personnel ==
- Don Dokken - lead vocals, additional guitars
- George Lynch - lead and rhythm guitars
- Jeff Pilson - bass, backing vocals
- "Wild" Mick Brown - drums, backing vocals
- Peter Baltes - bass on "Breaking the Chains"
