= All We Have Left =

Studio album by Boyce Avenue
- Released: June 15, 2010
- Recorded: 2009–2010
- Genre: Pop rock, alternative rock
- Length: 54:54
- Label: 3 Peace Records, Universal Republic
- Producer: Boyce Avenue

Boyce Avenue chronology
All You’re Meant to Be (2009)	All We Have Left (2010)	No Limits (2014)

Singles from All We Have Left
- 1. "Every Breath" Released: March 16, 2010

All We Have Left is the second studio album and first major album by American rock band Boyce Avenue, released on June 15, 2010. The album's first single "Every Breath" was released digitally on March 16, 2010. The album reached No. 7 on Billboard Top Heatseekers chart in July 2010.

== Background ==
As of the end of 2009, the band had finished recording a full album of original music, had produced and financed the entire project on its own, and had developed a plan to release the album independently through its own label, 3 Peace Records. At that time, they were approached by Universal Republic to partner in the release of the album. The band, impressed with Republic's excitement about the music and the band's wanting to remain hands on with their music, videos, and websites, signed with Universal Republic in November 2009. The band's major label debut album, "All We Have Left", was released on June 15, 2010, featuring "Every Breath", the first single from the album. The music video for the song was shot by director Zach Merck (Blue October, Safetysuit) in Los Angeles, and was a collaborative effort that grew from a treatment written by the band.

Singer/guitarist Alejandro Manzano comments, "It's been a long-time goal of ours to release a full-length debut album worldwide, with all of our music on it the way we've always wanted the world to hear it. We feel this album is the kind of release our fans deserve to hear."

On June 18, 2013, an all instrumental version of the album was released. The track listing on the instrumental version is the same as below.

== Track listing ==
All tracks are written by Alejandro Manzano, except where noted.

No.	Title	Length
1.	"Daylight (instrumental)" (Alejandro, Daniel and Fabian Manzano)	2:08
2.	"More Things to Say"	4:01
3.	"Broken Angel"	5:21
4.	"Every Breath" (Daniel Manzano)	4:14
5.	"Find Me"	4:37
6.	"When the Lights Die" (Fabian Manzano)	4:24
7.	"Change Your Mind"	3:37
8.	"Not Enough" (Fabian Manzano)	4:02
9.	"Hear Me Now"	4:04
10.	"Dare to Believe"	4:50
11.	"Briane" (Alejandro and Daniel Manzano)	5:18
12.	"On My Way"	3:52
13.	"Tonight" (lyrics: Daniel Manzano; music: Alejandro and Daniel Manzano)	4:27

== Personnel ==
- Alejandro Manzano – vocals, guitar, piano
- Fabian Manzano - guitar, backing vocals
- Daniel Manzano - bass, backing vocals, percussion

Additional musicians

- Mark Mercado – drums (tracks 1, 3, 7)
- Christian Paschall – drums (tracks 8, 9, 13)
- Matt Brown – drums (tracks 2, 5)
- Stephen Hatker – drums (tracks 4, 6, 11, 12)
