= Say the Name =

Live album by Martha Munizzi
- Released: July 16, 2002
- Genre: Gospel music
- Length: 63:30
- Label: Integrity Music

Martha Munizzi chronology
Say the Name (2002)	The Best Is Yet to Come (2003)

Say the Name is an American gospel album released on July 16, 2002 by Martha Munizzi on the Integrity Music label.

== Track listing ==
1. "Rejoice" – 05:22
2. "Shout" – 05:35
3. "It's Time To Dance" – 04:38
4. "God Has A Way" – 04:37
5. "Say The Name" - 10:01
6. "Blessed Be The Lord" – 06:05
7. "Because Of Who You Are" - 08:38
8. "Holy Spirit Fill This Room" – 05:59
9. "Filled With Praise" – 05:40
10. "At All Times" – 06:55

== Awards ==
Say the Name was nominated for a Grammy Award in 2006 in the Best Traditional Soul Gospel Album category. The title song was nominated for a 2005 Dove Award in the Contemporary Gospel Song of the Year category.

=== Award Nominations ===
Year	Award-giving body	Award category	Song /Album Title
2005	Dove Awards	Contemporary Gospel Song of the Year	Say the Name
2006	Grammy Award	Best Traditional Soul Gospel Album	Say the Name
