= Limited Edition =

Limited Edition(s) may refer to:

- Limited edition or special edition, an item or collection produced in limited numbers or for a limited time
- Limited Edition (Magic: The Gathering), the first Magic: The Gathering card set, 1993
- "Limited Edition" (song) by Sevi, 2011
- "Limited Edition", a song by Nina Nesbitt from Älskar, 2022
- Limited Edition Sportswear, an Australian clothing company

== Albums ==
- Limited Edition (Can album), 1974; expanded as Unlimited Edition, 1976
- Limited Edition (Lewis Taylor album), 2002
- Limited Edition (Roger McGuinn album), 2004
- Limited Edition (Yolandita Monge album), 1991
- Limited Edition 2004, by Lewis Taylor, 2004
- Limited Editions 1990–94, by Alec Empire, 1994
- Limited-Edition Vinyl Box Set, by Metallica, 2004

== EPs ==
- Limited Edition (Benjy Davis Project EP), 2007
- Limited Edition (The Concretes EP), comprised in Boyoubetterunow, 2000
- Limited Edition (Pocket Dwellers EP), 1998
- Limited Edition EP, by Psychopathic Rydas, 2004
- Limited Edition Live 12-6-2000, by Out of the Grey, 2001
- Limited Edition Tour EP, by Caedmon's Call, 1997
