= Limitation =

Limitation may refer to:

- Limitation Act, a list of legislation in Malaysia and the United Kingdom
- A statute of limitations
- Limitations (novel), a 2006 novel by Scott Turow
- A disclaimer for research done in an experiment or study

== See also ==
- Limit (disambiguation)
