= Living Very Happily =

Studio album 原來過得很快樂 by Miriam Yeung
- Released: 16 October 2009 (Worldwide)
- Genre: Cantopop
- Language: Cantonese
- Label: Amusic

Miriam Yeung chronology
Wonder Miriam (2008)	Living Very Happily (2009)	Miriam Greatest Hits (2009)

Living Very Happily (Chinese: 原來過得很快樂) is Cantopop artist Miriam Yeung's (Chinese: 楊千嬅) fourteenth Cantonese studio album. It was released by Amusic on 16 October 2009.

The album includes eleven new songs. The second edition of the album came out on 2 December 2009. The second album includes a DVD with three music videos.

== Track listing ==
1. 真命天子 (The Man of Destiny)
2. 我在橋上看風景 (Standing on a Bridge Looking at the Scenery)
3. 原來過得很快樂 (Living Very Happily)
4. 你幸福嗎 (Are You Happy?)
5. All About Love
6. 麥芽糖 (Maltose)
7. 藍風箏 (Blue Kite)
8. 對木偶唱歌 (Singing to the Puppet)
9. 孖公仔 (Twins)
10. 圓缺 (Complete and Incomplete)
11. All About Love (Little Orchestra Mix)

== DVD ==
1. 真命天子 (The Man of Destiny) MV
2. 我在橋上看風景 (Standing on a Bridge Looking at the Scenery) MV
3. 原來過得很快樂 (Living Very Happily) MV

== Awards and Recognitions ==
Song	Award	Ref
原來過得很快樂 (Living Very Happily)	Ultimate Song Chart Awards – Ultimate Top 10 Songs	
原來過得很快樂 (Living Very Happily)	Metro Showbiz Hit Awards – Hit Song	
原來過得很快樂 (Living Very Happily)	RTHK Top 10 Gold Songs Awards Ceremony – Top 10 Songs	
真命天子 (Man of Destiny)	Jade Solid Gold Top 10 Awards – Top 10 Songs	
