= Miriam Yeung New and Best Selections =

Compilation album 囍愛 新曲+精選 by Miriam Yeung
- Released: 5 October 2010 (Worldwide)
- Genre: Cantopop
- Language: Cantonese
- Label: Gold Typhoon

Miriam Yeung chronology
Miriam Greatest Hits (2009)	Miriam Yeung New and Best Selections (2010)	Home (2010)

Miriam Yeung New and Best Selections (Chinese: 囍愛 新曲+精選) is Cantopop artist Miriam Yeung's (Chinese: 楊千嬅) eighth Compilation album. It was released by her former label, Gold Label Records, on 5 October 2010.

The package includes 2 CDs that includes twenty-four Miriam's greatest hits during her time under Gold Label (2004–2006) and 4 previously unreleased songs. The package also include a Karaoke DVD.

== Track listing ==
Bold are new songs.

=== CD1 ===
1. 偷生 (Live With No Dignity)
2. 童話 (Fairytale)
3. 烈女 (Fierce Lady)
4. 滾 – 梁漢文+楊千嬅 (Get Off)
5. 煉金術 (Alchemy)
6. 長信不如短訊 (Short Message Is Better Than Long Letter)
7. 情歌 (Love Song)
8. 我的醉愛 (Love Drunk)
9. 花與愛麗斯 (Hana and Alice)
10. 水月鏡花 (Gorgeous Sight)
11. 郎來了(Wolf Is Coming)
12. 真愛開玩笑 (True Love Makes Fun)
13. 大城大事 (Small City Big Matter – Music performed by Twelve Girls Band)
14. 小星星 (Little Stars)

=== CD2 ===
1. 小城大事 (Small City Big Matter)
2. 你把我灌醉 (You Get Me Drunk)
3. 處處吻 (Kissing Everywhere)
4. 大傻 (Naive)
5. 我的生存之道 (The Way I Live My Life)
6. 花灑 (Shower)
7. 流星雨 (Meteor Rain)
8. 簡愛 (Simple Love)
9. 柳媚花嬌 (Flowery)
10. 芬梨道上 (On Findlay Road)
11. 長恨哥哥 (Hate You, Brother)
12. 超齡 (Over-age)
13. 自由行 (Individual Visit)
14. 你是如此難以忘記 (Hard To Forget You)

== Music videos ==
1. 小城大事(Small City Big Matter)
2. 烈女 (Fierce Lady)
3. 大傻 (Naive)
4. 滾 (Get Off)
5. 處處吻 (Kissing Everywhere)
6. 長信不如短訊 (Short Message Is Better Than Long Letter)
7. 簡愛 (Simple Love)
8. 郎來了 (Wolf Is Coming)
9. 我的生存之道 (The Way I Live My Life)
10. 長恨哥哥 (Hate You, Brother)
