= The Definitive Rock Collection (Dokken album) =

Dokken: The Definitive Rock Collection

Greatest hits album by Dokken
- Released: 2006
- Recorded: 1983–1995, 2002, 2004
- Genre: Heavy metal
- Length: 135:40
- Label: Rhino / Elektra
- Producer: Various

Dokken chronology
Change the World: An Introduction (2004)	Dokken: The Definitive Rock Collection (2006)	From Conception: Live 1981 (2007)

Professional ratings
Review scores
Source	Rating
AllMusic	4.5/5 stars

Dokken: The Definitive Rock Collection a 2-disc compilation album by the American heavy metal band Dokken, released in 2006 by Rhino Records.

== Track listing ==
=== Disc 1 ===
1. "Breaking the Chains" - 3:51
2. "Felony" - 3:09
3. "Live to Rock (Rock to Live)" - 3:36
4. "Nightrider" - 3:14
5. "Paris Is Burning" (live) - 5:08
6. "Tooth and Nail" - 3:41
7. "Just Got Lucky" - 4:35
8. "Don't Close Your Eyes" - 4:11
9. "Into the Fire" - 4:27
10. "Alone Again" - 4:22
11. "Turn On the Action" - 4:46
12. "Unchain the Night" - 5:20
13. "The Hunter" - 4:08
14. "In My Dreams" - 4:20
15. "Lightnin' Strikes Again" - 3:48
16. "It's Not Love" - 4:59
17. "Till the Livin' End" - 4:02

=== Disc 2 ===
1. "Prisoner" - 4:21
2. "Heaven Sent" - 4:53
3. "Mr. Scary" - 4:31
4. "So Many Tears" - 4:57
5. "Burning Like a Flame" - 4:44
6. "Dream Warriors" - 4:46
7. "Walk Away" - 5:01
8. "Kiss of Death" (live) - 5:30
9. "When Heaven Comes Down" (live) - 3:56
10. "Standing in the Shadows" (live) - 4:37
11. "Too High to Fly" - 7:12
12. "Long Way Home" - 5:13
13. "Escape" - 4:37

== Personnel ==
=== Dokken ===
- Don Dokken - lead vocals, guitar
- George Lynch - guitar, background vocals
- Juan Croucier - bass guitar, background vocals
- Mick Brown - drums, background vocals
- Jeff Pilson - bass guitar, background vocals
- Jon Levin - guitar, background vocals
- Barry Sparks - bass guitar
