= Miriam Greatest Hits =

Compilation album 千嬅盛放 by Miriam Yeung
- Released: 4 December 2009 (Worldwide)
- Genre: Cantopop
- Language: Cantonese
- Label: Go East

Miriam Yeung chronology
Living Very Happily (2009)	Miriam Greatest Hits (2009)	Miriam Yeung New and Best Selections (2010)

Miriam Greatest Hits (Chinese: 千嬅盛放) is Cantopop artist Miriam Yeung's (Chinese: 楊千嬅) seventh Compilation album. It was released by Go East on 4 December 2009.

The package includes 3 CDs that includes forty-one Miriam's greatest hits from 1996 to 2006. The package also include a DVD with twelve music videos.

== Track listing ==
=== CD1 ===
1. 狼來了 (Wolf Is Coming)
2. 再見二丁目 (Goodbye Nichō)
3. 直覺 (Instinct)
4. 友誼萬歲 (Friendship Forever)
5. 手信 (Souvenir)
6. 數你 (Counting You)
7. 大激想 (Wild Dream)
8. 因為所以（畢氏定理） (Because & Therefore – Pythagorean Theorem)
9. 愛人 (Lover)
10. 抬起我的頭來 (Raise My Head)
11. 夏天的故事 (Summer Story)
12. 冰點 (Freezing Point)
13. 木偶奇遇記 (The Adventures of Pinocchio)
14. 最後的歌 (Last Song)
15. 少女的祈禱 (Maiden's Prayer)
16. 如果東京不快樂 (If Tokyo is Not Happy)
17. 可人兒 (Cutie)

=== CD2 ===
1. 姊妹 (Sister)
2. 野孩子 (Wild Child)
3. 悲歌之王 (King of Sad Songs)
4. 假如讓我說下去 (If You Let Me Continue)
5. 河童 (River Creature)
6. 楊千嬅 (Yeung Chin Wah – Remix)
7. 閃靈 (The Shining)
8. 勇 (Courage)
9. 向左走向右走 (Turn Left, Turn Right)
10. 小飛俠 (Peter Pan)
11. 可惜我是水瓶座 (Sadly I am an Aquarius)
12. 笑中有淚 (Hidden Tear in Smiles)
13. 我是羊 (I am a Sheep)
14. 飛女正傳 (Story of a Bad Girl)
15. 稀客 (Rare Visitor)
16. 咬唇 (Biting Lips)
17. 寒舍 (Cold Accommodation)

=== CD3 ===
1. 小星星 (Little Stars)
2. 自由行 (Individual Visit)
3. 小城大事 (Small City Big Matter)
4. 處處吻 (Kissing Everywhere)
5. 煉金術 (Alchemy)
6. 烈女 (Fierce Lady)
7. 簡愛 (Simple Love)
8. 長信不如短訊(長痛不如短痛) (Short Message Is Better Than Long Letter – Immediate Relief Mix)
9. 花與愛麗斯 (Hana and Alice)
10. 超齡 (Over-age)
11. 火紅火熱–楊千嬅/ 梁漢文/ 鄭中基/ 何韻詩 (Red & Hot Fire)
12. 我的醉愛 (Love Drunk)
13. 大傻 (Naive)
14. 我的生存之道 (The Way I Live My Life)
15. 芬梨道上 (On Findlay Road)
16. 郎來了(ROSE) (Groom Is Coming – ROSE)
17. 滾 – 楊千嬅/梁漢文 (Get Off)

== DVD ==
1. 再見二丁目 (Goodbye Nichō)
2. 愛人 (Lover)
3. 抬起我的頭來 (Raise My Head)
4. 如果東京不快樂 (If Tokyo Is Not Happy)
5. 姊妹 (Sister)
6. 野孩子 (Wild Child)
7. 閃靈 (The Shining)
8. 可惜我是水瓶座 (Sadly I am an Aquarius)
9. 煉金術 (Alchemy)
10. 小城大事 (Small City Big Matter)
11. 郎來了 (Wolf Is Coming)
12. 長信不如短訊 (Short Message Is Better Than Long Letters)
