= Unsigned Music Awards =

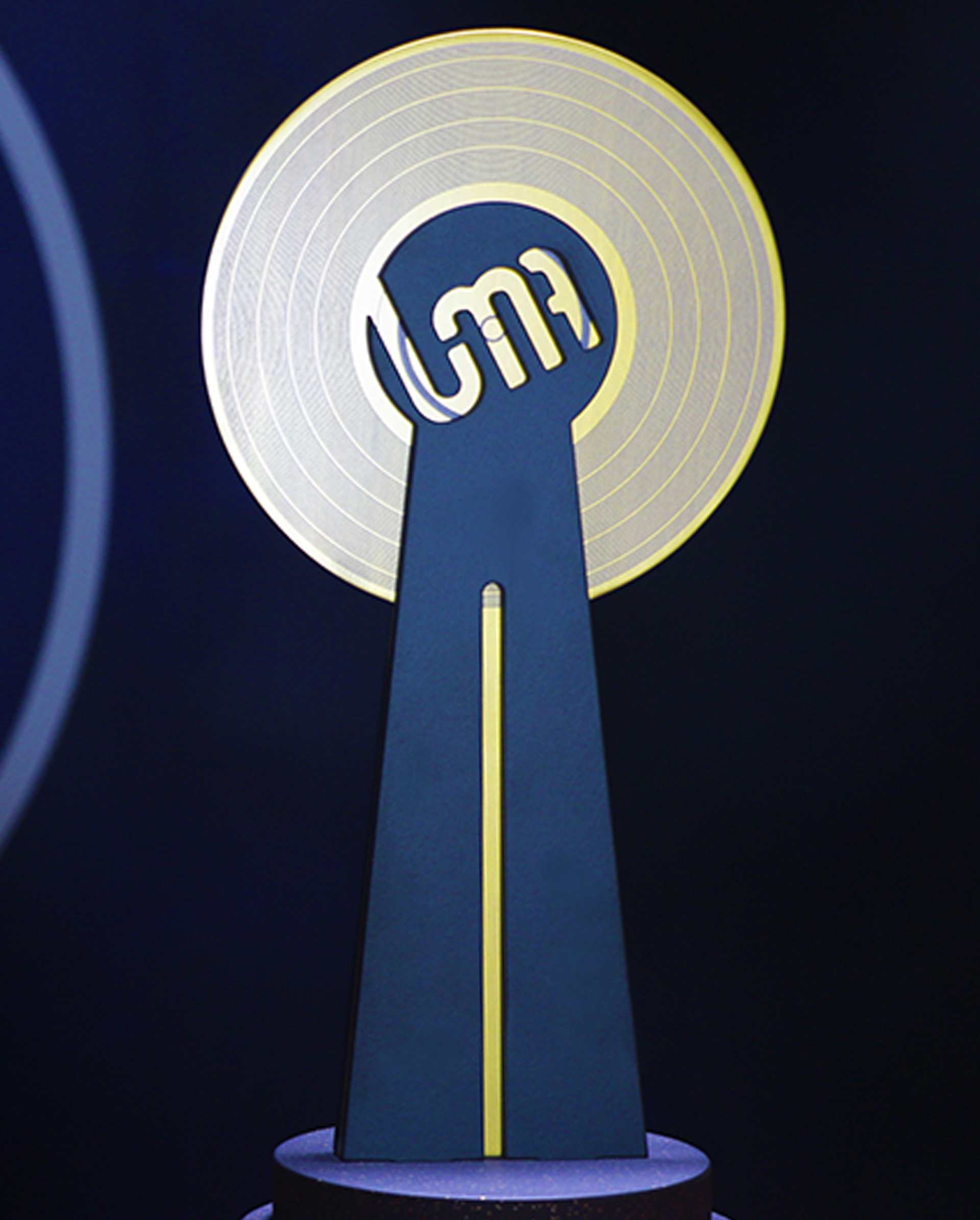
- The official trophy for the Unsigned Music Awards.
- Sponsored by: Liquiproof
- Date: 16 May 2018
- Location: The Brighton Centre
- Country: UK
- Presented by: UMA Music Group
- Hosted by: Laura Whitmore & Chris Stark
- First award: 2016

Highlights
- Icons Award: Boyce Avenue
- Best Album: Rothwell
- Best Female: Elle Exxe
- Best Male: Mullally
- Website: umamusic.com

Television/radio coverage
- Network: Sky, Freeview, Freesat, UNILAD
- Runtime: 120 Minutes (Live); 90 Minutes (TV)

The Unsigned Music Awards (often referred to as "UMA" or "The UMAs") is an international televised awards ceremony held annually to recognise the achievements of artists that are not signed to a record label. The awards are part of UMA Music Group and were established in 2016 by Simon O'Kelly, Georgina Thomas and Ben Connor.

The first ceremony was held at the Troxy Theatre in London on Thursday 27 October 2016 and will be held annually each year to recognise and champion the continued growth and successes of the emerging music sector.

Since 2016, the awards have been co-hosted by Laura Whitmore of MTV and Chris Stark.

== Ceremonies ==
The first ever event took place at the Troxy Theatre in London on Thursday 27 October 2016.

The Unsigned Music Awards will return to the UK in May 2018 as the opening ceremony of The Great Escape music festival, forming part of a new deal with Live Nation.

The show will take place on Wednesday, 16 May at The Brighton Centre. Tickets go on sale in Spring 2017.

== Definition of unsigned ==
The definition of unsigned as used by the Unsigned Music Awards is any artist that is not currently in a commercially negotiated recording contract with a third party record label.

So long as an artist owns and controls the rights to their recordings and is in a position to exploit them through fixed-term licensing deals, publishing deals or any other, they shall be deemed an unsigned artist who may be considered for the Unsigned Music Awards.

An artist may still qualify for an Unsigned Music Award if they have a manager, publishing deal, live/booking agent, talent agent, sync/licensing deal, distribution deal or are 'signed' to their own record label, even if they have received outside funding.

== Eligibility and voting ==
The first annual Unsigned Music Awards recognised any music that had been released prior to the 2016 event, making up for the lack in existence of an awards show that recognises unsigned music at this time.

As of 2018, UMA awards ceremonies will recognise albums, EPs, and songs that have released between January 1 in the previous year, and March 31 in the current year, allowing artists fifteen months to work their releases to a point that it becomes notable.

The winners and nominees of the Unsigned Music Awards are selected by a panel of judges who are currently active within the mainstream music industry, working at an executive level across major music industry companies.

From 2018 (with the exemption of some categories) there will be four nominees announced within each of the seventeen categories. In order to ensure that the artists nominated for an Unsigned Music Award meet a certain criteria, three of the four nominees chosen are put forward by the UMA Voting Panel, with the remaining nominee in each category being selected from the list of applications submitted through the UMA website.

== TV and media coverage ==
In 2016, the first ever Unsigned Music Awards was televised on Monday, 31 October 2016 at 9:30pm, four days after the event took place on Sky, Freeview and Freesat via the digital TV network, Showcase.

Since 2016 UNILAD have been the official media partner for the Unsigned Music Awards.

| Year | Country | Event | Television Network | Key Media Partner |
|---|---|---|---|---|
| 2016 | United Kingdom | Unsigned Music Awards | Showcase TV | UNILAD |

== Awards ==
In 2016, there were 17 categories up for grabs at the Unsigned Music Awards. The winners are as follows:

| Category | Winner | Also Nominated For | Sponsored By | Presented By |
|---|---|---|---|---|
| UMA Icons Award | Boyce Avenue | | UMA | Laura Whitmore / Chris Stark |
| Best Album | Rothwell | Best Female Solo Act | Liquiproof | Jon Webster |
| Best Male Solo Act | Mullally | | Uber | Laura Whitmore / Chris Stark |
| Best Female Solo Act | Elle Exxe | | NKDb Cosmetics | Laura Whitmore / Chris Stark |
| Best Music Video | Gunship | Best Electronic Act | | Laura Whitmore / Chris Stark |
| Best Live Act | Brother and Bones | Best Rock Act / Best Album | Time Out London | Ray Jones |
| Best Produced / Engineered Record | Jerry Williams | Best Album | Metropolis Studios | Aamir Yaqub |
| Best International Record | Gosto | | Mood Media | Laura Whitmore / Chris Stark |
| Best International Music Video | Madyx | Best International Record | Music Gateway | Laura Whitmore / Chris Stark |
| Best Songwriter | Dani Sylvia | | BASCA | Crispin Hunt |
| Musicpreneur | Anno Domini | | BIMM | Jake Shillingford |
| Best Urban Act | Mugun | | | Caner Veli |
| Best Electronic Act | Majik | | Robertson Taylor | Laura Whitmore / Chris Stark |
| Best Rock Act | Broken Witt Rebels | Best Album | | Laura Whitmore / Chris Stark |
| Best Country / Folk Act | Westerman | | | Laura Whitmore / Chris Stark |
| Best Jazz / Blues Act | Malaika | | | Laura Whitmore / Chris Stark |
| Youth Music Award | Momac | | Youth Music Foundation | Andy Parfitt |
