= Ready or Not (Miriam Yeung album) =

Studio album Ready or Not by Miriam Yeung
- Released: 8 March 2011 (Worldwide)
- Genre: Mandopop
- Language: Mandarin

Miriam Yeung chronology
Home (2010)	Ready or Not (2011)

Ready or Not is Cantopop artist Miriam Yeung's (Chinese: 楊千嬅) third Mandarin solo studio album. It was released by East Asia Music on 8 March 2011. This is also the first Mandarin album Miriam had in eight years.

The album includes nine tracks, one of which was featured on the original soundtrack of Perfect Wedding (Chinese: 抱抱俏佳人).

== Track listing ==
1. Ready or not
2. 女人三十 (When A Woman Reaches Thirty)
3. 哭出來 (Cry)
4. 聖女不敗 (Strong Lady Never Fails)
5. 有種沉默叫想念 (Yearning is a Type of Silence)
6. 醒了 (Awake)
7. 還未完成的拼圖 (Puzzle Yet to be Finished)
8. 未完的歌 (Unfinished Song – Perfect Wedding Commercial Song)
9. 我係我 remix (I am Me – Cantonese)

== Music videos ==
1. Ready Or Not MV
2. 女人三十 (Women, Thirty) MV
3. 醒了 (Awake) MV
