= Nolimit =

Sri Lankan fashion retail chain

NOLIMIT, stylized in all caps as NOLIMIT, is a Sri Lankan fashion flagship brand which is a prominent fashion retail chain. The company is known for clothing for men, women, and children, as well as accessories and home decor items. It is regarded as the largest fashion retailer in Sri Lanka and also considered as the most popular fashion retail store in Sri Lanka.

== Corporate history ==
The company initially commenced its business operations under the name French Corner in 1992. It was founded by N.L.M. Mubarack based on the source of inspiration he obtained from his entrepreneurial leadership. The company was renamed and rebranded as Nolimit in 2005. The company's trajectory started with a typically modest outlet in the Dehiwala region and only had a capacity of 5 employees during the time of its commencement. Later on, Nolimit expanded its operations across Sri Lanka by opening up branches at 23 locations.

The company was classified in an elite list among the Top 25 Best Companies to Work for in Sri Lanka by the Great Place to Work Institute in collaboration with LMD business magazine and the Ceylon Chamber of Commerce during the time period between 2017 and 2021. The company has engaged in cost leadership marketing tactics targeting a segment of price sensitive customers and has made rapid progress with their low cost strategy to maximize market share and revenue streams. Hafiz Mubarack serves as the current managing director of the company.

Nolimit also has subsidiary affiliations such as Glitz specifically designed as a lifestyle store, Pallu focused on ethnic wear and Y Pay More as a discount store.

== Operations ==
In December 2018, Nolimit opened up its first ever pop-up retail store at K-Zone Ja-Ela and Nolimit eventually became the first Sri Lankan large-scale retail store to familiarize with the concept of pop-up store which was deemed as a noble concept in Sri Lankan context for several years.

In September 2022, Nolimit made rapid strides by venturing into overseas market when they launched their first overseas showroom in the gulf of the Middle East. In September 2022, Nolimit opened up its maiden offshore showroom in Al Ghurair, Dubai, the busy commercial capital of the United Arab Emirates. Nolimit also opened its second showroom in the UAE at Deira City Centre situated in Dubai. Nolimit further expanded its foothold in the United Arab Emirates when they opened the third showroom in the nation at the Al Wahda Mall in Abu Dhabi in November 2023.

In March 2024, the 'Garden of Glam' collection was officially launched at the Colombo City Centre's Nolimit outlet. Former Miss Universe contestant Rozanne Diasz (Miss Sri Lanka for Miss Universe 2005) attended the inauguration ceremony of Garden of Glam at the formal invitation request made by the management.
