= Broken Bones (album) =

Studio album by Dokken
- Released: September 21–25, 2012
- Recorded: 2012
- Studio: Atrium Studios, Calabasas and Total Access Recording, Redondo Beach, California
- Genre: Hard rock, glam metal
- Length: 45:08
- Label: Frontiers; King (Japan)
- Producer: Don Dokken

Dokken chronology
Greatest Hits (2010)	Broken Bones (2012)	Return To The East Live (2016) (2018)

Broken Bones is the eleventh studio album by the American heavy metal band Dokken. It was released in Europe on 21 September 2012 and in the US on September 25, 2012. It features session drummer Jimmy DeGrasso as Mick Brown couldn't record due to scheduling conflicts, which makes Broken Bones the first Dokken album without him and also their only album to feature bassist Sean McNabb.

Aside from the standard edition CD, a special edition was released in Europe with a thirty-minute DVD feature of the making of the album.

Broken Bones sold around 2,600 copies in the United States in its first week of release and landed at position No. 173 on the Billboard 200 chart.

== Track listing ==
All tracks are written by Don Dokken and Jon Levin, except where indicated.

No.	Title	Writer(s)	Length
1.	"Empire"		3:33
2.	"Broken Bones"		4:54
3.	"Best of Me"		4:18
4.	"Blind"		3:23
5.	"Waterfall"	Dokken	2:48
6.	"The Victim of the Crime"	Dokken	4:30
7.	"Burning Tears"		4:41
8.	"Today" (Jefferson Airplane cover)	Marty Balin, Paul Kantner	4:20
9.	"For the Last Time"		3:58
10.	"Fade Away"		3:46
11.	"Tonight"		4:57

Japanese edition bonus track
No.	Title	Length
12.	"Can’t Fight This Love"	5:11

== Personnel ==
=== Dokken ===
- Don Dokken - lead vocals, percussion
- Jon Levin - guitars
- Sean McNabb - bass
- Jimmy DeGrasso - drums

=== Additional musicians ===
- Mark Boals - backing vocals

=== Production ===
- Don Dokken - production
- Darian Rundall - engineering
- Bob St. John - mixing
- Tim Kelly, Mike Sutherland - additional engineering
- Wyn Davis - drum engineering, engineer and mixing on "Today"
- Chris Baseford - drum engineering
- Maor Appelbaum - mastering

== Charts ==
Chart (2012)	Peak position
US Billboard 200	173
US Hard Rock Albums	12
