= Unlimited (Miriam Yeung album) =

Studio album by Miriam Yeung
- Released: 15 December 2006
- Genre: Cantopop
- Label: Gold Label

Miriam Yeung chronology
| Single (2005) | Unlimited (2006) | Meridian (2007) |

Unlimited is a music album by Cantopop singer Miriam Yeung. It was released on 15 December 2006.

The album comes in a special hardcover booklet, filled with photographs, song lyrics, and a bound bookmark. The CD is enclosed in a sleeve that is attached to the back cover of the book.

Unlimited sold over 25,000 copies in just a two days after it was released, achieving Gold status.

== Track listing ==
1. 吻所有女孩 ("Kiss Every Girl")
2. 她成功了他沒有 ("She Succeeded, But He Did Not")
3. 毅行 ("Determination")
4. 水月鏡花 ("Moon in the Water and Flowers in the Mirror")
5. 大傻 ("Big Silly")
6. 我的生存之道 ("My Way of Life")
7. 亦舒說 ("Yi Shu Said")
8. 芬梨道上 ("On Findlay Road")
9. 我只能跳舞 ("I Could Only Dance")
10. 如果可以不停相愛 ("If We Can Love Endlessly")
11. 郎來了(ROSE) ("The Groom Had Come")
