= Change the World: An Introduction =

Compilation album by Dokken
- Released: October 11, 2004
- Genre: Heavy metal
- Length: 80:18
- Label: Sanctuary

Dokken chronology
Hell to Pay (2004)	Change the World: An Introduction (2004)	The Definitive Rock Collection (2006)

Professional ratings
Review scores
Source	Rating
AllMusic	2.5/5 stars

Change the World: An Introduction to Dokken is a compilation album by American heavy metal band Dokken, released by Sanctuary UK.

== Track listing ==
1. "Erase the Slate" - 3:47
2. "Little Girl" - 3:45
3. "Change the World" - 4:35
4. "It's Not Love" (unplugged) - 5:22
5. "Maddest Hatter" - 4:38
6. "Goodbye My Friend" - 4:05
7. "Breaking the Chains" (live) - 4:14
8. "Alone Again" (live) - 7:23
9. "Puppet on a String" - 4:22
10. "Drown" - 4:54
11. "Tooth and Nail" (unplugged) - 3:37
12. "Sunless Days" - 4:21
13. "Unchain the Night" (live) - 6:27
14. "Escape" - 4:38
15. "Crazy Mary Goes Around" - 3:00
16. "In My Dreams" (live) - 6:15
17. "Into the Fire" (unplugged) - 4:55
