= Limitless Airways =

Croatian charter airline

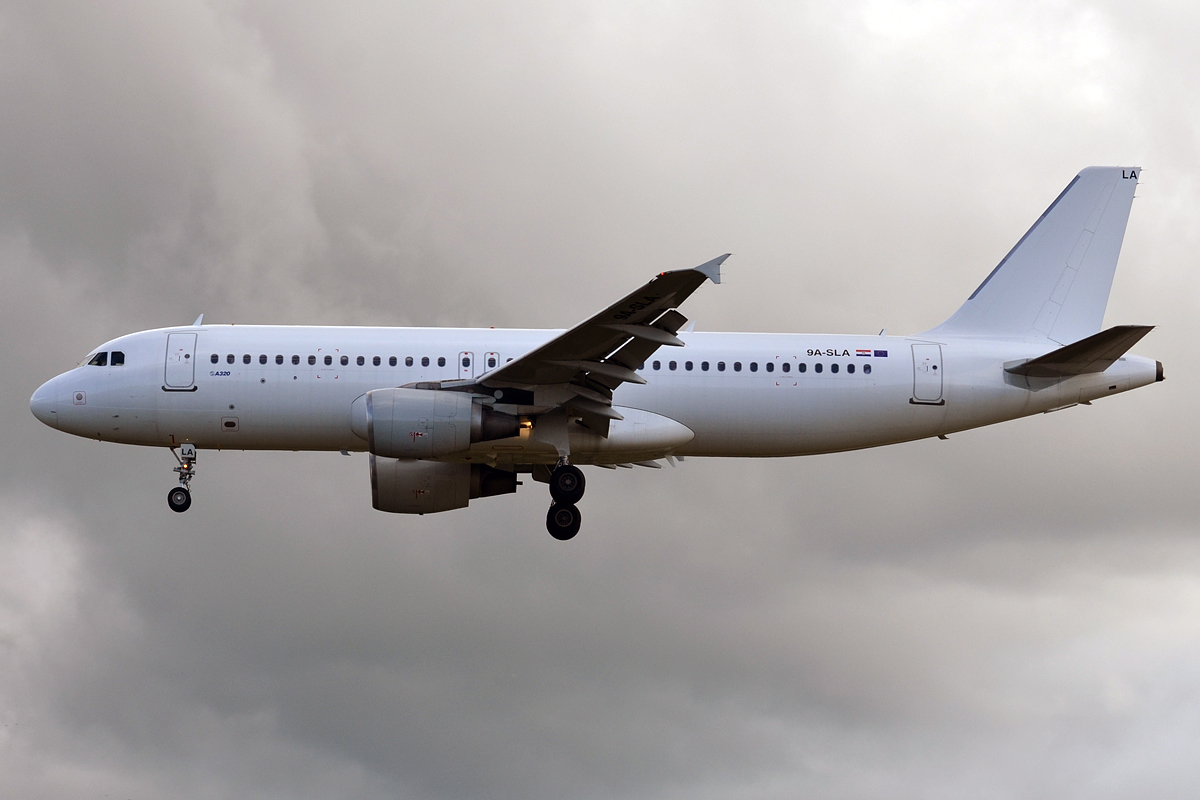
- Airbus A320-200
IATA	ICAO	Call sign
—	LIM	LIMITLESS
- Founded: 2015
- Ceased operations: 2016
- Hubs: Rijeka Airport
- Secondary hubs: Göteborg Landvetter Airport
- Fleet size: 1
- Parent company: Scandjet
- Headquarters: Omišalj, Croatia
- Website: http://www.limitlessairways.hr/

Limitless Airways was a charter airline based in Rijeka, Croatia. It was launched by Scandjet, a Swedish tour operator, and offered flights from Scandinavia to the northern Adriatic coast of Croatia and to Bosnia and Herzegovina.

== History ==
Limitless Airways was founded in January 2015 and commenced operations in May of tat same year. The company was legally registered in Croatia. In 2016, the airline ceased all operations.

== Destinations ==
^{Hub}	Hub
^{†}	Future destinations
^{‡}	Seasonal
	Terminated destinations

City	Country	IATA	ICAO	Airport
Ängelholm	Sweden	AGH	ESTA	Ängelholm-Helsingborg Airport
Catania	Italy	CTA	LICC	Catania-Fontanarossa Airport
Gothenburg	Sweden	GOT	ESGG	Göteborg Landvetter Airport
Kalmar	Sweden	KLR	ESMQ	Kalmar Airport
Karlstad	Sweden	KSD	ESOK	Karlstad Airport
Kristiansand	Norway	KRS	ENCN	Kristiansand Airport, Kjevik
Mostar	Bosnia and Herzegovina	OMO	LQMO	Mostar International Airport
Norrköping	Sweden	NRK	ESSP	Norrköping Airport
Rijeka	Croatia	RJK	LDRI	Rijeka Airport
Skellefteå	Sweden	SFT	ESNS	Skellefteå Airport
Sundsvall	Sweden	SDL	ESNN	Sundsvall-Timrå Airport
Umeå	Sweden	UME	ESNU	Umeå Airport
Zadar	Croatia	ZAD	LDZD	Zadar Airport

== Fleet ==
The Limitless Airways fleet consisted of the following aircraft (as of August 2016):

Limitless Airways fleet
Aircraft	Total	Order	Passengers			Notes
Aircraft	Total	Order	C	Y	Total	Notes
Airbus A320-200	1	-	-	180	180	
Total	1	0				
