= Change the World (Martha Munizzi album) =

Live album by Martha Munizzi
- Released: April 1, 2008
- Genre: CCM
- Length: 72:38
- Label: Say the Name

Martha Munizzi chronology
No Limits: Live (2006)	Change the World (2008)	Make It Loud (2011)

Professional ratings
Review scores
Source	Rating
AllMusic	4/5 stars

Change the World is a live album from Christian singer Martha Munizzi. The album was released on April 1, 2008.

== Track listing ==
All songs written by Israel Houghton, Aaron Lindsey, and Martha Munizzi, except where noted.

• 01. — "Invincible God" — 04:54

• 02. — "Invincible — Overture" — 00:47

• 03. — "Nothing Can Separate Me" (Lindsey) — 04:15

• 04. — "Dance" — 04:33

• 05. — "Dance" (Reprise) (Feat. Ricardo Sanchéz) — 03:17

• 06. — "Favor Of God" (Lindsey, Rowsey) — 05:20

• 07. — "Favor Of God" (Reprise) (Lindsey, Rowsey) — 03:24

• 08. — "Spoken Word — Interlude" — 01:37

• 09. — "More Than Enough" (Houghton, Munizzi) — 06:57

• 10. — "Wrap Me In Your Arms" (Gungor) — 07:29

• 11. — "Jesus Loves Me" (Anna Bartlett Warner) — 00:47

• 12. — "Forever Always" (Lindsey, Munizzi) — 04:11

• 13. — "I Receive Your Love" — 04:58

• 14. — "The King" — 05:09

• 15. — "Habitation" — 08:39

• 16. — "Change The World" — 06:21

== Awards ==
Change the World won a Dove Award for Contemporary Gospel Album of the Year at the 40th GMA Dove Awards. The song "Favor of God" was also nominated for a Dove Award for Contemporary Gospel Recorded Song of the Year.

== Chart performance ==
The album peaked at #135 on Billboard 200, #6 on Billboard's Christian Albums, #4 on Billboard's Gospel Albums, and #17 on Billboard's Independent Albums. It spent 61 weeks on the Gospel Albums charts.
