= No Limits (EP) =

EP by Boyce Avenue
- Released: April 22, 2014
- Recorded: 2013–2014
- Genre: Alternative rock; pop rock
- Length: 25:59
- Label: 3 Peace
- Producer: Boyce Avenue

Boyce Avenue chronology
All We Have Left (2010)	No Limits (2014)	Road Less Traveled (2016)

Singles from No Limits
- 1. "One Life" Released: November 3, 2013; 2. "I'll Be the One" Released: March 23, 2014; 3. "Speed Limit" Released: May 18, 2014

No Limits is the fifteenth extended play (and first of original material) recorded by Puerto Rican-American rock band Boyce Avenue. It was released to digital retailers April 22, 2014 through the band's independent label 3 Peace Records. In May 2014, No Limits entered the Billboard Heatseekers Albums chart at No. 14.

== Background and recording ==
In the four years since the band's last official release (2010's All We Have Left), Boyce Avenue has become the most-subscribed-to and third most-watched band on YouTube due to their popular covers of contemporary pop hits, and has been extensively touring across the globe, including opening for select dates on One Direction's Up All Night Tour. Returning to their roots of writing and producing original songs, the band began recording original material in 2013. One of these new songs, "One Life" was released in November 2013, with all proceeds from digital downloads of the song going to the charity organization Pencils of Promise.

Distributed independently through the band's 3 Peace Records after they left Universal Records in August 2011, No Limits was written, recorded, and produced by the Manzano brothers. The EP contains a more electronic and pop-influenced sound than their signature acoustic rock, including a collaboration with EDM producer Milkman. Frontman Alejandro stated in a release for their GMA appearance that the EP "showcases our experiences these past few years" and that pop music has "really inspired the direction of our music."

== Promotion ==
The band toured Europe in March and April 2014 to promote the EP, with the original March release date pushed back to April 22, 2014. They also made an appearance on Good Morning America on April 29 to perform their single "I'll Be the One". No Limits is intended as an introduction to the new era of Boyce Avenue, with a full-length album planned for later in the year.

=== Singles ===
"One Life" was released as the official lead single from the EP on November 3, 2013. The same day, a music video for the "Collab Version" featuring over a dozen other YouTube stars premiered on YouTube. The official music video premiered December 29, 2013.

The Milkman collaboration, "I'll Be the One" was released March 23, 2014 as the second official single when it was posted to the band's official SoundCloud page. The song was performed (without Milkman) on Good Morning America.

"Speed Limit" was released as the third official single on May 18, 2014. The music video premiered on the band's official YouTube channel that day.

== Critical reception ==
Ana Perez of The Pearl Post gave the EP a mixed review, writing that "the seven-track EP struggled to find its own voice with each song sounding strikingly similar to each other," but noted that in spite of this, "the purpose behind their music stayed strong throughout." British music blog All-Noise described the EP as a "downbeat but evocative collection of songs with a strong OneRepublic and The Script vibe"; reviewer Philip Lickley also commented on the similar-sounding songs but nevertheless rated the EP 7/10, calling it a "great EP ... definitely worth grabbing."

== Track listing ==
No.	Title	Length
1.	"Speed Limit"	3:40
2.	"One Life"	3:50
3.	"I Had to Try"	3:37
4.	"Scars"	3:34
5.	"I'll Be the One" (featuring Milkman)	3:41
6.	"Speed Limit" (Acoustic)	3:50
7.	"One Life" (Acoustic)	3:47
Total length:		25:59

== Chart performance ==
Chart (2014)	Peak position
US Heatseekers Albums (Billboard)	14
