= Lightning Strikes Again =

Studio album by Dokken
- Released: April 8, 2008
- Recorded: 2007
- Studio: Chop Shop, Hollywood and Total Access Recording, Redondo Beach, California
- Genre: Hard rock, heavy metal
- Length: 54:44
- Label: Rhino (US); Frontiers (Europe); King (Japan)
- Producer: Don Dokken, Tim David Kelly

Dokken chronology
From Conception: Live 1981 (2007)	Lightning Strikes Again (2008)	Greatest Hits (2010)

Professional ratings
Review scores
Source	Rating
AllMusic	3.5/5 stars
Imperiumi	(Unrated)

Lightning Strikes Again is the tenth studio album by the American heavy metal band Dokken. It was originally scheduled for release on October 24, 2007, in Japan and on October 29 worldwide, but was postponed until 2008. The album was eventually released in the UK on April 8, 2008, and in the US on May 13. The album entered the Billboard Top 200 at No. 133, the band's best chart performance since 2004. It received some of the best reviews since the band's classic era in the 1980s. The album title comes from a track from their 1985 album Under Lock and Key. The album is also the last to feature bassist Barry Sparks and drummer Mick Brown.

== Track listing ==
All tracks are written by Don Dokken and Jon Levin, except where noted.

No.	Title	Writer(s)	Length
1.	"Standing on the Outside"		3:52
2.	"Give Me a Reason"		3:50
3.	"Heart to Stone"		3:56
4.	"Disease"	Mick Brown, Dokken	3:30
5.	"How I Miss Your Smile"	Dokken	4:01
6.	"Oasis"		3:40
7.	"Point of No Return"		4:23
8.	"I Remember"	Dokken	4:48
9.	"Judgement Day"		4:02
10.	"It Means"		4:42
11.	"Release Me"		5:45
12.	"This Fire"		4:42

European edition bonus track
No.	Title	Writer(s)	Length
13.	"Sunset Superstar"	Dokken, Levin, Brown	3:38

Japanese edition bonus track
No.	Title	Length
13.	"Leave Me Alone"	4:18

== Personnel ==
=== Dokken ===
- Don Dokken – vocals, producer
- Jon Levin – lead and rhythm guitars
- Barry Sparks – bass guitar
- Mick Brown – drums

=== Production ===
- Tim David Kelly – co-producer, engineer
- Wyn Davis – engineer, mixing, mastering, keyboards on "How I Miss Your Smile"
- Chris Baseford, Mike Sutherland, Mike Lesniak, Mike Sheraton – engineers

== Charts ==
Chart (2008)	Peak position
US Billboard 200	133
US Hard Rock Albums	18
US Independent Albums	39
