= Greatest Hits (Dokken album) =

Compilation album by Dokken
- Released: May 4, 2010 (US); May 11, 2010 (Japan)
- Recorded: 2010
- Studios: Total Access Recording, Redondo Beach, California
- Genres: Heavy metal, hard rock
- Length: 53:38
- Labels: Deadline/Cleopatra (US); King (Japan)
- Producer: Don Dokken

Dokken chronology
Lightning Strikes Again (2008)	Greatest Hits (2010)	Broken Bones (2012)

Professional ratings
Review scores
Source	Rating
AllMusic	1.5/5 stars

Greatest Hits is a compilation album by heavy metal band Dokken. It is a collection of re-recorded 1980s hits along with two new tracks. On March 1, 2010, it was digitally released to iTunes and Amazon.com. The physical album with additional tracks was released in the US by Cleopatra Records on May 4, 2010, and in Japan on May 11, 2010, by King Records. On June 14, 2011, it was re-released by Store For Music LTD under the new title The Anthems with a new cover. The Anthems contains both of the bonus tracks from the Japanese edition of Greatest Hits.

== Track listing ==
1. "Just Got Lucky" (George Lynch, Jeff Pilson) - 4:35
2. "Breaking the Chains" (Don Dokken, Lynch) - 3:51
3. "Into the Fire" (Dokken, Lynch, Pilson) - 4:29
4. "The Hunter" (Dokken, Lynch, Pilson, Mick Brown) - 4:04
5. "In My Dreams" (Dokken, Lynch, Pilson, Brown) - 4:33
6. "It's Not Love" (Dokken, Lynch, Pilson, Brown) - 5:03
7. "Alone Again" (Dokken, Pilson) - 4:24
8. "Dream Warriors" (Lynch, Pilson)- 4:46
9. "Unchain the Night" (Dokken, Lynch, Pilson, Brown) - 5:22
10. "Tooth and Nail" (Lynch, Pilson, Brown) - 3:38
11. "Almost Over" (Dokken, Jon Levin) - 5:54 (2010 new track)
12. "Magic Man" (Dokken, Levin) - 3:53 (2010 new track)

Japanese edition bonus tracks

13. "Bus Stop" (Graham Gouldman) - 3:38 (The Hollies cover)
14. "Lies" (Buddy Randell, Beau Charles) - 2:46 (The Knickerbockers cover)

== Personnel ==
=== Dokken ===
- Don Dokken – vocals
- Jon Levin – guitars
- George Lynch – guitars
- Jeff Pilson - Bass
- Barry Sparks – bass
- Sean McNabb – bass on tracks 13 and 14
- Mick Brown – drums, lead vocals on track 14

=== Production ===
- Mike Lesniak, Darian Rundall – engineering
- Michael Wagener, Wyn Davis – mixing
- Mike Sutherland – assistant mixing
