= Japan Live '95 =

Live album by Dokken
- Released: September 9, 2003
- Recorded: March 2, 1995
- Venues: Tokyo Kōsei Nenkin Kaikan, Japan
- Genre: Heavy metal
- Length: 73:21
- Labels: T&T / Sanctuary

Dokken chronology
Long Way Home (2002)	Japan Live '95 (2003)	Alone Again and Other Hits (2003)

Japan Live '95

Video by Dokken
- Released: September 9, 2003
- Recorded: March 2, 1995
- Venues: Tokyo Kōsei Nenkin Kaikan, Japan
- Genre: Heavy metal
- Length: 134 min.
- Label: Sanctuary

Dokken video albums chronology
Live from the Sun (200)	Japan Live '95

Professional ratings
Review scores
Source	Rating
AllMusic	2.5/5 stars
Scream Magazine	1/6 stars

Japan Live '95 is a recording of a live concert performance by American heavy metal band Dokken at the Kosei Nenkin Hall, Tokyo, Japan in 1995.

== Track listing ==
1. "Tooth and Nail" - 3:45
2. "When Heaven Comes Down" - 4:06
3. "Into the Fire" - 4:46
4. "Kiss of Death" - 5:33
5. "Shadows of Life" - 4:05
6. "The Maze" - 5:14
7. "Long Way Home" - 5:38
8. "Breaking the Chains" - 4:13
9. "Unchain the Night" - 6:26
10. "Nothing Left to Say" - 4:48
11. "I Will Remember" - 4:29
12. "Alone Again" - 7:22
13. "Mr. Scary" - 4:33
14. "It's Not Love" - 8:23

== Personnel ==
- Don Dokken - vocals, guitar
- George Lynch - lead guitar
- Jeff Pilson - bass, backing vocals
- Mick Brown - drums, backing vocals

Audio by Chris Raughley live sound engineer in 1995 for Dokken

== See also ==
- Big in Japan
