= Limited Edition Sportswear =

Australian sports equipment company

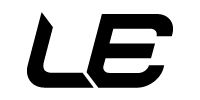
- Company type: Private
- Industry: Textile
- Founded: 2008
- Founder: Kris Pillay
- Headquarters: 71 Eagle Street; Brisbane, Australia
- Area served: Oceania
- Products: Sportswear
- Owner: Kris Pillay
- Website: lesportswear.com

Limited Edition Sportswear, generally styled as LE, is an Australian sportswear clothing company which was established in 2008 in the city of Brisbane in Queensland. It is owned by its founder, Kris Pillay. Its slogan is "Cultured by Choice Branded with Innovation". The company has a network of suppliers in UK, Australia, Pacific Islands including Samoa, Fiji, New Zealand and Papua New Guinea.

== Sponsorships ==
=== Rugby Union ===
- Samoa (since 2016 – Until 2020)

=== Rugby League ===
- Fiji (2013-2017)
- Wellington Rugby League
- South Island Scorpions
- Northern Swords
