= Home (Miriam Yeung EP) =

EP by Miriam Yeung
- Released: 7 October 2010 (Worldwide)
- Genre: Cantopop
- Language: Cantonese
- Label: Capital Artists

Miriam Yeung chronology
Miriam Yeung New and Best Selections (2010)	Home (2010)	Ready or Not (2010)

Home is Cantopop artist Miriam Yeung's (Chinese: 楊千嬅) seventh EP album. It was released by Capital Artists on 7 October 2010.

The album includes five new songs, two of which were featured in her movies: Love in a Puff (Chinese: 志明與春嬌) and Perfect Wedding (Chinese: 抱抱俏佳人). The album also included four music videos.

== Track listing ==
1. 呼吸需要 (Breathing Needs—Song in Love in a Puff)
2. 斗零踭 (High Heels)
3. 飲酒思源2.0 (When Drinking Wine, Remember Its Origin version 2)
4. 初見 (First Sight—Song in Perfect Wedding)
5. 我係我 (I Am Me)

== Music videos ==
1. 呼吸需要 (Breathing Needs) MV
2. 斗零踭 (High Heels) MV
3. 飲酒思源2.0 (When Drinking Wine, Remember Its Origin version 2) MV
4. 初見 (First Sight) MV

== Awards and Recognitions ==
Song	Award	Ref
斗零踭 (High Heels)	Metro Showbiz Hit Awards – Hit Song	
斗零踭 (High Heels)	Jade Solid Gold Top 10 Awards – Top 10 Songs	
初見 (First Sight); Along with Raymond Lam	Jade Solid Gold Top 10 Awards – Most Popular Duet – Gold Award	
我係我 (I am Me)	Ultimate Song Chart Awards – Ultimate Top 10 Songs	
