= From Conception: Live 1981 =

Live album by Dokken
- Released: March 13, 2007
- Recorded: December 1983
- Genre: Heavy metal
- Length: 48:36
- Labels: Rhino (US); Frontiers (Europe and Japan)

Dokken chronology
The Definitive Rock Collection (2006)	From Conception: Live 1981 (2007)	Lightning Strikes Again (2008)

Professional ratings
Review scores
Source	Rating
AllMusic	4/5 stars

From Conception: Live 1981 is a live album by American heavy metal band Dokken, released in 2007.

This album contains rare live recordings allegedly from 1981, before the band released its first album Breaking the Chains. However, the performance is more likely to be from December 1983, as the set list exactly matches known set lists from that time. Moreover, Jeff Pilson is listed as the bass guitar player on the recording, something that could not have been possible in 1981 since Juan Croucier played bass guitar for the group until after 1982. The song "Live to Rock" is featured on this album under this title, but in 1981 this song had different lyrics and was known under the title "We're Illegal". Finally, according to Pilson, the recording is actually from a King Biscuit Flower Hour broadcast from December 1983. Why the album has been marketed as being from 1981 is unknown.

There are three previously unreleased songs included on the album: "Goin' Down", "Hit and Run" and "You're a Liar", as well slightly rearranged versions of some tracks from the Breaking the Chains album such as "Paris Is Burning", "Breakin' the Chains" or "Nightrider".

== Track listing ==
1. "Paris Is Burning" - 4:48
2. "Goin' Down" - 3:42
3. "In the Middle" - 4:53
4. "Young Girls" - 3:55
5. "Hit and Run" - 3:51
6. "Nightrider" - 8:15
7. "Guitar Solo" - 2:58
8. "Live to Rock" - 5:05
9. "Breakin' the Chains" - 6:24
10. "You're a Liar" - 4:46

== Personnel ==
- Don Dokken - vocals, rhythm guitar
- George Lynch - lead guitar
- Jeff Pilson - bass guitar
- Mick Brown - drums
