= Martha Munizzi =

American singer-songwriter

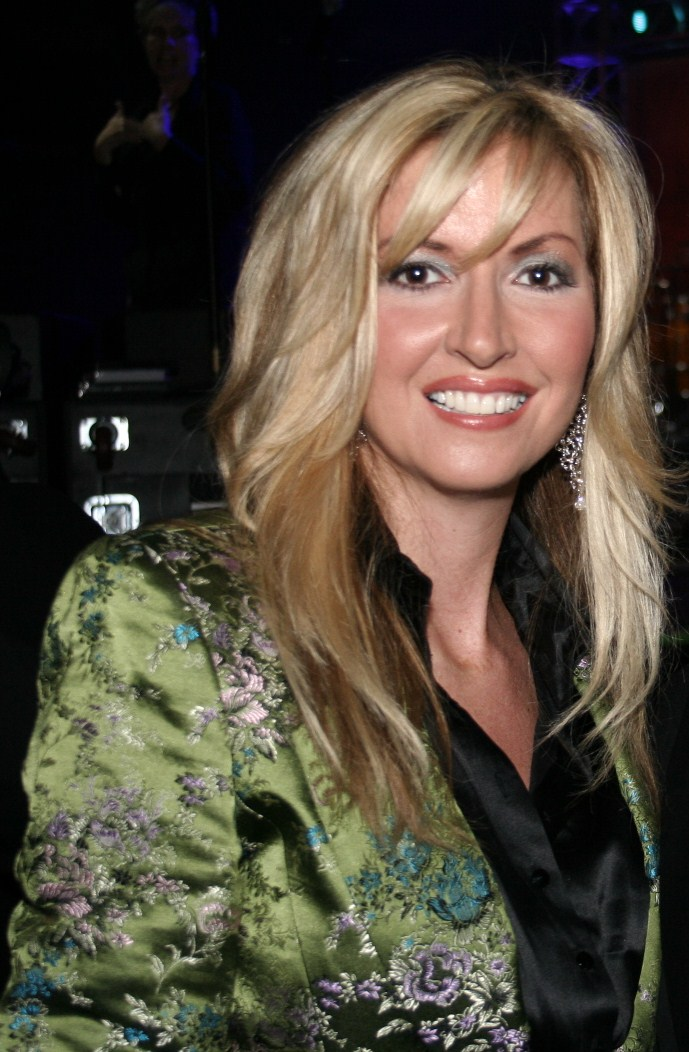

Background information
- Born: Martha Denise Stallings; February 26, 1968 (age 58); Lakeland, Florida
- Origin: Orlando, Florida
- Genres: Contemporary Christian music; gospel; praise & worship
- Years active: 1987–present
- Labels: Martha Munizzi Music; Integrity Media; Columbia Records
- Website: marthamunizzi.com

Martha Denise Munizzi (born February 26, 1968) is an American Christian music singer, songwriter, author, and pastor.

== Early years ==
A native of central Florida, Martha Munizzi was born into a Christian musical family. The daughter of evangelists, Martha and her twin sister Mary Alessi were born in Lakeland, Florida, and grew up traveling and ministering through music with her family. She began performing at age 8, touring the country with her family in concerts and crusades around the United States and Canada.

Martha, Mary, and their older sister Marvelyne were born with their parents' talent for music and became a part of the traveling family group as kids. The family settled in Orlando, Florida, when Mary and Martha were 12, so that the children could attend formal, public school.

At age 16, Mary, Martha and Marveline (age 18) helped form a praise and worship band at the urging of a church friend. That group evolved into Testament and became popular enough to travel around the state of Florida performing in churches and at conferences and other events.

One year after completing high school (1986), Martha married Dan Munizzi, who was a keyboard and bass player in the band Testament. In 1993 she and Dan became the music directors and founding members of a new, fledgling church in Orlando, Florida, initially leading a congregation of 250 and a choir of about 30 people that eventually grew in 8 years into a 5000-member congregation and a 200-member music team. They remained there until 2001.

She led worship at Lakewood Church while Cindy Cruse-Ratcliff was on maternity leave.

== Musical career ==
Along with figures like Ron Kenoly, CeCe Winans, and Israel Houghton, Munizzi is described as pioneering cross-cultural worship music that connects with both black and white Christian congregations.

Munizzi's songs are self-published under the name Say The Name Publishing/Martha Munizzi Music. She released her first Praise & Worship/Gospel album, Say the Name (2002), followed by The Best Is Yet to Come (2003) and When He Came (2004), both of which debuted high on Billboard's Gospel chart. The Best Is Yet to Come peaked at No. 2 on the Billboard Music Top Gospel Album charts in 2004 and remained on the charts for more than a year.

In 2004, Munizzi had two music albums in the top five on Billboard's Gospel charts at the same time (The Best Is Yet to Come at No. 2 and When He Came at No. 5) and Billboard Magazine named her as one of the top five Gospel Artists for 2004. Additionally, her project The Best Is Yet to Come was named one of the top ten selling Gospel projects for 2004.

In 2005, she signed a distribution deal with Integrity Media, Inc. Under this agreement, her previously released albums The Best Is Yet To Come and Say The Name and all future releases were to be distributed to Christian retail outlets through Provident-Integrity Distribution and to general market outlets on the Epic Records (a division of Sony-BMG Distribution).

In 2006, Munizzi released her next CD entitled No Limits Live. This CD debuted on Billboard's Top Gospel Charts at No. 1 and remained at the top of the charts for 6 weeks.

Munizzi has ministered with several popular Christian ministries including; Joel Osteen, Creflo Dollar, Joyce Meyer, Benny Hinn, CeCe Winans, and Bishop T.D. Jakes. She has also appeared on Trinity Broadcasting Network's (TBN's) Praise The Lord, on the Daystar Television Network, on Life Today with James Robison, and on Black Entertainment Television's BET Celebration Of Gospel. Additionally she performed as a part of the 3rd annual "Sisters In The Spirit" tour with Yolanda Adams, Kelly Price, Juanita Bynum, Rizen and Sheila E in 2005. She was also a featured performer with Kirk Franklin at the "Imagine Me" all-star celebrity benefit concert on January 11, 2007, at the Opryland Hotel in Nashville, Tennessee. The concert was a benefit for the Children's Defense Fund.

Munizzi also performed with the Gospel trio Virtue on their 2006 album Testimony on the song Praises to You. She also performs her song Glorious live on Donna Richardson-Joyner's 2006 exercise video entitled Sweating in the Spirit 2. Her twin sister, Mary Alessi, performs with her on her 2006 album No Limits Live.

The CD/DVD project, Change the World was released on April 1, 2008. The project was recorded on December 7, 2007, and features Israel Houghton, Mary Alessi, Micah Stampley, Bishop Joseph Garlington, and Ricardo Sanchez.

On April 24, 2011, Munizzi released Make it Loud her first self-produced CD. The new project features William McDowell, Michael Gungor, Jonathan Stockstill, Lori Morrison, Daniel Eric Groves, and the debut of Danielle Munizzi, her daughter.

On August 27, 2021, Munizzi released Best Days, with a new single "Fight for Me".

== Personal life ==
Munizzi married Dan Munizzi in 1987 and they have three children: Danielle, Nicole, and Nathan. Martha and Dan currently pastor Epic Life Church in Orlando, Florida.

== Discography ==
Year	Album details	Peak chart positions
2002	Say the Name: Released: July 16; Label: Martha Munizzi Music; Format: CD	
2003	The Best Is Yet to Come: Released: July 8; Label: Martha Munizzi Music; Format: CD, DVD	No. 2 - Top Gospel Albums; No. 13 - Top Independent Albums; No. 8 - Billboard Top Heatseekers; No. 179 - The Billboard 200; No. 6 - Billboard Top Christian Albums
2004	When He Came: Released: October 19; Label: Martha Munizzi Music; Format: CD	No. 5 - Billboard Top Gospel Albums; No. 32 - Billboard Top Independent Albums; No. 28 - Billboard Top Heatseekers; No. 22 - Billboard Top Christian Albums
2006	No Limits: Live: Released: March 14; Label: Martha Munizzi Music; Format: CD, DVD	No. 1 - Billboard Top Gospel Albums; No. 60 - The Billboard 200; No. 2 - Billboard Top Christian Albums
2008	Change The World: Released: April 1; Label: Martha Munizzi Music; Format: CD	No. 4 - Billboard Top Gospel Albums; No. 135 - The Billboard 200; No. 3 - Billboard Top Christian Albums
2011	Make It Loud: Released: April 26; Label: Martha Munizzi Music; Format: CD	No. 6 - Billboard Top Gospel Albums; No. 141 - The Billboard 200; No. 27 - Top Independent Albums
2021	Best Days: Released: August 27; Label: Martha Munizzi Music; Format: CD, digital download	

== Awards and nominations ==
=== Dove Awards ===
The Dove Awards are awarded annually by the Gospel Music Association. Munizzi has earned 1 award from 10 nominations.

Year	Nominated work	Award	Result
2005	Contemporary Gospel Recorded Song of the Year	"Because of Who You Are"	Nominated
2005	Contemporary Gospel Recorded Song of the Year	"Say Thy Name"	Nominated
2006	Contemporary Gospel Album of the Year	When He Came	Nominated
2007	Contemporary Gospel Album of the Year	No Limits Live	Nominated
2007	Contemporary Gospel Recorded Song of the Year	"No Limits"	Nominated
2009	Contemporary Gospel Recorded Song of the Year	"Favor of God"	Nominated
2009	Contemporary Gospel Album of the Year	Change The World	Won
2012	Contemporary Gospel Album of the Year	Make It Loud	Nominated
2012	Praise & Worship Album of the Year	Make It Loud	Nominated
2012	Urban Recorded Song of the Year	"Make It Loud"	Nominated

=== Grammy Awards ===
The Grammy Awards are awarded annually by the National Academy of Recording Arts and Sciences. Munizzi has earned 1 nomination.

Year	Award	Nominated work	Result
2006	Best Traditional Soul Gospel Album	Say Thy Name	Nominated

=== Stellar Awards ===
The Stellar Awards are awarded annually by SAGMA. Munizzi has earned 4 awards from 9 nominations.

Year	Award	Nominated work	Result
2005	New Artist of the Year	The Best Is Yet To Come	Won
2005	Female Vocalist of the Year	The Best Is Yet To Come	Nominated
2006	Special Event CD of the Year	When He Came	Won
2007	Artist of the Year	No Limits... Live	Nominated
2007	Contemporary Female Vocalist of the Year	No Limits... Live	Nominated
2012	Recorded Music Package of the Year	Make It Loud	Won
2012	Female Vocalist of the Year	Make It Loud	Nominated
2012	Music Video of the Year - Short Form	"Excellent"	Nominated
2022	Traditional Female Artist of the Year	Best Days	Won

=== Miscellaneous awards and honors ===
Year	Organization	Award	Nominated work	Result
2006	Oasis Awards	International Female Artist of the Year	Herself	Won
2007	Christian Music Awards	Female Artist of the Year	Herself	Won
2007	CCM Magazine Readers Choice Awards	Female Artist of the Year	No Limits... Live	Nominated
2007	CCM Magazine Readers Choice Awards	Praise & Worship CD of the Year	No Limits... Live	Nominated
2007	CCM Magazine Readers Choice Awards	Worship Artist of the Year	No Limits... Live	Nominated
2024	Women Songwriters Hall of Fame		Herself	Inducted
