= No Limits (Martha Munizzi album) =

No Limits: Live [2 CD]

Live album by Martha Munizzi
- Released: March 4, 2006
- Genre: CCM
- Length: 105:52
- Label: Sony, Martha Munizzi Music/Say The Name Publishing

Martha Munizzi chronology
When He Came (2004)	No Limits: Live [2 CD] (2006)	Change the World (2008)

Professional ratings
Review scores
Source	Rating
AllMusic	4/5 stars

No Limits: Live is a live album from Gospel music singer Martha Munizzi. The album was released on March 4, 2006.

== Track listing ==
=== Disc 1 ===
All songs written by Martha Munizzi, except where noted.

1. "No Limits (Breakthrough)" (Greenley, Saunders, Thomas) - 05:00
2. "Till The Walls Fall" (Munizzi, Reed) - 06:28
3. "Till The Walls Fall (Reprise)" (Munizzi, Reed) - 02:20
4. "Name Above All Names" - 06:30
5. "Great Exchange (Prelude)" - 03:04
6. "Great Exchange" - 06:03
7. "Renew Me" - 08:25
8. "Prophetic (Interlude)" - 02:25
9. "Forever You're My King" (Mitchell) - 03:48
10. "What He's Done" - 04:08
11. "Amazing Love (P.D.)" (Campbell, Wesley) - 00:47
12. "Amazing Love" (Kendrick) - 03:32

=== Disc 2 ===
All songs written by Martha Munizzi, except where noted.

1. "Always Welcome" (Alessi, Cruse-Ratcliff) - 07:47
2. "Holy Spirit Fill This Room" (Munizzi, Munizzi) - 02:51
3. "Come Holy Spirit" (Alessi) - 03:21
4. "He's Already Provided" - 08:10
5. "I Believe God" (Hall, Munizzi) - 05:07
6. "While You Worship (Chandler's Song)" - 06:15
7. "You've Been So Good" (Munizzi, Reed) - 05:36
8. "You've Been So Good (Reprise)" (Munizzi, Reed) - 01:24
9. "Jesus Is The Best Thing" (Chambers, Munizzi) - 08:03
10. "Chosen Generation" - 04:59

== Awards ==
No Limits was nominated to a Dove Award for Contemporary Gospel Album of the Year at the 38th GMA Dove Awards.

== Chart performance ==
The album peaked at #60 on Billboard 200, #2 on Billboard's Christian Albums, and #1 on Billboard's Gospel Albums, where it stayed for 72 weeks. The song "No Limits (Breakthrough)" peaked at No. 27 on Billboard's Gospel Songs chart.
