= Mary Alessi =

American singer

- Origin: Lakeland, Florida, United States
- Genres: Gospel, Contemporary Christian, Inspirational/Worship
- Years active: 1987–present
- Label: Miami Life Sounds

Mary Alessi is a Christian songwriter and Worship leader.

== Personal life ==
Mary and her husband Steve currently serve as pastors of Metro Life Church, a nondenominational congregation established in 1997 in Doral, Florida.

Mary has served as a full-time minister since 1987 when she was designated as a music director and Worship Leader. She is ordained as a minister by the Full Gospel Fellowship in Dallas, Texas.

== Discography ==
Whatever It Takes

- Released: July 8, 2003
- Format: CD
- Label: Miami Life Sounds

More

- Released: July 19, 2005
- Format: CD
- Label: Miami Life Sounds
- Chart position: Peaked at #44 on Billboard magazine's Top Gospel Album

More

- Format: DVD
- Label: Miami Life Sounds

When Women Worship

- Released: January 2, 2007
- Format: CD
- Label: Miami Life Sounds
- Chart position: #13 Top Gospel Albums, #37 Top Christian Albums, #34 Top Heatseekers

Atmosphere Volume 2 featuring Mary Alessi

- Format: CD
- Label: Miami Life Sounds

=== Appearance in other projects ===
No Limits Live

- Released: March 14, 2006
- Format: CD
- Label: Martha Munizzi Music
- Chart position: # 60 on the Billboard 200

No Limits Live

- Released: March 14, 2006
- Format: DVD
- Label: Martha Munizzi Music

Pressing On

- Released: September 21, 2010
- Format: CD
- Label: Miami Life Sounds
- Tracks: 15

== See also ==
- Worship music
- List of Christian worship music artists
