= Tim David Kelly =

American singer

- Genres: Alternative, Rock, Metal
- Occupations: Musician, songwriter, producer, mixer, composer
- Years active: 1994–present
- Labels: MCA, Headliner, Mityma, Ultradose
- Website: timdavidkelly.com

Tim David Kelly is an American musician, songwriter, record producer, TV/film composer & rock music content creator. He is a founding member, singer, guitarist and songwriter for the alternative rock band Kicking Harold whose still popular song "Gasoline" from Space Age Breakdown was featured as the main theme for 8 seasons (72 episodes)on TLC's automobile make-over show, Overhaulin'. Kelly has written many songs for others, including co-writing "Money For That" for the band Shiny Toy Guns. He has produced several albums, including co-producing Lightning Strikes Again by Dokken. Kelly has composed main themes and music cues used in television and film including Gene Simmons Family Jewels (A&E) & Little Steven's Underground Garage. Since 2022, Kelly has created thousands of short videos with stories about rock artists. As of Aug 2026, he has 900,000 followers on his "Tim from Kicking Harold" social media platforms.

== Discography ==
Albums with Kicking Harold

• Darker Angels (Ultradose) (2022) - Vocals, Guitars, Bass, Drums, Producer, Mixer, Songwriter

- Red Light District (Ultradose) (2015) – Vocals, Guitars, Bass, Drums, Producer, Mixer, Songwriter
- Zombies, Cars & Evil Guitars (Mityma) (2010) – Vocals, Guitars, Bass, Drums, producer, Mixer, songwriter
- Space Age Breakdown (Re-Release) (Mityma) (2006) – Vocals, Guitars, producer, Mixer, songwriter
- Space Age Breakdown (Mityma) (2002) – Vocals, Guitars, producer, Mixer, songwriter
- Return of the Bulb Men (Headliner) (1997) – Vocals, Guitars, Bass, songwriter
- Ugly & Festering (Re-Release) (MCA) (1996) – Vocals, Guitars, songwriter
- Ugly & Festering (Headliner) (1995) – Vocals, Guitars, songwriter
- EP (Self released demo) (1994) – Vocals, Guitars, songwriter

Albums as Tim David Kelly

- '"Burn One Down" EP (Headliner) (1997) – Vocals, Guitars, Bass, Songwriter
- '"Growing Up Naked'" (Fuzztone) (2001) – Vocals, Guitars, Bass, Producer, Mixer, Songwriter

Albums with Zombie Oil

- "Waiting For The Sun" (Ultradose Music) (2013) – Vocalist, Bassist, Producer, Songwriter

Albums with The Bloodshot Gamblers

- "Pain & Other Simple Pleasures" (Demon Deluxe) (2011) – Vocals, Guitars, Drums, Producer, Mixer, Songwriter

Albums with Marshal Gold*

"Alchemy" (Ultradose Music) (2020) – Vocals, Guitars, Drums, Producer, Mixer, Songwriter

== Album credits ==
- SHINY TOY GUNS, "Season Of Poison" (Motown/Universal) – Songwriter
- DOKKEN, "Lightning Strikes Again" (Rhino) – Recording Engineer, Co-Producer
- DOKKEN, "Broken Bones" (Frontiers) – Recording Engineer
- THE SKIES OF AMERICA, "Shine" (National Recorder) – Bass on US Tour
- DINA D'ALESSANDRO, "Is It Safe" (Worker Ants Music) – Producer, Mixer
- THE WYATTS "The Wyatts" (Self Release) – Producer, Mixer, Drums, Guitars
- ESCAPING ZANE, "In Wants Out " (Self Release) – Producer, Mixer, Bass, Guitars
- THE SOUL MITES, "Faith Healer " (Self-Release) – Mixer
- JOHN DIGRAZIA, "John Digrazia" (JDMP) – Producer, Mixer,
- VYLAN, "Ultra Suede" (Crash) – Guitars, Bass, Drums, Producer, Mixer, Songwriter
- NEVERSHINE, "Hyposonicvelocity" (DK) – Producer, Mixer
- ZANE, "Multiple Personality Disorder" (Grestone) – Bass

== TV/Film Credits ==
- "OVERHAULIN" (TLC), Main title theme song – Songwriter, Producer, Guitarist, Vocals
- "HERE COMES THE BOOM" (SONY), Music featured in TV ad campaign – Composer
- "GENE SIMMON'S FAMILY JEWELS" (A&E), Music featured in series – Co-Composer
- "LITTLE STEVEN'S UNDERGROUND GARAGE " (MTV), Main title theme song – Songwriter, Producer, Artist
- "PLAYMANIA / QUIZNATION " (GSN), Main title theme song – Co-Songwriter, Co-Producer
- "SHREK 2" (DreamWorks), Song used in video game trailer/ad – Songwriter, Producer, Guitarist, Vocals
- "TONIGHT SHOW " (NBC), Music featured in series – Songwriter, Producer, Guitarist, Vocals
- "ANIMATION SHOW 4 " (Mike Judge), Music featured in film opener – Composer
- "ONE BAD TRIP" (MTV), Music featured in series – Songwriter, Producer, Guitarist, Vocals
- "PIMP MY RIDE" (MTV), Song featured in series- Songwriter, Producer, Guitarist, Vocals
- "MODERN MARVELS" (History), Music featured in series – Co-Composer, Co-Producer
- "MARIGOLD" (Paul Bickel Films), End credit song – Songwriter, Producer, Guitarist, Vocals
- "I'VE GOT A TATTOO", Music for Del Taco TV ad campaign – Composer, Co-Producer, Artist
- "FUNNIEST PETS & PEOPLE " (Super Station), Music featured in series – Co-Composer, Co-Producer
- "MOST HIGH" (2nd Act Films), Music featured in film – Songwriter, Producer, Guitarist, Vocals
