= Dokken discography =

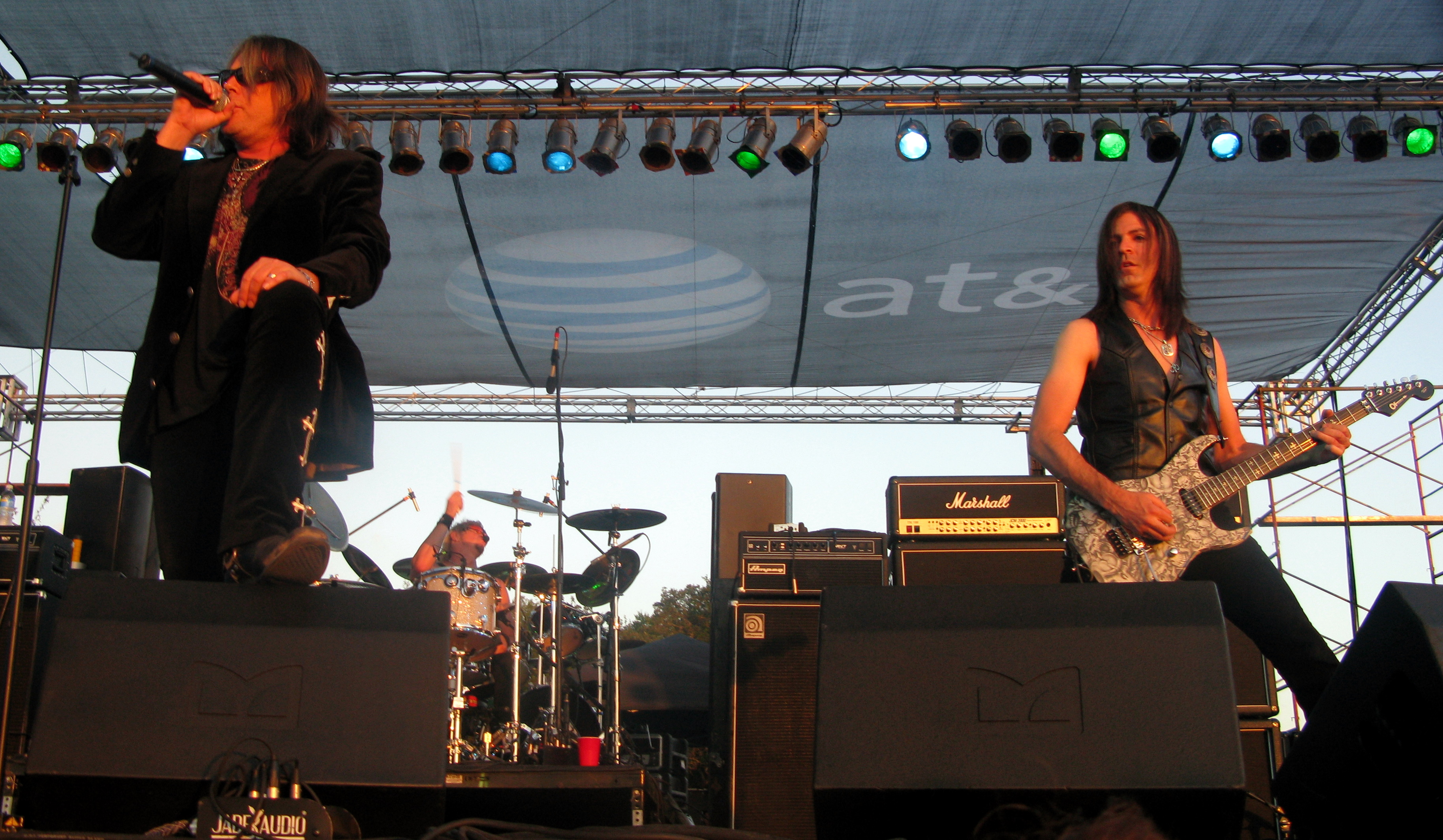
- Dokken performing in 2008
- Studio albums: 12
- Extended plays: 1
- Live albums: 6
- Compilation albums: 9
- Singles: 36

This is the complete discography of American rock band Dokken. Throughout their career, they have released 12 studio albums, 1 EP, 6 live albums, 9 compilation albums and 36 singles.

== Albums ==
=== Studio albums ===
Year	Album details	Peak chart positions				Certifications (sales threshold)
Year	Album details	US	SWE	SWI	UK	Certifications (sales threshold)
1981	Breaking the Chains: European release date: September 1981; Carrere Records; American release date: September 1983; Label: Elektra Records	136	—	—	—	
1984	Tooth and Nail: Release date: September 14, 1984; Label: Elektra Records	49	—	—	—	US: Platinum
1985	Under Lock and Key: Release date: November 22, 1985; Label: Elektra Records	32	—	—	—	US: Platinum
1987	Back for the Attack: Release date: November 2, 1987; Label: Elektra Records	13	19	25	96	US: Platinum
1995	Dysfunctional: Release date: May 23, 1995; Label: Columbia Records	47	—	—	—	
1997	Shadowlife: Release date: April 15, 1997; Label: CMC International	146	—	—	—	
1999	Erase the Slate: Release date: June 15, 1999; Label: CMC International	—	—	—	—	
2002	Long Way Home: Release date: April 23, 2002; Label: Sanctuary Records	—	—	—	—	
2004	Hell to Pay: Release date: July 13, 2004; Label: Sanctuary	—	—	—	—	
2008	Lightning Strikes Again: Release date: May 13, 2008; Label: Frontiers	133	—	—	—	
2012	Broken Bones: Release date: September 21, 2012; Label: Frontiers	173	—	—	—	
2023	Heaven Comes Down: Release date: October 27, 2023; Label: Silver Lining Music	—	—	20	—	

=== Live albums ===
Year	Album details	Peak chart positions		Certifications (sales threshold)
Year	Album details	US	SWE	Certifications (sales threshold)
1988	Beast from the East: Release date: November 7, 1988; Label: Elektra Records	33	47	US: Gold
1996	One Live Night: Release date: November 12, 1996; Label: CMC International	—	—	
2000	Live from the Sun: Release date: April 18, 2000; Label: CMC International	—	—	
2003	Japan Live '95: Release date: 2003; Label: Sanctuary Records	—	—	
2007	From Conception: Live 1981: Release date: March 13, 2007; Label: Rhino Records	—	—	
2018	Return to the East Live (2016): Release date: April 20, 2018; Label: King Records (Japan), Frontiers Records (rest of world)	—	—	
"—" denotes releases that did not chart

=== Compilation albums ===
Year	Album details
1994	The Best of Dokken: Release date: 1994; Label: Elektra Japan
1999	The Very Best of Dokken: Release date: July 6, 1999; Label: Elektra Records
2002	Then and Now: Release date: 2002; Label: Sanctuary Records
2002	Alone Again and Other Hits: Release date: 2002; Label: Flashback Records
2004	Change the World: An Introduction: Release date: 2004; Label: Sanctuary Records UK
2006	The Definitive Rock Collection: Release date: 2006; Label: Elektra/Warner Music Group
2010	Greatest Hits: Release date: May 4, 2010; Label: Cleopatra Records
2018	An Introduction to: Dokken: Release date: October 5, 2018; Label: Rhino Entertainment
2020	The Lost Songs: 1978 - 1981: Release date: August 28, 2020; Label: Silver Lining Music

=== Extended plays ===
Year	Album details
1979	Back in the Streets: Release date: 1979; Label: Repertoire Records

== Singles ==
Year	Single	Peak positions			Album
Year	Single	US	US Main	UK	Album
1979	"Hard Rock Woman"	—	—	—	Non-album single
1981	"I Can't See You"	—	—	—	Breaking the Chains
1981	"Young Girls"	—	—	—	Breaking the Chains
1982	"We're Illegal"	—	—	—	Breaking the Chains
1983	"Breaking the Chains"	—	32	—	Breaking the Chains
1984	"Into the Fire"	—	21	—	Tooth and Nail
1984	"Just Got Lucky"	105	27	—	Tooth and Nail
1985	"Alone Again"	64	20	—	Tooth and Nail
1985	"The Hunter"	—	25	—	Under Lock and Key
1986	"In My Dreams"	77	24	—	Under Lock and Key
1986	"It's Not Love"	—	—	—	Under Lock and Key
1987	"Dream Warriors"	—	22	—	Back for the Attack
1987	"Burning Like a Flame"	72	20	78	Back for the Attack
1988	"Prisoner" [US promo]	—	37	—	Back for the Attack
1988	"Heaven Sent"	—	—	—	Back for the Attack
1988	"So Many Tears"	—	—	—	Back for the Attack
1988	"Alone Again"	—	—	—	Beast from the East
1989	"Walk Away"	—	48	—	Beast from the East
1995	"Too High to Fly" [US promo]	—	29	—	Dysfunctional
2023	"Fugitive"	—	—	—	Heaven Comes Down
2023	"Gypsy"	—	—	—	Heaven Comes Down
"—" denotes releases that did not chart

== Music videos ==
- "Breaking the Chains" (1983)
- "Just Got Lucky" (1984)
- "Into the Fire" (1984)
- "Alone Again" (1984)
- "The Hunter" (1985)
- "In My Dreams" (1985)
- "It's Not Love" (1985)
- "Heaven Sent" (1987)
- "Burning Like a Flame" (1987)
- "Dream Warriors" (1987)
- "Walk Away" (1989)
- "Empire" (2012)
- "Step into Light" (2020)
- "Fugitive" (2023)
- "Gypsy" (2023)
- "Over the Mountain" (2023)
