= The Very Best of Dokken =

Greatest hits album by Dokken
- Released: July 6, 1999
- Recorded: 1983–1995
- Genre: Heavy metal, glam metal
- Length: 75:25
- Label: Elektra / Rhino

Dokken chronology
Erase the Slate (1999)	The Very Best of Dokken (1999)	Live from the Sun (2000)

Professional ratings
Review scores
Source	Rating
AllMusic	4.5/5 stars

The Very Best of Dokken is a greatest hits album by the American heavy metal band Dokken. Released on Rhino Records, this compilation contains most of Dokken's singles prior to 1995, the year this compilation was released. This compilation is a 16-song compilation arranged in chronological order. Tracks include the instrumental "Mr. Scary"; "Walk Away", the sole studio cut on the 1988 live album, Beast from the East; "Mirror Mirror", from Don Dokken's 1990 solo album, Up from the Ashes; and "Too High to Fly", from the 1995 reunion album, Dysfunctional.

== Track listing ==
No.	Title	Length
1.	"Breaking the Chains"	3:52
2.	"Paris Is Burning" (live in Europe, 1982)	5:09
3.	"Into the Fire"	4:27
4.	"Just Got Lucky"	4:36
5.	"Alone Again"	4:22
6.	"Tooth and Nail"	3:42
7.	"The Hunter"	4:08
8.	"In My Dreams"	4:20
9.	"It's Not Love"	5:00
10.	"Dream Warriors"	4:48
11.	"Burning Like a Flame"	4:46
12.	"Heaven Sent"	4:53
13.	"Mr. Scary"	4:30
14.	"Walk Away"	5:02
15.	"Mirror Mirror" (Don Dokken solo)	4:40
16.	"Too High to Fly"	7:10
