= Live from the Sun =

Album by American heavy metal band Dokken

Live album by Dokken
- Released: April 18, 2000
- Recorded: November 4, 1999
- Venue: Sun Theater, Anaheim, Orange County, California, United States
- Genre: Heavy metal
- Length: 73:07
- Label: CMC International; SPV/Steamhammer (Europe)
- Producer: Tom Fletcher and Dokken

Dokken chronology
The Very Best of Dokken (1999)	Live from the Sun (2000)	Long Way Home (2002)

Live from the Sun

Video by Dokken
- Released: November 21, 2000
- Recorded: November 4, 1999
- Venue: Sun Theater, Anaheim, California
- Genre: Heavy metal
- Length: 96 min.
- Label: CMC International
- Director: Tom Strickfaden
- Producer: Don Dokken

Dokken video albums chronology
One Live Night (1996)	Live from the Sun (2000)	Japan Live '95 (2003)

Professional ratings
Review scores
Source	Rating
AllMusic	2/5 stars
AllMusic	(DVD)
Metal Hammer	5/10

Live from the Sun is a live album released on April 18, 2000 by American heavy metal band Dokken. The album captures a performance of the reunited Dokken, minus guitarist George Lynch, held at the Sun Theater in Anaheim, CA on November 4, 1999. The live set featured some of their most popular songs, including two from the then-recently released Erase the Slate album. A video of the performance was also released both on VHS and DVD formats.

== Track listing ==
1. "Erase the Slate" - 4:21
2. "Kiss of Death" - 5:22
3. "The Hunter" - 3:57
4. "Into the Fire" - 5:38
5. "Maddest Hatter" - 5:00
6. "Too High to Fly" - 13:50
7. "Breaking the Chains" - 4:07
8. "Paris Is Burning"* - 4:06
9. "Alone Again" - 6:50
10. "It's Not Love" - 9:11
11. "Tooth and Nail" - 4:39
12. "In My Dreams" - 6:14
- *CD Bonus track on Japanese version of the album.

== Personnel ==
=== Dokken ===
- Don Dokken - vocals
- Reb Beach - guitar, backing vocals
- Jeff Pilson - bass, bass pedals, backing vocals
- Mick Brown - drums, backing vocals

=== Production ===
- Tom Fletcher - producer, engineer, mixing
- Phil Soussan - Pro-Tools editing
