= Beast from the East =

Live album by Dokken
- Released: November 7, 1988
- Recorded: April 20–30, 1988, Tokyo, Japan
- Genre: Heavy metal; hard rock
- Length: 63:24 (CD version); 77:33 (original cassette & LP versions)
- Label: Elektra
- Producer: Dokken & Angelo Arcuri

Dokken chronology
Back for the Attack (1987)	Beast from the East (1988)	The Best of Dokken (1994)

Singles from Beast from the East
- 1. "Alone Again" Released: December 1988; 2. "Walk Away" Released: February 1989

Alternative cover

Professional ratings
Review scores
Source	Rating
AllMusic	4.5/5 stars
The Collector's Guide to Heavy Metal	6/10
Rolling Stone	1/5 stars

Beast from the East is a live album recorded by the American heavy metal band Dokken in Japan in April 1988, during tour in support of their album Back for the Attack. It was released on November 7, 1988. The album features live versions of the band's most popular songs from previous four studio albums and also includes a new studio track entitled "Walk Away". The song was accompanied with a music video, which featured members of the band performing atop the Santa Monica Mountains overlooking Topanga Canyon and the Pacific Ocean. The album earned the band their only Grammy Award nomination for the Best Metal Performance in 1990, losing to Metallica's "One".

== Background ==
Up to 1988, Dokken had released four studio albums, of which the last three were certified platinum. The band opened for Judas Priest, Aerosmith and several other bands, which eventually gained the band a spot on the Monsters of Rock Tour 1988 festival, where they played with Metallica, Scorpions, Kingdom Come and the headliner, Van Halen. They also recorded a song "Dream Warriors" for the movie A Nightmare on Elm Street 3: Dream Warriors. Prior to the Monsters of Rock fest, the band went on to tour in Japan, where they recorded several shows of the tour. Those recordings were released as their first live album called Beast from the East, with an additional new song called "Walk Away". While not as successful as the band's previous release, Back for the Attack, Beast from the East entered Billboard Top 40, achieving gold certificate. In 1990, it was nominated to the Grammy Award for Best Metal Performance, the only Dokken album to receive one. However, the band was involved in controversy when Chris Cornell of Soundgarden, who was in direct competition with Dokken in the "Metal" category stated, "I have no idea why they call Dokken metal and put them in the same category we're in." To date, Beast from the East is the last Dokken album to receive a certification by RIAA.

== US CD track listing ==
No.	Title	Writer(s)	Length
1.	"Unchain the Night"	Don Dokken, Mick Brown, George Lynch, Jeff Pilson	5:38
2.	"Tooth and Nail"	Brown, Lynch, Pilson	3:18
3.	"Dream Warriors"	Lynch, Pilson	4:09
4.	"Kiss of Death"	Dokken, Lynch, Pilson	5:21
5.	"When Heaven Comes Down"	Brown, Lynch, Pilson	3:44
6.	"Into the Fire"	Dokken, Lynch, Pilson	5:02
7.	"Mr. Scary"	Lynch, Pilson	8:23
8.	"Heaven Sent"	Dokken, Lynch, Pilson	5:12
9.	"It's Not Love"	Brown, Dokken, Lynch, Pilson	6:14
10.	"Alone Again"	Dokken, Pilson	5:34
11.	"Just Got Lucky"	Lynch, Pilson	5:02
12.	"Breaking the Chains"	Dokken, Lynch	3:55
13.	"In My Dreams"	Brown, Dokken, Lynch, Pilson	5:02
14.	"Walk Away"	Dokken, Lynch, Pilson	5:00

== Japan & original U.S. cassette & LP version track listing ==
=== Sides 1–2 ===
No.	Title	Writer(s)	Length
1.	"Unchain the Night"	Brown, Dokken, Lynch, Pilson	5:38
2.	"Tooth and Nail"	Brown, Lynch, Pilson	3:18
3.	"Standing in the Shadows"	Dokken, Lynch, Pilson	4:27
4.	"Sleepless Night"	Lynch, Brown, Pilson	4:08
5.	"Dream Warriors"	Lynch, Pilson	4:09
6.	"Kiss of Death"	Dokken, Lynch, Pilson	5:21
7.	"When Heaven Comes Down"	Brown, Lynch, Pilson	3:44
8.	"Into the Fire"	Dokken, Lynch, Pilson	5:02
9.	"Mr. Scary"	Lynch, Pilson	8:13

=== Sides 3–4 ===
No.	Title	Writer(s)	Length
1.	"Heaven Sent"	Dokken, Lynch, Pilson	5:12
2.	"It's Not Love"	Brown, Dokken, Lynch, Pilson	6:14
3.	"Alone Again"	Dokken, Pilson	5:34
4.	"Just Got Lucky"	Lynch, Pilson	5:02
5.	"Breaking the Chains"	Brown, Dokken, Lynch	3:55
6.	"In My Dreams"	Brown, Dokken, Lynch, Pilson	5:02
7.	"Turn on the Action"	Brown, Lynch, Pilson	4:58
8.	"Walk Away"	Dokken, Lynch, Pilson	5:00

== Personnel ==
- Don Dokken - lead vocals
- George Lynch - lead guitar
- Jeff Pilson - bass guitar, keyboards, backing vocals
- Mick Brown - drums, backing vocals

== Charts ==
Chart (1988)	Peak position
Japanese Albums (Oricon)	25
Swedish Albums (Sverigetopplistan)	47
US Billboard 200	33

== Sales and recognition ==
Region	Certification	Certified units/sales
United States (RIAA)	Gold	500,000^{^}
^{^} Shipments figures based on certification alone.

Year	Nominee / work	Award	Result
1990	Beast from the East	Best Metal Performance	Nominated
