= One Live Night =

1996 semi-acoustic live album by Dokken

Live album by Dokken
- Released: 1995 (Japan); November 12, 1996 (US)
- Recorded: December 13, 1994
- Venue: The Strand, Redondo Beach, California
- Genre: Acoustic rock
- Length: 61:57
- Label: CMC International; Victor (Japan)
- Producer: Dokken and Wyn Davis

Dokken chronology
Dysfunctional (1995)	One Live Night (1995)	Shadowlife (1997)

One Live Night

Video by Dokken
- Released: November 12, 1996
- Recorded: December 12, 1994
- Venue: The Strand, Redondo Beach, California
- Genre: Acoustic rock
- Length: 80 min.
- Label: CMC International
- Director: Tom Strickfaden
- Producer: Dokken and Wyn Davis

Dokken video albums chronology
Unchain the Night (1986)	One Live Night (1996)	Live from the Sun (2000)

Professional ratings
Review scores
Source	Rating
AllMusic	2.5/5 stars
Collector's Guide to Heavy Metal	6/10
AllMusic	(DVD)

One Live Night is a 1996 semi-acoustic live album by heavy metal band Dokken. The reunited Dokken recorded the album before a live audience at The Strand, an intimate concert venue in Redondo Beach, California, on December 13, 1994, and prior to their 1995 tour. The album went virtually unheard at the time of its release. Released at the time when grunge and alternative rock were dominating mainstream rock music, MTV had no interest in featuring glam metal acts; so Dokken decided to do their own "unplugged" album. This intimate performance included versions of "Tooth and Nail", "Into the Fire" and "Alone Again", as well as covers of the Beatles' "Nowhere Man" and Emerson, Lake & Palmer's "From the Beginning".

One Live Night was also released on VHS and later DVD.

== Track listing ==
1. "Into the Fire" – 5:22
2. "Unchain the Night" – 6:48
3. "The Maze" – 5:44
4. "Nothing Left to Say" – 4:44
5. "From the Beginning" (Emerson, Lake & Palmer cover) – 4:59
6. "Tooth and Nail" – 4:43
7. "Just Got Lucky" – 5:07
8. "I Will Remember" – 4:16
9. "Alone Again" – 7:20
10. "In My Dreams" – 4:34
11. "Nowhere Man" (The Beatles cover) – 2:55
12. "It's Not Love" – 6:03

== Personnel ==
=== Dokken ===
- Don Dokken - vocals, acoustic guitar, slide guitar, acoustic bass guitar
- George Lynch - electric and acoustic guitar, 12-string acoustic guitar
- Jeff Pilson - acoustic bass guitar, acoustic guitar, piano, vocals
- Mick Brown - percussion, vocals

=== Production ===
- Wyn Davis - producer, engineer, mixing at Total Access Recording, Redondo Beach, California

== Charts ==
Chart (1995)	Peak position
Japanese Albums (Oricon)	35
