= Back in the Streets =

EP by Dokken
- Released: 1979
- Recorded: October 1979
- Studios: Tennessee Studios, Hamburg, West Germany; Sounds Music Club, October 1979 (live recording)
- Genres: Hard rock; heavy metal
- Length: 25:06
- Label: Repertoire Records
- Producers: Michael Wagener; Dokken

Dokken chronology
Back in the Streets (1979)	Breaking the Chains (1981)

Professional ratings
Review scores
Source	Rating
AllMusic	3/5 stars

Back in the Streets is a 1989 EP by the American heavy metal band Dokken, recorded in 1979 during the band's tour of Germany.

According to band founder/singer Don Dokken, Back in the Streets was a demo tape that was stolen from him. It is an illegal bootleg for which the band sees no royalties or financial remuneration. Since it is a bootleg release, Don Dokken has reportedly stated that it is acceptable to duplicate this material. Dokken's rationale is that releasing the material to the public domain will severely curb the ability of the bootleggers to profit financially. The record was released in 1989 on the German Repertoire label.

Of the members of Dokken associated with the major label releases from 1983 onward, only Don plays on this album. The band photo includes drummer Gary Holland (later of Great White) at far left, and guitarist Greg Leon second from the left, both former members of the band Suite 19. At far right is bassist Gary Link. These were the musicians that backed Don Dokken on his tour of Germany in 1980.

The Back in the Streets EP tracks are also included on the 2020 Dokken archives release, The Lost Songs: 1978-1981.

== Track listing ==
Side one: Studio side
No.	Title	Writer(s)	Length
1.	"Back in the Streets"	Don Dokken, George Lynch	3:15
2.	"Felony"	Dokken, Lynch, Mick Brown	2:45
3.	"Day After Day"	Dokken, Lynch	5:35
4.	"We're Going Wrong"	Dokken, Lynch	3:35

Side two: Live side
No.	Title	Writer(s)	Length
1.	"Liar" (live)	Dokken	3:45
2.	"Prisoner" (live)	Dokken, Jeff Pilson, Brown	6:05

== Personnel ==
=== Dokken ===
- Don Dokken – lead vocals, rhythm guitar
- George Lynch – lead guitar
- Juan Croucier – bass, background vocals
- Mick Brown – drums

=== Production ===
- Michael Wagener – producer, engineer
