= Tooth and Nail =

Tooth and Nail may refer to:

== Music ==
- Tooth & Nail (Billy Bragg album), 2013
- Tooth and Nail (Dokken album) or the title song, 1984
- Tooth and Nail (various artists album), featuring California punk bands, 1979
- Tooth & Nail Records, an American record label
- T&N, originally Tooth and Nail, an American rock band
- "Tooth and Nail", a song by Foreigner from Agent Provocateur, 1984

== Other uses ==
- Tooth and Nail (film), a 2007 horror film
- Tooth and Nail (novel), a 1992 novel by Ian Rankin
- Tooth and nail syndrome, a medical disorder

== See also ==
- The Tooth and the Nail, a 2017 South Korean film
