= Breaking the Chains =

Breaking the Chains may refer to:

- Breaking the Chains (album), a 1983 album by American glam metal band Dokken
- "Breaking the Chains" (song), a 1982 single by Dokken
- "Breaking the Chains", a song from the 1981 album Recovery by Runrig
- Breaking the Chains (Pegazus album), a 2000 album by Australian heavy metal band Pegazus
