= From the Beginning (song) =

1972 single by Emerson, Lake and Palmer

Single by Emerson, Lake & Palmer

from the album Trilogy
- B-side: "Living Sin"
- Released: August 1972
- Genre: Art rock, progressive rock, folk rock, psychedelic rock
- Length: 3:48 (single version); 4:14 (album version)
- Label: Cotillion
- Songwriter: Greg Lake
- Producer: Greg Lake

Emerson, Lake & Palmer singles chronology
| "Nut Rocker" (1971) | "From the Beginning" (1972) | "Hoedown" (1972) |

"From the Beginning" is a song written by Greg Lake and performed by the progressive rock trio Emerson, Lake & Palmer. It was released on their 1972 album Trilogy. It hit #39 in the United States and was their highest-charting single there.

== Composition ==
The song was written in the key of A minor. It is driven by an acoustic guitar line with layers of electric guitar (both rhythm and lead), electric bass guitar, and sung by Lake, with some backing on drums (played by Carl Palmer with congas, tympani mallets and without cymbals), and with a distinctive closing synthesizer solo from Keith Emerson, accompanied by overdubbed synthesizer sounds. This song was originally intended for King Crimson's debut album In the Court of the Crimson King, but band leader Robert Fripp didn't think it would fit into the album's context.

Record World said that "Greg Lake gets a great sound out of his band on this acoustically jazzy number that highlights his voice and fine lyrics."

== Personnel ==
- Keith Emerson - Moog synthesizer
- Greg Lake - vocals, acoustic guitar, electric guitar, electric bass
- Carl Palmer - drums, percussion

== Charts ==
| Chart (1972) | Peak position |
|---|---|
| Canada Top Singles (RPM) | 34 |
| New Zealand (Listener) | 7 |
| US Billboard Hot 100 | 39 |
| US Cashbox Top Singles | 40 |

== Cover versions ==
- Marsyas covered the song in Czech under the name "Studená koupel" in their 1982 album, Kousek přízně.
- Dokken covered the song in their 1995 album, Dysfunctional.
- The song was sampled by singer Amerie on the track "Got To Be There" from her debut 2002 album, All I Have with Greg Lake receiving a songwriting credit.
