= T&N =

American rock band

- Also known as: Tooth and Nail
- Genres: Hard rock, heavy metal
- Years active: 2011–2012
- Spinoff of: Dokken
- Members: Jeff Pilson; George Lynch; Brian Tichy; Mick Brown

T&N (previously Tooth and Nail) is an American hard rock band formed in 2011 by then-current and former members of Dokken.

== History ==
The band, originally named Tooth and Nail, was forced to change their name in March 2012 due to legal concerns, as the name was already trademarked.

The band announced on December 15, 2011, that they were in the process of recording an album consisting of both original material and Dokken covers, due to be released October 31, 2012. The working title according to Lynch was "Dump the Chump" in a 2012 interview. In September 2012, the album's title was announced as Slave to the Empire, to be released on October 31 by Rat Pak Records.

In support of Slave to the Empire, T&N went on tour in late 2012, playing shows in the United States, eastern Asia and Europe between October and December. According to Lynch, the band has recorded music for another album, though the release date is undetermined. In June 2019, Brown announced his retirement.

== Members ==
- Jeff Pilson – lead and backing vocals, bass guitars, keyboards, acoustic guitar (2011–2012)
- George Lynch – lead and rhythm guitars, backing vocals (2011–2012)
- Brian Tichy – drums (2011–2012)
- Mick Brown – drums, percussion, backing vocals (2011–2012)

== Discography ==
- 2012: Slave to the Empire
