= Long Way Home (Dokken album) =

Studio album by Dokken
- Released: April 23, 2002; June 21, 2002 (Japan)
- Recorded: 2001–2002
- Studio: Total Access Recording, Redondo Beach, California, Cornerstone Studios, Chatsworth, California
- Genre: Hard rock, heavy metal
- Length: 50:06
- Label: CMC International (US); Sanctuary (Europe); Universal (Japan)
- Producer: Don Dokken

Dokken chronology
Live from the Sun (2000)	Long Way Home (2002)	Japan Live '95 (2003)

Professional ratings
Review scores
Source	Rating
AllMusic	1.5/5 stars

Long Way Home is the eighth studio album by American heavy metal band Dokken, released in the spring of 2002. It is the only Dokken album which features Europe guitarist John Norum and the first featuring bassist Barry Sparks.

One of the songs on the album, "Heart Full of Soul", is a cover version of the 1965 single by The Yardbirds. The song was written by Graham Gouldman of the band 10cc.

As of 2011, Long Way Home has sold 410,000 copies worldwide.

Alternate versions of the album cover featured a special lighting effect around the body of the model.

== Track listing ==
No.	Title	Writer(s)	Length
1.	"Sunless Days"	Don Dokken, John Norum, Kelly Keeling	4:20
2.	"Little Girl"	Dokken, Keeling, Mick Brown	3:44
3.	"Everybody Needs (To Be with Someone)"	Dokken, Brown	3:15
4.	"You"	Dokken, Norum, Keeling	3:47
5.	"Goodbye My Friend"	Dokken	4:05
6.	"Magic Road"	Dokken, Norum	3:31
7.	"There Was a Time"	Dokken, Keeling	3:52
8.	"Heart Full of Soul" (The Yardbirds cover)	Graham Gouldman	2:28
9.	"Under the Gun"	Dokken, Norum, Keeling	4:23
10.	"I've Found"	Dokken, Keeling	3:43

Japanese edition bonus tracks
No.	Title	Length
11.	"Dancin' (The Irish Song)"	5:03
12.	"Only Heaven Knows"	3:17
13.	"Let It Be True"	4:38

== Personnel ==
=== Dokken ===
- Don Dokken – lead and backing vocals, rhythm guitar, acoustic guitar, producer
- John Norum – lead guitar
- Barry Sparks – bass guitar, backing vocals
- Mick Brown – drums, backing vocals

=== Production ===
- Wyn Davis, Mike McMullen, Brian Daugherty, Mike Lesniak – engineers
- Michael Wagener – mixing at WireWorld Studio, Nashville, Tennessee
- Eric Conn – mastering

== Charts ==
Chart (2002)	Peak position
Japanese Albums (Oricon)	69
