= Barry Sparks =

American bassist

- Born: June 20, 1968 (age 58); Lucasville, Ohio, U.S.
- Genres: Glam metal; hard rock; heavy metal
- Occupation: Musician
- Instruments: Bass; vocals; guitar
- Years active: 1991–present

Barry Sparks (born June 20, 1968) is an American rock bassist and guitarist for artists such as Yngwie Malmsteen, the Michael Schenker Group, UFO, Dokken, and Ted Nugent, among others. Until 2019, Sparks was part of the touring band for the Japanese rock duo B'z, and has also contributed to many of their albums and singles.

== History ==
Barry Sparks first began to make a name for himself as the bass player for former MCA recording artist Guy Mann-Dude with whom he toured and recorded the 1991 Mannic Distortion release. This led to Sparks landing the bass gig with Swedish guitarist Yngwie Malmsteen in time for The Seventh Sign tour in 1994, followed by a four-year on-and-off stint with German guitarist Michael Schenker, starting with the 1996 Written in the Sand album.

In 1997, Sparks and Michael Schenker Group drummer Shane Gaalaas teamed up with guitarist Jeff Kollman to form the all-instrumental fusion trio Cosmosquad with whom Sparks recorded three albums before exiting. The trio also backed vocalist John West on his 1998 sophomore release, Permanent Mark. In 1998, Sparks became a touring musician with pop singer Billie Myers of "Kiss the Rain" fame, doing television and radio station appearances and playing worldwide, including Good Morning America and Top of the Pops in England. They also supported tours with Bob Dylan in Europe, Savage Garden and many others.

In the late 1990s Sparks guested on albums by former Loudness vocalist Michael Vescera and then Helloween guitarist Roland Grapow, toured with future UFO bandmate Vinnie Moore, and recorded and toured with ex-Scorpions guitarist Uli Jon Roth.

In 2001, Sparks released his acoustic guitar based solo debut album, Glimmer of Hope, on his own Moonbeam Music label. A second album, Can't Look Back, with special guest appearances by ZZ Top's Billy Gibbons (on "Breathe") and Ted Nugent (on "Liberty"), followed in 2004. Sparks began working with Nugent on the "Beer Drinkers & Hell Raisers" U.S. summer tour of 2003.

In 2001, Sparks became the bass player for Dokken, an affiliation that lasted until 2010 and produced four studio albums. During this time, Sparks and Dokken drummer Mick Brown also played with Ted Nugent, documented on the 2008 live release Sweden Rocks.

In 2004, Sparks was called to record bass tracks for the Scorpions' Unbreakable album. That same year, Sparks filled in for one of his all-time bass heroes, Pete Way of UFO, on the You Are Here U.S. tour. He last toured with the group in 2011.

After previously touring with the band in 2003 for their Big Machine album, Sparks was again recruited by the Japanese rock duo B'z for their 2008 "Glory Days" tour, re-teaming with his former Yngwie Malmsteen, MSG and Cosmosquad rhythm partner, drummer Shane Gaalaas. He remained a touring member through 2019, during which he also recorded many albums and singles with the band.

In 2013, Sparks re-connected with his former Yngwie Malmsteen band mate, vocalist Mike Vescera, in Riot On Mars. The project released their debut album, First Wave, on Zain Records in Japan in 2015. Guest musicians on the album include drummers BJ Zampa and Shane Gaalaas as well as vocalist Dan McCafferty of Nazareth fame who contributes vocals on a cover of the Nazareth song, "Beggars Day".

== Select Discography ==
=== Solo ===
- Glimmer of Hope (2001)
- Can't Look Back (2004)
- Bass In Your Face (2018)

=== with Leatherwolf ===
- Kill The Hunted (2022)

=== with Mother Road ===
- Mother Road II (2021)

=== with Riot On Mars ===
- First Wave (2015)

=== with B'z ===
- B'z Live-Gym Pleasure 2008: Glory Days (Live DVD) (2009)
- Magic (2009)
- B'z Live-Gym 2010 Ain't No Magic (Live DVD) (2010)
- C'mon (2011)
- B'z Live-Gym 2011 C'mon (Live DVD) (2012)
- "Into Free -Dangan-" (2012)
- B'z (2012)
- B'z Live Gym 2008 "Action" (Live DVD) (2013)
- B'z The Best XXV 1988–1998 (Bonus tracks) (2013)
- B'z The Best XXV 1999–2012 (2013)
- Epic Day (2015)
- Dinosaur (2017)
- New Love (on "Tsuwamono, Hashiru") (2019)

=== with Ted Nugent ===
- Love Grenade (2007)
- Sweden Rocks (2008)

=== with Scorpions ===
- Unbreakable (on tracks 2 and 4) (2004)

=== with Dokken ===
- Long Way Home (2002)
- Hell To Pay (2004)
- Lightning Strikes Again (2008)
- Greatest Hits (2010)

=== with Tony MacAlpine ===
- Chromaticity (2001)
- Collection: The Shrapnel Years (2006)

=== with Uli Jon Roth ===
- Transcendental Sky Guitar (2000)
- Legends of Rock: Live at Castle Donington (2002)

=== with Vinnie Moore ===
- Live! (1999)
- Collection: The Shrapnel Years (2006)

=== with Roland Grapow ===
- Kaleidoscope (1999)

=== with Jeff Kollman ===
- Shedding Skin (1999)

=== with MVP (Mike Vescera Project) ===
- Windows (1997)

=== with John West ===
- Mind Journey (1997)
- Permanent Mark (1998)

=== with Cosmosquad ===
- Cosmosquad (1997)
- Squadrophenia (2001)
- Live at the Baked Potato (2002)
- Best of Cosmosquad (2003)

=== with Miloš Dodo Doležal ===
- Dodo hraje Hendrixe (1997)

=== with Michael Schenker Group ===
- Written in the Sand (1996)
- The Michael Schenker Story Live (1997)
- The Unforgiven World Tour (2000)
- Live in Tokyo 1997 (2000)
- Dreams and Expressions (2000)
- Immortal (2021)
- Universal (2022)

=== with Yngwie Malmsteen ===
- I Can't Wait (1994)
- Magnum Opus (1995)

=== with Guy Mann-Dude ===
- Mannic Distortion (1991)
