= Dysfunctional (Dokken album) =

Studio album by Dokken
- Released: May 16, 1995
- Recorded: 1994–1995
- Studio: At 710 Studios and Total Access Recording, Redondo Beach, California
- Genre: Hard rock
- Length: 54:22
- Label: Columbia
- Producer: Don Dokken, Michael Wagener

Dokken chronology
The Best of Dokken (1994)	Dysfunctional (1995)	One Live Night (1995)

Professional ratings
Review scores
Source	Rating
AllMusic	2/5 stars
Collector's Guide to Heavy Metal	8/10

Dysfunctional is the fifth studio album by American heavy metal band Dokken, released in 1995. It was the band's first release after reuniting in 1993.

Originally intended to be a Don Dokken solo album, it morphed into a Dokken album when guitarist George Lynch was brought back into the fold, with Jeff Pilson and Mick Brown already on board. The original album was produced for the Japanese market and released there in December 1994 on JVC/Victor, simply titled Dokken. When Sony Music signed the band to the label internationally, the album was remixed and three additional songs recorded, "Hole In My Head", a cover of Emerson, Lake & Palmer's "From the Beginning", and "If the Good Die Young" (the bonus track on the Japanese version). This last song is a heavily re-worked new version of the song "Snake Eyes", which Jeff Pilson had recorded with his post-Dokken band, Flesh & Blood (eventually re-named War & Peace). "Snake Eyes" was finally released as part of the War & Peace – The Flesh and Blood Sessions album in 1999.

Although Dysfunctional entered the chart respectably at No. 47 at a time when 1980s hard rock and heavy metal had largely declined, sales quickly dropped off and were not enough to reach gold RIAA certification. In a later interview, Don Dokken claimed that the album had sold 400,000 copies .

The song "Too High to Fly" was released as a promo single from the album and was a minor hit. It is one of the post 80s Dokken songs that is played live on a consistent basis.

== Track listing ==
No.	Title	Writer(s)	Length
1.	"Inside Looking Out"	Don Dokken, Jeff Pilson	4:08
2.	"Hole in My Head"	Dokken, Pilson, Mick Brown	4:33
3.	"The Maze"	Dokken, Pilson, George Lynch	4:50
4.	"Too High to Fly"	Dokken, Lynch	7:10
5.	"Nothing Left to Say"	Dokken, Pilson	4:30
6.	"Shadows of Life"	Dokken, Pilson	4:33
7.	"Long Way Home"	Dokken, Pilson, Lynch	5:12
8.	"Sweet Chains"	Dokken	5:46
9.	"Lesser of Two Evils"	Dokken, Pilson, Lynch	4:03
10.	"What Price"	Dokken, Brown, Pilson	5:45
11.	"From the Beginning" (Emerson, Lake & Palmer cover)	Greg Lake	4:12

Japanese bonus track
No.	Title	Writer(s)	Length
12.	"When the Good Die Young"	Dokken, Pilson	4:55

== Personnel ==
=== Dokken ===
- Don Dokken – vocals, producer
- George Lynch – lead and rhythm guitars
- Jeff Pilson – bass guitar
- Mick Brown – drums

=== Production ===
- Michael Wagener – producer, engineer, mixing on tracks 5, 8–10
- Wyn Davis – engineer, mixing
- Darian Rundall, Don Dokken, Kenny Oswald – engineers
- George Marino – mastering at Sterling Sound, New York
- John Keane – orchestral arrangements on track 5
- John Kalodner – A&R

== Charts ==
Chart (1995)	Peak position
US Billboard 200	47
