= Shadowlife =

Studio album by Dokken
- Released: April 15, 1997
- Recorded: 1996–97
- Studio: Vintage Recorders, Phoenix, Arizona; 710 Studios, Redondo Beach, California; Albacore Studios, Cave Creek, Arizona
- Genre: Alternative rock
- Length: 52:03
- Label: CMC International; Victor (Japan)
- Producer: Kelly Gray

Dokken chronology
One Live Night (1995)	Shadowlife (1997)	Erase the Slate (1999)

Professional ratings
Review scores
Source	Rating
AllMusic	2.5/5 stars
Collector's Guide to Heavy Metal	7/10

Shadowlife is the sixth studio album by the American heavy metal band Dokken, released in 1997. It marks a change in the band's musical style, moving towards alternative rock. However, critics and fans alike were not pleased with the change, and dismiss the album as one of Dokken's weakest. It is also the last studio album with original lead guitarist George Lynch.

== Track listing ==
All tracks are written by Mick Brown, Don Dokken, Jeff Pilson, and George Lynch except "Here I Stand" and "I Don't Mind" which were co-written by Kelly Gray.

No.	Title	Length
1.	"Puppet on a String"	4:22
2.	"Cracks in the Ground"	5:01
3.	"Sky Beneath My Feet"	4:36
4.	"Until I Know"	2:18
5.	"Hello"	3:13
6.	"Convenience Store Messiah"	4:28
7.	"I Feel"	4:24
8.	"Here I Stand"	4:43
9.	"Hard to Believe"	4:29
10.	"Sweet Life"	4:23
11.	"Bitter Regret"	3:59
12.	"I Don't Mind"	3:18
13.	"Until I Know (Slight Return)"	2:41

Japanese bonus tracks
No.	Title	Length
14.	"How Many Lives"	4:48
15.	"Deep Waters"	6:06

- Tracks 14 and 15 are bonus tracks on the Japanese release (VICP-5839).

== Personnel ==
=== Dokken ===
- Don Dokken - vocals
- George Lynch - lead and rhythm guitars
- Jeff Pilson - bass guitar, lead vocals on "Here I Stand"
- Mick Brown - drums

=== Production ===
- Kelly Gray - producer, engineer, mixing
- Aaron Carey - mixing assistant
- Eddy Schreyer, Gene Grimaldi - mastering

== Charts ==
Chart (1997)	Peak position
Japanese Albums (Oricon)	28
US Billboard 200	146
