= Hell to Pay (Dokken album) =

Studio album by Dokken
- Released: July 13, 2004
- Recorded: 2004
- Studio: Total Access Recording, Redondo Beach, California
- Genre: Hard rock, heavy metal
- Length: 48:10
- Label: Sanctuary
- Producer: Don Dokken

Dokken chronology
Alone Again and Other Hits (2003)	Hell to Pay (2004)	Change the World: An Introduction (2004)

Professional ratings
Review scores
Source	Rating
AllMusic	2.5/5 stars
Imperiumi	6/10 stars
Imperiumi	7/10 stars

Hell to Pay is the ninth studio album by American heavy metal band Dokken, released in 2004. It was produced by Don Dokken himself and is also the first studio album to feature lead guitarist Jon Levin.

== Track listing ==
All tracks are written by Don Dokken, except where noted.

No.	Title	Writer(s)	Length
1.	"The Last Goodbye"	Don Dokken, Mick Brown, Jon Levin	4:37
2.	"Don't Bring Me Down"	Dokken, Barry Sparks, Levin	3:24
3.	"Escape"	Dokken, Brown, Jon Levin	4:37
4.	"Haunted"	Dokken, Brown, Jon Levin	3:39
5.	"Prozac Nation"	Kelly Keeling, Jon Levin	4:32
6.	"Care for You"	Keeling	4:11
7.	"Better Off Before"	Dokken, Brown, Jon Levin	3:00
8.	"Still I'm Sad"		4:37
9.	"I Surrender"		3:03
10.	"Letter to Home"	Keeling, Levin	4:28
11.	"Can You See"	Levin	4:09
12.	"Care for You" (unplugged)	Keeling	3:58

== Personnel ==
Dokken

- Don Dokken – vocals, producer
- Jon Levin – guitars
- Barry Sparks – bass guitar, backing vocals
- Mick Brown – drums, backing vocals

Production

- Wyn Davis – engineer, mixing
- Brian Daugherty – additional engineering, mixing on track 9
- Darian Rundall, Mike Lesniak, Don Dokken – additional engineering
- Eddy Schreyer – mastering at Oasis Mastering, Los Angeles
