= Back for the Attack =

Studio album by Dokken
- Released: November 2, 1987
- Recorded: December 1986, August 1987
- Studios: One on One, North Hollywood; Music Grinder, Hollywood; Total Access, Redondo Beach, California; Rumbo, Canoga Park, Los Angeles; Can-Am, Reseda, Los Angeles
- Genres: Glam metal; heavy metal; arena rock
- Length: 63:02
- Label: Elektra
- Producer: Neil Kernon

Dokken chronology
Under Lock and Key (1985)	Back for the Attack (1987)	Beast from the East (1988)

Singles from Back for the Attack
- 1. "Dream Warriors" Released: February 18, 1987; 2. "Burning Like a Flame" Released: December 1987; 3. "Heaven Sent" Released: March 25, 1988; 4. "So Many Tears" Released: June 1988

Back for the Attack is the fourth studio album by American heavy metal band Dokken, released on November 2, 1987, through Elektra Records.

Back for the Attack was certified Gold and Platinum on January 14, 1988. The album sold about 1.5 million records worldwide.

A remastered edition featuring a bonus track was reissued in 2009 through Warner Music Japan. It is the band's best-selling album, reaching No. 13 on the U.S. Billboard 200 and remaining on that chart for 33 weeks.

Three singles also charted on Billboard's Mainstream Rock chart: "Dream Warriors" reached No. 22, "Prisoner" at No. 37, and "Burning Like a Flame" at No. 20 as well as No. 72 on the Billboard Hot 100.

The single "Dream Warriors" was originally released in February 10, 1987, as the theme song for the horror film A Nightmare on Elm Street 3: Dream Warriors.

The album title for Back for the Attack was taken from an earlier Dokken song of the same name, recorded during the sessions for Under Lock and Key (1985) and released as the B-side to "Dream Warriors". It was later included in the 2009 remastered edition of the album as a bonus track.

== Critical reception ==
Professional ratings
Review scores
Source	Rating
AllMusic	3/5 stars
The Collector's Guide to Heavy Metal	8/10
Rock Hard	8.5/10

Barry Weber at AllMusic wrote that Back for the Attack "certainly isn't Dokken's greatest album, yet it remains a worthwhile listen". He praised the band for sounding "tighter than they ever have before", with frontman Don Dokken and guitarist George Lynch being "at the top of their game."

Canadian journalist Martin Popoff praised the album, which "offers length, variation and a sense of ambition as never before", and called it "one of those lost records brimming with bravado" but not so unique to be "one's life soundtrack". He added that the "excruciating" circumstances of its recording took their toll as the band tried to assemble "a more competent, mature, substantial record".

Paul Elliott at Classic Rock called it "arena rock with a heavy metal edge" and "an album filled with anthems", while remarking that "it was with this album that their glory days ended".

The album was ranked number 12 on Metal Rules list of the Top 50 Glam Metal Albums.

== Track listing ==
All Credits adapted from the original LP.

Side one
No.	Title	Writer(s)	Length
1.	"Kiss of Death"	George Lynch, Don Dokken, Jeff Pilson	5:51
2.	"Prisoner"	Lynch, Pilson, Mick Brown	4:20
3.	"Night by Night"	Pilson, Lynch, Brown, Dokken	5:23
4.	"Standing in the Shadows"	Dokken, Lynch, Pilson	5:07
5.	"Heaven Sent"	Dokken, Lynch, Pilson	4:52
6.	"Mr. Scary" (instrumental)	Lynch, Pilson	4:31

Side two
No.	Title	Writer(s)	Length
7.	"So Many Tears"	Dokken, Lynch, Pilson	4:56
8.	"Burning Like a Flame"	Lynch, Pilson, Dokken, Brown	4:46
9.	"Lost Behind the Wall"	Lynch, Brown, Dokken, Pilson	4:19
10.	"Stop Fighting Love"	Pilson, Lynch, Dokken, Brown	4:52
11.	"Cry of the Gypsy"	Dokken, Pilson, Lynch	4:51
12.	"Sleepless Night"	Lynch, Brown, Pilson	4:32
13.	"Dream Warriors"	Lynch, Pilson	4:42
Total length:			63:02

Remastered edition bonus track
No.	Title	Writer(s)	Length
14.	"Back for the Attack"	Dokken	3:51
Total length:			66:53

== Personnel ==
All credits adapted from the original LP.

=== Dokken ===
- Don Dokken – lead vocals
- George Lynch – guitar
- Jeff Pilson – bass, backing vocals
- Wild Mick – drums, backing vocals

=== Production ===
- Neil Kernon – producer, engineer
- Toby Wright, Matt Freeman, Eddie Ashworth, Andy Udoff, Steve Klein, Stan Katayama – assistant engineers
- Steve Thompson, Michael Barbiero – mixing at Bearsville Studios, Bearsville, New York
- Bob Ludwig – mastering at Masterdisk, New York

== Charts ==
Chart (1987–88)	Peak position
Canada Top Albums/CDs (RPM)	25
Finnish Albums (The Official Finnish Charts)	18
Japanese Albums (Oricon)	21
Swedish Albums (Sverigetopplistan)	19
Swiss Albums (Schweizer Hitparade)	25
UK Albums (Official Charts)	96
US Billboard 200	13

== Certifications ==
Region	Certification	Certified units/sales
United States (RIAA)	Platinum	1,000,000^{^}
^{^} Shipments figures based on certification alone.
