= Heaven Comes Down =

Studio album by Dokken
- Released: October 27, 2023
- Recorded: 2023
- Studios: Bill Palmer Recording, Santa Fe, New Mexico
- Genres: Hard rock, glam metal, heavy metal
- Length: 41:53
- Label: Silver Lining Music
- Producers: Don Dokken, Bill Palmer

Dokken chronology
The Lost Songs: 1978–1981 (2020)	Heaven Comes Down (2023)

Singles from Heaven Comes Down
- 1. "Fugitive" Released: August 8, 2023; 2. "Gypsy" Released: September 19, 2023; 3. "Over the Mountain" Released: October 25, 2023

Heaven Comes Down is the twelfth studio album by American heavy metal band Dokken. It was released on October 27, 2023, through Silver Lining Music. The album marked the band's first studio release in eleven years, following Broken Bones (2012).

The album was produced by Don Dokken and Bill Palmer, with mixing handled by Kevin Shirley. Heaven Comes Down features a blend of classic Dokken hard rock elements.

== Background and recording ==
Following a lengthy hiatus between studio albums, Dokken began work on new material in 2022. Recording sessions took place at Bill Palmer’s studio in Santa Fe, New Mexico.

== Release and promotion ==
The album was announced in August 2023, alongside the release of the lead single "Fugitive". A music video for the song was filmed at Meow Wolf in Santa Fe and directed by Chris Eyre.

Additional music videos were released for "Gypsy", "Over the Mountain", and "Saving Grace" in support of the album. Heaven Comes Down was released worldwide on CD, vinyl, and digital formats.

== Critical reception ==
Heaven Comes Down received mixed reviews from critics. Praise was directed toward Jon Levin's guitar work and the album's melodic composition, while some criticism focused on Don Dokken's vocal performance. The reviewer of Norway Rock Magazine also thought the vocals sounded contrived, and that Heaven Comes Down should have been a Don Dokken solo release rather than a Dokken release which was "completely wrong and respectless". The rating was 3 out of 6 points.

== Track listing ==
All tracks are written by Don Dokken and Jon Levin, except where indicated.

No.	Title	Writer(s)	Length
1.	"Fugitive"	Dokken	3:56
2.	"Gypsy"		4:19
3.	"Is It Me or You?"		4:22
4.	"Just Like a Rose"		4:19
5.	"I'll Never Give Up"		4:27
6.	"Saving Grace"		4:15
7.	"Over the Mountain"		3:51
8.	"I Remember"		3:47
9.	"Lost in You"		4:10
10.	"Santa Fe"	Dokken	4:24

== Personnel ==
Credits adapted from the album's liner notes.

Dokken

- Don Dokken – lead vocals, producer
- Jon Levin – guitar
- Chris McCarvill – bass, album artwork
- BJ Zampa – drums

Production

- Bill Palmer – producer
- Kevin Shirley – mixing
