= Erase the Slate =

Studio album by Dokken
- Released: June 15, 1999
- Recorded: 1998–99
- Studio: 710 Studio and Total Access Recording, Redondo Beach, Rover Studios, North Hollywood, California
- Genre: Hard rock
- Length: 47:52
- Label: CMC International (US); SPV/Steamhammer (Europe); Mercury (Japan)
- Producer: Dokken

Dokken chronology
Shadow Life (1997)	Erase the Slate (1999)	The Very Best of Dokken (1999)

Professional ratings
Review scores
Source	Rating
AllMusic	2/5 stars
Collector's Guide to Heavy Metal	8/10

Erase the Slate is the seventh studio album by American heavy metal band Dokken, released in 1999. It is the only Dokken studio album to feature former Winger guitarist Reb Beach and the last one with long-time bassist Jeff Pilson.

== Track listing ==
All tracks are written by Reb Beach, Mick Brown, Don Dokken, and Jeff Pilson except where noted.

No.	Title	Writer(s)	Length
1.	"Erase the Slate"		3:47
2.	"Change the World"		4:35
3.	"Maddest Hatter"		4:38
4.	"Drown"		4:53
5.	"Shattered"		4:40
6.	"One"	Harry Nilsson	3:10
7.	"Who Believes"		4:23
8.	"Voice of the Soul"		4:12
9.	"Crazy Mary Goes Round"		3:00
10.	"Haunted Lullabye"		4:47
11.	"In Your Honor"		4:31
12.	"Little Brown Pill" (Hidden track)		1:16

Japanese CD bonus tracks
No.	Title	Length
13.	"Upon Your Lips"	4:02
14.	"Sign of the Times"	3:14

== Personnel ==
Dokken

- Don Dokken - lead and backing vocals
- Reb Beach - lead and rhythm guitars
- Jeff Pilson - bass guitar, acoustic guitar, piano, mellotron, keyboards, backing vocals
- Mick Brown - drums, lead vocals on "Crazy Mary Goes Round", backing vocals

Production

- Rob Easterday - engineer
- Wyn Davis, Michael Perfitt - additional engineering
- Bernd Burgdorf, Scott Francisco, Wes Seidman - assistant engineers
- Tom Fletcher - mixing
- Rob Brill - mixing assistant
- Gene Grimaldi, Tom Baker - mastering at Oasis Mastering, Studio City, California

== Charts ==
Chart (1999)	Peak position
Japanese Albums (Oricon)	51
