= Tooth and Nail (Dokken album) =

Studio album by Dokken
- Released: September 17, 1984
- Recorded: April–August 1984
- Studio: Cherokee (Hollywood)
- Genres: Heavy metal; glam metal
- Length: 38:11
- Label: Elektra
- Producers: Tom Werman; Roy Thomas Baker

Dokken chronology
Breaking the Chains (1983)	Tooth and Nail (1984)	Under Lock and Key (1985)

Singles from Tooth and Nail
- 1. "Into the Fire" Released: September 11, 1984; 2. "Just Got Lucky" Released: November 19, 1984; 3. "Alone Again" Released: March 1985

Tooth and Nail is the second studio album by American heavy metal band Dokken, released on September 17, 1984 through Elektra Records.

After the unsuccessful US release of the band's 1983 debut album, Breaking the Chains, the record label was reluctant to give credit to Dokken for a follow-up. Dokken's management struggled to convince the label's executives to give the band another chance and this fight for recognition is reflected in the album's title. This album was the group's first with bassist Jeff Pilson following Juan Croucier's departure to join Ratt.

Tom Werman produced the album, but the recordings were hampered by the clash of egos between vocalist Don Dokken and guitarist George Lynch, who could not work together in a studio at the same time, and by the excesses of musicians and technicians. For these reasons, Werman was unable to carry on his work and quit the job after a few weeks, replaced by Roy Thomas Baker and Michael Wagener, who completed the recordings and mixed the album. The music of the album ranges from fast and aggressive tracks to pop and melodic ballads.

Tooth and Nail received positive reviews but was a slow seller, reaching the peak of No. 49 on the US Billboard 200 album chart and Gold status more than ten months after its release, on the wake of the success of the single "Alone Again" and of its accompanying music video. The album was certified Platinum by the RIAA in 1989, after both Under Lock and Key (1985) and Back for the Attack (1987) had achieved such status.

== Background ==
Elektra wanted to drop us. They said, 'Forget this band. They aren't going to go anywhere'. Our managers had to beg them to keep us on the label. They said, 'We'll give you one more shot'. So we were up against the wall. So that's why we came up with the title Tooth and Nail. If we're going to make it, it's going to be with a fight.

— Don Dokken.

After the release of their debut album Breaking the Chains in October 1981 through French label Carrere Records, Dokken had toured in support of the album in Europe, but were still relegated in local clubs in the US, where the album had not been issued.

Only when Dokken came under the management of the influential Q Prime of Cliff Burnstein and Peter Mensch, which also represented the successful Def Leppard, the band signed a contract with the major American label Elektra Records and eventually had the album released in their home country in 1983.

Dokken went on an arena tour in the US as support act for Aldo Nova, Blue Öyster Cult and Rainbow, but the band's increased exposure did not save the remixed reissue from commercial failure, and Elektra meditated to drop them. Their management convinced the label to finance the release of another album instead.

Meanwhile, bassist Juan Croucier had left Dokken to join the Los Angeles outfit Ratt and guitarist George Lynch had quit and rejoined multiple times. It was apparent from the start a manifest incompatibility of character between Lynch and vocalist Don Dokken, which prevented the two from working together and more than once escalated in open hostility. During Lynch's lapses of membership, Dokken tried out other guitarists, including Warren DeMartini, who later joined Ratt when that band's career began to take off. Lynch auditioned for Ozzy Osbourne's band to replace the deceased Randy Rhoads but was not selected, and finally settled in with Dokken after the release of their first album in the US. To fill in the vacant bass-player slot, Shrapnel Records manager Mike Varney suggested to Don Dokken a member of his band, Cinema, named Jeff Pilson, who joined the band after an audition in 1983.

== Composition and recording ==
Lynch began laying down guitar riffs and music ideas on a four-track recorder at his home in 1983, soon joined by Pilson and drummer Mick Brown. The three of them formed a cohesive songwriting team which produced several demos including lyrics and vocals. Don Dokken was excluded from this creative stage and worked on songs and lyrics on his own or with Pilson. The power ballad "Alone Again" was the result of a Dokken/Pilson collaboration and is the reworking of a song written by Dokken in 1975. Lynch opposed the inclusion of the song in the album because he did not want ballads in it, but was finally convinced otherwise. According to Don Dokken, the band wrote 25 songs in this period, which were then narrowed down to the ten best.

Before pre-production began, Don Dokken proposed as producer his German friend Michael Wagener, whose curriculum included works with Accept, Raven, Great White and the production and engineering of Breaking the Chains. Predictably, Wagener's friendship with Dokken and Lynch's dissatisfaction for the sound of their debut album brought to the rejection of the singer's proposal by the rest of the band. Elektra Records selected instead the expert Tom Werman to produce the album; his accomplishments in the music business included multi-platinum albums with Cheap Trick, Molly Hatchet, Ted Nugent and the production of rising stars Mötley Crüe's second album Shout at the Devil. Werman was present at rehearsals and helped to select and arrange the songs before production began. The recording of the album started in the spring of 1984 at Cherokee Studios in Hollywood, California with veteran sound engineer Geoff Workman, whose personality and erratic behaviour did not mesh easily with Werman's direction. This troubled relationship only added up to the escalating clash of egos between Lynch and Dokken, which was furtherly exacerbated by the abuse of cocaine and alcohol by musicians and technicians. Werman set the working schedule to avoid the contemporary presence of guitarist and vocalist in the studio, with the former recording with the rest of the band late morning and in the afternoon and the latter at night. This arrangement was maintained for all the permanence of George Lynch in the band, as he and Dokken never worked together in a recording studio. After a few weeks of work, the situation exploded when Lynch violently rejected Werman's advice for some of his guitar solos and refused to work again with the producer. Werman quit and left for a summer vacation with his family, bringing Don Dokken to request again the hiring of Michael Wagener to complete the recordings and mixing the tracks. Despite Werman and Burnstein's agreement on Wagener's involvement, the rest of the band continued to refuse him, jeopardizing the release of the album.

The singer expressed his concerns to the label executives and pleaded with them for Wagener's help. Elektra complied to Dokken's request, but hired also the British producer Roy Thomas Baker, famous for his work with Queen, Journey and The Cars and for his hedonistic lifestyle. Baker's main task was to keep the band in check and occupied while Wagener recorded lead vocals by night and mixed the album, secretly assisted by Dokken. Production also overcame the sudden and unmotivated disappearance of Lynch for a week and wrapped up recording and mixing in August 1984.

== Music style ==
Dokken are considered players of the hair/pop/glam metal subgenre by many critics and fans and Tooth and Nail is included in various polls of best glam metal albums. However, in a 2004 interview, Don Dokken disclaimed the band's belonging to that category and any comparison with acts like Mötley Crüe and Poison.

A more thorough analysis by Canadian music journalist Martin Popoff places Tooth and Nail in transition from the NWOBHM-influenced debut album towards a more melodic and poppier kind of music, similar to the rising glam metal which would dominate the LA scene in the following years. The extremes in music styles are touched with songs like the title track and "Turn On the Action", which resemble speed metal for their fast pace and aggressive riffs, versus "Just Got Lucky" and "Alone Again", typical pop metal songs. In another statement, Don Dokken himself acknowledged this shift in style, regarding it as more suited to his vocal limitations.

== Release and promotion ==
Tooth and Nail was mastered by George Marino at Sterling Sound in New York City and released on September 17, 1984.

The lead-off single for the album was "Into the Fire", which was released on September 11, 1984, and received enough radio coverage to spend eight weeks in the Top 40 of Billboard's Hot Mainstream Rock Tracks chart from October to December 1984, peaking at No. 21 and charting for a total of eleven weeks. The music video for this song also received moderate play on MTV. The song had a minor revamp in 1987, when it was featured in the soundtrack of the horror movie A Nightmare on Elm Street 3: Dream Warriors along with Dokken's newly written "Dream Warriors". The song can be heard in the VHS and DVD versions of the film in the opening sequence when the character Kristen Parker, played by Patricia Arquette, is listening to the radio in her bedroom.

"Just Got Lucky" was the second single, released on November 19, 1984 and somewhat less successful. Even though it was supported by a music video directed by Wayne Isham, it charted only on the Hot Mainstream Rock Tracks chart for seven weeks during January and February 1985 where it peaked at No. 27.

To support the release of the album, the band started a long US tour on October 9, 1984 in Texas. During the tour they were opening act for Twisted Sister and Y&T, Dio and Kiss. Dokken co-headlined a few dates with Loudness and concluded the tour on April 10, 1985 in Syracuse, New York, opening for Sammy Hagar. In the following months they ceased live activities to compose and record their third album Under Lock and Key, which was released on November 22, 1985.

Third and last single to the album "Alone Again" was released in March 1985, after the tour had concluded and became the band's biggest hit, spending fourteen weeks on the Hot Mainstream Rock Tracks chart, which included two at its peak position of No. 20. More significantly, the ballad was aided by strong rotation of the Isham-directed music video on MTV that spring and summer, giving the band their first and biggest hit on the Billboard Hot 100 chart, where its eleven-week run from May to July 1985 peaked at No. 64.

== Critical and commercial reception ==
Professional ratings
Review scores
Source	Rating
AllMusic	4/5 stars
The Collector's Guide to Heavy Metal	8/10

Tooth and Nail received mostly positive reviews. Paul Suter, in his review for the British magazine Kerrang!, praised Don Dokken's "strongly melodic" vocals and the "thunderous riffing and dazzling soloing" of George Lynch, judging the album probably not the band's best but "more than a match for the pretenders to the throne of LA Metaldome." Stephen Thomas Erlewine of AllMusic was enthusiastic of Lynch's guitar playing, claiming that "there isn't a single solo on the album that isn't worth hearing", and appreciated Don Dokken's voice for making even the most "clichéd material sound convincing". Taylor T. Carlson in his book HAIRcyclopedia Vol. 1 - The Legends calls Tooth and Nail a "true classic" among Dokken's production. Martin Popoff described the album's music as a mix of "Def Leppard-ish mood metal", "AOR-ish and pop-sweet" songs and "muscle-rockers." He put Dokken almost on par with Van Halen, both for the "live-feel bombast" of the music and for the "heated conflict between guitarist and vocalist."

Though clearly more an album act than a singles act, Dokken's album sales were tied to the videos for the singles from those albums. Tooth and Nail rose to No. 71 on the US Billboard 200 chart during the release of "Into the Fire", but fell off the charts for a week before re-entering and rising to No. 77 during the release of "Just Got Lucky". It was during the run of the third single "Alone Again" that the album, sliding down the charts after "Just Got Lucky" faded, reversed course and hit its peak of No. 49.

This time, Tooth and Nail would be certified Gold by the RIAA on August 13, 1985, the band's first certification, and would linger on the charts for the remainder of the year. This continued buoying of sales resulted in the unusual circumstance of the album being rated higher on the 1985 year-end charts (No. 35) than it had actually reached in its chart peak.

On March 16, 1989, on the strength of continued sales, Tooth and Nail, Dokken's first Gold album, was their third to be certified Platinum by the RIAA for sales of 1 million in the US alone.

== Track listing ==
All credits adapted from the original LP.

Side one
No.	Title	Writer(s)	Length
1.	"Without Warning" (instrumental)	George Lynch	1:35
2.	"Tooth and Nail"	Mick Brown, Lynch, Pilson	3:40
3.	"Just Got Lucky"	Lynch, Pilson	4:35
4.	"Heartless Heart"	Brown, Lynch, Pilson	3:29
5.	"Don't Close Your Eyes"	Don Dokken, Lynch, Pilson	4:10

Side two
No.	Title	Writer(s)	Length
6.	"When Heaven Comes Down"	Brown, Lynch, Pilson	3:35
7.	"Into the Fire"	D. Dokken, Lynch, Pilson	4:27
8.	"Bullets to Spare"	Brown, D. Dokken, Lynch, Pilson	3:35
9.	"Alone Again"	D. Dokken, Pilson	4:20
10.	"Turn On the Action"	Brown, Lynch, Pilson	4:43
Total length:			38:09

== Personnel ==
All credits adapted from the original LP.

=== Dokken ===
- Don Dokken – vocals
- George Lynch – guitar
- Jeff Pilson – bass, vocals
- Mick Brown – drums

=== Production ===
- Tom Werman – producer
- Roy Thomas Baker – associate producer
- Geoff Workman, Gary McGachan – engineering
- Michael Wagener – mixing
- George Marino – mastering at Sterling Sound, New York
- Bob Defrin – art direction

== Charts ==
Chart (1984–85)	Peak position
US Billboard 200	49

== Certifications ==
Region	Certification	Certified units/sales
United States (RIAA)	Platinum	1,000,000^{^}
^{^} Shipments figures based on certification alone.

== See also ==
- List of glam metal albums and songs
