= Greg Leon =

American rock musician

- Born: Gregory Jay Leon; May 19, 1958 (age 68); Glendale, California, U.S.
- Genres: Heavy metal, glam metal, hard rock
- Occupation: Musician
- Instruments: Guitar, vocals
- Years active: 1977–present

Gregory Jay Leon (born May 19, 1958) is an American guitarist best known for his involvement with American heavy metal bands Quiet Riot and toured with Dokken. He also played with future Mötley Crüe drummer Tommy Lee and bassist Nikki Sixx.

== Career ==
Greg Leon was born in 1958 and grew up in Glendale, California, a foothills community of Los Angeles. As a teenager he was heavily influenced by T. Rex and the guitar playing of Marc Bolan. In his early twenties, Leon formed a power trio called Suite 19 as lead guitarist and vocalist, a band which included future Great White/Dokken drummer Gary Holland. Holland was soon replaced by future Mötley Crüe drummer Tommy Lee. Lee was a fan of the band who showed up for every gig they played in Los Angeles. When drummer Holland left the band, Leon immediately approached Lee, who "knew all the songs and fit right in". With Leon writing all the band's material, Suite 19 became regulars at West Hollywood clubs such as the Whisky a Go Go, The Starwood, and The Troubadour and subsequently the band earned the attention of record labels and became one of the more promising young bands on the Sunset Strip club circuit in the late 1970s.

Lee described Leon as "a little Eddie Van Halen" and said Suite 19's music sounded like "a heavier version of T. Rex and Slade".

When Randy Rhoads left Quiet Riot to record with Ozzy Osbourne in 1979, Leon was hired as his replacement and Suite 19 were no more. Lee was furious at Leon; "He and his folks didn't want to see me or talk to me. We went from being good friends to never talking. I was dead to him. So I said, 'Listen, Tommy, let me make a name for myself, and I'll come back and get you once I see this through,'" Leon recalled. His time in Quiet Riot would be brief, however, as the band's vocalist Kevin DuBrow "was impossible to work with". Leon subsequently joined Dokken at the insistence of Don Dokken and he played a handful of European gigs with the band. After being rejected by record labels who were more interested in new wave bands, Leon left Dokken and was replaced by George Lynch. During this period, Leon also moonlighted as a guitar teacher at Musonia music school in Burbank, owned and operated by the family of Randy Rhoads.

After leaving Dokken, Leon reconnected with Tommy Lee and the pair set about forming a new band, a band which would eventually become Mötley Crüe. The pair attended the farewell gig of a popular local band called London, and Lee became obsessed with their bassist, Nikki Sixx. Lee "just loved how Nikki looked. He was gung-ho about him, saying, 'This is the guy we should get'," according to Leon. Though Sixx was a friend of Leon's, he auditioned twice and was rejected due to not being able to play his instrument, and Leon felt the bassist's musicianship was "awful". Lee made the decision to hire Sixx, prompting Leon to quit in protest; "The way I saw it was that my guitar playing would get me through. I didn't need a guy like Nikki dragging me down. I had seen London many times, and I knew I wanted none of it," he recalled.

Leon subsequently formed The Greg Leon Invasion, a group that has released several albums.

== Personal life ==
Leon is married to Canadian singer Suza Wood. In 2005, he produced her first album titled Sweet Freedom.

== Discography ==
=== The Greg Leon Invasion ===
- Greg Leon Invasion (1983)
- Born to Die (1984)
- Unfinished Business (2005)
- Guitars, Cars and Women (2010)
- Tell the Children (2021)

=== Wishing Well ===
- Wishing Well (1997)

=== Suza ===
- Sweet Freedom (2005)
