= Under Lock and Key =

1985 studio album by Dokken

Studio album by Dokken
- Released: November 22, 1985
- Studios: Amigo Studios, North Hollywood, Los Angeles; Le Mobile remote unit; Total Access Recording, Redondo Beach, California
- Genre: Glam metal
- Length: 42:25
- Label: Elektra
- Producers: Neil Kernon, Michael Wagener

Dokken chronology
Tooth and Nail (1984)	Under Lock and Key (1985)	Back for the Attack (1987)

Singles from Under Lock and Key
- 1. "The Hunter" Released: December 10, 1985; 2. "In My Dreams" Released: February 25, 1986; 3. "It's Not Love" Released: June 1986

Under Lock and Key is the third studio album by American heavy metal band Dokken, released on November 22, 1985, through Elektra Records. The album reached No. 32 on the U.S. Billboard 200 and remained on that chart for 67 weeks. Two singles also charted: "The Hunter" and "In My Dreams", both reaching No. 25 and 24 on Billboard's Mainstream Rock respectively, with "In My Dreams" at No. 77 on the Billboard Hot 100. Under Lock and Key was certified Gold on March 4, 1986, and Platinum on April 14, 1987.

== Music ==
The album's opener "Unchain the Night" is considered by some to be among the heaviest glam metal tracks. The song contains an acoustic intro. The guitar solo was described as "catacomb-clearing" by Revolver.

== Critical reception ==
Professional ratings
Review scores
Source	Rating
AllMusic	4.5/5 stars
The Collector's Guide to Heavy Metal	6/10

The album received mostly positive reviews. Eduardo Rivadavia in his review for AllMusic calls Under Lock and Key "quite possibly Dokken's most 'complete' album, with a little something for every type of fan", like "fist-pumping headbangers", extraordinary "bittersweet mid-paced rockers" ("Unchain the Night" and "The Hunter") and "saccharine ballads". Rivadavia recommends the album as the best introduction to new listeners of Dokken, but notes that heavy metal purists would likely prefer the band's 1984 album Tooth and Nail.

Canadian journalist Martin Popoff considers the album "too weighted towards Def Leppard's fat-and-open formula rock", resulting "a bit subdued and predictable" in comparison with its predecessor. The band's glamorous look, the media exposure and George Lynch's "attempt to define the L.A. sound in his own image" do not save Under Lock and Key from sounding "like the work of a band just fed".

== Track listing ==
All credits adapted from the original LP.

All writing credited to Dokken (Don Dokken, George Lynch, Jeff Pilson, Mick Brown)

Side one
No.	Title	Length
1.	"Unchain the Night"	5:19
2.	"The Hunter"	4:07
3.	"In My Dreams"	4:20
4.	"Slippin' Away"	3:48
5.	"Lightnin' Strikes Again"	3:48

Side two
No.	Title	Length
6.	"It's Not Love"	5:01
7.	"Jaded Heart"	4:16
8.	"Don't Lie to Me"	3:37
9.	"Will the Sun Rise"	4:10
10.	"Til the Livin' End"	3:59
Total length:		42:25

== Personnel ==
All credits adapted from the original LP.

=== Dokken ===
- Don Dokken – lead vocals
- George Lynch – guitars
- Jeff Pilson – bass, background vocals
- Mick Brown – drums, background vocals

=== Additional musicians ===
- Chris Currell – Synclavier programming

=== Production ===
- Neil Kernon, Michael Wagener – producers, engineers, mixing
- Mark Wilczak – assistant engineer and mixing
- Cliff Bonell, Michael Lardie – assistant engineers
- Bob Ludwig – mastering at Masterdisk, New York

== Charts ==
Chart (1985–86)	Peak position
Canada Top Albums/CDs (RPM)	95
Japanese Albums (Oricon)	56
US Billboard 200	32

== Certifications ==
Region	Certification	Certified units/sales
United States (RIAA)	Platinum	1,000,000^{^}
^{^} Shipments figures based on certification alone.

== Accolades ==
Publication	Country	Accolade	Rank
Rolling Stone	US	50 Greatest Hair Metal Albums of All Time	21
Metal Rules	US	Top 50 Glam Metal Albums	11

== Unchain the Night ==
Unchain the Night

Video by Dokken
- Released: 27 October 1986
- Genres: Heavy metal; glam metal
- Length: 44:30
- Label: Elektra/Asylum Records

Dokken video albums chronology
Unchain the Night (1986)	One Live Night (1995)

The music videos produced for the singles from the three Dokken albums were featured on a longform videocassette release, Unchain the Night, by Elektra/Asylum Records through Elektra Entertainment. That video debuted on Billboard's Top Music Video—Longform chart at No. 11 in January 1987, peaking at No. 5 that May. The video collection was certified Gold in April 1987, and Platinum the following April.

In 2007 the collection was re-released in DVD by Rhino Home Video through Warner Music Vision, debuting on the Billboard Comprehensive Music Videos chart at No. 27.

=== VHS track listing ===
1. "Into The Fire"
2. "Just Got Lucky"
3. "Breaking The Chains"
4. "Alone Again"
5. "The Hunter"
6. "In My Dreams"
7. "It's Not Love"

=== Certifications ===
Region	Certification	Certified units/sales
United States (RIAA)	Platinum	100,000^{^}
^{^} Shipments figures based on certification alone.

== See also ==
- List of glam metal albums and songs
