= Too High to Fly =

Single by Dokken

from the album Dysfunctional
- Released: 1995
- Genre: Heavy metal
- Length: 7:10
- Label: Columbia
- Songwriter(s): Don Dokken; George Lynch
- Producer(s): Don Dokken; Michael Wagener

Dokken singles chronology
| "Walk Away" (1989) | "Too High to Fly" (1995) | "Shadows of Life" (1995) |

"Too High to Fly" is a song by American heavy metal band Dokken, released in 1995 on the album Dysfunctional. The song peaked at number 29 on the Hot Mainstream Rock Tracks chart in the United States.

== Track listing ==
| No. | Title | Length |
|---|---|---|
| 1. | "Too High to Fly" (Edit) | 4:47 |
| 2. | "Too High to Fly" (Album Version) | 7:10 |
