= The Hunter (Dokken song) =

- Cover for the Japanese single release

Single by Dokken

from the album Under Lock and Key
- Released: December 10, 1985 (Japan)
- Recorded: 1985
- Genre: Heavy metal; glam metal
- Length: 4:06
- Label: Elektra
- Songwriters: Mick Brown, Don Dokken, George Lynch, Jeff Pilson
- Producers: Neil Kernon, Michael Wagener

Dokken singles chronology
| "Just Got Lucky" (1984) | "The Hunter" (1985) | "In My Dreams" (1986) |

"The Hunter" is a song by American heavy metal band Dokken, released in 1985 on the album Under Lock and Key. The song was released as the first single from the album. The song peaked at number 25 on the Mainstream Rock chart in the United States. The song remained on the chart for 9 weeks.

== Track listing ==
7" single (Japan)

Side A
| No. | Title | Length |
|---|---|---|
| 1. | "The Hunter" | 4:06 |

Side B
| No. | Title | Length |
|---|---|---|
| 1. | "Til' the Living End" | 3:59 |

12" single (US promo)

Side A
| No. | Title | Length |
|---|---|---|
| 1. | "The Hunter" | 4:06 |

Side B
| No. | Title | Length |
|---|---|---|
| 1. | "The Hunter" | 4:06 |
