= Breaking the Chains (song) =

- Cover for the Elektra Records 7" single

Single by Dokken

from the album Breaking the Chains
- B-side: "Felony" (7" single); "Paris Is Burning" (12" single)
- Released: November 1983 (US)
- Recorded: 1981
- Studio: Dierks Studio, Cologne, Germany
- Genre: Glam metal, hard rock
- Length: 3:51
- Label: Elektra
- Songwriters: Don Dokken, George Lynch
- Producers: Michael Wagener, Dokken

Dokken singles chronology
"We're Illegal" (1982)	"Breaking the Chains" (1983)	"Into the Fire" (1984)

Music video
- "Breaking the Chains" on YouTube

"Breaking the Chains" is a song by American heavy metal/glam metal band Dokken, appearing on the band's debut album of the same name. The song was originally released as a single "Breakin' the Chains" in 1981 through Carrere Records exclusively in Europe, appearing as the B-side to the "I Can't See You" single. "Breaking the Chains" was released as a single in 1983 through Elektra Records, being the band's first American single. The song was a modest success, peaking at #32 on the Billboard Mainstream Rock chart. The song remained on the chart for 13 weeks.

== Reception ==
In a mixed review of the album, AllMusic reviewer Whitney Z. Gomes praised the track and picked it as an AllMusic reviewer's pick.

== Music video ==
A video was produced for the song. It begins cutting between the band performing the song in a house and performing on a black stage. The band is later chained up in a dungeon before George Lynch breaks free and performs the song's solo. As Lynch performs the solo, the other band members break free one by one. After the solo, Don Dokken wakes up chained to a bed, alone, before breaking free. The video ends with shots of the band performing in the house, in the dungeon, and against a backdrop of chains that explode as the video ends.

Jeff Pilson appears in the video on bass as Juan Croucier had left the band before filming began.

== Track listing ==
7" single

Side A
No.	Title	Writer(s)	Length
1.	"Breaking the Chains"	Don Dokken, George Lynch	3:51

Side B
No.	Title	Writer(s)	Length
1.	"Felony"	D. Dokken	3:07

12" single

Side A
No.	Title	Length
1.	"Breaking the Chains"	3:51

Side B
No.	Title	Length
1.	"Paris Is Burning" (Edit of LP Version)	3:37
2.	"Paris Is Burning" (Live)	5:07

== Personnel ==
- Don Dokken – lead vocals, rhythm guitar
- George Lynch – lead guitar
- Juan Croucier – bass, backing vocals
- "Wild" Mick Brown – drums

== Charts ==
Chart (1983)	Peak position
US Mainstream Rock (Billboard)	32
