= Breaking the Chains (album) =

- First edition cover art

Studio album by Dokken
- Released: 1981 (Europe); May 1982 (UK); September 1983 (US)
- Studio: Dierks Studios, Cologne
- Genre: Heavy metal; glam metal
- Length: 34:37 (1981 version); 36:24 (1983 version)
- Label: Carrere; Elektra
- Producer: Michael Wagener, Dokken

Dokken chronology
Back in the Streets (1979)	Breaking the Chains (1981)	Tooth and Nail (1984)

Singles from Breaking the Chains
- 1. "I Can't See You" Released: 1981 (Germany); 2. "Young Girls" Released: 1981 (Germany); 3. "We're Illegal" Released: April 1982 (UK); 4. "Breaking the Chains" Released: November 1983 (US)

Alternative cover
- 1983 reissue

Professional ratings
Review scores
Source	Rating
AllMusic	2.5/5 stars
The Collector's Guide to Heavy Metal	7/10

Breaking the Chains is the debut studio album by American heavy metal band Dokken. It was originally released in Europe as Breakin' the Chains on the French label Carrere Records, in 1981. This version contains different mixes and titles of songs from the later U.S. edition. "Paris Is Burning" is called "Paris", and is actually a studio version as opposed to the live recording in Berlin from December 1982. The album also contains a song called "We're Illegal", which later turned into "Live to Rock (Rock to Live)".

The album was remixed, partially re-recorded, renamed and released in the US in 1983 by Elektra Records, and reached number 136 on the Billboard 200 chart. The album was considered a flop by the label, which had the intention to drop the band. However, Dokken management convinced Elektra they could make a more successful album, which materialized in Tooth and Nail in September 1984. Breaking the Chains' title track was named the 62nd greatest hard rock song by VH1. It is featured on the radio station "V-ROCK" in the 2006 video game Grand Theft Auto: Vice City Stories.

In a discussion with George Lynch on January 26, 2011, he mentioned the existence of 500 copies of the Carrere Records Breakin' the Chains version printed with the Don Dokken moniker, instead of Dokken. This version also featured different album cover art.

== Track listing ==
=== 1981 Breakin' the Chains (Carrere Records) ===
All writing credited to Don Dokken and George Lynch, except where noted

Side one
No.	Title	Writer(s)	Length
1.	"Breaking the Chains"		3:50
2.	"Seven Thunders"	Dokken, Lynch, Mick Brown	3:50
3.	"I Can't See You"	Dokken, Juan Croucier	3:30
4.	"In the Middle"		3:45
5.	"We're Illegal"	Dokken, Lynch, Croucier	3:37

Side two
No.	Title	Writer(s)	Length
6.	"Paris"		3:42
7.	"Stick to Your Guns"		3:30
8.	"Young Girls"		3:15
9.	"Felony"		3:07
10.	"Nightrider"	Dokken, Lynch, Brown	3:11
Total length:			34:37

=== 1983 Breaking the Chains (Elektra Records) ===
Side one
No.	Title	Writer(s)	Length
1.	"Breaking the Chains"		3:43
2.	"In the Middle"		3:43
3.	"Felony"		3:08
4.	"I Can't See You"	Dokken, Juan Croucier	3:12
5.	"Live to Rock (Rock to Live)"	Dokken, Lynch, Croucier	3:39

Side two
No.	Title	Writer(s)	Length
6.	"Nightrider"	Dokken, Lynch, Mick Brown	3:13
7.	"Seven Thunders"	Dokken, Lynch, Brown	3:55
8.	"Young Girls"		3:14
9.	"Stick to Your Guns"		3:25
10.	"Paris Is Burning" (live in Berlin, December 1982)		5:07
Total length:			36:24

== Personnel ==
=== 1981 Album ===
- Don Dokken – lead and backing vocals, rhythm guitar, lead guitar (7, 8)
- George Lynch – lead guitar (1–5, 9, 10), overdubbed solo (6)
- Peter Baltes – bass (1–4, 6–8, 10), backing vocals (3, 6)
- Juan Croucier – bass and co-lead vocals (5, 9)
- Mick Brown – drums (1–5, 9, 10), backing vocals (3)
- Bobby Blotzer – drums (6–8)

Tracks 6, 7 and 8 were recorded at Dierks Studios as demos for Carrere. Don Dokken, Peter Baltes, and Bobby Blotzer were involved. Later, the main album sessions commenced with Dokken and Baltes as well as George Lynch and Mick Brown. Lynch overdubbed a guitar solo on track 6. The band soon returned to Germany with Juan Croucier, their regular bassist, to record tracks 5 and 9.

=== 1983 Album ===
- Don Dokken – lead and backing vocals, rhythm guitar
- George Lynch – lead guitar
- Peter Baltes, Tom Croucier – bass
- Mick Brown – drums

=== Production ===
- Michael Wagener – production, engineering, mixing
- Wyn Davis – mixing
- Joe Gastwirt – mastering

== Charts ==
Chart (1983)	Peak position
Japanese Albums (Oricon)	75
US Billboard 200	136

== Certifications ==
Region	Certification	Certified units/sales
United States (RIAA)	Gold	500,000^{^}
^{^} Shipments figures based on certification alone.

== Notes ==
On the original Breakin' the Chains Carrere Records version, released under the name Don Dokken, several song titles are misspelled on the back cover. Namely "I Can't See You" ("I Can See You"), "Stick to Your Guns" ("Still to Your Guns"), and "Young Girls" ("Young Girl"). On the French Carrere vinyl release, the songs are spelled correctly, but George Lynch's name is misspelled as "Georges Lynch".
