= Into the Fire (Dokken song) =

- Cover art for the Japanese single release

Single by Dokken

from the album Tooth and Nail
- Released: September 11, 1984 (US); December 21, 1984 (Japan)
- Recorded: April–July 1984
- Studio: Cherokee Studios, Hollywood, California
- Genre: Glam metal
- Length: 4:30
- Label: Elektra
- Songwriters: Don Dokken; George Lynch; Jeff Pilson
- Producers: Tom Werman; Roy Thomas Baker

Dokken singles chronology
| "Breaking the Chains" (1983) | "Into the Fire" (1984) | "Just Got Lucky" (1984) |

Music video
- "Into the Fire" on YouTube

"Into the Fire" is a song by American heavy metal band Dokken, released on September 11, 1984 on the album Tooth and Nail. The song peaked at number 21 on the Hot Mainstream Rock Tracks chart in the United States.

It was featured in the 1987 film A Nightmare on Elm Street 3: Dream Warriors along with a title track named after the film.

The song was absent on the VHS release but was reinstated on the original DVD release and all future releases thereon.

In 2019, the song was used as the theme music to the National Wrestling Alliance's weekly wrestling show, NWA Power, and was the namesake for their pay-per-view event, NWA Into the Fire.

== Track listing ==
Side A
| No. | Title | Length |
|---|---|---|
| 1. | "Into the Fire" | 4:30 |

Side B
| No. | Title | Length |
|---|---|---|
| 1. | "Bullets to Spare" | 3:32 |

== Chart positions ==
| Chart (1984) | Peak position |
|---|---|
| US Main | 21 |

== Personnel ==
- Don Dokken – lead vocals
- George Lynch – guitar
- Jeff Pilson – bass, backing vocals
- Mick Brown – drums
