= Just Got Lucky (Dokken song) =

Single by Dokken

from the album Tooth and Nail
- Released: November 19, 1984
- Recorded: 1984
- Studio: Cherokee (Hollywood)
- Genre: Heavy metal
- Length: 4:30
- Label: Elektra
- Songwriters: George Lynch; Jeff Pilson
- Producers: Tom Werman; Roy Thomas Baker

Dokken singles chronology
"Into the Fire" (1984)	"Just Got Lucky" (1984)	"Alone Again" (1985)

Music video
- "Just Got Lucky" on YouTube

"Just Got Lucky" is a song by American heavy metal band Dokken, released as the second single from their second studio album Tooth and Nail (1984). The song peaked at number 27 on the Billboard mainstream rock chart.

In 1985, while Dokken toured with Dio in Hawaii, the band decided to film a video for the single, “Just Got Lucky”. They wanted to film Lynch’s guitar solo atop an active volcano. While filming, seismic activity developed and steam started coming up, making it difficult for him to breathe. He said he could feel the heat through his shoes, but continued playing on. As night fell, park rangers came to warn the band and crew they needed to leave immediately. They were on the plane when the volcano later blew, and the camera crew spent about an hour circling the eruption for extra footage.

The song was performed live in Tokyo, Japan in April 1988 and was released in November 1988 on Beast from the East. It was also included on the 1999 compilation, The Very Best of Dokken, and the 2006 album, The Definitive Rock Collection.

== Track listing ==
Side A
No.	Title	Length
1.	"Just Got Lucky"	4:35

Side B
No.	Title	Length
1.	"Don't Close Your Eyes"	4:06

== Chart positions ==
Chart (1985)	Peak position
US Main	27

== Personnel ==
- Don Dokken – lead vocals
- George Lynch – guitar
- Jeff Pilson – bass, backing vocals
- Mick Brown – drums
