= Alone Again (Dokken song) =

1985 single by Dokken

Single by Dokken

from the album Tooth and Nail
- Released: March 4, 1985 (US); July 25, 1985 (Japan)
- Recorded: 1975, April–August 1984
- Studio: Cherokee Studios, Hollywood
- Genre: Glam metal; hard rock
- Length: 4:30
- Label: Elektra Records
- Songwriters: Don Dokken; Jeff Pilson
- Producers: Tom Werman; Roy Thomas Baker

Dokken singles chronology
"Just Got Lucky" (1984)	"Alone Again" (1985)	"The Hunter" (1985)

Music video
- "Alone Again" on YouTube

"Alone Again" is a power ballad written and released by the American heavy metal band Dokken on their 1984 album Tooth and Nail. The single reached #64 on the Billboard Hot 100 and #20 on the Hot Mainstream Rock Tracks chart in 1985. The song was written by singer Don Dokken and bassist Jeff Pilson.

== Composition ==
Don Dokken wrote the song in 1975, when he was 22 years old, recorded it on a cassette, and it stayed in a closet for nearly a decade. During the recording of Tooth and Nail, many other glam metal bands at the time were releasing ballads, so Elektra Records told Dokken they needed a ballad. This prompted Don to search his closet and rediscover the song, which he reworked with bassist Jeff Pilson in the studio. "People ask me all the time, 'Who did you write it about?' I don't know. 'Was it about a girlfriend?' I don't know! I just wrote it. My memory's not that good," said Dokken.

== Music video ==
Its lyrics talk about a man's depression after a break-up. The music video had a story similar to a lot of other power ballads. Almost 70% of it is filmed in black and white along with some coloured scenes. It shows the band performing the song live along with some shots of Don Dokken being alone in a room.

== Track listing ==
US 7" single

Side A
No.	Title	Length
1.	"Alone Again"	4:20

Side B
No.	Title	Length
1.	"Tooth and Nail"	3:40

Alone Again / Just Got Lucky 7" and 12" single

Side A
No.	Title	Length
1.	"Alone Again"	4:20

Side B
No.	Title	Length
1.	"Just Got Lucky"	4:30

CD single

No.	Title	Length
1.	"Alone Again" (Live Edit)	4:29
2.	"Alone Again" (Live Extended Edit)	5:22

== Charts ==
Chart (1985)	Peak position
US Billboard Hot 100	64
US Top Rock Tracks (Billboard)	20

== Personnel ==
- Don Dokken – vocals
- George Lynch – guitar
- Jeff Pilson – bass guitar, keyboards, vocals
- Mick Brown – drums
