= Jeff Pilson =

American bassist (born 1958)

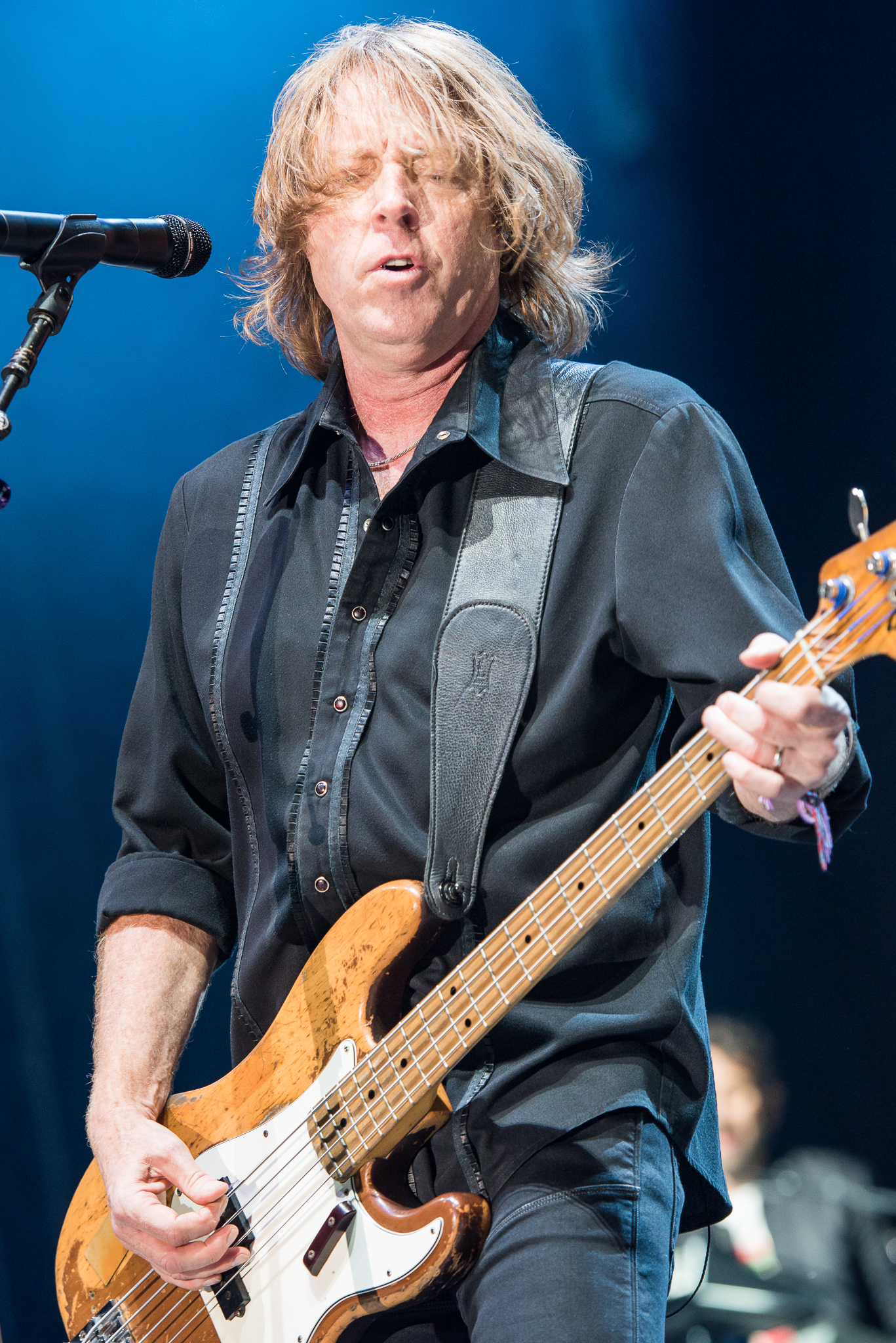
- Pilson performing with Foreigner in 2016.

Background information
- Born: Jeffrey Steven Pilson; 19 January 1958 (age 68); Lake Forest, Illinois, U.S.
- Genres: Hard rock; heavy metal; glam metal
- Occupations: Musician; songwriter; actor; record producer
- Instruments: Bass guitar; keyboards; vocals; guitar
- Years active: 1976–present
- Member of: Foreigner; Black Swan; The End Machine
- Formerly of: Dokken; Wild Horses; MSG; Dio; T & N; Lynch Mob
- Website: jeffpilson.com

Jeffrey Steven Pilson (born January 19, 1958) is an American musician best known for being the bass player in the glam metal band Dokken and currently classic rock band Foreigner. He has also had an extended stint with Dio in the 1990s.

== Biography ==
Pilson was born on 19 January 1958 in Lake Forest, Illinois. He is of Irish descent.

He spent part of his youth in Milwaukee, Wisconsin before moving to Longview, Washington, where he graduated from R.A. Long High School in 1976.

He attended the University of Washington to study music after he had started playing bass at age 13 but left prior to earning a degree in order to pursue a career in music.

One of his early bands was an Emerson, Lake & Palmer-type progressive trio called Christmas. He moved to San Francisco in 1978 where he met and became friends with guitarist Mike Varney.

Pilson and Varney would join forces in the band Cinema. After moving back to Seattle for a brief period, Varney called Pilson to get involved in the recording of Rock Justice, a rock opera co-written by Varney and produced by Marty Balin.

Still based in San Francisco, Pilson next teamed up with guitarist Randy Hansen, best known as a Jimi Hendrix impersonator, and Pilson recorded the Astral Projection – Live album with Hansen for Shrapnel Records.

When the band with Hansen dissolved, Pilson moved to Los Angeles and several weeks later, on a recommendation by Mike Varney, was contacted by vocalist Don Dokken who was looking for a bass player for his band Dokken.

An audition was set up and Pilson joined the band in October 1983.

Pilson was co-writer on many of Dokken's best known and most successful songs, including Just Got Lucky, Alone Again, Into the Fire, The Hunter, In My Dreams, It's Not Love, Kiss of Death, and Dream Warriors. Pilson recorded the studio albums Tooth and Nail (1984), Under Lock and Key (1985), and Back for the Attack (1987), all certified platinum, and the gold certified live album Beast from the East (1988).

After the breakup of Dokken in the wake of the Monsters of Rock Tour 1988, Pilson, along with Randy Hansen, Vinny Appice and Michael Diamond of Legs Diamond, formed his own group called Flesh & Blood in 1989, handling lead vocal and rhythm guitar duties.

After changing the name to War & Peace, Pilson released a total of four albums, starting with 1993's Time Capsule, utilizing different players and lineups along the way.

The recordings of the original Flesh & Blood lineup were released in 1999 and re-issued in 2013 with a bonus track, packaged with recordings from another session, under the name War & Peace as The Flesh and Blood Sessions.

In the early 1990s, Pilson also worked as a session bassist with the band Wild Horses (not to be confused with the British band of the same name), guitarist Michael Lee Firkins, and MSG, before taking part in the Dokken reunion which resulted in 1995's Dysfunctional album. It was followed by the semi-acoustic One Live Night (1995), the controversial Shadowlife (1997), and Erase the Slate (1999), Pilson's last studio album with the group. During the 1990s, Pilson also recorded and toured with Dio, appearing on both Strange Highways (1993) and Angry Machines (1996).

In 1993, Pilson collaborated with former Giuffria and Dio guitarist Craig Goldy, co-writing and contributing lead vocals to 4 songs on Goldy's first solo album, Insufficient Therapy, issued on Shrapnel Records in 1993. During that time, Pilson, Goldy and drummer Tim Pedersen also had a heavy progressive rock project named 13th Floor although no album was ever released.

After exiting both Dio and Dokken, he and former War & Peace mate, Tommy Henriksen, began working on a modern rock project called Underground Moon, for which Pilson decided to assume the pseudonym Dominic Moon. The album, which included a cover of Midnight Oil's "Beds Are Burning", was released in Europe and Japan in 2001 and Pilson put together a short-lived live band and performed a handful of L.A. club shows. The album saw a limited edition re-issue in 2008 through Polish company Metal Mind Productions.

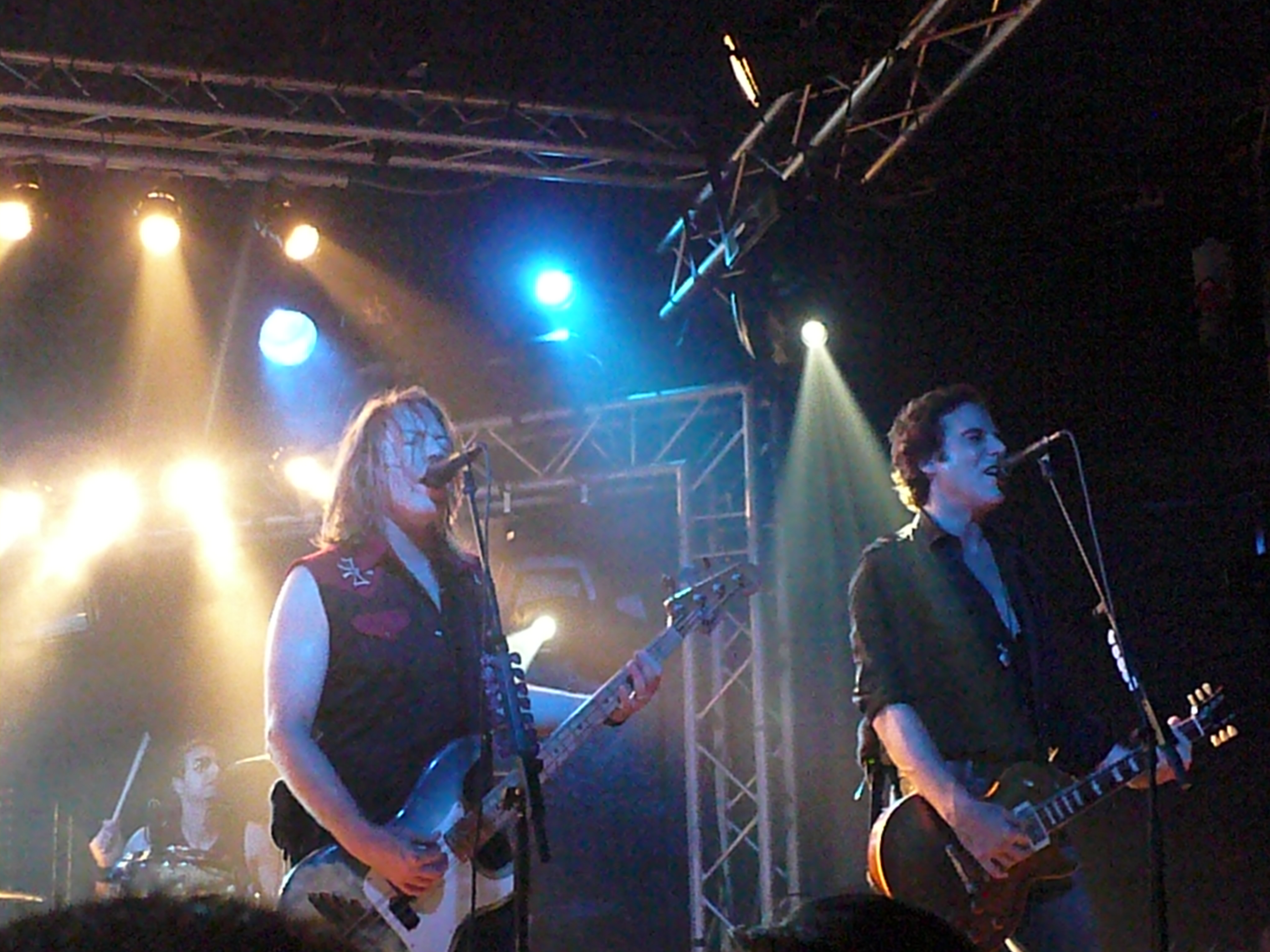
Pilson (left) with Foreigner in 2009

On the heels of Underground Moon, Pilson reunited with his ex-Dokken bandmate, guitarist George Lynch, in a project called Lynch/Pilson, releasing the album Wicked Underground in 2003. After a proposed Dokken reunion did not materialize, Pilson re-teamed with Lynch and drummer Mick Brown in Tooth & Nail, later shortened to T & N in 2011. They would release Slave to the Empire, an album of re-worked Dokken songs and new material involving a plethora of guest vocalists in the fall of 2012. Pilson was also confirmed as the bass player on the Lynch Mob's forthcoming 2015 studio release.

Pilson briefly returned to Dio to help record the band's final studio album, Master of the Moon. He became the bass player for Foreigner in the summer of 2004 when he joined an impromptu lineup consisting of founding member Mick Jones, Jason Bonham, Jeff Jacobs, Thom Gimbel, and Bonham singer Chas West for a benefit show for muscular dystrophy on July 25, 2004, in Santa Barbara, CA at Fess Parker's Doubletree Resort. West would be replaced by Kelly Hansen, formerly with Hurricane, who made his debut with the group on March 11, 2005, at Boulder Station in Las Vegas. Pilson has been part of every Foreigner recording and tour since, including the 2009 studio album, Can't Slow Down.

Pilson would play bass on Lynch Mob's 2015 album, Rebel. In the fall of 2016, Pilson and the classic Dokken lineup of Don Dokken, George Lynch, and 'Wild' Mick Brown reunited for 6 shows in Japan. They also played a warm-up show at Badlands Pawn Guns Gold And Rock 'N' Roll in Sioux Falls, SD. The band's October 8 Loud Park performance at Saitama Super Arena in Saitama, Japan was commemorated with the Return to the East Live 2016 CD/DVD/Blu-ray package in 2018; it also included an exclusive new studio track, "It's Just Another Day".

In 2018, Pilson would once again get together with Dokken and T&N mates George Lynch and Mick Brown and former Lynch Mob vocalist, Robert Mason, who earlier guested on a remake of Dokken's "It's Not Love" on T&N's Slave to the Empire. Initially called Superstroke, the name was changed to The End Machine for the band's eponymous 2019 debut album, produced by Pilson.

2020 saw Pilson part of yet another all-star project involving former bandmates, Robin McAuley and Reb Beach, as well as drummer Matt Starr from Mr. Big. Dubbed Black Swan, the quartet issued their Pilson produced debut album, Shake the World, on February 14, 2020, prefaced by videos for the songs "Shake the World" and "Big Disaster".

On October 31, 2022, it was announced the Pilson had joined forces with guitarist Joel Hoekstra and drummer Deen Castronovo to become part of the band Revolution Saints.

== Production work ==
In addition to producing his own projects starting with War & Peace, Pilson has also worked in that capacity with several other acts, helming Benedictum's Uncreation (2006) and Seasons of Tragedy (2008), respectively, and Adler's Back from the Dead (2012). He produced Foreigner's 2006 CD, Live in '05, as well as tracks off of their 2008 No End in Sight release as well as their most recent effort, The Best of Foreigner 4 & More (2014). He returned as producer for Benedictum in 2012 for their fourth album, Obey (2013).

In December 2012 it was revealed that Pilson would produce the second album by Kill Devil Hill, featuring Pilson's former Flesh & Blood and Dio bandmate Vinny Appice on drums. Pilson also wrote all but two songs and produced the latest Starship feat. Mickey Thomas album, Loveless Fascination (2013), the group's first new studio release in almost a quarter century.

As of late 2014, Pilson had resumed production work on the debut album by Last in Line, a band featuring original Dio members Vinny Appice, Jimmy Bain, and Vivian Campbell, with Andrew Freeman on vocals, which is due out in 2015.

Pilson has also produced his two latest musical projects, The End Machine and Black Swan, whose debut albums were released through Italian label Frontiers Records in 2019 and 2020, respectively.

== Acting appearances ==
Pilson has also worked as an actor, having appeared in the movie Rock Star, 2001. Pilson played bassist Jorgen, of the fictional band Steel Dragon, along with Zakk Wylde, future Foreigner bandmate, Jason Bonham, who also contributed to the Soundtrack, with Miljenko Matijevic and Jeff Scott Soto as vocalists, who cannot be seen.

He also contributed to the Mortal Kombat reboot, performing the voice acting for Johnny Cage.

== Equipment ==
Pilson's current bass is a 1973 Fender P-Bass with '66 pickups running through an Ampeg SVT. In the studio Pilson runs all of his basses through Ampeg SVTs, as well as the Ampeg SVX plug-in from IK Multimedia.

He is a multi-instrumentalist who also plays guitar, drums, flute, cello and violin.

== Discography ==
with Rock Justice

- Rock Justice (1980)

with Randy Hansen

- Astral Projection – Live (1983)

with Dokken

- Tooth and Nail (1984)
- Under Lock and Key (1985)
- Back for the Attack (1987)
- Beast from the East (1988)
- Dysfunctional (1995)
- One Live Night (1996)
- Shadowlife (1997)
- Erase the Slate (1999)
- Live from the Sun (2000)
- Return to the East Live 2016 (2018)

with Michael Lee Firkins

- Michael Lee Firkins (1990)

with Wild Horses

- Bareback (1991)
- Dead Ahead (2003)

with McAuley Schenker Group

- MSG (1991)

with George Lynch

- Sacred Groove (1993)

with Craig Goldy

- Insufficient Therapy (1993)

with War & Peace

- Time Capsule (1993)
- The Flesh and Blood Sessions (1999)
- Light at the End of the Tunnel (2001)
- The Walls Have Eyes (2004)

with Dio

- Strange Highways (1993)
- Angry Machines (1996)
- Master of the Moon (2004)

with Munetaka Higuchi with Dream Castle

- Free World (1997)

with Steel Dragon

- Rock Star (Soundtrack, 2001)

with Underground Moon

- Underground Moon (2001)

with Lynch/Pilson

- Wicked Underground (2003)
- Heavy Hitters (2020)
- Heavy Hitters II (2023)

with Power Project

- Dinosaurs (2005)

with Benedictum

- Uncreation (2006) as bassist & producer

with Foreigner

- Extended Versions, aka Live In '05 (2006)
- No End in Sight: The Very Best of Foreigner (2008)
- Can't Slow Down (2009)
- Can't Slow Down...When It's Live! (2010)
- Acoustique: The Classics Unplugged (2011)
- Alive & Rockin' (2012)
- The Best of Foreigner 4 & More (2014)

with T&N

- Slave to the Empire (2012)

with Adler

- Back from the Dead (2012) as bassist & producer

with Starship

- Loveless Fascination (2013) as session bassist & producer

with Lynch Mob

- Rebel (2015)

with The End Machine

- The End Machine (2019)
- Phase2 (2021)

with Black Swan

- Shake the World (2020)
- Generation Mind (2022)
- Paralyzed (2026)
