= Dream Warriors (song) =

1987 single by Dokken

Single by Dokken

from the album Back for the Attack
- Released: February 18, 1987
- Recorded: December 1986
- Genre: Glam metal
- Length: 4:42
- Label: Elektra
- Songwriters: George Lynch and Jeff Pilson

Dokken singles chronology
"It's Not Love" (1986)	"Dream Warriors" (1987)	"Burning Like a Flame" (1987)

Music video
- "Dream Warriors" on YouTube

"Dream Warriors" is a song by American band Dokken, that was written by members George Lynch and Jeff Pilson for the movie A Nightmare on Elm Street 3: Dream Warriors. The song was released as a single in 1987, charting at number 22 on the Hot Mainstream Rock Tracks chart, and was also released on Dokken's fourth album, Back for the Attack, as the closing track to that album.

In 2015, "Sleazegrinder" of Louder included the song in his list of "The 20 Greatest Hair Metal Anthems Of All Time".

== Music video ==
The music video used clips from the movie A Nightmare on Elm Street 3: Dream Warriors, and primarily featured actress Patricia Arquette, and Robert Englund in the role of Freddy Krueger. The video featured various scenes from the film, combined with a small amount of original footage of Arquette's character Kristen Parker being menaced by Freddy Krueger before being rescued by Dokken who drives Freddy off with their own "dream power" of rock 'n' roll. At the end of the video Freddy wakes up in bed screaming revealing that the video was his nightmare and exclaims, "What a nightmare! Who were those guys?"

The video was ranked as the #1 "Killer '80s Heavy Metal Horror Movie Music [Video]" by VH1 in 2015.

== Track listing ==
In addition to "Dream Warriors," the single contained the songs "Back for the Attack" - a previously unreleased track from the Under Lock and Key album sessions, and "Paris Is Burning," from the album Breaking the Chains.

No.	Title	Length
1.	"Dream Warriors"	4:42
2.	"Back for the Attack"	3:51
3.	"Paris Is Burning"	3:37

== Charts ==
Chart (1987)	Peak position
US AOR Tracks (Radio & Records)	26
US Album Rock Tracks (Billboard)	22

== Legacy and cover versions ==
Don Dokken performed the song acoustically at the 30th anniversary event for A Nightmare on Elm Street 3.

In 2018, the song was covered in the episode "Chapter Thirty-Nine: The Midnight Club" from the third season of the television series Riverdale, performed by K.J. Apa, Ashleigh Murray, Camila Mendes and Lili Reinhart.

The song is used as the entrance music for the Saito Brothers in All Japan Pro Wrestling
