= In My Dreams (Dokken song) =

Single by Dokken

from the album Under Lock and Key
- Released: February 1986 (US)
- Genre: Glam metal
- Length: 4:18
- Label: Elektra
- Songwriters: Don Dokken; George Lynch; Jeff Pilson; Mick Brown
- Producers: Neil Kernon; Michael Wagener

Dokken singles chronology
"The Hunter" (1985)	"In My Dreams" (1986)	"It's Not Love" (1986)

Music video
- "In My Dreams" on YouTube

"In My Dreams" is a song by American heavy metal band Dokken, released in 1985 on the album Under Lock and Key. The song peaked at number 24 on the Hot Mainstream Rock Tracks chart and at number 77 on the Billboard Hot 100 in the United States.

== Track listing ==
7" single

Side A
No.	Title	Length
1.	"In My Dreams"	4:01

Side B
No.	Title	Length
1.	"Til the Livin' End"	3:56

EP single

No.	Title	Length
1.	"In My Dreams"	4:01
2.	"Til the Livin' End"	3:56
3.	"Alone Again"	4:30

== Charts ==
Chart (1986)	Peak position
US AOR Tracks (Radio & Records)	26
US Billboard Hot 100	77
US Top Rock Tracks (Billboard)	24

== Cover versions ==
The song was covered by teen-pop/dance band The Party, featuring lead vocals by Deedee Magno, and released as a single in 1991, peaking at #34 on the Billboard Hot 100.

== Personnel ==
- Don Dokken – lead vocals
- George Lynch – guitar
- Jeff Pilson – bass guitar, backing vocals
- Mick Brown – drums, backing vocals

== See also ==
- List of glam metal albums and songs
