= Dokken =

American heavy metal band

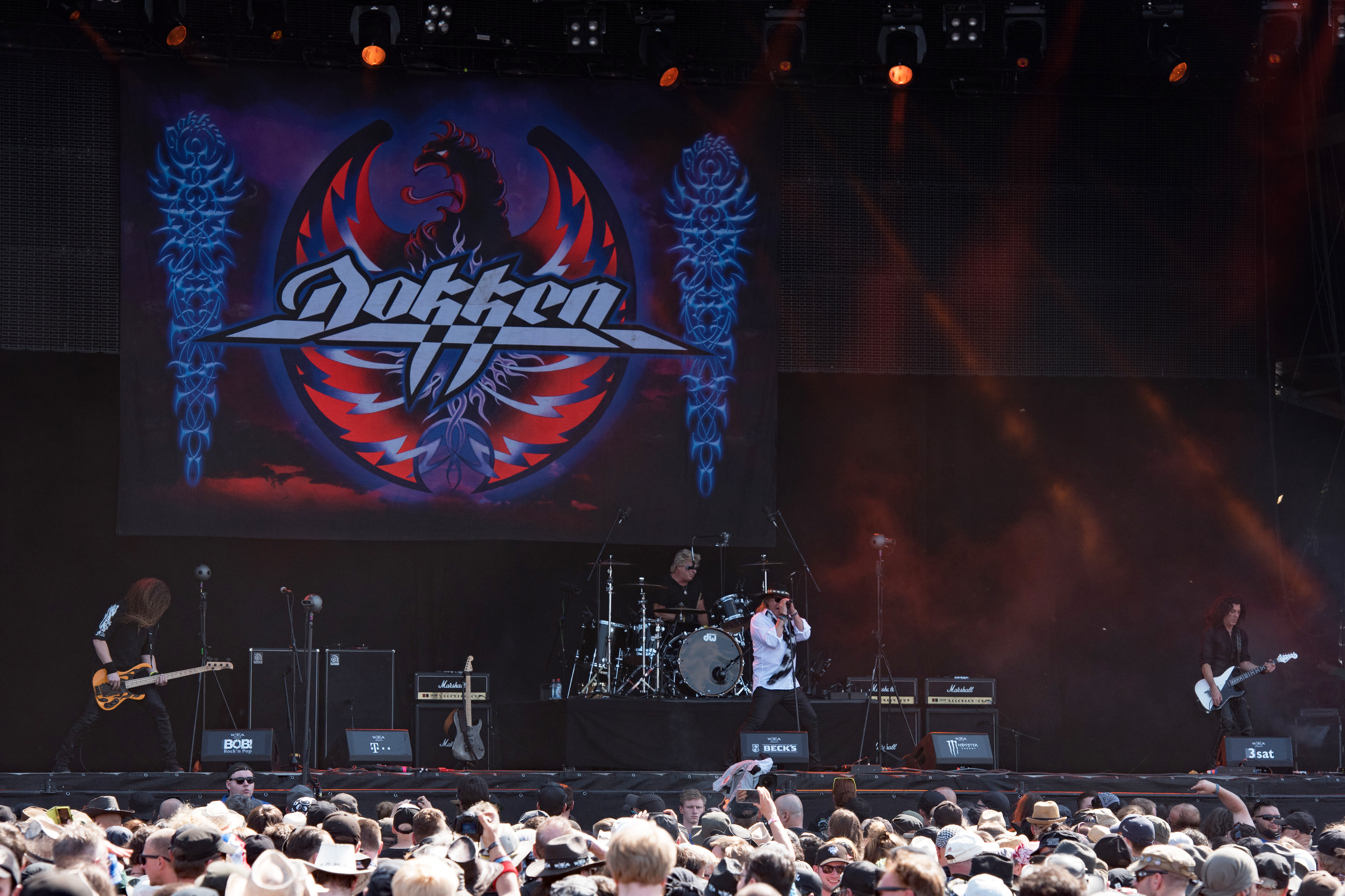
- Dokken performing at Wacken Open Air 2018

Background information
- Also known as: Airborne (1976–1978)
- Origin: Los Angeles, California, U.S.
- Genres: Glam metal; heavy metal; hard rock
- Works: Discography
- Years active: 1976–1989, 1993–present
- Labels: Elektra; Carrere; CMC; Frontiers; Deadline Music, a division of; Cleopatra Records; Sanctuary Records; BMG
- Spinoffs: Lynch Mob; Dokken/Lynch
- Members: Don Dokken; Jon Levin; Chris McCarvill; BJ Zampa
- Past members: Juan Croucier; Bobby Blotzer; Greg Pecka; Steven R. Barry; Gary Holland; Greg Leon; Gary Link; Peter Baltes; Kevin Burnes; Mick Brown; George Lynch; Warren DeMartini; Jeff Pilson; Reb Beach; John Norum; Barry Sparks; Alex De Rosso; Sean McNabb; Mark Boals
- Website: dokken.net

Dokken is an American heavy metal band formed in Los Angeles in 1978. It split up in 1989 and reformed four years later. The band has had several singles that charted on the Billboard Hot 100, such as "Alone Again", "In My Dreams", and "Burning Like a Flame", and has sold more than ten million albums worldwide. The live album Beast from the East was nominated for the inaugural Grammy Award for Best Metal Performance in 1989.

The classic Dokken line-up consisted of founder Don Dokken on vocals, George Lynch on lead guitar, Mick Brown on drums and Jeff Pilson, who replaced the Ratt-bound Juan Croucier in 1983, on bass; this line-up remained stable from 1983 to 1989, and again from 1993 to 1998, and briefly reunited in 2016. After several personnel changes on guitar, Dokken's attorney Jon Levin stepped in to fill the role in 2004. In 2001, Barry Sparks replaced Pilson on bass. In 2009, Sean McNabb (formerly of Great White and Quiet Riot) replaced him, and was then replaced by Chris McCarvill in 2015. As of Mick Brown's retirement from the band in July 2019, Don Dokken is the only remaining original band member. Brown's vacancy was filled by BJ Zampa of House of Lords fame.

In 2020, Jeff Mezydlo of Yardbarker included them in his list of "the 20 greatest hair metal bands of all time".

== Band history ==
=== Early years (1976–1984) ===
Don Dokken's first band formed in 1976, named Airborn. He played shows at clubs in the Los Angeles area, including the Starwood on Sunset Strip. Airborn included Bobby Blotzer on drums and Juan Croucier on bass, but Blotzer and Croucier left the band in 1978 to form FireFoxx. Don Dokken was unable to keep the Airborn name because another band named Airborne had already acquired a record deal. Bringing in Greg Pecka on drums and Steven R. Barry on bass, Dokken recorded a 7" single, "Hard Rock Woman" b/w "Broken Heart", released in 1979 under the band name Dokken, produced by Drake Levin, best known as the guitarist for Paul Revere & the Raiders.

A Dokken line-up consisting of Don, guitarist Greg Leon, drummer Gary Holland (both from the band Suite 19 which also once featured Mötley Crüe's Tommy Lee), and bassist Gary Link toured Germany in 1979 where the band met an up-and-coming producer named Michael Wagener, also the live sound engineer for Accept, who would follow Don back to Los Angeles for a short vacation, a move that became permanent shortly thereafter. The '79 touring line-up quickly fell apart with Leon taking over Randy Rhoads' spot in Quiet Riot and Holland joining Dante Fox, later known as Great White. A Michael Wagener-produced Hamburg recording of the '79 line-up surfaced in 1989 under the title Back in the Streets, released by the German label Repertoire Records without the band's consent. Dokken toured Germany again in 1980, this time with Croucier back on bass.

In early 1981, Don Dokken returned to Germany trying to get a record deal with a new band in tow, guitarist George Lynch and drummer Mick Brown, who had been playing in the band Xciter at the time, with Croucier remaining on bass. After recording demos with Wagener and with the help of Accept's manager, Gaby Hauke, a deal was secured with Carrere Records. Recorded between July and September 1981 at Studio Stommeln with Wagener and Dieter Dierks, Breaking the Chains was initially released under the name "Don Dokken" before it was changed to simply Dokken on subsequent pressings. While in Germany, Don would also demo songs with the Scorpions for their Blackout album as the band's vocalist Klaus Meine was forced to undergo surgery on his vocal cords and his return was uncertain for a time. Dokken did eventually perform backing vocals on the album. Meanwhile, Lynch, Brown and Croucier ended up working as studio musicians for German singer Udo Lindenberg on his 1982 album Keule, playing on four songs: "Urmensch (Prehistoric man)", "Ratten (Rats)" (both co-written by Lynch, Brown and Lindenberg), "Zwischen Rhein Und Aufruhr (Between the Rhine and the uproar)", and "Gesetz (Law)". Promotional activities for the European release of Breaking the Chains included a German TV appearance as Dokken performed a 40-minute live set on the Beat-Club as part of a Musikladen Extra which aired on January 4, 1982.

Back in the United States, Dokken were now managed by Cliff Bernstein who got the band signed to Elektra Records for a stateside release of Breaking The Chains, remixed for the American market. Dokken played a couple of shows with Warren DeMartini on guitar when George Lynch briefly left to rehearse with Ozzy Osbourne's band while on tour. The band did an arena tour in the U.S. with Lynch back on guitar supporting Blue Öyster Cult in 1983, but when the tour was over the band was left with little money and was nearly dropped from the label due to the album's lack of success.

While the band was very popular in Europe during this time they had not yet made commercial progress in the US. Juan Croucier left Dokken in 1983 just prior to the release of the "Breaking the Chains" video to join Ratt alongside DeMartini. Croucier was replaced by Jeff Pilson, who joined in time to film the video (without having played the song) and began writing songs with the band. Guitarist George Lynch quit and rejoined multiple times, ultimately remaining in the band as it moved forward.

=== Commercial success (1984–1988) ===
The album Tooth and Nail was released on September 13, 1984. The album contained several hit songs including "Just Got Lucky", "Alone Again", and "Into the Fire", and sold over one million copies in the US alone, peaking at No. 49, while selling another estimated one million copies worldwide. On November 22, 1985, the band's third album Under Lock and Key was released. It also sold over one million copies with the singles "In My Dreams" (No. 24), "The Hunter" (No. 25) and "It's Not Love". During this time in the 1980s, Dokken opened for such bands as Judas Priest, AC/DC, Aerosmith, Dio and Kiss, among others. The 1986 documentary short Heavy Metal Parking Lot features fans of Dokken and Judas Priest tailgating before a concert in Maryland.

Following a successful tour with Scorpions, Dokken returned to the studio in December 1986 to record "Dream Warriors", a song for the movie soundtrack A Nightmare on Elm Street 3: Dream Warriors. The track brought the band to the attention of many UK hard rock fans. The song was released as a single ("Dream Warriors" / "Back for the Attack") on February 10, 1987. After this release, the band took nearly six months off before recording Back for the Attack. The album was released on November 27, 1987, with the singles "Burning Like a Flame" (No. 20), "Heaven Sent" and "Prisoner" (No. 37) making the album the band's most successful release, reaching No. 13 on U.S. charts. It also included a remixed version of the single "Dream Warriors" (No. 22), and the accompanying music video featured band members interacting with the film's characters. Back for the Attack became Dokken's third record to reach platinum status.

After releasing Back for the Attack, the band toured as part of the Monsters of Rock Tour 1988 festival in the summer of 1988 along with Van Halen, Scorpions, Metallica, and Kingdom Come. Recordings from their April 1988 tour in Japan led to the release of live album Beast from the East on November 16, 1988, which went Gold in the United States and charted at No. 33. The album scored one studio single, titled "Walk Away" and a music video was made for it.

=== Split (1989–1993) ===
Dokken broke up in March 1989, due to creative and personal differences between Don Dokken and George Lynch as well as Don's desire to fire the rest of the band and hire new members before they signed their next record deal. Lynch and Brown then formed the band Lynch Mob and recorded two albums: Wicked Sensation in 1990 and Lynch Mob in 1992. Don Dokken also recorded Up from the Ashes in 1990.

Bassist Jeff Pilson, switching to lead vocals and guitar, formed Flesh & Blood in 1989 and recorded a five-song demo. Further recordings under the name War & Peace surfaced as Time Capsule in 1993, by which time the group had already disbanded. Pilson joined the McAuley Schenker Group for their 1991 album, M.S.G.. Afterwards, Pilson signed on with Dio for the Strange Highways album, reuniting with former Flesh & Blood bandmate Vinny Appice.

Lynch's first solo effort, 1993's Sacred Groove, reunited him with Don Dokken for the writing of the track "We Don't Own This World." Don Dokken was also supposed to sing lead on the track, however at the last moment, Don was unable to attend the studio session and was replaced by Matthew and Gunnar Nelson. Jeff Pilson also collaborated with Lynch on the album, co-writing the lyrics to "Flesh and Blood" and playing bass on "We Don't Own This World".

=== Reformation (1993–1997) ===
After releasing Up from the Ashes in 1990, Don Dokken wrote another solo album in 1993. Titled Dysfunctional, the album was recorded and produced in Don's studio. However, when John Kalodner wanted to sign him for the album, he suggested that George Lynch be brought back into the band so that the album could be marketed as a Dokken album, and not another Don Dokken solo effort. Despite the fact that the tension between Lynch and Don Dokken was the cause of the band's 1989 split, the two agreed to put their problems behind them for the time being. The band re-united in 1994 along with Mick Brown and Jeff Pilson, with Lynch re-writing and re-recording the guitar solos on the album, which were originally conceived by Don. Dokken was signed with Columbia Records and the album managed to sell 300,000 copies despite the decline in popularity of similar bands during this time.

During the tour supporting Dysfunctional, old tensions between George and Don had resurfaced and the band began to split apart. During a Columbia promotion for the new album in which the band was scheduled to play live on 120 radio stations, Lynch unexpectedly left the studio and refused to re-enter. The record company was forced to air the rehearsal tape that had been recorded earlier and four days later the label dropped Dokken, presumably because of this and other similar incidents involving Lynch's behavior. One Live Night, a live acoustic album, was released in 1996 by a new label, CMC International, and was followed with Shadowlife in 1997. Don Dokken was dissatisfied with Shadowlife, an album in which Lynch took total control and even went as far as to replace the original Dokken logo on the album. Don alleges that Lynch intended to destroy the band with this album, reciting the following quote from him in an interview: "This is the perfect record. This is gonna be the end of Dokken, and that is what I wanted to accomplish."

=== Line up changes (1997–2008) ===
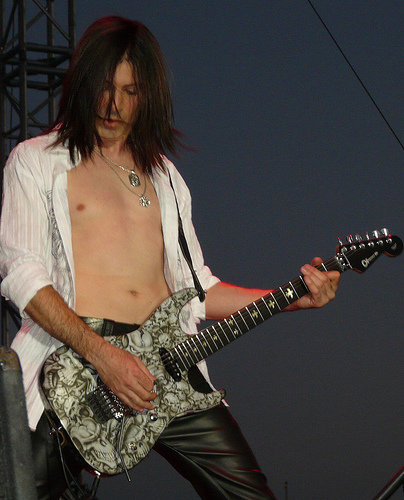
Jon Levin live with Dokken on June 21, 2008

In late 1997, the band fired Lynch. Needing a guitarist, Dokken looked to Europe guitarist John Norum who had previously played on his 1990 solo album and was familiar with the band's catalog, to help him finish the tour. Lynch tried to re-join the group just days before the tour began, but was told that he was "out" by the rest of the group. A lawsuit followed in which Lynch sued the band for $1 million, but the band prevailed in the verdict. After the European tour, John Norum was unable to continue as he had previously committed to a solo record. The band then hired former Winger guitarist Reb Beach, and recorded in 1999 Erase the Slate. Dokken released another live album titled Live from the Sun in 2000 before the departure of Beach. Beach, who wanted to work on some other projects and could not commit to Dokken long term, was replaced by John Norum, who was now in between projects and able to participate in the band's touring schedule. Bassist Jeff Pilson also left the band, joining Foreigner, and was replaced by Barry Sparks. In a 2004 interview, Don Dokken stated that Jeff left because "he wanted to do something different and didn't want to keep playing these songs over and over again."

Of the original members, only Dokken and Mick Brown remained. This line-up released the album Long Way Home, but Norum suffered a hand injury during the band's early-2002 tour of Europe and had to be replaced by former Dark Lord guitarist Alex De Rosso. That same year, Dokken was featured in the Metal Edge Rock Fest tour along with Ratt, FireHouse, and other similar acts. In the spring of 2003, Dokken embarked on an extensive tour of the United States, opening for Scorpions and Whitesnake. After the tour, guitarist Alex De Rosso lost his visa and had to return to Italy, at which point Don Dokken called Jon Levin, who formerly played guitar on Doro's Force Majeure, and also had previously met with the band and played a single show in 1998. Levin joined the band, and the line-up of Dokken, Brown, Levin, and Sparks would remain through 2008. Dokken released Hell to Pay in 2004. The band continued extensive touring in 2005 and 2006. 2007 saw the release of both a live CD and a compilation DVD. The CD, titled From Conception: Live 1981, is a previously unreleased live recording from the band's early years which Don discovered in their master vault. The DVD release titled Unchain the Night was first released on VHS in 1986 and is a compilation of the band's music videos along with interviews and other footage. The band also performed at the hard rock and metal festival Rocklahoma in both 2007 and 2008.

=== Brief reunion (2008–2010) ===
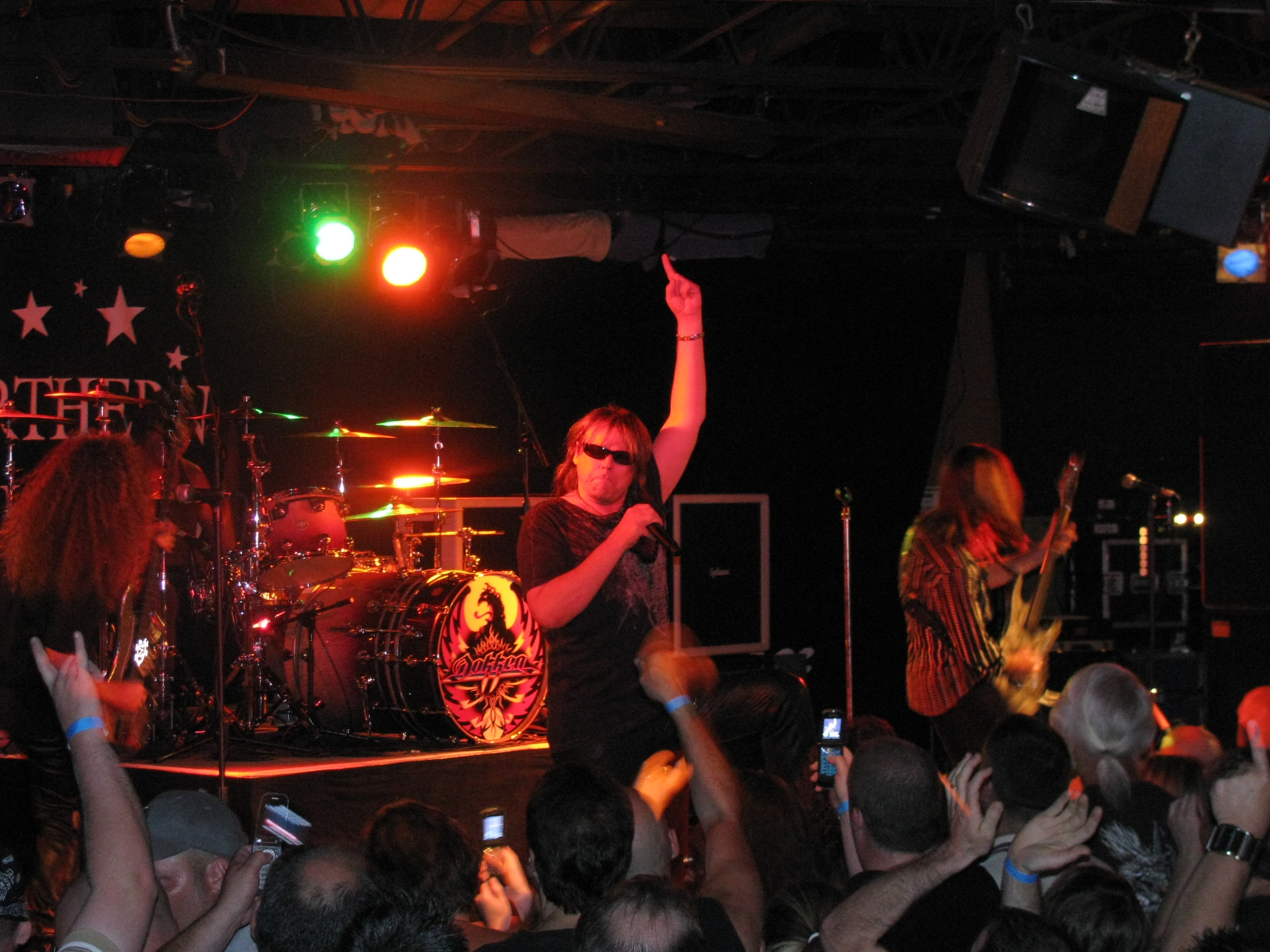
Dokken at Northern Lights in Clifton Park, New York, August 5, 2008

On May 13, 2008, Dokken released their first studio album in four years titled Lightning Strikes Again, which became the band's highest-charting album in thirteen years, debuting at No. 133 in the United States. The album was a return to the band's signature sound and the songs follow the classic Dokken formula. Don Dokken told interviewers that Jon Levin was the bandmate who wanted the band to make an album with the classic sound in mind, and remarked that the process was difficult, saying: "I had to get back in that mindset. This is what the fans wanted, and if I stay focused on that I would give them a straight-ahead Dokken record." During the spring and summer of 2008 in order to promote the new Dokken album, Don Dokken and Jon Levin participated in dozens of interviews including Rockline, KNAC, The Classic Metal Show, as well as a series of podcasts available on the band's website.

During the summer of 2008, the band toured with Sebastian Bach and Poison. Sparks and Brown were not part of the summer 2008 touring line-up. Brown signed on to play with Ted Nugent for the summer before Dokken was offered the slot on the Poison tour, making him unable to tour in support of Lightning Strikes Again. Jeff Martin of Racer X and Badlands played drums for the 2008 tour until he was fired by Don Dokken. Chris McCarvill's House of Lords bandmate B.J. Zampa filled in as drummer for the remainder of the tour. Sparks was in Asia performing with a stadium act and was unable to tour with Dokken until he was able to get a visa for his wife; Chris McCarvill from House of Lords played bass.

On November 29, 2009 during an encore at a Dokken show at The House of Blues in Anaheim, George Lynch and Jeff Pilson joined Mick Brown and Don Dokken for two songs, the first time they were on stage together in twelve years. In 2010, the band opened for the Scorpions on select dates of their US tour.

On March 1, 2010 Dokken digitally released Greatest Hits, a collection of re-recorded songs from their 1980s albums with two new tracks, to iTunes and Amazon.com. The physical album with additional tracks was released In Japan on King Records on April 21, 2010 and is available in the United States through Cleopatra Records.

In early 2010 Lynch announced a reunion of Dokken's "classic" line-up, though the announcement was followed by a retraction on February 24. In May 2010 Lynch and Don Dokken appeared together as guests on Season 5, Episode 7 of television show That Metal Show. In the episode they claimed that the main cause of their rift was a publicity stunt that they both eventually started to believe. Lynch added that Don also wanting to "take all the money and all the credit" did not help, with Don nodding during the statement. They both also mentioned that they would love to have a reunion with Don, Lynch, Pilson, and Brown, but that they are all too busy with other projects in 2010 (between Dokken's current lineup, Lynch Mob, Pilson's involvement with Foreigner). Dokken and Lynch Mob toured through the summer and fall of 2010.

On December 8, 2010, Lynch announced on his web site and in interviews earlier that a Dokken reunion will not be happening. Lynch stated:

We feel it's important to let folks know there will be no Dokken reunion in the foreseeable future, if ever. This is Don's decision, despite Jeff's and my best intentions and efforts over the past few years to make this happen in good faith. My apologies to VH1, Eddie Trunk, Steve Strange and all the fans who were pulling for this to happen.

=== Broken Bones (2011–2015) ===
Dokken planned to release a new studio album in the fall 2012, with recording planned to finish by February and release before the band went on tour in June. The album would be released worldwide on Frontiers Records, which announced the signing of Dokken on November 22, 2011. Don Dokken announced the title of the new album to be Broken Bones and said the release date should be sometime in November 2012. They brought in session drummer Jimmy DeGrasso as Mick Brown couldn't record due to scheduling conflicts which made this the first album he didn't appear on in Dokken, although Brown has stated in interviews that Don simply didn't want to pay to fly him in for the sessions. The album was released on September 25, 2012. In November 2014, Sean McNabb was replaced by one-time Ted Nugent bassist (and perennial lead singer of Yngwie Malmsteen's Rising Force) Mark Boals.

It was revealed in June 2015 that Dokken would be part of the Rockingham lineup at Nottingham's Rock City October 23–25. Dokken headlined on the Sunday, following Giuffria on stage. Other acts scheduled for that Sunday included Royal Hunt and Stan Bush.

=== Reunion shows with classic lineup and Heaven Comes Down (2016–present) ===
Don Dokken announced that he would be reuniting with George Lynch, Mick Brown and Jeff Pilson to perform several shows in Japan at the end of October 2016 and one US show at the end of September. In an interview with L.A. Weekly on March 6, 2017, Don Dokken said he is not planning any further appearances with Pilson and Lynch, stating that the Japan shows were "a one-time thing." Despite this, the classic Dokken lineup recorded their first song together in over twenty years "It's Just Another Day"; it can be found on the live album Return to the East Live (2016), which was released on April 20, 2018.

In July 2017, Jon Levin said that the band was planning to enter the studio in the fall after touring to begin work on the next studio album for a 2018 release, which did not appear. Guitarist Ira Black filled in for Jon Levin on the latter half of the band's 2017 tour. In July 2019, longtime drummer Mick Brown announced his retirement from Dokken after forty years with the band, citing the toll of constant touring and feeling that he had grown too old for the demands of the road. His spot was later taken by BJ Zampa, also of House of Lords, alongside bassist Chris McCarvill.

Dokken released an album called The Lost Songs: 1978-1981 on August 28, 2020 via Silver Lining Music.

An album collection package titled The Elektra Albums 1983-1987 was released on January 27, 2023, featuring the first four studio albums from the band's career. The twelfth studio album Heaven Comes Down was released on October 27, 2023. A music video of the first single titled "Fugitive" was released on August 8, 2023.

In an interview with Cassius Morris in April 2025, Don Dokken hinted at retirement and thoughts of playing a final Dokken show within the next year. He also discussed a possibility of doing a final EP with guitarist George Lynch.

== Musical style ==
Dokken's style is heavy metal and hard rock. They are known for their strong use of melody in their songwriting. Lead singer Don Dokken's vocal range spans multiple octaves. AllMusic stated that guitarist George Lynch was "virtuosous" in his guitar playing ability. The site said the band's style after returning from hiatus was "darker, more complex, but no less melodic."

== Guest appearances and cultural references ==
Members and former members of the band have appeared on various tribute albums.

- George Lynch played guitar on the song "Anthem" on a tribute album to Rush.
- George Lynch and Jeff Pilson have appeared on tribute albums to Iron Maiden.
- Jeff Pilson appeared as the bassist for Steel Dragon in the film Rock Star (starring Mark Wahlberg and Jennifer Aniston) which was loosely based on the history of Judas Priest.
- They also appeared in Dio's Hear 'n Aid in the 1980s, and were featured prominently in the music video.
- In the mid-1980s Don Dokken sang lead vocals on the hit single for former Scorpions drummer Herman Rarebell's solo project Herman Ze German and Friends. The song is a power ballad titled "I'll Say Goodbye". Don also sang lead vocals on the songs "Hard Sensation" and "Destiny".
- Dokken's song "Breaking the Chains" was featured in the video game Grand Theft Auto: Vice City Stories on the V-Rock radio station.
- A cover of "In my dreams" by the teen-pop/dance group The Party released as a single in 1991, reached at #34 on the Billboard Hot 100.
- In 2009, Dokken appeared in a series of commercials for Symantec's Norton Internet Security 2010. The advertisements imagine a computer as a chicken and Dokken as a malicious computer virus. Each ad features a different outcome, based on whether or not the "Dokken Virus" was allowed into the system.
- Dokken's song "Dream Warriors" appeared in the movie A Nightmare on Elm Street 3: Dream Warriors.
- A cover version of "Dream Warriors" is featured in Riverdale's episode "The Midnight Club".
- In 2012, Aesop Rock released an album titled Skelethon, on which he has a song titled "Dokken Rules", only appearing on the Deluxe Edition.
- On Munetaka Higuchi's (late drummer from Loudness) 1997 solo album, Dream Castle, Jeff Pilson played bass on the tracks, "What Cost War" (sung by Ronnie James Dio) and "Free World". Don Dokken sang lead vocals on "Tell Me True", a cover of an old Talas song. Talas' founding member, Billy Sheehan, played bass on this and several other tracks on the album.
- Dokken's "Into the Fire" was used as the theme song for the first 2 seasons of professional wrestling show NWA Power, and was the namesake of the NWA's first exclusively produced pay-per-view event since becoming a singular wrestling promotion held on December 14, 2019.
- The band is listed as an opening act for Motley Crue during a cutaway scene from the movie "The Dirt" (2019).
- Jeff Pilson voiced Johnny Cage in Mortal Kombat (2011).

== Band members ==
Current members

- Don Dokken – lead vocals, rhythm guitar (1976–1989, 1993–present)
- Jon Levin – lead guitar (2003–present)
- Chris McCarvill – bass, backing vocals (2015–present)
- Bill "BJ" Zampa – drums, backing vocals (2019–present; touring 2008–2010)

Touring guests

- George Lynch – lead guitar (1981–1982, 1983–1989, 1994–1997; reunions in 2016, 2020–present)

== Discography ==
=== Studio albums ===
- Breakin' the Chains (1981) (credited to Don Dokken)
- Breaking the Chains (1983) (rerecording)
- Tooth and Nail (1984)
- Under Lock and Key (1985)
- Back for the Attack (1987)
- Dysfunctional (1995)
- Shadowlife (1997)
- Erase the Slate (1999)
- Long Way Home (2002)
- Hell to Pay (2004)
- Lightning Strikes Again (2008)
- Broken Bones (2012)
- Heaven Comes Down (2023)
