= Mick Brown (musician) =

American drummer

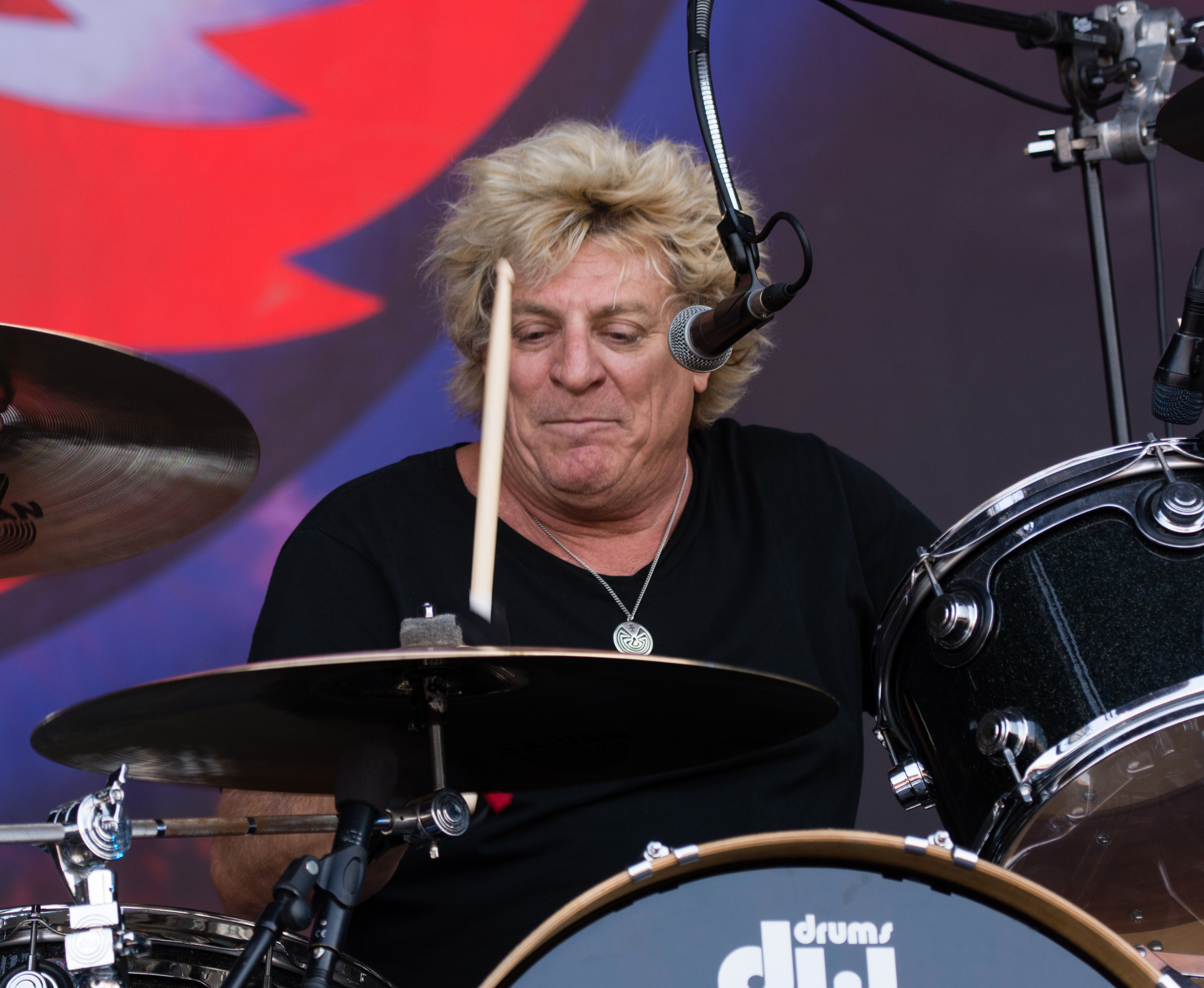
- Brown performing with Dokken in 2018

Background information
- Also known as: "Wild" Mick Brown
- Born: Michael J. Brown; September 8, 1956 (age 69); San Mateo County, California, United States
- Origin: Los Angeles, California, U.S.
- Genres: Glam metal, hard rock, heavy metal
- Occupation: Drummer
- Years active: 1975–2019

Michael J. Brown (born September 8, 1956), also known as "Wild" Mick Brown, is an American retired drummer who played in the rock bands Dokken, Lynch Mob, The End Machine, and Xciter, as well as in Ted Nugent's band.

== Early life ==
Brown was born in San Mateo County, California, on September 8, 1956, and began playing drums at age eight when on his birthday he took his first drum lesson from Mickey Hart (who three years later joined The Grateful Dead).

== Career ==
=== Dokken ===
Brown joined Dokken in 1981. He replaced Gary Holland, who left Dokken to join Dante Fox and later Great White. Before that, Brown played drums in The Boyz (1975–1977) and then in Xciter (1977–1981). Both bands also featured future Dokken bandmate George Lynch. He sang vocals on the track "Tooth and Nail" on Dokken's live acoustic album One Live Night, released in 1995 Apart from Don Dokken, Brown was the only person to appear on every Dokken album. He is credited on Broken Bones, but Jimmy Degrasso played on the record, not Brown. In July 2019, Brown said he was taking a break from touring and playing live.

=== Ted Nugent ===
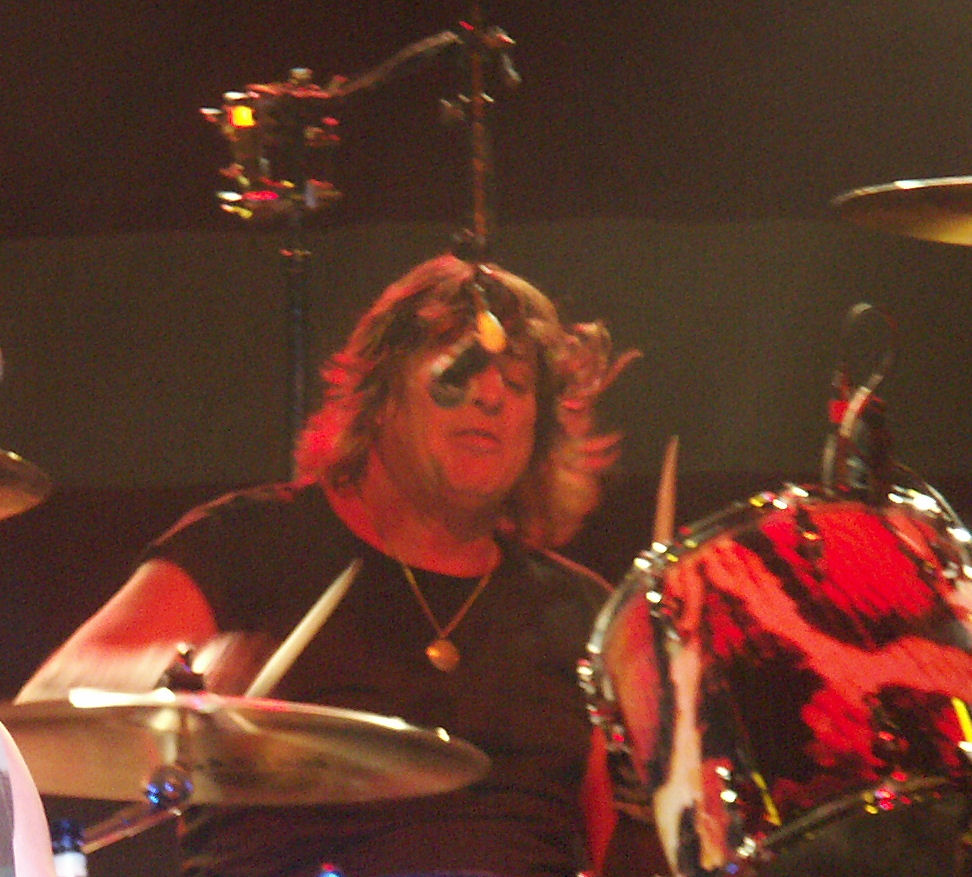
Brown drumming for Ted Nugent in 2007

Around 2003, in a conversation with Ted Nugent, former Nugent lighting designer Will Twork mentioned that Brown would be the perfect addition to Nugent's band after Nugent had heard about Brown from then-bass player Barry Sparks. Twork had worked with Brown on the first Lynch Mob tour, as well as on the 1995 Dokken "Reunion Tour" in Japan. "Mick is an awesome drummer and personality and perfect for Nugent", said Twork in 2015. In 2006, Brown played drums for Nugent on Nugent's Unleash the Beast Tour, and in 2013 Brown played drums for Nugent on Nugent's Mid-West Rock-n-Roll Express 2013 Tour.

=== Tooth and Nail / T&N ===
Brown is also a member of Tooth and Nail, a band that features classic-era Dokken members George Lynch and Jeff Pilson. Their debut album Slave to the Empire was released in October 2012. The band has also been renamed T&N.

Brown also had a solo band called The Bourbon Ballet with lead singer Scott Hammons from the band Tunnel.

== Arrest ==
On July 8, 2012, Brown was arrested in Bangor, Maine, after he reportedly stole a golf cart and drove it down a Bangor street drunk, after performing with Ted Nugent at the Bangor Waterfront Pavilion. He was charged with driving under the influence (DUI), reckless driving, theft, and assault. He was released on $4,000 bail and was due back in court on August 15, 2012. Having initially pleaded not guilty, on November 13 of that year he pleaded guilty to DUI with the other charges being dropped, was fined $1,000 and banned from driving for 90 days.

== Discography ==
- See Dokken discography
