= REvolution =

Studio album by Lynch Mob
- Released: April 29, 2003
- Genres: Heavy metal, hard rock
- Length: 60:33
- Label: Deadline Music
- Producer: George Lynch

Lynch Mob chronology
Evil: Live (2003)	REvolution (2003)	REvolution: Live! (2006)

Professional ratings
Review scores
Source	Rating
AllMusic	4/5 stars

REvolution is the fourth studio album by American rock band Lynch Mob, released in 2003. This album marks the return of vocalist Robert Mason and bassist Anthony Esposito to the band. The tracks of the album are re-worked versions of the band's first three albums, and Dokken songs of the George Lynch-era of the band.

== Track listing ==
No.	Title	original on album	Length
1.	"Tooth and Nail"	Tooth and Nail	3:27
2.	"Tangled in the Web"	Lynch Mob	4:01
3.	"All I Want"	Wicked Sensation	5:15
4.	"Kiss of Death"	Back for the Attack	6:02
5.	"She's Evil but She's Mine"	Wicked Sensation	5:22
6.	"Relax"	Smoke This	4:34
7.	"Cold Is the Heart"	Lynch Mob	5:06
8.	"Breaking the Chains"	Breaking the Chains	3:35
9.	"When Darkness Calls"	Lynch Mob	5:55
10.	"River of Love"	Wicked Sensation	4:14
11.	"Wicked Sensation"	Wicked Sensation	4:48
12.	"Paris Is Burning"	Breaking the Chains	3:35
13.	"The Secret"	Lynch Mob	4:29

== Personnel ==
- Robert Mason – vocals
- George Lynch – guitars
- Anthony Esposito – bass
- Michael Frowein – drums

Additional personnel

- Eunah Lee – graphic design
- Jason Myers – art direction
