= Brides of Destruction =

American hard rock band (2002–2006)

- Also known as: Cockstar, Motordog
- Origin: Los Angeles, California, U.S.
- Genres: Hard rock, glam metal, post-grunge
- Years active: 2002–2006
- Labels: Sanctuary, Shrapnel, Universal
- Past members: Tracii Guns; London LeGrand; Nikki Sixx; Kris Kohls; Adam Hamilton; John Corabi; Scot Coogan; Scott Sorry; Ginger Wildheart

Brides of Destruction was an American hard rock supergroup from Los Angeles, California, formed in 2002. The band's last lineup consisted of singer London LeGrand (vocals), Tracii Guns (lead guitar) and Scot Coogan (drums, percussion). Previous members of the band were Nikki Sixx (bass), Kris Kohls (drums), Adam Hamilton (keyboard), John Corabi (rhythm guitar), Scott Sorry (bass) and Ginger (rhythm guitar).

Nikki Sixx formed Brides of Destruction with L.A. Guns guitarist Tracii Guns, initially with the name Cockstar, after Mötley Crüe went on hiatus in 2001. Added to the lineup were Adema drummer Kris Kohls, L.A. Guns bassist Adam Hamilton, who played keyboard in the band, and singer London LeGrand. Hamilton was soon replaced by former Mötley Crüe singer and guitarist John Corabi while Guns left L.A. Guns to focus on the band. They briefly adopted the moniker Motordog before settling on Brides of Destruction before recording demos. The name was suggested to Sixx by industry friend and photographer, Dano Panariello. By 2003, both Corabi and Kohls departed the band, with former Annetenna and Ednaswap Scot Coogan replacing Kohls.

Sixx returned to Mötley Crüe for a reunion tour in 2005 with Brides of Destruction to be put on hiatus. However, the band continued with former Amen bassist Scott Sorry replacing Sixx while Ginger, of The Wildhearts, was added as the band's second guitarist. Ginger's tenure with the band last for over two months while Sorry departed the group prior to their European tour.

Following the formation of The Tracii Guns Band (which later became the second L.A. Guns), Brides of Destruction disbanded in 2006. To date, Brides of Destruction have released two studio albums; Here Come the Brides (2004) and Runaway Brides (2005).

== History ==
=== Formation and Here Come the Brides (2002–2004) ===
When Mötley Crüe went on hiatus in 2001, Nikki Sixx began working on a new project with L.A. Guns guitarist Tracii Guns, under the name Cockstar, in Los Angeles, California, in 2002. Initially, it was rumored that Sixx was working with friend and former Guns N' Roses guitarist Slash as well as Josh Todd of Buckcherry. However, Sixx stated that, while he and Slash had considered working together, they had different ideas for a band:

'Well, Slash and I are friends and we had talked. We'd considered doing this project together, but he had a different vision for what he wanted to do. He really wanted to work with Duff [McKagan], Izzy [Stradlin] and Matt [Sorum], and that's very comfortable to him. That's important. So, that didn't happen with us, but then Brides of Destruction happened, obviously, with Tracii and I think it's good. I kind of like to think that it's a real healthy competitiveness.'

They soon added singer London LeGrand, Adema drummer Kris Kohls and L.A. Guns bassist Adam Hamilton, as keyboardist, to the band while former Beautiful Creatures guitarist DJ Ashba was invited to join. However, Ashba declined to focus on his own solo project. Hamilton soon left and was replaced by former Mötley Crüe singer and guitarist John Corabi, added as the band's second guitarist, while Guns left L.A. Guns to focus on Cockstar. They were advised by radio programmers that the name Cockstar wouldn't be announced on air, briefly using the moniker Motordog. They soon adopted Brides of Destruction, suggested by a radio industry friend of Sixx, photographer Dano Panariello with Sixx stating that "[i]t sounds a little bit different. It kinda makes sense, it kinda doesn't make sense. Kinda like [the band]." They soon recorded and demoed new material.

Kohls departed the band towards and the end of the year and was replaced by Ednaswap and Annetenna drummer Scot Coogan. The band played their first show opening for Mudvayne and Taproot on December 14, 2002 at the Ventura Theatre in California. In 2003, Corabi also left the band In a 2005 interview, Corabi cited some tension with Guns and little writing input contributing to his decision to leave:

'To be perfectly honest with you, I get along with Nikki [Sixx] splendidly, but when I left the band I told Nikki that there was gonna be some egos involved, I don't wanna say who, but I just said there's a member in this band that I just do not get along with, that I do not write well with. First of all they basically told me that they don't need me to write at all, so I was like I'm not into that situation, and I told Nikki "Dude, I love you to death. I known that you and I can write a great record and so I'm out.". And as it turned out he just sent Bruce [Kulick] an email like a week ago and said "Tell Corabi I'm really sorry about the Brides of Destruction thing and he was right." Because Nikki is having an issue now with the person that I was having an issue with… So we'll just leave it at that.'

Brides of Destruction remained largely inactive throughout 2003 before recording their debut album with producer Stevo Bruno. The album featured additional guitars by Corabi, recorded prior to his departure, as well as additional drums by Kohls. James Michael, Justin Nichols and Kevin Kadish all have co-writing credits while the album was mixed by Steve Thompson. With only a label for a Japanese release, Universal Records, the band were on the verge of disbanding. However, they soon signed a deal with Sanctuary Records, with their album released in Japan in December of the same year.

Here Come the Brides was released on March 9, 2004 in the US peaking at number 92 on both the Billboard 200 and Top Internet Albums chart. Here Come the Brides sold 13,000 copies in the first week while "Shut the Fuck Up" was chosen as the first single. The album received generally positive reviews with Johnny Loftus, of AllMusic describing the album as "[b]y-the-numbers Los Angeles metal with slight post-grunge updates" and that the "collaboration between Sixx and Guns should make Here Come the Brides noteworthy to their fans."

A summer tour of the US, Europe, including an appearance at Download Festival in the United Kingdom and Australia followed.

=== Nikki Sixx departs, Runaway Brides and Hiatus (2004–2006) ===
Sixx soon announced that he was to return to Mötley Crüe for a reunion tour with Brides of Destruction to go on hiatus. Guns, initially, was going to form a new band with his remaining bandmates, while he also offered his services to Axl Rose in a bid to re-join Guns N' Roses. However, by 2005, Guns decided to continue without Sixx, adding former Amen bassist Scott Sorry as his replacement while Ginger, of The Wildhearts, was added as the band's second guitarist. They soon began writing new material. However, Ginger soon departed the band:

'When I realized that I wasn't gonna really be able to put 100 percent into that, I figured it would be fair to tell them sooner rather than later that I wasn't gonna be able to do it. I don't believe in messing people about, so I told the guys. I mean, they were gonna get me a work visa, and they were gonna pay me for shows and stuff… I just figured I'm not gonna take a penny if I'm not gonna last the duration — I believe in being straight with people. . . It's important to salvage friendships, especially in the face of adversity in the shape of money and music — I don't wanna lose friendships because of money or music. So I decided that I'd rather be these guys' friend forever than start an album that I wasn't gonna finish, or start a tour that I wasn't gonna finish [...] This is as fair as it could possibly be. And bad news isn't gonna feel good whenever you find it out, so it's best to find it out sooner rather than later.'

Brides of Destruction recorded their second album, with the tentative title of 13 Acres, with producer Andy Johns. Former members Nikki Sixx and Ginger have co-writing credits on the album while Guns also co-produced the album. They soon signed a deal with Shrapnel Records releasing Runaway Brides on September 13 in Europe and September 27 in the US. The album included the song "Dimes in Heaven" which was written as a tribute to recently deceased Pantera and Damageplan guitarist Dimebag Darrell.

The band toured in support, including a tour of Europe. Prior to the tour of Europe, Sorry departed the band with Jeremy Guns added to the touring lineup. Following the tour, Guns put Brides of Destruction on hiatus, going on to have a brief stint in Quiet Riot before forming The Tracii Guns Band (which later became the second L.A. Guns).

=== Post-hiatus (2006–present) ===
In the years following the hiatus. LeGrand formed Souls of We with George Lynch, releasing the album Let the Truth Be Known in 2008. He also formed side-project Rockstars on Mars. In an Interview on November 24, 2008, LeGrand admitted he would like to see a Brides of Destruction reunion, but with Nikki Sixx back in the band:

'It would be amazing. I don't know. In order to really give 110% to the fans, and they deserve it, we would need to have Nikki in the band. He is a huge part of the group. I think Nikki feels the same way. All of us from those days have had time to think. We realize that we were at different parts of our lives and that isn't who we necessarily are now. Maybe it makes us realize how much we should have appreciated it. I know that if the Brides got together at this point in my life we would have been a closer band. The communication would also have been better. The songs would have been a lot better. I would love for it to get back together. I am not sure it will, but I know that my phone number is the same and if anyone wants to give me a call, I would love to hear their voice.'

LeGrand also made a guest appearance on The 69 Eyes album Back in Blood released August 28, 2009.

Former bass player Scott Sorry joined former bandmate Ginger in new lineup of The Wildhearts in 2007 while he formed Sorry and the Sinatras, with members of Trashlight Vision, in 2008. They released their debut album Highball Roller on May 11, 2009.

In a 2016 interview with KNAC, Tracii Guns stated that if the band had put out a second a single and Sixx was still a member, Brides of Destruction would have had a "fair chance" in the music industry.

Scot Coogan toured with Stephen Pearcy in Rat Bastards while he also performs in a Led Zeppelin and The Beatles cover band Six Foot Nurse. In 2007, he joined Ace Frehley's touring band while he also recorded drums on Frehley's solo album Anomaly, released in 2009. In 2008 he toured Australia as the drummer for Lynch Mob.

Tracii Guns' L.A. Guns signed a deal with Steve Vai's label, Favored Nations, for a "Deluxe Reissue" of Shrinking Violet, released in Summer 2010.

In 2016, LeGrand launched a new band named 'Brides of Destruction Göteborg'.

== Members ==
- Tracii Guns – lead guitar, backing vocals (2002–2006), rhythm guitar (2003–2005, 2005–2006)
- London LeGrand – lead vocals (2002–2006)
- Nikki Sixx – bass guitar, backing vocals (2002–2004)
- Kris Kohls – drums (2002)
- Adam Hamilton – keyboards, rhythm guitar, backing vocals (2002)
- John Corabi – rhythm guitar, backing vocals (2002–2003)
- Scot Coogan – drums, backing vocals (2003–2006), lead vocals (2003)
- Scott Sorry – bass guitar, backing vocals (2005)
- Ginger – rhythm guitar, backing vocals (2005)
- Jeremy Guns – bass guitar (2005, touring)

== Discography ==
- Here Come the Brides (2004)
- Runaway Brides (2005)
