= The End Machine =

American rock band

- Origin: United States
- Genres: Heavy metal, hard rock
- Years active: 2018–present
- Label: Frontiers
- Members: George Lynch; Jeff Pilson; Girish Pradhan; Steve Brown
- Past members: Mick Brown; Robert Mason
- Website: The End Machine on Facebook

The End Machine is an American supergroup originally consisting of guitar player George Lynch (Lynch Mob, KXM, ex-Dokken), bass player Jeff Pilson (Foreigner, ex-Dokken, ex-Dio, ex-McAuley Schenker Group), drummer Mick Brown (ex-Dokken, ex-Lynch Mob, ex-Ted Nugent) and singer Robert Mason (Warrant, ex-Lynch Mob). According to a 2021 interview with guitarist George Lynch, the band is an intentional return to the classic Dokken sound.

Previously announced as Superstroke, the band released their debut self-titled album on March 22, 2019 produced by Jeff Pilson via Italia record label Frontiers.

During 2019 tour the Evanescence drummer Will Hunt temporarily replaced Mick Brown who then gave way permanently to his younger brother Steve who took part in the recordings of the new album entitled Phase2 which was released on April 9, 2021, also produced by Jeff Pilson via Frontiers.

On December 16, 2022, George Lynch announced The End Machine were working on the third album with a new singer, Girish Pradhan (Firstborne, Girish And The Chronicles). "We loved Robert Mason [who sang on the first two THE END MACHINE albums], and he's an incredible singer, but we felt it was time for a little bit of a change.", said Lynch.

On January 15, 2024, the band announced their third album, The Quantum Phase, would be released on March 8.

== Discography ==
- The End Machine (2019)
- Phase2 (2021)
- The Quantum Phase (2024)

== Members ==
Current members

- George Lynch – guitar (2018–present)
- Jeff Pilson – bass, backing vocals, keyboards, acoustic guitar, production (2018–present)
- Steve Brown – drums, percussion (2020–present)
- Girish Pradhan – vocals (2022–present)

Past members

- Robert Mason – vocals (2018–2022)
- Mick Brown – drums, backing vocals (2018–2019)

Touring members

- Will Hunt – drums (2019)
