= Lynch mob (disambiguation) =

A lynch mob is a crowd involved in a type of extrajudicial killing known as lynching.

Lynch mob or Lynch Mob may also refer to:

- Lynch Mob (band), a rock band
  - Lynch Mob (album)

== See also ==
- Da Lench Mob, a rap group
- Lench Mob Records, an independent record label
