= Smoke and Mirrors (Lynch Mob album) =

Smoke And Mirrors

Studio album by Lynch Mob
- Released: October 13, 2009
- Studios: Optimum Sound, Burbank and Sound City Studios, Van Nuys, California
- Genres: Heavy metal, hard rock
- Length: 60:52
- Label: Frontiers
- Producers: Lynch Mob, Bob Kulick, Brett Chassen

Lynch Mob chronology
REvolution: Live! (2006)	Smoke And Mirrors (2009)	Rebel (Lynch Mob album) (2015)

Professional ratings
Review scores
Source	Rating
AllMusic	3.5/5 stars
Classic Rock	6/10 stars

Smoke and Mirrors is the fifth studio album by the American hard rock band Lynch Mob released in 2009. The release sees the return of the original vocalist Oni Logan since their first album, Wicked Sensation, as well as the heavy metal/hard rock signature sound that the band is known for. Bassist Marco Mendoza (Thin Lizzy) and drummer Scot Coogan (Brides Of Destruction) complete the line-up.

== Track listing ==
All lyrics are written by Oni Logan, except where noted; all music is composed by George Lynch.

No.	Title	Length
1.	"21st Century Man" (Logan, Marco Mendoza)	4:57
2.	"Smoke & Mirrors"	5:02
3.	"Lucky Man"	4:31
4.	"My Kind of Healer"	3:35
5.	"Time Keepers"	6:56
6.	"Revolution Hero"	4:02
7.	"Let the Music Be Your Master"	6:20
8.	"The Facist"	4:11
9.	"Where Do You Sleep at Night"	3:52
10.	"Madly Backwards"	4:14
11.	"We Will Remain"	4:38
12.	"Before I Close My Eyes"	4:44

Bonus track
No.	Title	Length
1.	"Mansions in the Sky"	4:18

== Personnel ==
Lynch Mob

- Oni Logan – lead vocals
- George Lynch – guitars
- Marco Mendoza – bass, backing vocals
- Scot Coogan – drums, backing vocals

Production

- Bob Kulick – co–production
- Brett Chassen – co–production, engineering, backing vocals
- Yury Anisonyan, Rob Tarango – additional engineering
- Matt Chidgey – mixing
- Keith Blake – mastering
