= Sun Red Sun (EP) =

EP by Lynch Mob
- Released: December 9, 2014
- Genre: Heavy metal; hard rock
- Length: 36:16 (standard); 55:24 (deluxe)
- Label: Rat Pak Records
- Producer: Lynch Mob

Lynch Mob chronology
Unplugged: Live from Sugarhill Studios (2013)	Sun Red Sun (2014)	Rebel (2015)

Professional ratings
Review scores
Source	Rating
AllMusic	4.5/5 stars
crypticrock.com	4/5 stars
classicrockrevisited.com	4/5 stars
metaltotal.com	3/5 stars
Ultimate Guitar	3.5/5 stars
hardrockhaven.net	4.75/5 stars

Sun Red Sun is an EP by American rock band Lynch Mob. It was written and recorded by George Lynch, Oni Logan, Robbie Crane and Scot Coogan. It is the band's third album with Rat Pack Records.

== Track listing ==
No.	Title	Writer(s)	Length
1.	"Believers of the Day"	George Lynch; Oni Logan; Robbie Crane; Scot Coogan	5:52
2.	"Erotika"	Lynch; Logan; Crane; Coogan	5:16
3.	"Burnin' Sky" (Bad Company cover)	Paul Rodgers	5:02
4.	"Black Waters" (Instrumental)	Lynch	3:01
5.	"Play the Game"	Lynch; Logan; Crane; Coogan	5:59
6.	"Subliminal Dream"	Lynch; Logan; Crane; Coogan	5:20
7.	"Sun Red Sun"	Lynch; Logan	5:46

Deluxe edition: Sound Mountain Sessions
No.	Title	Writer(s)	Length
8.	"Slow Drag"	Lynch; Logan; Crane; Coogan	5:12
9.	"World of Chance"	Lynch; Logan; Crane; Coogan	5:25
10.	"City of Freedom"	Lynch; Logan; Crane; Coogan	4:20
11.	"Sucka"	Lynch; Logan; Crane; Coogan	4:11

== Personnel ==
- George Lynch – guitars
- Oni Logan – lead vocals
- Robbie Crane – bass, backing vocals
- Scot Coogan – drums, backing vocals

=== Additional personnel ===
- Donnie Dickman - keyboards (track 7)
- Crystal Clulee - backing vocals (track 7)
