= London LeGrand =

- Origin: Los Angeles
- Genres: Hard rock
- Occupations: Vocalist, musician, songwriter
- Years active: 2004–present
- Labels: Sanctuary Records, Shrapnel Records
- Website: Official Myspace

Edward "London" LeGrand (born 31 July 1969) is an American musician, lyricist, and vocalist best known for his time with hard rock supergroup Brides of Destruction with Nikki Sixx of Mötley Crüe and Tracii Guns of L.A. Guns. After the group went on hiatus he formed another band with George Lynch of Dokken and Lynch Mob fame called Souls of We releasing their debut album Let the Truth Be Known in 2008. He also has a side-project named Rockstars on Mars whose demos can be heard on the band's Myspace page.

== History ==
=== Early life ===
Prior to joining Brides of Destruction, LeGrand was a hair stylist working in Los Angeles. He had previously attempted to become the new singer for Lynch Mob after sending an audition tape to George Lynch. He was unsuccessful but LeGrand did begin working with Lynch on some of the early demos that would be Souls of We's debut album Let the Truth Be Known. This was put on hold however when LeGrand successfully auditioned to be the new singer of Brides of Destruction.

=== Brides of Destruction ===
Brides of Destruction was formed by Nikki Sixx and Tracii Guns in Los Angeles 2002 initially with the name Cockstar after Mötley Crüe went on hiatus and Guns left L.A. Guns. The lineup was rounded off with LeGrand on vocals, keyboardist Adam Hamilton and Kris Kohls of Adema on drums. They were advised by radio programmers that the name Cockstar wouldn't be announced on air. They briefly adopted the moniker Motordog before settling on Brides of Destruction after it was suggested to Sixx by a friend. Hamilton left shortly after and was replaced by John Corabi, also formerly of Mötley Crüe, who became the band's second guitarist but he would soon leave along with drummer Kohls.
Scot Coogan replaced Kohls on drums and the group released Here Come The Brides in 2004 where it managed to reach the top 100 of the Billboard 200.

Nikki Sixx then left the group for a Mötley Crüe reunion tour and was replaced by Scott Sorry formerly of Amen. Ginger of The Wildhearts joined the group as the second guitarist but soon left after a month. Runaway Brides was released in 2005 and failed to chart. Sorry departed before the European tour and was replaced by guitar/bass tech Jeremy Guns and Dazzle Rebel of Red Star Rebels for the shows.

Guns joined Quiet Riot after the end of the tour for just a month then put together The Tracii Guns Band which then became the second L.A. Guns thus putting Brides of Destruction on indefinite hiatus.

=== Souls of We ===
LeGrand returned to working with Lynch and formed the band Souls of We adding bass player Johny Chow of Fireball Ministry and Systematic and drummer Ya'el of Tom Morello and Alex Skolnick to the lineup. The debut album Let the Truth Be Known was self-produced and mixed by Mudrock, who has worked with bands such as Avenged Sevenfold and Godsmack, and was released on May 27, 2008. Guests on the album include Morgan Rose of Sevendust and Frédéric Leclercq of DragonForce. Ya'el left the band after recording and was replaced by Jordan Mancino of As I Lay Dying and the band made their live debut on May 23, 2009, at The Knitting Factory in Hollywood. The band continues to play different shows.

On October 26, 2009, a video was released for album track "Skeleton Key".

== Discography ==
=== Brides of Destruction ===
Title	Release date	Label	Charts
Here Come The Brides	2004	Sanctuary Records	Billboard 200 #92
Runaway Brides	2005	Shrapnel Records	

=== Souls of We ===
Title	Release date	Label
Let the Truth Be Known	2008	Shrapnel Records

=== Guest appearances ===
Year	Album title	Band	Credits
2009	Back in Blood	The 69 Eyes	additional vocals
2011	Kill All Control	George Lynch	lead vocals
