= Scatterbrain (KXM album) =

Studio album by KXM
- Released: March 17, 2017
- Studio: Steakhouse Studio, North Hollywood, California
- Genre: Hard rock
- Label: Rat Pak Records
- Producer: Chris Collier

KXM chronology
KXM (2014)	Scatterbrain (2017)	Circle of Dolls (2019)

Singles from Scatterbrain
- 1. "Scatterbrain" Released: January 13, 2017; 2. "Breakout" Released: February 3, 2017; 3. "Noises in the Sky" Released: February 24, 2017

Scatterbrain, released on March 17, 2017, is the second studio album by band KXM, a rock band formed in 2013 featuring King's X bassist and vocalist Doug Pinnick, former Dokken and Lynch Mob guitarist George Lynch and Korn drummer Ray Luzier.

== Recording ==
The recording process of Scatterbrain was very similar to that of the debut album. In a MusicRadar interview, Pinnick explained the process of "creating something out of nothing" was challenging as well as rewarding.

"The whole thing is to have a good time with no pressure, and as a result, this is what we got. We go in, start working on a song, and within an hour we’ve got it and move on to the next. There’s no real way to make music. You just have to dive in."

Pinnick notes that with their age and experience with their other bands, the song writing process was quicker and easier than when they were younger, so for them it was all about having a good time. Lynch revealed in an interview with Antihero that in post debut album discussions they had thought about doing things differently going forward and playing it safer. Luzier had other ideas and suggested not changing their original formula of creating everything from scratch in the recording sessions.

"Ray [Luzier] is usually the voice of reason; pretty clear headed, and he pretty much just decided, 'Listen, this is what we are, and we got to have faith in what we do, and each other. It’ll be fine.' And he was right."

Lynch also told Guitar World that they had booked a studio in North Hollywood and recorded all the songs for the album in just twelve days, which was two days more than it took to record the debut album.

== Equipment ==
Pinnick reportedly used his signature Schecter Baron-H Diamond Series four-string bass and his Schecter DP-12 twelve-string bass for the majority of the bass parts, and had experimented with his Schecter five-string bass for the tracks Noises In The Sky and Not A Single Word.

Lynch used a lot of different guitars for the album, mostly using his ESP Telecaster which is seen in the Scatterbrain music video. He would use different combinations of guitars for recording, for example the Telecaster with a Les Paul, or an ESP Stratocaster with his ESP Super V, to achieve the sounds he wanted on each track.

== Critical reception ==
The album received mostly positive reviews after its release. Metal Hammer gave it 3 and a half out of 5 stars and praised the quality of the music produced from the groups impromptu style recording sessions. Classic Rock gave it 4 out of 5 stars, highlighting the group's strong rapport with one another and stating that the album was "a massive leap forward" from the debut album.

"Heavy, grungy and stripped back, the sound is what might happen if Alice In Chains were caught in a studio with Tool, with Jeff Lynne producing."

Paul Simpson at AllMusic describes the album as more diverse and darker than the debut, and David Mark Pearce at Rockposer Dot Com! commends the groups ability to experiment further but still maintain their sound.

"As they openly admit, they just get together and, over a short amount of time, days in fact, jam it out until they’ve got their songs together and then record and refine - y’know the way bands used to do it!"

5 out of 5 stars was delivered by The Symphony Of Rock, alluding to the group's ability to make their experimentation on the album pay off. Specifically highlighted is Lynch's ability to incorporate new sounds whilst simultaneously retaining his original style. Luzier is also commended for his ability to adapt his drumming style to what ever each song needs with ease.

== Track listing ==
All tracks are written by Doug Pinnick, George Lynch and Ray Luzier.

No.	Title	Length
1.	"Scatterbrain"	5:07
2.	"Breakout"	5:10
3.	"Big Sky Country"	4:36
4.	"Calypso"	5:28
5.	"Not a Single Word"	4:59
6.	"Obsession"	5:37
7.	"Noises in the Sky"	5:30
8.	"Panic Attack"	5:20
9.	"It's Never Enough"	3:52
10.	"True Deceivers"	3:50
11.	"Stand"	5:09
12.	"Together"	5:22
13.	"Angel"	6:45
Total length:		66:45

== Personnel ==
- Doug Pinnick – bass, vocals
- George Lynch – guitars
- Ray Luzier – drums

=== Additional personnel ===
- Oscar Santiago – percussion

== Charts ==
Chart (2017)	Peak position
US Billboard 200	81
