= Unplugged: Live from Sugarhill Studios =

EP by Lynch Mob
- Released: March 26, 2013
- Genre: Heavy metal, hard rock
- Length: 34:42
- Label: Rat Pak Records
- Producer: Lynch Mob

Lynch Mob chronology
Sound Mountain Sessions (2012)	Unplugged: Live from Sugarhill Studios (2013)	Sun Red Sun (2014)

Unplugged: Live from Sugarhill Studios is the third EP by American rock band Lynch Mob, and the first record the band performed acoustic versions of their songs. Drummer Scot Coogan left the band and Brian Tichy (ex-Whitesnake) replaced him, but for the EP he plays guitars.

== Track list ==
No.	Title	Length
1.	"River of Love"	4:27
2.	"Where Do You Sleep at Night"	4:31
3.	"All I Want"	5:14
4.	"Wicked Sensation"	6:04

Bonus track
No.	Title	Length
1.	"Bonus interview track"	14:26

== Personnel ==
- Oni Logan – lead vocals
- George Lynch – acoustic guitar, backing vocals
- Robbie Crane – acoustic bass, backing vocals
- Brian Tichy – acoustic guitar, backing vocals

Additional personnel

- Tyson Sheth – percussion
