= KXM (album) =

Studio album by KXM
- Released: March 11, 2014
- Studio: Sound Mountain Studio, Leona Valley, California
- Genre: Hard rock
- Label: Rat Pak
- Producer: Chris Collier

KXM chronology
KXM (2014)	Scatterbrain (2017)

Singles from KXM
- 1. "Rescue Me" Released: March 7, 2014; 2. "Gunfight" Released: June 9, 2014; 3. "Faith Is A Room" Released: March 6, 2015

KXM is the self titled debut studio album by American rock supergroup KXM released through Rat Pak Records on March 11, 2014. The band features Doug (or dUg) Pinnick from King's X, George Lynch from Lynch Mob and formerly of Dokken, and Ray Luzier from Korn.

== Recording ==
Talking to Screamer Magazine, Lynch explains there was no preliminary production or writing, and the three of them had not played together prior to the recording sessions. They would go into the studio and essentially write and record a song in a single day.

"We were friends that had just decided to go meet somewhere at a studio, and live together for a week and a half and create all that from scratch".

In an interview with The Rockpit, Pinnick would elaborate on this, saying that they all had agreed to go into it with no egos and no preconceived ideas about what they were going to do.

"Nobody brings anything in, nobody works on anything that's been preconceived, nobody tells anybody what to play, everybody does what they want to do and if we do that then it's all going to work".

== Critical reception ==
Professional ratings
Review scores
Source	Rating
AllMusic	2.5/5 stars
Blabbermouth	8/10 stars
Classic Rock	3/5 stars

The album received mixed reviews upon release, although more positive than negative.

AllMusic gave it a 2 and a half star rating, acknowledging the talent and playing ability of the musicians but criticizing the editing of the tracks themselves. "If these three inveterate rockers can choose a single direction to take their sound, the results could be devastating".

Classic Rock described the album as a "worthy debut," and gave it a three-star rating.

== Track listing ==
All tracks are written by Doug Pinnick, George Lynch and Ray Luzier.

No.	Title	Length
1.	"Stars"	5:42
2.	"Rescue Me"	4:38
3.	"Gunfight"	4:46
4.	"Never Stop"	4:43
5.	"Faith Is A Room"	5:06
6.	"I'll Be Ok"	4:51
7.	"Sleep"	4:17
8.	"Love"	4:41
9.	"Burn"	5:11
10.	"Do It Now"	3:58
11.	"Human Friction"	6:03
12.	"Tranquilize"	3:29
13.	"Rescue Me (Radio Edit)"	4:17
Total length:		61:42

Japanese Edition Bonus Track
No.	Title	Length
14.	"Big Rocks"	3:59
Total length:		65:41

European Edition
No.	Title	Length
1.	"Human Friction"	6:03
2.	"Rescue Me"	4:38
3.	"Gunfight"	4:46
4.	"Never Stop"	4:43
5.	"Faith Is A Room"	5:06
6.	"Stars"	5:42
7.	"I'll Be Ok"	4:51
8.	"Sleep"	4:17
9.	"Love"	4:41
10.	"Burn"	5:11
11.	"Do It Now"	3:58
12.	"Tranquilize"	3:29
Total length:		57:25

== Personnel ==
- Doug Pinnick – bass, vocals
- George Lynch – guitars
- Ray Luzier – drums, percussion

=== Additional personnel ===
- Donny Dickman – keyboards
- Jeff Pilson – additional writing
- Chris Collier – mixing, mastering, engineering
- Motionless Visions – layout
- Sebastién Paquet – photography

== Charts ==
Chart (2014)	Peak position
US Billboard 200	31
