= Strum Sum Up =

Studio album by Doug Pinnick
- Released: November 20, 2007
- Genre: Rock
- Label: Magna Carta
- Producers: Michael Parnin; Doug Pinnick; Wally Farkas

Doug Pinnick chronology
| Songs from the Closet (2006) | Strum Sum Up (2007) | Naked (2013) |

Strum Sum Up is the fourth solo studio album by American rock musician Doug Pinnick. The album contains many guest appearances, including Steve Stevens, Alain Johannes, Natasha Shneider, Hal Sparks, Ray Luzier, and members of Galactic Cowboys and Failure.

== Track listing ==
1. Perfect World
2. Perfect World Pt. 2
3. Damn It
4. Dynomite
5. Dynomite Pt. 2
6. Life Is What You Make It
7. Life Is What You Make It Pt. 2
8. Angel
9. Coming Over
10. Smile
11. All I Want
12. Hostile World
13. Cross It
14. Cross It Pt. 2
