= Runaway bride =

Runaway bride(s) or The Runaway Bride may refer to:

- Runaway bride case, a 2005 American abduction hoax
- The Runaway Bride (film), a 1930 film starring Mary Astor
- Runaway Bride (film), a 1999 romantic comedy starring Julia Roberts
- "The Runaway Bride" (Doctor Who), a 2006 episode of the TV series
- The Runaway Bride (novel), a 1994 Nancy Drew Files novel
- Runaway Brides, a 2005 album by Brides of Destruction
