= Souls of We =

US musical group

- Also known as: George Lynch's Souls of We
- Origin: Los Angeles, California, US
- Genres: Hard rock, heavy metal
- Years active: 2007–present
- Labels: Under a Deadtree, Shrapnel
- Members: London LeGrand; George Lynch; Johny Chow; Jordan Mancino
- Past members: Yael

Souls of We (also known as George Lynch's Souls of We) is an American hard rock supergroup from Los Angeles, California, formed in 2007. The lineup consists of London LeGrand (vocals), George Lynch (guitar) and Johny Chow (bass). Since 2009, Jordan Mancino has been the band's drummer, replacing Yael.

London LeGrand had previously sent audition tapes for George Lynch's post-Dokken band Lynch Mob. Though unsuccessful, they both began working together years later in the band Microdot. LeGrand soon joined Brides of Destruction in 2002, effectively ending Microdot. When Brides of Destruction went on hiatus in 2006, Lynch and LeGrand put together a new band called Band of Flakes with Jason Slater, of Snake River Conspiracy, and Scot Coogan, formerly of Brides of Destruction. The band proved to be unsuccessful, however, Lynch and LeGrand continued, forming Souls of We with bassist Johny Chow, of Fireball Ministry, Systematic and Cavalera Conspiracy, as well as drummer Yael, formerly of Tom Morello and Alex Skolnick, in 2007.

Souls of We released their debut album, Let the Truth Be Known, in 2008 before making their live debut in March 2009. They started writing and recording their second album in February 2010.

== History ==
=== Formation (1989–2007) ===
Guitarist George Lynch was previously a member of Dokken from the late 70's to late 80's. Following the breakup of the band in 1989, Lynch formed Lynch Mob with former Dokken bandmate Mick Brown. When Lynch Mob were auditioning for singers, London LeGrand send in an audition tape. However, the band never contacted LeGrand.

Lynch eventually met LeGrand while he was working as a hair stylist in Los Angeles where Lynch gave him a demo tape of new songs. Lynch went on to form a project known as Stonehouse before forming Microdot with LeGrand. It was at this time that LeGrand joined Brides of Destruction, formed by Nikki Sixx and Tracii Guns, in 2002.

When Guns put Brides of Destruction on hiatus in 2006, LeGrand formed Rockstars on Mars as well as Band of Flakes with Lynch, Jason Slater of Snake River Conspiracy and former Brides of Destruction bandmate Scot Coogan. Though the band was unsuccessful, Lynch and LeGrand continued to write and record, bringing in bassist Johny Chow of Fireball Ministry and Systematic as well as former Tom Morello and Alex Skolnick drummer Yael, forming Souls of We, from one of their song's lyrics, in 2007.

=== Let the Truth Be Known (2007–2009) ===
The band recorded their album at various studios and was produced by both Lynch and LeGrand and mixed by Mudrock. The album featured material from previous projects Stonehouse, Microdot and Band of Flakes as well as contributions by Jeff Pilson Morgan Rose, Frédéric Leclercq, Andrew Freeman, Patrick Johansson, Bobby Jarzombek and Mike Hansen.

Let the Truth Be Known was first released independently through Under the Deadtree Records on May 27, 2008. It was limited to a thousand copies and featured album artwork with blues musician Robert Johnson on the cover. After signing with Shrapnel Records, the album was re-released, under the moniker of George Lynch's Souls of We, with an additional song on November 4 the same year. LeGrand described the album as "Mother Love Bone in the year 2008" while Greg Prato of allmusic stated that "[t]here are quite a few headbanging highlights" and that "fans would buy [Lynch's] latest album for the six-string shredwork alone."

The band were offered a supporting slot on the Black Label Society and Sevendust tour, that took place in March 2009, but turned it down due to financial reasons. They made their live debut on May 23, 2009 at The Knitting Factory in Hollywood, California with Jordan Mancino, of As I Lay Dying, replacing Yael on drums. The band scheduled more tour dates, primarily in California, while they released a music video for the song "Skeleton Key".

=== New album (2010–present) ===
Lynch announced on his Twitter page, in February 2010, that he and LeGrand had "commenced the songwriting sessions" for the band's second album and were to enter the studio the same month. He also stated the Souls of We were to begin touring on March 5.

== Band members ==
- London LeGrand – vocals (2007–present)
- George Lynch – guitar (2007–present)
- Johny Chow – bass (2007–present)
- Jordan Mancino – drums, percussion (2009–present)

Former members

- Yael – drums, percussion (2007–2009)

== Discography ==
- Let the Truth Be Known (2008)
