= Sound Mountain Sessions =

EP by Lynch Mob
- Released: August 7, 2012
- Genre: Heavy metal, hard rock
- Length: 19:08
- Label: Rat Pak Records
- Producer: Lynch Mob

Lynch Mob chronology
Smoke and Mirrors (2009)	Sound Mountain Sessions (2012)	Unplugged: Live from Sugarhill Studios (2013)

Sound Mountain Sessions is the second EP by American rock band Lynch Mob, and second record after the return of the original vocalist Oni Logan. Bassist Marco Mendoza left the band in tour and Robbie Crane (ex-Ratt) filled the spot. This is the first record of the band with the Rat Pak Records label.

== Track listing ==
No.	Title	Writer(s)	Length
1.	"Slow Drag"	George Lynch	5:12
2.	"World of Chance"	Lynch	5:25
3.	"City of Freedom"	Lynch	4:20
4.	"Sucka"	Lynch	4:11

== Personnel ==
- Oni Logan – lead vocals
- George Lynch – guitars
- Robbie Crane – bass, backing vocals
- Scot Coogan – drums, backing vocals
