= Doug Pinnick =

American bassist and singer (born 1950)

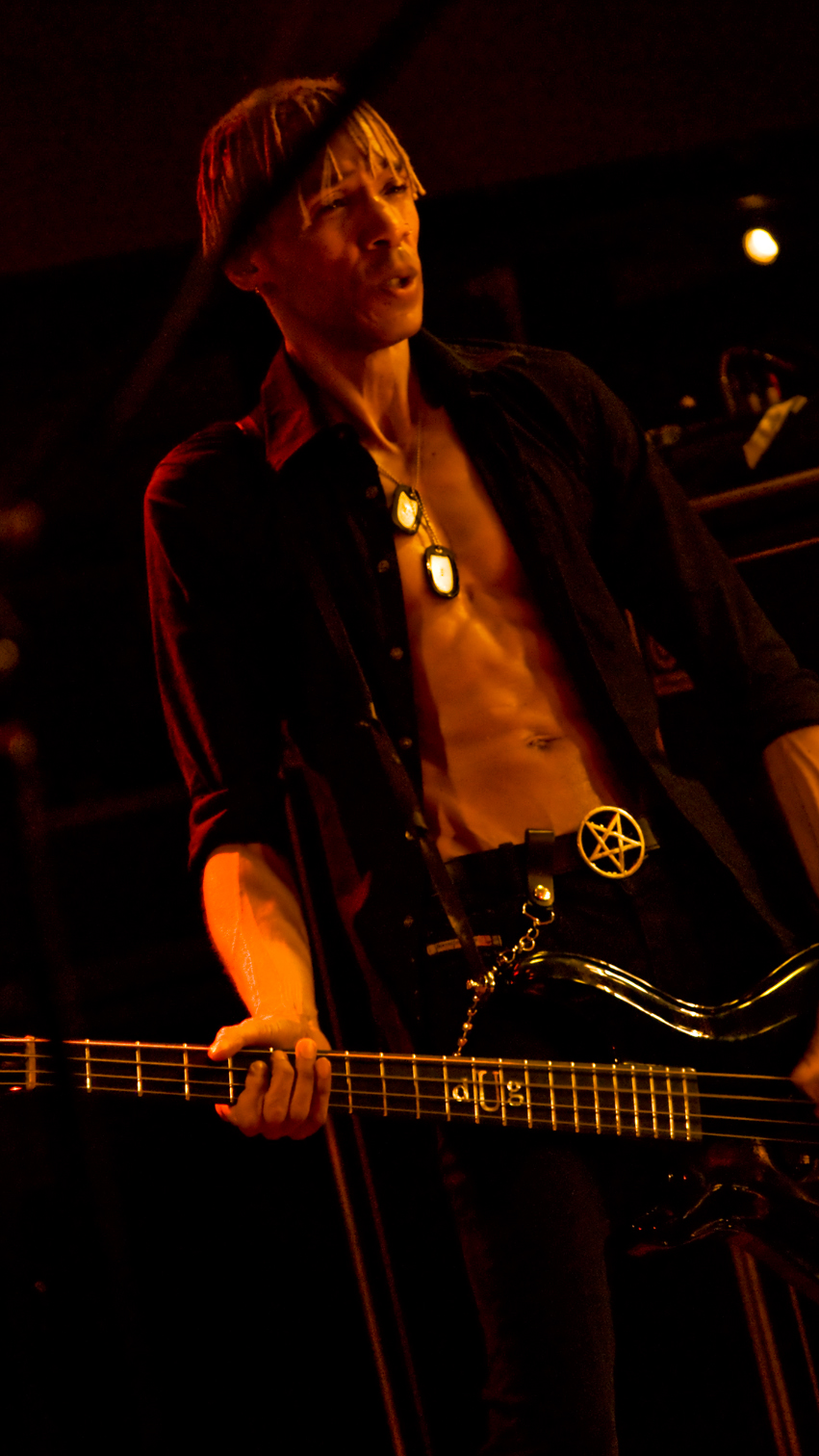
- Pinnick performing with King's X in 2009

Background information
- Also known as: dUg Pinnick
- Born: Douglas Theodore Pinnick; September 3, 1950 (age 76); Braidwood, Illinois, U.S.
- Genres: Hard rock, progressive rock, progressive metal, alternative metal
- Occupations: Musician, singer, songwriter
- Instruments: Vocals, bass
- Years active: 1960s-present
- Member of: King's X, KXM, Grinder Blues, Pinnick Gales Pridgen
- Formerly of: 3rd Ear Experience, Tres Mts., Poundhound

Douglas Theodore Pinnick (born September 3, 1950), sometimes stylized as dUg Pinnick or simply dUg, is an American musician best known as the bass guitarist, co-lead vocalist, and songwriter for the hard rock and progressive metal band King's X. He has performed on 15 albums with King's X and recorded four solo albums. Pinnick has also participated in numerous side projects and has multiple guest appearances to his credit.

== Biography ==
Pinnick was born in Braidwood, Illinois, and moved to Joliet, Illinois, when he was fourteen. He grew up in a musical family where everyone either sang or played an instrument. Pinnick has fourteen half-siblings, reporting his father had eight children with two women while his mother had seven children with six men. He was the only child his parents had in common. He was raised by his great-grandmother, a devoutly religious woman, and was reared in a very strict Southern Baptist environment.

When he was in grade school, Pinnick participated in choir and played saxophone. As a teenager, he listened to classic R&B and Motown artists such as Stevie Wonder, Little Richard, and Aretha Franklin. Pinnick sang in bands throughout high school, one of the earliest being a group called Stone Flower which he describes as "Chicago Transit Authority meets Sly & the Family Stone". While attending Joliet Junior College in 1969, Pinnick was inspired by hard rock bands such as Led Zeppelin and Jimi Hendrix. Around this time, he also started listening to perhaps his biggest influence, Sly & the Family Stone. His dream was to form a band that combined all of these varied influences.

After attending college for roughly six months, Pinnick dropped out and joined a traveling gospel band called The Spurrlows.

At one point in the early 1970s, Pinnick moved to a Christian community in Florida. There, he remained involved in the music business by promoting small shows by Christian rock bands. Shortly after that, he moved back to Illinois.

In the mid 1970s, Pinnick formed a band called Servant, with keyboardist Matt Spransy, that played progressive art rock along the lines of Yes and Emerson, Lake & Palmer. The band played in the midwest and put together a demo of original songs. There was another band called Servant who had scored a recording contract. Spransy joined the other band in the late seventies and recorded "I'm Gonna Live" for the 1981 album Rockin' Revival that he and Pinnick had written together. Pinnick was also part of Alpha as well as his own Doug Pinnick Band shortly after Spransy joined the other Servant.

In 1979, Pinnick was invited to join a band that was forming in Springfield, Missouri with singer Greg X. Volz of Petra fame. He accepted the offer and re-located, only to have the band dissolve within a month of his arrival. He was soon offered a spot in guitarist Phil Keaggy's touring band, along with the drummer from the failed Volz project, Jerry Gaskill. Pinnick has a co-writing credit on the track "Just a Moment Away" from Keaggy's 1980 album Ph'lip Side. Pinnick toured with Keaggy for about a year before returning to Springfield and set about looking for a new musical project.

Pinnick soon became involved with guitarist Ty Tabor after seeing him play a concert at Evangel College in Springfield. Jerry Gaskill was later included and the band The Edge was born. In 1983, the band changed their name to Sneak Preview and released an independent, self titled LP. The trio evolved into King's X several years (and a move to Houston, Texas) later.

Since then, Pinnick has remained active in rock music and has collaborated with other artists through guest appearances, side bands, and recording projects.

In 1998, Pinnick confirmed his homosexuality, coming out during an interview for Regeneration Quarterly. Diamante Music Group, a major booster for King’s X, canceled distribution of the band’s material in Christian retail stores following this information becoming public knowledge. In recent years, Pinnick has revealed that he now identifies as agnostic, in contrast to his Contemporary Christian music past.

Besides King's X, Pinnick became active with his own Hound Pound studio in Texas. He currently resides in Los Angeles.

In March 2018, it was announced that original member of the proto punk band MC5, Wayne Kramer, would embark on a 35-date tour of North America for their 50th anniversary of the band's debut, Kick Out the Jams, recruiting Pinnick to play bass along with Kim Thayil of Soundgarden, Brendan Canty of Fugazi, and Marcus Durant of Zen Guerrilla.

== Projects ==
Pinnick's first solo project, Poundhound, released two albums, Massive Grooves and Pineappleskunk, with King's X bandmate Jerry Gaskill on drums on some tracks from the first album and all tracks on the second. Doug dropped the Poundhound moniker for his third solo album, Emotional Animal, instead crediting himself as "dUg Pinnick." The album, released by Magna Carta Records, features Gaskill's son, Joey, on drums. He released his fourth solo album, Strum Sum Up in November 2007 on Magna Carta.

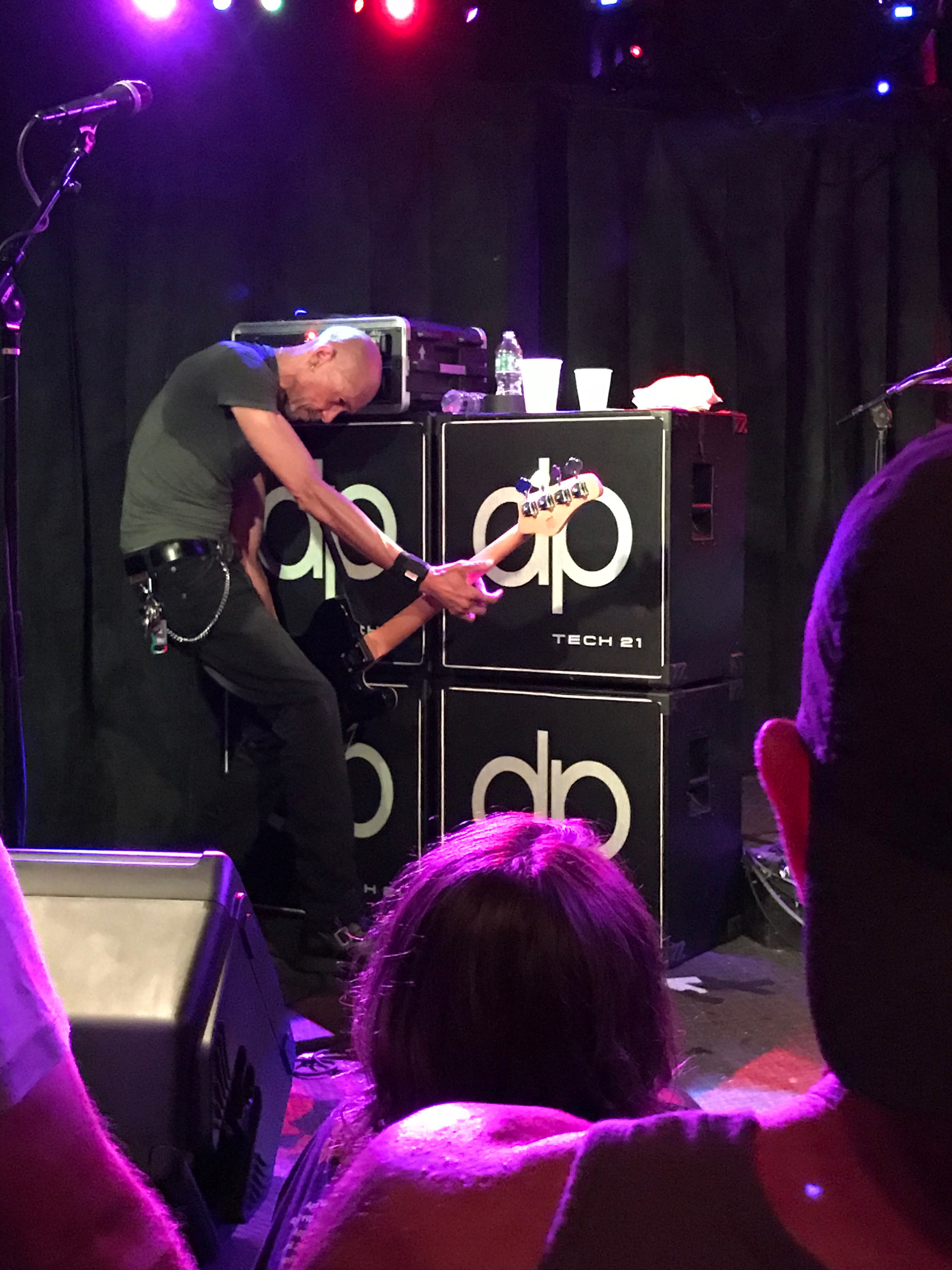
Pinnick in 2018

Pinnick was also a member of the short-lived band Supershine, along with long-time Trouble guitarist, Bruce Franklin and Trouble drummer, Jeff Olson. Supershine released only one self-titled album in 2000 on Metal Blade Records. He sang lead vocals on the eponymous debut album by former Winger guitarist Reb Beach's band The Mob, released in 2005. He also stood in for lead singer Corey Glover on Living Colour's European tour in August 2006 while Glover was starring as Judas Iscariot in a tour of Jesus Christ Superstar.

Other vocal appearances by Doug Pinnick include Dream Theater's "Lines in the Sand" (guest vocals in the choruses) from the Falling into Infinity album, "Welcome to the Machine" from the An All Star Lineup Performing the Songs of Pink Floyd album, "Parasite" on an all-star tribute to Kiss entitled Spin The Bottle, as well as "Taxman" on a Beatles tribute album entitled Butchering the Beatles.

Pinnick appears on the 2008 holiday album We Wish You a Metal Xmas..., a compilation album featuring many hard rock musicians collaborating on popular Christmas songs. Pinnick appears on the track "Little Drummer Boy". He performed guest vocals on the Black Sugar Transmission track "Runnin' Like a Dog", which was released on the band's e.p. USE IT in 2009. He also performs with King's X partner Ty Tabor, along with former Galactic Cowboys members Wally Farkas and Alan Doss, as a group called The Jibbs. They have a song, "Burns In The Rain", available via download to help relief efforts following Hurricane Ike.

Dug sang all lead vocals on Razr 13's (Austin, Texas) debut record "Reflections" released in 2009. Professional wrestler, Vinnie Vineyard (Funkmaster V) who stars in the paranormal TV show Wrestling With Ghosts, uses a remixed version of Pinnick's "Coming Over" as his entrance music in solo matches. Hal Sparks used several tracks off of Pinnick's Strum Sum Up CD as his musical accompaniment during his magic show performances on VH1's Celebracadabra that aired in 2008.

Pinnick's side project, Tres Mts., with Jeff Ament of Pearl Jam and Richard Stuverud of the Fastbacks, released their album, Three Mountains, through Monkeywrench Records in March 2011. He also sang backup on Pearl Jam's song "W.M.A." during Pearl Jam's April 3, 1994, concert, which King's X opened for.

In February 2013, Magna Carta released the Mike Varney-produced Pinnick Gales Pridgen, featuring Eric Gales on guitar and vocals, Pinnick on bass and vocals, and Thomas Pridgen (formerly of The Mars Volta) on drums. The 13-track album features one cover song, "Sunshine of Your Love", originally by Cream, one short instrumental based on Ludwig van Beethoven's "Für Elise", and the remaining songs written by some combination of Pinnick, Gales, Pridgen and Varney. The follow-up, titled PGP 2, was released on July 8, 2014.

In 2013, Pinnick collaborated with friend Robbi Robb of Tribe After Tribe to form the Mojave, California-based jam band 3rd Ear Experience. They released two albums, Peacock Black and Boi, the later issued through Megaforce Records, within only months of each other. A third album, Incredible Good Fortune, followed in 2014 although Pinnick did not appear on it.

In March 2014, Pinnick's all-star side project KXM, featuring former Dokken guitarist George Lynch and Korn drummer Ray Luzier, released their eponymous debut album through Rat Pak Records. In May 2014, Pinnick's side project Grinder Blues with the Bihlman Brothers signed a deal with Megaforce Records and announced an August 2014 release for their debut record.

== Discography ==
=== King's X ===
- See the entry for King's X

=== Poundhound ===
- Massive Grooves... (1998)
- Pineappleskunk (2001)

=== Solo albums ===
- Emotional Animal (2005)
- Songs from the Closet (Molken Music, 2006) A collection of King's X demos with two previously unreleased songs
- Strum Sum Up (2007)
- Naked (2013)
- Tribute to Jimi (Often Imitated but Never Duplicated) (RatPak Records, 2018)
- Joy Bomb (2021)
- Thingamajigger (2024)

=== KXM ===
- KXM (2014)
- Scatterbrain (2017)
- Circle of Dolls (2019)

=== Grinder Blues ===
- Grinder Blues (2014)
- El Dos (2021)

=== Pinnick, Gales and Pridgen ===
- PGP (2013)
- PGP 2 (2014)

=== Side bands ===
- Supershine – s/t (2000)
- The Mob – s/t (2005)
- The Jibbs – "Burns In The Rain" single (2008)
- Razr 13 – Reflections (2009)
- Tres Mts. - Three Mountains (2011)
- 3rd Ear Experience – Peacock Black (2013)
- 3rd Ear Experience – Boi (2013)
