= KXM =

American rock band

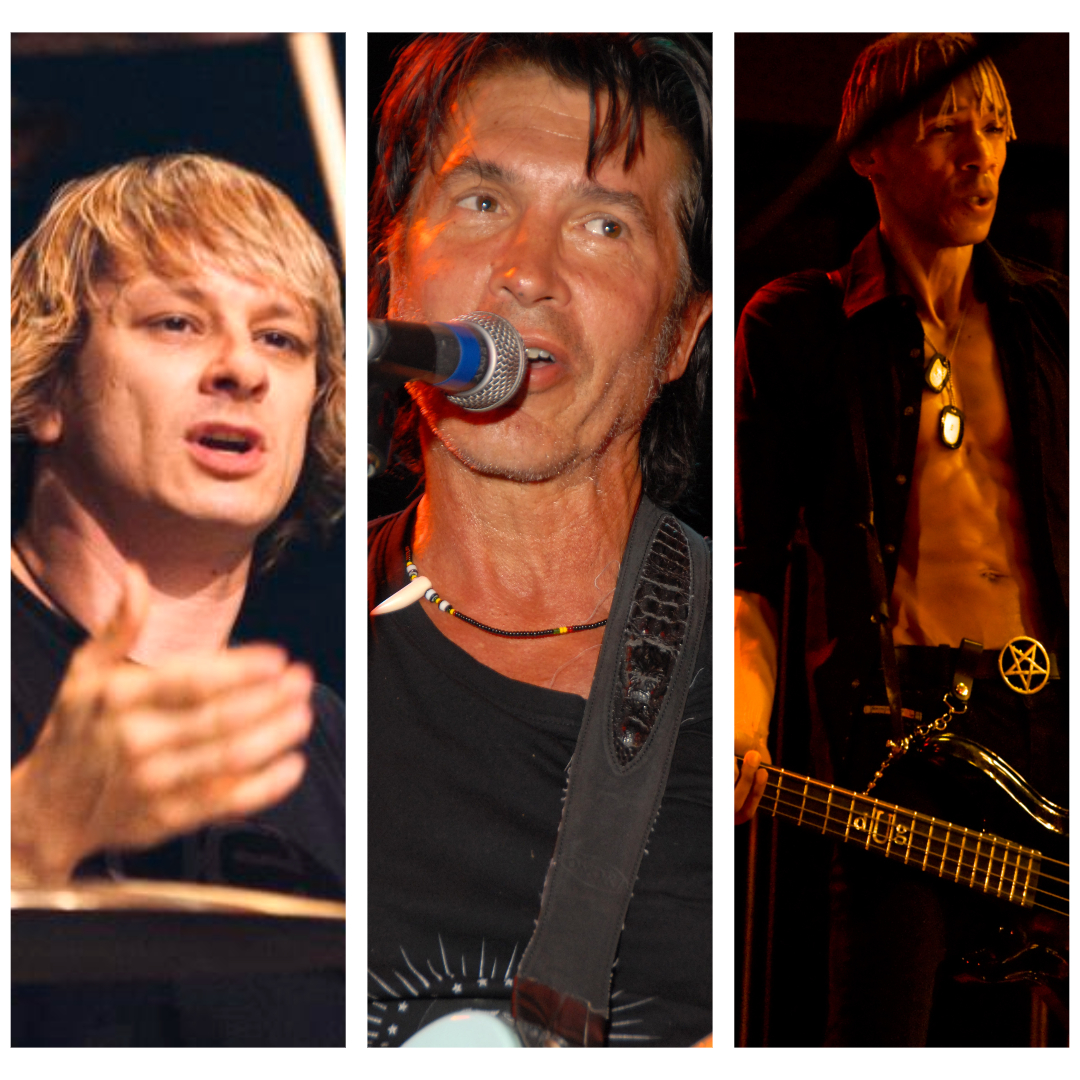
- Lineup of KXM. From left to right: Ray Luzier, George Lynch, dUg Pinnick

Background information
- Origin: Los Angeles, California, U.S.
- Genres: Hard rock
- Years active: 2013–present
- Labels: Rat Pak, Frontiers
- Members: Ray Luzier; George Lynch; dUg Pinnick
- Website: https://www.facebook.com/KXMofficial/

KXM is an American hard rock supergroup formed in 2013, consisting of drummer Ray Luzier (Korn), bassist/vocalist dUg Pinnick (King's X), and guitarist George Lynch (Lynch Mob and Dokken). Signed to Rat Pak Records, they have released a self-titled album in 2014, Scatterbrain in 2017 and Circle of Dolls in 2019, the latter through Frontiers Records.

== Background ==
KXM was formed when the three members met during a birthday party for Luzier's son. The drummer took the other two through a tour of his new home studio and suggested they write and record an album. According to Lynch, the name KXM was derived from each member's full-time band: K from Korn, X from King's X, and M from Lynch Mob.

The band released their self-titled debut album on March 11, 2014, through Rat Pak Records.

A second album, Scatterbrain, was released on March 17, 2017.

In January 2018, it was reported that KXM was in the studio recording their third album, Circle of Dolls, which was released on September 13, 2019, via Frontiers Records.

== Discography ==
- KXM (Rat Pak Records, 2014)
- Scatterbrain (Rat Pak, 2017)
- Circle of Dolls (Rat Pak; Frontiers, 2019)
