= The End Machine (album) =

Studio album by The End Machine
- Released: March 22, 2019 (International edition); March 13, 2019 (Japanese edition)
- Studio: Pilsound Studios, Santa Clarita, California, US
- Genre: Heavy metal; hard rock
- Length: 56:45 (International edition); 62:01 (Japanese edition)
- Label: Frontiers (International edition); Nexus and Seven Seas (Japanese edition)
- Producer: Jeff Pilson

The End Machine chronology
The End Machine (2019)	Phase2 (2021)

Singles from The End Machine
- 1. "Alive Today" Released: January 11, 2019; 2. "Burn the Truth" Released: March 7, 2019; 3. "Leap of Faith" Released: March 22, 2019

The End Machine is the first album by American supergroup The End Machine. It was released on March 22, 2019, and produced by bass player Jeff Pilson for Italian music label Frontiers Records. It was preceded by the single "Alive Today" on January 11, 2019. According to a 2021 interview with guitarist George Lynch, the band is an intentional return to the classic Dokken sound.

The band played three live shows to promote the album.

== Track listing ==
All songs written by George Lynch, Jeff Pilson and Robert Mason.

No.	Title	Length
1.	"Leap of Faith"	5:07
2.	"Hold Me Down"	5:17
3.	"No Game"	4:39
4.	"Bulletproof"	4:48
5.	"Ride It"	4:50
6.	"Burn the Truth"	6:12
7.	"Hard Road"	4:02
8.	"Alive Today"	5:33
9.	"Line of Division"	4:43
10.	"Sleeping Voices"	6:45
11.	"Life is Love is Music"	4:49
Total length:		56:45

Japan edition bonus track
No.	Title	Length
12.	"Burn the Truth" (acoustic version)	6:01

Japan edition bonus DVD
No.	Title	Length
1.	"Leap of Faith" (music video)
2.	"Alive Today" (music video)

== Personnel ==
- George Lynch - electric guitar, acoustic Guitar, sounds
- Jeff Pilson - bass, 10-String Bass, fretless bass, keyboards, acoustic guitar, backing vocals, producing, recording
- Mick Brown - drums, percussion, backing vocals
- Robert Mason - lead and backing vocals

=== Additional personnel ===
- Alessandro Del Vecchio - mixing, mastering at Ivotytears Music Works Studios, Somma Lombardo, Italy
- Maor Appelbaum - remastering at Maor Appelbaum Mastering, Los Angeles, CA United States
- G.H. Mason - Art & Design
