= Circle of Dolls =

Studio album by KXM
- Released: September 13, 2019
- Studios: Steakhouse Studios, Burbank, California; Lose Yer Ear Studios (Timeline Studio), Franklin, Tennessee
- Genre: Hard rock
- Length: 63:07
- Label: Rat Pak
- Producers: Chris Collier; KXM

KXM chronology
Scatterbrain (2017)	Circle of Dolls (2019)

Singles from Circle of Dolls
- 1. "War of Words" Released: July 23, 2019; 2. "Lightning" Released: August 8, 2019; 3. "Time Flies" Released: September 12, 2019

Professional ratings
Review scores
Source	Rating
Metal Temple	5.5/10 stars
Cryptic Rock	4/5 stars
All About the Rock	7/10 stars
Noise Pollution	8/10 stars

Circle of Dolls is the third album by American rock supergroup KXM. It was released via Rat Pak and Frontiers Records on September 13, 2019 and it was produced by KXM and Chris Collier.

It was preceded by the singles "War of Words" on July 23, "Lightning" on August 8 and "Time Flies" on September 12.

== Track listing ==
All songs written by Doug Pinnick, George Lynch and Ray Luzier.

No.	Title	Length
1.	"War of Words"	4:23
2.	"Mind Swamp"	5:07
3.	"Circle of Dolls"	4:38
4.	"Lightning"	6:39
5.	"Time Flies"	4:54
6.	"Twice"	6:16
7.	"Big as the Sun"	4:23
8.	"Vessel of Destruction"	4:01
9.	"A Day Without Me"	4:13
10.	"Wide Awake"	5:25
11.	"Shadow Lover"	3:54
12.	"Cold Sweats"	3:39
13.	"The Border"	5:35
Total length:		63:07

Japanese edition bonus track
No.	Title	Length
14.	"Lightning" (Radio Edit)	4:38
Total length:		67:45

== Personnel ==
- Doug Pinnick – bass, vocals
- George Lynch – guitars
- Ray Luzier – drums

Additional personnel

- KXM – production
- Oscar Santiago – percussion
- Chris Collier – backing vocals, production, recording, mixing
- Scott Bush – percussion recording
- Maor Appelbaum – mastering
- Jean Michel (DSNS Artwork) – artwork
- Kevin Baldes – photography
