= Pineappleskunk =

Studio album by Poundhound (Doug Pinnick)
- Released: 2001
- Studios: Houndpound, Psychofunkadelic
- Genres: Funk metal, hard rock
- Length: 49:29
- Label: Metal Blade
- Producer: Doug Pinnick

Poundhound (Doug Pinnick) chronology
Massive Grooves... (1998)	Pineappleskunk (2001)	Emotional Animal (2005)

Professional ratings
Review scores
Source	Rating
AllMusic	3/5 stars

Pineappleskunk is the second solo release by Doug Pinnick of King's X.

Initial copies of the album were released with the bonus disc entitled 'Live Bootleg Video'. The concert was recorded at Instant Karma Club in Houston, Texas, on September 4, 1999, and runs for 54 minutes.

== Track listing ==
All tracks are written by Doug Pinnick.

No.	Title	Length
1.	"Somedays"	3:13
2.	"Rise-n-Shine"	1:02
3.	"Jumpin"	3:10
4.	"Mind"	4:45
5.	"Oh My Soul"	3:48
6.	"Next in Line"	3:17
7.	"Rain"	3:52
8.	"Pineapple"	3:40
9.	"Wrong Address"	0:33
10.	"Higher"	4:00
11.	"She"	2:45
12.	"Someone"	3:05
13.	"Smearing"	2:50
14.	"Atlanta"	3:20
15.	"The Will"	0:52
16.	"Eventime"	4:37

== Personnel ==
- Doug Pinnick – vocal, bass guitar, guitar
- Jerry Gaskill – drums
- Answering machine voices – Chris Brown, Doug VanPelt (Heaven's Edge/HM founder), Jimi Hazel (24-7 Spyz) and John Crumbley

== 'Live Bootleg Video' Track Listing ==
No.	Title	Length
1.	"Jangle"
2.	"Darker"
3.	"Love"
4.	"Shake"
5.	"Music"
6.	"Blindeye"
7.	"Supersalad"
8.	"Hey"
9.	"River"
10.	"Happy Birthday Doug!"
11.	"Soul"
12.	"Friends"
