= Emotional Animal =

Studio album by Doug Pinnick
- Released: August 2, 2005
- Genre: Rock
- Label: Magna Carta
- Producer: Doug Pinnick

Doug Pinnick chronology
Pineappleskunk (2001)	Emotional Animal (2005)	Songs from the Closet (2006)

Professional ratings
Review scores
Source	Rating
AllMusic	3.5/5 stars

Emotional Animal is the third studio solo album by American rock musician Doug Pinnick. It was released in 2005 on Magna Carta Records.

== Track listing ==
All tracks are written by Doug Pinnick.

No.	Title	Length
1.	"Crashing"	3:07
2.	"Beautiful"	3:25
3.	"Change"	3:13
4.	"Noon"	5:32
5.	"Missing"	3:34
6.	"Equal Rights"	3:31
7.	"Hey Would You Know"	3:26
8.	"Zepp"	4:56
9.	"Haven't Been Here Before"	2:33
10.	"Bite"	3:21
11.	"Keep Up"	2:49
12.	"Are You Gonna Come"	5:33
13.	"Wrong"	1:00
14.	"Freak the Funk Out"	5:20
15.	"Mr. Hateyourself"	4:19

== Personnel ==
- Doug Pinnick – vocals and all instruments, except drums
- Joey Gaskill – drums
