= REvolution: Live! =

Live album by Lynch Mob
- Released: September 19, 2006
- Genres: Heavy metal, hard rock
- Length: 68:43
- Label: Deadline Music/Cleopatra
- Producer: George Lynch

Lynch Mob chronology
REvolution (2003)	REvolution: Live! (2006)	Smoke and Mirrors (2009)

REvolution: Live! is a live CD/DVD released by the American band Lynch Mob in 2006. The album/DVD was recorded during the REvolution tour. For this release, Michael Frowein was replaced by Chas Stumbo (ex-Earshot)

== Track listing ==
No.	Title	Length
1.	"Intro"	1:00
2.	"Paris Is Burning"	3:40
3.	"Dance of the Dogs"	3:45
4.	"Tangled in the Web"	3:58
5.	"All I Want"	5:12
6.	"Kiss of Death"	6:01
7.	"She's Evil but She's Mine"	5:08
8.	"Cold Is the Heart"	5:09
9.	"When Darkness Calls"	6:46
10.	"River of Love"	4:39
11.	"Rain"	4:54
12.	"Hell Child"	5:29
13.	"Breaking the Chains"	3:35
14.	"Wicked Sensation"	5:59
15.	"Tooth and Nail"	3:28

== Personnel ==
- Robert Mason – vocals
- George Lynch – guitars
- Anthony Esposito – bass
- Chas Stumbo – drums
