= Massive Grooves from the Electric Church of Psychofunkadelic Grungelism Rock Music =

Massive Grooves...

Studio album by Poundhound (Doug Pinnick)
- Released: 1998
- Genre: Rock
- Label: Metal Blade
- Producer: Doug Pinnick

Poundhound (Doug Pinnick) chronology
Massive Grooves... (1998)	Pineappleskunk (2001)

Professional ratings
Review scores
Source	Rating
AllMusic	4.5/5 stars
Scream Magazine	6/6

Massive Grooves from the Electric Church of Psychofunkadelic Grungelism Rock Music, often known simply as Massive Grooves, is the first solo album by the American musician Doug Pinnick, released under the name of Poundhound.

== Track listing ==
All tracks are written by Doug Pinnick, unless otherwise noted.

No.	Title	Length
1.	"Rev"	0:21
2.	"Jangle"	3:01
3.	"Shake"	3:44
4.	"Music"	3:12
5.	"Love"	3:33
6.	"Darker"	3:10
7.	"Friends"	4:08
8.	"Soul"	2:56
9.	"Supersalad"	3:39
10.	"Psycholove"	2:36
11.	"Blindeye" (Pinnick, Sylvester Stewart)	2:46
12.	"Red"	4:04
13.	"Hey"	5:32
14.	"River"	1:11

The Japanese release has a bonus track.

No.	Title	Length
15.	"Anger"	2:39

== Personnel ==
- Doug Pinnick – all vocals, guitars, and bass
- Chad Lyons – drums on tracks 3, 4, and 11
- Jerry Gaskill – drums on tracks 5, 6, 7, 10, and 12
- Shannon Larkin – drums on tracks 2, 8, 9, 13, and 14
