= The Brotherhood (Lynch Mob album) =

Studio album by Lynch Mob
- Released: September 8, 2017
- Genres: Heavy metal, hard rock
- Length: 57:12
- Label: Rat Pak Records
- Producer: Chris Collier

Lynch Mob chronology
Rebel (2015)	The Brotherhood (2017)	Babylon (2023)

The Brotherhood is the seventh album by American hard rock band Lynch Mob.

== Track listing ==
No.	Title	Length
1.	"Main Offender"	3:58
2.	"Mr. Jekyll and Hyde"	5:28
3.	"I'll Take Miami"	4:27
4.	"Last Call Lady"	5:47
5.	"Where We Started"	5:12
6.	"The Forgotten Maiden's Pearl"	5:04
7.	"Until The Sky Comes Down"	4:55
8.	"Black Heart Days"	5:29
9.	"Black Mountain"	4:33
10.	"Dog Town Mystics"	6:15
11.	"Miles Away"	4:56

Bonus track
No.	Title	Length
12.	"Until I Get My Gold"	3:57

Japanese Bonus track
No.	Title	Length
12.	"Forevermore"	4:58

== Personnel ==
- Oni Logan – vocals
- George Lynch – guitars
- Sean McNabb – bass
- Jimmy D'Anda – drums

== Charts ==
Chart (2017)	Peak position
US Billboard 200	104
US Top Hard Rock Albums (Billboard)	4
US Top Rock Albums (Billboard)	17
