= Syzygy (EP) =

EP by Lynch Mob
- Released: 1998
- Genres: Heavy metal, hard rock
- Length: 14:55
- Label: Sacred Groove Records
- Producers: Anthony Esposito, George Lynch

Lynch Mob chronology
Lynch Mob (1992)	Syzygy (1998)	Smoke This (1999)

Professional ratings
Review scores
Source	Rating
Allmusic	4.5/5 stars

Syzygy is a three-song EP by the American rock band Lynch Mob released in 1998 just after George Lynch left Dokken for another time; Mick Brown decided to stay with Dokken but did perform on the EP. Syzygy saw the return of original Lynch Mob vocalist Oni Logan, and the departure of Robert Mason. The band broke up again after a single writing session, which resulted in Syzygy.

== Track listing ==
No.	Title	Lyrics	Music	Length
1.	"Into the Light"	Anthony Esposito, Don Salter, George Lynch, Oni Logan	George Lynch	5:37
2.	"All Things Must Pass"	Anthony Esposito, Don Salter, Oni Logan	George Lynch	3:56
3.	"Waterfall"	Anthony Esposito, Don Salter, George Lynch, Oni Logan	George Lynch	5:22

== Personnel ==
- Oni Logan – vocals
- George Lynch – guitars
- Anthony Esposito – bass
- Mick Brown – drums

== Additional personnel ==
- Cover Art – Mike Rehmer
- Mixing, Engineering – Mark Matson
