= Oni Logan =

Argentine American singer

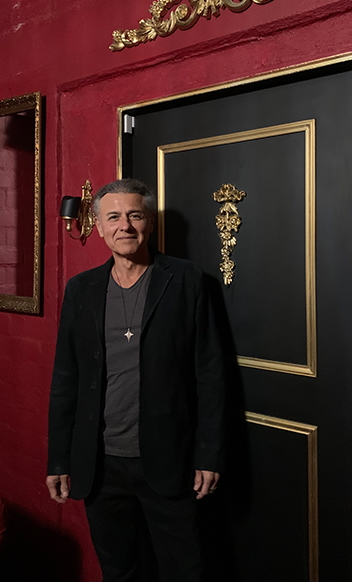

Background information
- Born: Leonardo Gustavo Gimenez; Buenos Aires, Argentina
- Genres: Hard rock, blues rock, alternative rock, Heavy metal, glam metal, gothic rock
- Occupations: Singer; songwriter; musician
- Instruments: Vocals; guitar; percussion
- Years active: 1985-present
- Member of: Lynch Mob; Dio Disciples
- Formerly of: Defiance; Diamond Rose; Ferrari Band; Racer X; Lynch Mob; Violets Demise; Raiding the Rock Vault
- Website: http://www.oniloganofficial.com

Leonardo Gustavo Gimenez, better known by his stage name Oni Logan, is an Argentine American singer, best known as the original lead vocalist of the rock band Lynch Mob. He joined the band in 1989, only to leave after the release of the first album. He rejoined in 1996, then subsequently left and rejoined several times, with his final stint in the band lasting until their 2020 retirement.

== Career ==
Logan was born in Buenos Aires, Argentina, immigrating as a child to the United States. He got his start as lead vocalist for the band Diamond Rose in South Florida from 1985 to 1987. That band consisted of Dave Rhodes (guitar), Mike D'Amico (drums), Marc Wolpert (bass), and Mark "Smitty" Smith (guitar). The band became well-known in South Florida, but Oni left to join another Florida band by the name of Defiance. After a year of performing with them, he was invited to Los Angeles by Marc Ferrari (guitarist of Keel) to become the singer for his new band Ferrari. At the same time Ferrari was starting to form, he was asked to join the band Racer X in a new incarnation featuring all original band members except star guitarist Paul Gilbert, who had at that point left the band to form the band Mr. Big. However, Logan only performed one show with the band when the members decided to go their separate ways. A year later, he was courted by George Lynch, who had recently left Dokken with drummer Mick Brown to form the band Lynch Mob.

In 1990, Lynch Mob released their first album Wicked Sensation, which featured Logan on lead vocals. Shortly after finishing touring, Logan and band decided to part ways, as Logan was struggling with his voice strength in live shows much to Lynch's dismay. Afterwards, Robert Mason soon replaced Logan on vocals.

Upon leaving the Lynch Mob, there was a deal waiting for Logan with Atlantic Records. Logan formed the band Violets Demise with former Dio guitarist Rowan Robertson, 21-year-old Scot Coogan, and bassist Spencer Campbell. The group recorded their first album with producer Dave Jerden, but was never released because of personnel changes in the record company. The unreleased Violets Demise album circulated on the Internet and has since become a popular bootleg. In 2001, album was self-released under the name Logan/Robertson, titled Revisited.

Before resurfacing in L.A. clubs with his band Head Set, Logan took a hiatus from the music business and spent 7 years living in Switzerland. He has a daughter (born c. 2002). In 2005, after having started in a new musical direction, Logan released his first solo album, Stranger in a Foreign Land, which featured a different musical sound for the vocalist. Logan wrote all the songs on his album as well.

Logan was one of many guest vocalists featured on Liberty N' Justice's 2006 album Soundtrack of a Soul. Logan sings "Show Me the Way," the seventh track on the record.

Logan reunited for a tour with Lynch Mob in 2008, and appears on the band's 2009 Smoke and Mirrors album. According to an interview with George Lynch, the record is "the natural evolution of where 'Wicked Sensation' would have went [sic] with Oni had we done a second record." Logan was set to sing on the 2011 Lynch Mob tour, but reportedly two hours before Lynch Mob were set to hit the road, there was a discrepancy regarding money. Chas West replaced Logan on the tour.

Logan re-joined Lynch Mob in early 2012 and was the co-songwriter and vocalist on the 2012 Sound Mountain Sessions EP. He also toured with Lynch Mob promoting the EP in the summer of 2012. In 2014, Logan partnered with George Lynch again to record an EP titled Sun Red Sun, which was released in October 2014. Logan and Lynch subsequently signed a recording contract with Frontiers Records, releasing two more full-length albums as Lynch Mob, Rebel (2015) and The Brotherhood (2017). Logan departed the band once again in early 2018 announcing that he would be putting together a new recording and touring project.

Since 2012, Oni has also toured with The DIO Disciples, consisting of various members of the band Dio. In May 2013, Logan performed in Las Vegas with Raiding the Rock Vault, substituting for Paul Shortino. In October 2022 he returned to the show, now playing at the Rio Hotel & Casino.

In 2023, Oni released a new EP titled "The Cosmic Trust Sessions" via on his website http://www.oniloganofficial.com/ Available only as a physical CD purchase. The EP was recorded in March 2022 featuring musicians Jimmy Zollo on guitars, Drew Zollo on bass and Matt Laug on drums, who has been touring with AC/DC since 2023.

In 2024, Oni was a guest on "The Chuck Shute Podcast" YouTube channel for his first ever podcast interview.

In 2025, Oni was recently a guest on "Appetite for Distortion Podcast" YouTube channel.

== Personal life ==
He also has a young daughter named Delilah Marie.

== Discography ==
=== Lynch Mob ===
- Wicked Sensation (1990)
- Syzygy (1998)
- Smoke and Mirrors (2009)
- Sound Mountain Session EP (2012)
- Unplugged: Live from Sugarhill Studios (2013)
- Sun Red Sun (2014)
- Rebel (2015)
- The Brotherhood (2017)
- Wicked Sensation (Reimagined) (2020)

=== Logan/Robertson ===
- Revisited (2001)

=== Running Wild ===
- The Brotherhood (2002)

=== Oni Logan ===
- Stranger in a Foreign Land (2005)
- The Cosmic Trust Sessions EP (2023)

=== Liberty N' Justice ===
- Soundtrack of a Soul (2006)

=== Misc. ===
Ronnie James Dio: This Is Your Life (2014, featuring Jimmy Bain, Rowan Robertson, and Brian Tichy, covering "I")

Steve Saluto - "12" EP (2013) Featuring Oni Logan, Brian Tichy, Steve Saluto and Thomas Nero.
