= George Lynch (musician) =

American guitarist

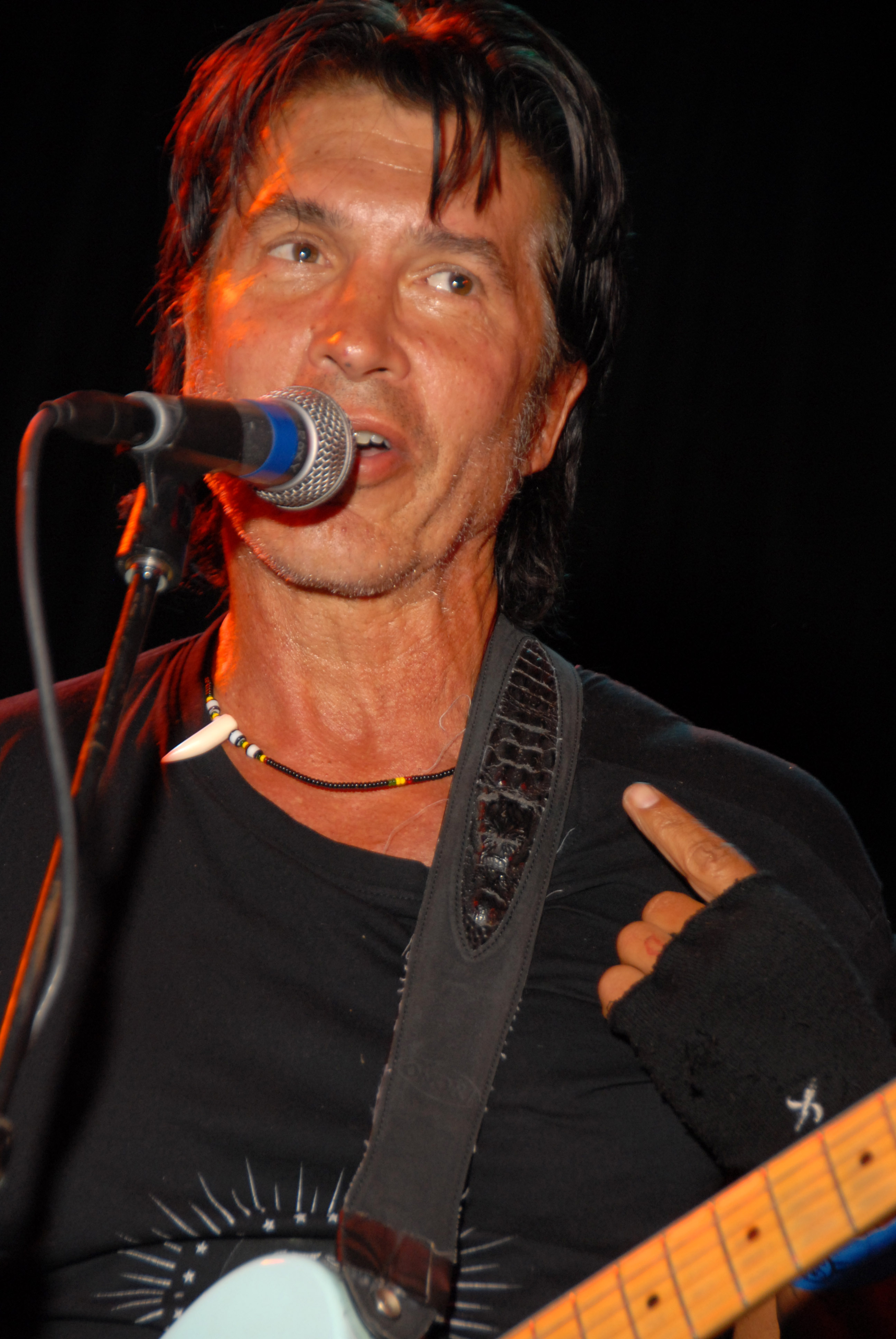
- Lynch in 2009

Background information
- Born: September 28, 1954 (age 72); Spokane, Washington, U.S.
- Genres: Hard rock; glam metal; heavy metal; neoclassical metal; instrumental rock
- Occupations: Musician, songwriter
- Instrument: Guitar
- Years active: 1977–present
- Member of: Dokken, Lynch Mob, The End Machine
- Website: georgelynch.com

George Lynch (born September 28, 1954) is an American guitarist, best known for his work with the hard rock and heavy metal band Dokken and his post-Dokken solo band Lynch Mob. He is regarded as one of the most renowned and influential metal guitarists of the 1980s, noted for his distinctive playing style and sound.

He is ranked No. 47 on the list of the "100 Greatest Guitarists of All Time" by Guitar World magazine and No. 10 on the "Top 10 Metal Guitarists of All Time" by Gibson.

== Early life ==
Lynch was born in Spokane, Washington, and made the small town of Auburn, California his home base between 1971 and 1975.

== Career ==
=== 1970s ===
During the late 1970s, Lynch played with a band called The Boyz, performing on Hollywood's Sunset Strip alongside Van Halen and Quiet Riot. The Boyz also included future Dokken drummer Mick Brown, bassist Monte Zufelt, and vocalists Lisa Furspanker and Greg Sanford. Their sound, along with Lynch's playing, resembled Van Halen's so closely that one of their demos circulated as a purported "pre-Roth Van Halen recording". The Boyz were scheduled to perform a showcase for Gene Simmons and his startup label, but Van Halen opened the show, prompting Simmons to leave before seeing The Boyz. Lynch subsequently formed Xciter before eventually joining Dokken.

Lynch auditioned twice for the role of lead guitarist for Ozzy Osbourne — first in 1979, ultimately losing the position to Randy Rhoads. Lynch commented, "I won the consolation prize. Randy got to tour with Ozzy ... and I got to teach at his mom's school." He auditioned again in 1982 to replace Brad Gillis. According to Lynch, he was initially hired for three days before Osbourne changed his mind, deciding to go with Jake E. Lee. Lee mentioned that Lynch "got the gig, but only went on the road for two weeks to watch the show and never actually played with Ozzy." Lynch later explained that he participated in soundchecks at the side of the stage during a European tour with Osbourne and Brad Gillis as part of an extended audition. He also rehearsed with the band in Texas but was dismissed by Osbourne when the band moved its operations to Los Angeles. Jake E. Lee auditioned on the day of Lynch's dismissal, and while Lee reportedly didn’t perform his best, his appearance was preferred, securing him the position. Osbourne dismissed Lynch on the spot in front of Lee, whom Lynch had just met. This decision deeply affected Lynch, who was struggling financially at the time and working as a liquor store delivery driver, a job that required him to keep his hair short. Sharon Osbourne favored Lee's "look" over Lynch's playing, a preference that likely influenced Osbourne's decision.

=== Dokken and Lynch Mob ===
Dokken released a series of successful platinum albums that prominently featured Lynch's innovative lead guitar work. The instrumental track "Mr. Scary" on Back for the Attack increased his popularity among guitarists. The band received a Grammy nomination for Best Metal Performance in 1990.

The group disbanded in March 1989 due to internal conflicts with lead vocalist Don Dokken. Lynch then formed his own hard rock band, Lynch Mob, which differed from Dokken in lyrical and guitar complexity, subject matter, song structure, and tuning. Lynch took a break when his wife, Christy Lynch, gave birth to their daughter, Mariah Lynch.

Lynch released his first solo album, Sacred Groove, in 1993.

In 1994, after Don Dokken, Jeff Pilson, and Mick Brown reunited, they decided to bring Lynch back for a full Dokken reunion. The reformed band signed with Columbia/Sony and, following extensive writing sessions, released Dysfunctional. The album, however, did not meet expectations, leading to the band being dropped from the label. Dokken subsequently signed with CMC International and released One Live Night, an "unplugged" show recorded in late 1994.

In 1996, the band entered the studio with producer Kelly Gray, who aimed to take Dokken in a new direction. The resulting album, Shadowlife, marked a shift from their melodic rock roots to a more alternative sound, a change that disappointed vocalist and founder Don Dokken.

Tensions reignited between Don Dokken and Lynch in 1997, resulting in Lynch's replacement by former Europe guitarist John Norum. Lynch subsequently reformed Lynch Mob, which recorded and demoed three songs later released as an EP titled Syzygy. However, vocalist Logan opted to pursue other projects before a full album could be completed, and Mick Brown chose to remain with Dokken. In 1998, Lynch organized a brief 13-show U.S. tour for Lynch Mob, with Artension frontman John West, bassist Anthony Esposito, and others.

When that lineup disbanded, Lynch chose to take Lynch Mob in a new direction. The band adopted a fresh look, lineup, and musical style that appealed to a younger audience. They released the album Smoke This in 1999. After the supporting tour, Lynch decided to put Lynch Mob on hold for a few years, though he toured in late 2001 with the band’s original singer Oni Logan, L.A. Guns bassist Chuck Garric, and BulletBoys drummer Jimmy D'Anda.

=== Post-2001 projects ===
Lynch began collaborating with producer/engineer Sean Fodor on the ill-fated Microdot project, which featured then-unknown vocalist London LeGrand in early 2002. Only a few songs from that project have been released: "Bulldog Tyranny" on The Lost Anthology and three other songs that Lynch later released as The Lynch That Stole Riffness, with Robert Mason taking over on vocals.

Lynch reformed Lynch Mob in late 2002, featuring original bassist Anthony Esposito and Robert Mason. Lynch Mob recorded an album of re-recorded classic Lynch songs from Dokken and Lynch Mob, updated to a more contemporary (post-2000) approach and sound.

Lynch formed a project with former Dokken bassist Jeff Pilson, releasing the Wicked Underground album in 2003 under the name Lynch/Pilson. That same year, Lynch assembled The George Lynch Group, with which he has continued to record and tour regularly. The George Lynch Group performed a marathon of 26 shows in 30 days, including a much-talked-about feature on The Tonight Show with Jay Leno. This line-up featured Lynch, vocalist Andrew Freeman, drummer Vinny Appice (Black Sabbath, Dio), and Mårten Andersson (Lizzy Borden, Starwood, Legacy). The 2005 album Furious George is a cover album, featuring classic rock tunes from The Beatles, Bob Dylan, Deep Purple, Grand Funk Railroad, Led Zeppelin, Montrose, Robin Trower, and ZZ Top

Let the Truth Be Known was released under the band name Souls of We in 2008 and features the line-up of London LeGrand (vocals), Johnny Chow (bass), and Yael (drums), along with a myriad of guest contributions.

Lynch embarked on a tour in early fall 2008 with a reformed Lynch Mob, featuring original singer Oni Logan, bassist Marco Mendoza, and drummer Scot Coogan. A new Lynch Mob album, titled Smoke and Mirrors, was released in October 2009, with Logan handling lead vocals.

In 2009, Lynch recorded lead and rhythm guitar tracks for seven songs that appear on the debut album of rock singer Raven Quinn. The self-published album was released on March 4, 2010.

Lynch toured in the spring of 2010 with Souls of We and spent the summer and winter touring with Lynch Mob. In the summer of 2010, Souls of We changed their line-up and were forced to discontinue using the name.

Lynch appeared on the tribute album Siam Shade Tribute for the Japanese rock band Siam Shade in 2010.

Lynch currently resides near Los Angeles, where he created an instructional guitar website, The Guitar Dojo.

Lynch produces his own custom hand-built art guitars, marketed under the Mr. Scary Guitars brand, which he crafts himself at the ESP Guitars USA custom shop facility.

=== Second Dokken reunion and T&N ===
George Lynch and Jeff Pilson joined Mick Brown and Don Dokken for two songs during an encore at a Dokken show at The House of Blues in Anaheim on November 29, 2009. Lynch subsequently announced a reunion of Dokken's "glory days" line-up, but the announcement was retracted on February 24. Lynch released a statement on his website claiming that Don did not want the reunion to occur.

T&N was formed from three-fourths of the classic Dokken line-up: Lynch, Jeff Pilson, and Mick Brown. They announced plans for a studio album to be released in 2012. The trio's original name was Tooth & Nail, but it was shortened to T&N in March 2012. The band released the album Slave to the Empire on October 31, 2012.

=== Recent activities ===
Lynch announced plans for a documentary film titled Shadowtrain: Under A Crooked Sky about the destruction of the Native American community in the fall of 2011. A crowdfunding campaign was launched in March 2013 to complete the project. The movie was still a work in progress as of late 2014.

Lynch assembled Shadowtrain, featuring documentary filmmaker and drummer Vincent Nicastro, Pueblo Native American vocalist Gregg Analla (Tribe of Gypsies, Slaviour, Seventhsign), ex-Lynch Mob bassist Gabe Rosales, and keyboardist Donnie Dickman.

Lynch's all-star project with vocalist/bassist Doug Pinnick and drummer Ray Luzier, known as KXM, released its debut album in 2014.

Lynch announced another project titled The Infidels, featuring Pancho Tomaselli, Sal Rodriguez, and rapper Sen Dog.

Lynch co-founded the supergroup Sweet & Lynch with Stryper frontman Michael Sweet. Their first album, titled Only to Rise, was released on January 27, 2015, on Frontiers Records. The recording lineup features James Lomenzo (formerly of White Lion and Megadeth) on bass, and Brian Tichy (formerly of Whitesnake and Foreigner) on drums. The duo released a second album, Unified, on November 10, 2017, followed by Heart & Sacrifice in 2023.

Lynch teamed up with Living Colour vocalist Corey Glover to form the side project Ultraphonix, releasing the album Original Human Music in 2018.

In 2019, Lynch reunited with former Dokken bassist Jeff Pilson in the band The End Machine. The band released their self-titled debut in 2019 and their second album, The End Machine: Phase 2, in 2021. According to a 2021 interview with Pariah Burke, the band represents an intentional return to Lynch's classic sound. In 2020, the album Dirty Shirley was released, preceded by two singles.

In 2023, Lynch released a side project called The Banishment, a collaboration between George Lynch, programmer and multi-instrumentalist Joe Haze, and vocalist Devix Szell. On March 10, The Banishment released their debut album, Machine And Bone. The album features a duet titled "Max Pain" with Szell and Richard Patrick of FILTER, "The Dread" by Jason Charles Miller (produced by Stewart Cararas), and the song "Terror" by Tommy Victor from PRONG. To promote the project, The Banishment recorded an official music video for one of the tracks titled "Got What You Wanted." The video was directed by Devix Szell and produced by Sabrina Oertle.

== Equipment ==
Lynch used Charvel and Kramer guitars prior to 1986, most notably their tiger stripe guitars. He has endorsed ESP Guitars since then. His unique "Skull and Bones" guitar (affectionately named "Mom") was designed and hand-crafted by artist John 'J. Frog' Garcia. Since George was contracted by ESP at the time, an ESP decal was applied to the headstock. Several George Lynch signature guitars have been produced by ESP Japan:

- The ESP Kamikaze model, based on his first ESP guitar
- The Tiger model, a homemade Strat constructed from a stock of parts George bought from Charvel in the 1980s
- The Skull & Snakes, a design later used for the Lynch Mob "Wicked Sensation" album artwork
- The Flame Boy, based on an ESP Forest design
- The New Super V, which includes distressed hardware and features a new "Super V" pickup
- The Ultra Tone, the first ESP guitar that George designed himself
- The Serpent, an ESP model released and used in the 1990s

Lynch briefly endorsed PRS Guitars in the early 1990s. He can be seen using two different colored Custom 24 models. He also endorsed the hand-crafted Yamaha L-Series acoustic guitars and used these on the Asian 'Unplugged' clinic tour in May/June 2006.

Lynch is currently signed with ESP Guitars, which has resulted in the creation of the Lynch Jumbo acoustic, featuring graphics designed by Stephen Jensen.

Lynch's use of Marshall, Soldano, Bogner, and Diezel amps, along with effects units to achieve his famous tone, is well documented in rock guitar circles. His rig changes with each successive tour. Lynch used the Randall Dragon (non-master volume) tube head for the majority of his sound while on tour in 2005. The design was similar to the older Marshall Plexi heads he used early in the Dokken era.

Lynch is a long-time endorser of Randall Amplification and participated in the design of the George Lynch Box for Randall's modular amp system.

Seymour Duncan created the Screamin' Demon guitar pickup (SH-12 and TB-12) for Lynch, which is featured on all the ESP Lynch signature guitars. Seymour Duncan also recently designed the new Super V pickup to be featured in the Super V model.

Lynch also uses a Morley A/B box called the Tripler and a limited edition Robert Keeley GL Time Machine boost.

Zoom released the G2g George Lynch pedal in 2008.

Lynch designed a new high-nickel content string through the Dean Markley company with his name on the packaging. He later switched over to D'Addario strings.

== Influences ==
Lynch cited several influential guitarists as key inspirations in his musical development, including Jimi Hendrix, Edward Van Halen, Jeff Beck, and Michael Schenker. He also acknowledges the impact of Randy Rhoads, Allan Holdsworth, Jan Akkerman, Christopher Parkening, Al Di Meola, Roy Buchanan, Albert King, Frank Marino, Muddy Waters, Gary Moore, and Yngwie Malmsteen. These artists have shaped his approach to guitar playing and songwriting throughout his career.

== Discography ==
Dokken

- Breaking the Chains (1981)
- Tooth and Nail (1984)
- Under Lock and Key (1985)
- Back for the Attack (1987)
- Beast from the East (1988)
- Dysfunctional (1995)
- One Live Night (1996)
- Shadowlife (1997)
- From Conception: Live 1981 (2007)
- Return to the East Live (2016)
- The Lost Songs: 1978—1981 (2020)

Lynch Mob

- Wicked Sensation (1990)
- Lynch Mob (1992)
- Syzygy (1998)
- Smoke This (1999)
- Evil: Live (2003)
- REvolution (2003)
- REvolution: Live! (2006)
- Smoke and Mirrors (2009)
- Sound Mountain Sessions (2012)
- Unplugged: Live from Sugarhill Studios (2013)
- Sun Red Sun (2014)
- Rebel (2015)
- The Brotherhood (2017)
- Babylon (2023)
- Dancing With The Devil (2025)

Solo

- Sacred Groove (1993)
- Will Play for Food (2001)
- Stone House (2001)
- The Lynch That Stole Riffness! (2002)
- Furious George (2004)
- The Lost Anthology (2005)
- Guitar Slinger (2007)
- Scorpion Tales (2008)
- Orchestral Mayhem (2010)
- Kill All Control (2011)
- Legacy EP (2012)
- Shadow Train (2015)
- Seamless (2021)
- Guitars at the End of the World (2023)

Udo Lindenberg

- Keule (1982)

Hear 'n Aid

- Stars (1986)

Tony MacAlpine

- Maximum Security (1987)

Lynch/Pilson

- Wicked Underground (2003)
- Heavy Hitters (2020)
- Heavy Hitters II (2023)

Xciter

- Xciter (2006)

Lana Lane

- Gemini (2006)

Souls of We

- Let the Truth Be Known (2008)

George Lynch & The Stahlwerksinfonie Orchestra

- Christmas / Sarajevo (2009)

Raven Quinn

- Raven Quinn (2010)

Willie Basse

- Break Away (2010)

T&N

- Slave to the Empire (2012)

KXM

- KXM (2014)
- Scatterbrain (2017)
- Circle of Dolls (2019)

Sweet & Lynch

- Only to Rise (2015)
- Unified (2017)
- Heart and Sacrifice (2023)

Project Nfidelikah

- Project Nfidelikah (2016)

Ultraphonix

- Original Human Music (2018)

Disney Super Guitar

- Hellfire (2018)

The End Machine

- The End Machine (2019)
- The End Machine: Phase 2 (2021)
- The End Machine: The Quantum Phase (2023)

Dirty Shirley

- Dirty Shirley (2020)

Casandra’s Crossing

- Garden Of Earthly Delights (2024)
