= Sacred Groove =

Studio album by George Lynch
- Released: September 10, 1993
- Genre: Heavy metal Hard rock
- Length: 46:59
- Label: Elektra
- Producer: John Cuniberti

George Lynch chronology
Sacred Groove (1993)	Will Play for Food (2000)

Sacred Groove is a George Lynch album from 1993. It contains a diverse range of tracks from different styles of music, for example, the instrumental 'Tierra Del Fuego' has a significant Latin feel to it. There are four instrumentals and six songs on the US release. The Japanese release has an additional instrumental as well as a bluesy live track. A notable instrumental on the album is "Love Power from the Mama Head", which shows off much of Lynch's unique playing style.

Professional ratings
Review scores
Source	Rating
Allmusic	3.5/5 stars

== Track listing ==
There are ten tracks on the US release and twelve tracks on the Japanese release of this album:

Track	Track title	Duration	Notes
1	Memory Jack	1:37	Instrumental
2	Love Power From the Mama Head	5:29	Instrumental
3	Flesh and Blood	5:02	Vocal: Ray Gillen
4	We Don't Own This World	4:26	Vocal: Matthew and Gunnar Nelson
5	I Will Remember	4:18	Instrumental
6	The Beast Part I	6:54	Vocal: Mandy Lion
7	The Beast Part II (Addiction to the Friction)	2:49	Vocal: Mandy Lion
8	Not Necessary Evil	5:15	Glenn Hughes
9	Cry of the Brave	5:05	Glenn Hughes
10	Tierra Del Fuego	6:03	Instrumental Tommy Henriksen Bass Guitar
11	Satan's Shorts	7:19	* Japanese release only - Instrumental
12	If You Love Me (Why Don't You Let Me Go)	4:22	* Japanese release only - Live
