= Runaway Brides =

Studio album by Brides of Destruction
- Released: September 13, 2005
- Recorded: February–Summer 2005
- Genre: Hard rock, alternative metal, glam metal, post-grunge
- Length: 49:38
- Label: Shrapnel
- Producer: Tracii Guns, Andy Johns

Brides of Destruction chronology
Here Come the Brides (2004)	Runaway Brides (2005)

Singles from Runaway Brides
- 1. "White Trash" Released: 2005

Runaway Brides is the second and final studio album by Brides of Destruction released via Shrapnel Records on September 13, 2005. Nikki Sixx left the band to rejoin Mötley Crüe in January 2005 for a reunion tour supporting a greatest hits compilation but still has writing credits on the album. Amen bassist Scott Sorry was chosen as his replacement. Ginger of The Wildhearts joined as second guitarist but soon left not before contributing writing to four album tracks.

== Background and recording ==
After Brides founder, Nikki Sixx, left the band to rejoin Mötley Crüe for a reunion tour the Brides were expected to go on hiatus, however co-founder Tracii Guns decided to continue without Sixx bringing in former Amen bassist Scott Sorry as his replacement. Tracii then added Ginger of The Wildhearts to the band as the second guitarist. The band then started writing new material for the album but soon after, Ginger departed the Brides stating he couldn't focus on the band:

'When I realized that I wasn't gonna really be able to put 100 percent into that, I figured it would be fair to tell them sooner rather than later that I wasn't gonna be able to do it. I don't believe in messing people about, so I told the guys. I mean, they were gonna get me a work visa, and they were gonna pay me for shows and stuff… I just figured I'm not gonna take a penny if I'm not gonna last the duration – I believe in being straight with people. . . It's important to salvage friendships, especially in the face of adversity in the shape of money and music – I don't wanna lose friendships because of money or music. So I decided that I'd rather be these guys' friend forever than start an album that I wasn't gonna finish, or start a tour that I wasn't gonna finish. It was pretty much the same as THE WILDHEARTS back home. I knew I wasn't gonna be able to finish an album, so I told them before we even started. 'Guys, I ain't quittin' before the end, I'm quittin' before the beginning. This is as fair as it could possibly be. And bad news isn't gonna feel good whenever you find it out, so it's best to find it out sooner rather than later.'

Andy Johns, who had previously worked with Tracii on the L.A. Guns album Waking the Dead, was brought in to produce the album, which at this point was titled 13 Acres, but eventually Johns left the project, citing unspecified differences with the band, with the rest of the album being produced by Tracii. The band chose White Trash as their first single with the video using footage sent in from fans stating that "the video footage they are looking for should feature the "trailer-park, white-trash look", or be along the lines of the Jackass videos. If you like NASCAR, trailers, wrestling or anything else in that realm and you caught it on video, the band want it." Album track Dime’s in Heaven was written as a tribute to recently deceased Pantera and Damageplan guitarist Dimebag Darrell. The album, now titled Runaway Brides after being suggested to Tracii by Nikki Sixx, was initially to be released with Sanctuary, the band signed a new deal with Shrapnel Records, with the album given a release of September 13 in Europe and September 27 in the US.

== Release ==
Upon release, Runaway Brides failed to match its predecessor and did not chart as well as first single White Trash. The band toured the US in support of the album with Adema, featuring former Brides drummer Kris Kohls, and Trashlight Vision and also Europe with support from Tigertailz. It was during this time that Scott Sorry departed and was replaced by guitar/bass tech Jeremy Guns and Dazzle Rebel of Red Star Rebels for the shows. Despite assurances, it looked likely that the Brides were to split up, with Tracii joining Quiet Riot, a move that was to be short lived after he parted ways less than a month later.

Tracii announced he was to perform a 'Best Of" tour with former L.A. Guns members Paul Black on vocals, Nickey Alexander on drums and former Brides live member Jeremy Guns rounding up the lineup on bass. With The Tracii Guns Band touring, the Brides were put on indefinite hiatus in 2006.

== Critical reception ==
Professional ratings
Review scores
Source	Rating
Allmusic	3.5/5 stars
Sputnikmusic	(2.1/5)
Metal-Temple	3/5 stars
Pyro Music	(6.2/10)

Reviews for the album were fairly positive with Allmusic again given giving a Brides album a 3.5/5 rating stating "What you get is an album that follows the direction of the debut – raw, in your face, guitar-riff rock, with lyrics that usually focus on the darker side of life, as evidenced by the Motörhead-esque "Dead Man's Ruin" and the Guns N' Roses-esque "White Trash.". Metal-Temple gave the album 3 out of 5 stars saying "There is more than one style the bands trying to present. I saw Sleaze Metal in this album, I witnessed a tension for a Monster Magnet "vibe", I assumed Grunge was taking its toll at some point. Not to forget, Guns N' Roses lurks somewhere in there also..."

== Track listing ==
All tracks are written by Tracii Guns, London LeGrand, Scot Coogan, Scott Sorry, except where noted

No.	Title	Writer(s)	Length
1.	"Aunt Biente"	Guns	1:08
2.	"Lords of the Mind"		4:21
3.	"Deadmans Ruin"		3:00
4.	"Criminal"	Guns, LeGrand, Coogan, Sorry, Nikki Sixx	4:11
5.	"This Time Around"	Guns, LeGrand, Coogan, Sorry, Sixx	4:01
6.	"White Trash"	Guns, LeGrand, Coogan, Sorry, Ginger	3:45
7.	"Brothers"		3:26
8.	"Never Say Never"	Guns, LeGrand, Coogan, Sorry, Ginger	5:13
9.	"Blown Away"	Guns, LeGrand, Coogan, Sorry, Sixx	2:55
10.	"Porcelain Queen"		4:22
11.	"White Horse"		3:13
12.	"Tunnel of Love"	Guns, LeGrand, Coogan, Sorry, Ginger	4:38
13.	"Dime’s in Heaven"	Guns, LeGrand, Coogan, Sorry, Ginger	5:10

== Personnel ==
Brides of Destruction

- London LeGrand – Lead Vocals
- Tracii Guns – Lead guitar, Backing vocals
- Scott Sorry – Bass
- Scot Coogan – Drums

Additional personnel

- Nikki Sixx – Writing Credits on "Criminal", "This Time Around" and "Blown Away"
- Ginger – Writing Credits on "White Trash", "Never Say Never", "Tunnel of Love and "Dimes in Heaven"
- Tod Waters; Album Illustration, Design & Layout
- William Hames – Album photography

Production personnel

- Andy Johns – production
- Tracii Guns – production
