= Ray Luzier =

American drummer (born 1970)

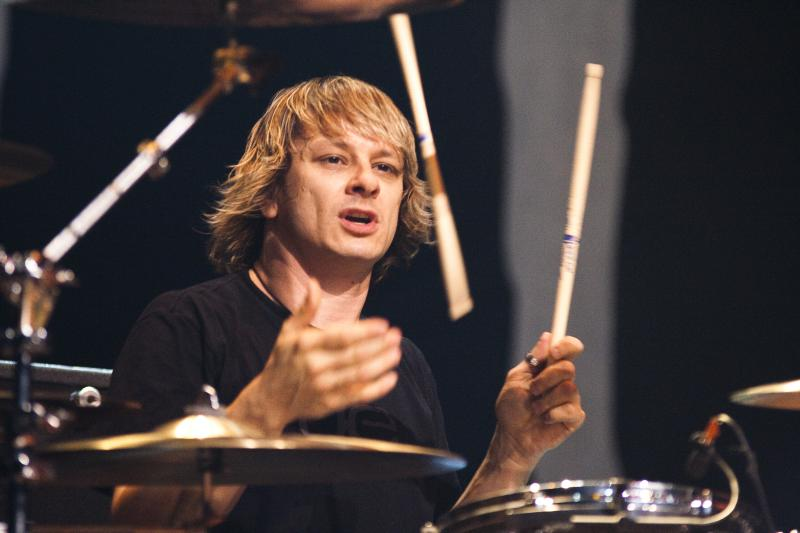
- Luzier performing with Korn in 2010

Background information
- Born: Raymond Lee Luzier; June 14, 1970 (age 56); Pittsburgh, Pennsylvania, U.S.
- Origin: West Newton, Pennsylvania, U.S.
- Genres: Heavy metal; alternative metal; nu metal; industrial metal; hard rock; funk
- Occupation: Musician
- Instruments: Drums; percussion
- Years active: 1988–present
- Member of: Korn; KXM
- Formerly of: Army of Anyone; The David Lee Roth Band; Tracy G; Billy Sheehan; Bang Tango; The Nixons; Steel Panther; Jonathan Davis and the SFA
- Website: kornofficial.com

Raymond Lee Luzier (born June 14, 1970) is an American musician. He is the drummer of the nu metal band Korn, becoming a full-time member of the band in April 2009.

== Life and career ==
Luzier was raised in West Newton, Pennsylvania, a small town an hour outside of Pittsburgh on a 118-acre farm. He began playing drums at age five, and participated in high school jazz, concert, and marching bands. After graduating in 1988, Luzier moved to Hollywood, California, to pursue an education at the Musicians Institute. He graduated in 1989 with a degree from MI's Percussion Institute of Technology. Luzier later returned as an instructor at Musicians Institute (1992–2001), where he taught rock-style drumming classes and gave private lessons.

Luzier is well known for his work with David Lee Roth, for whom he played drums from 1997 to 2005. Luzier has also played with the Hideous Sun Demons, a progressive-rock/fusion trio formed with DLR bandmembers, guitarist Toshi Hiketa and bassist James LoMenzo. Luzier became the drummer for Steel Panther shortly after the band formed in 1997. He remained with Steel Panther for six years until his DLR touring schedule interfered. In 2004, Luzier released an instructional DVD. It features a wide variety of lessons, including double-kick technique, drum fills, motion exercises, and warm-ups. It was released through Hal Leonard Publishing Co.

In January 2006, Luzier appeared at the NAMM Show in Anaheim, California with Hiketa and Billy Sheehan. Robert DeLeo and Dean DeLeo of Stone Temple Pilots appeared at the same NAMM venue as part of an impromptu band put together by Steve Ferrone. After seeing Luzier's performance, the DeLeo brothers invited Luzier to join Army of Anyone, the band they were putting together with vocalist Richard Patrick of the band Filter.

In 2007, after original drummer David Silveria had left (in 2006), Korn hired many touring drummers including Joey Jordison of Slipknot. Jordison left due to preparation for the recording of Slipknot's new album All Hope Is Gone. Consequently, Korn was then looking for a new drummer; and Luzier reportedly flew to Seattle to audition for Korn with James "Munky" Shaffer and Reginald "Fieldy" Arvizu. When told to learn only five of their songs, Luzier learned 30. At his audition, Luzier was immediately invited to join Korn.

Luzier played his first show with Korn on January 13, 2008, in Dublin, Ireland, and played with the band throughout 2008. Korn recorded their ninth studio album together with Luzier and their original producer Ross Robinson. Korn frontman Jonathan Davis said in March 2009 that Luzier was now an official member of the band. Luzier made "UltimateRockGods" Artist Of The Month for July.

Luzier also played live with Stone Temple Pilots for a couple of the band's shows on their reunion tour in October filling in for drummer Eric Kretz, who took time off due to the death of his father. In November 2010, Luzier played drums for the Japanese pop group KAT-TUN on their song "Change UR World." It was Kat-Tun's thirteenth number one single on the Oricon charts.

In 2014, he released the self-titled CD,"KXM" with his side project KXM, which consisted of Luzier, ex-Dokken and Lynch Mob guitarist George Lynch, and King's X vocalist and bassist Doug Pinnick.

Luzier has two sons, born in 2011 and 2015.

== Equipment ==
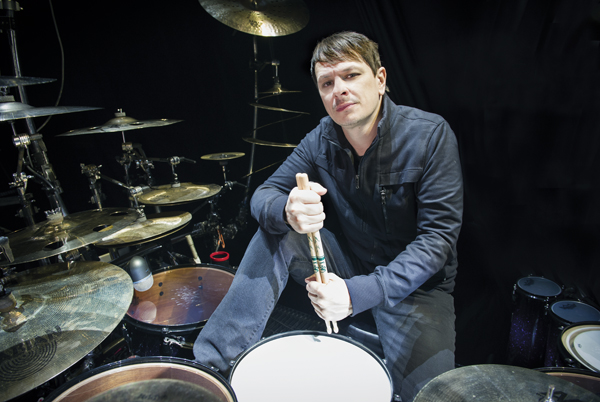
Luzier in 2014

Luzier's kit changes to fit the style of the artist he performs or records with. He currently endorses Pearl Drums, Sabian cymbals, Evans drumheads, DW hardware, Vic Firth drumsticks, and Factory Metal Percussion Cymbals. He previously endorsed ddrum, Orange County Drum and Percussion (OCDP), Remo drumheads and Promark drumsticks.

== Discography ==
=== David Lee Roth ===
Studio Albums

- 1998: DLR Band
- 2003: Diamond Dave

=== Army of Anyone ===
Studio Albums

- 2006: Army of Anyone

=== Korn ===
Studio albums

- 2010: Korn III: Remember Who You Are
- 2011: The Path of Totality
- 2013: The Paradigm Shift
- 2016: The Serenity of Suffering
- 2019: The Nothing
- 2022: Requiem

EPs

- 2009: Korn Digital EP #1
- 2010: Korn Digital EP #2
- 2010: Korn Digital EP #3

Compilation albums

- 2008: Nightmare Revisited, (track 10 "Kidnap the Sandy Claws")

=== Jonathan Davis and the SFA ===
- 2011: "Alone I Play / Live at the Union Chapel"

=== KXM ===
Studio albums

- 2014: KXM
- 2017: Scatterbrain
- 2019: Circle of Dolls

=== Other releases ===
- 2018: Black Labyrinth, Jonathan Davis
- 2010: Change Ur World - Kat-Tun with Luzier on drums
- 2009: A Song for Chi, Various artists
- 2008: Billy Sheehan "Holy Cow"
- 2008: Repo! The Genetic Opera Official Soundtrack
- 2008: Goaded "To Die Is Gain"
- 2006: Billy Sheehan "Cosmic Troubadour"
- 2005: Goaded "Goaded"
- 2003: "Hideous Sun Demons"
- 2002: "Honky MoFo" (featuring Ricky Wolking)
- 2002: Tracy G "Deviating from the Setlist"
- 2001: Tracy G "Katt Gutt"
- 2001: Zac Maloy Band
- 2001: Jason Becker Tribute CD
- 2001: Freak Power Ticket "Rock Hard Compilation"
- 2000: Driven 4 Song Promo Cd With Tracy G
- 1999: Tracy G's "Driven"
- 1998: Medicine Wheel "Small Talk"
- 1998: Mike Hartman "Black Glue"
- 1998: Freak Power Ticket
- 1997: Medicine Wheel "Immoral Fabric"
- 1996: Jeffology (Tribute to Jeff Beck) with Jake E. Lee
- 1995: Darren Housholder "Symphonic Aggression"
- 1994: Hard Rock Magazine Compilation CD. Band: Medicine Wheel
- 1994: Wicked Alliance "Twisted Beatuty Demos"
- 1994: Michael Lee Firkins "Howling Iguanas"
- 1994: Metal Edge Compilation "Best of L.A."
- 1994: Medicine Wheel "First Things First"
- 1993: T.J. Martell Foundation Benefit CD. Band: Ivory Tower
- 1993: Darren Housholder "Generator Man"
- 1993: Toby Knapp "Guitar Distortion"
- 1993: Tony Fredianelli "Breakneck Speed"
- 1993: Shrapnel Guitar Greats Compilation
- 1993: Concrete Foundations Forum Compilation
- 1992: Darren Housholder
- 1990: 9.0 "Too Far Gone"
