= Evil: Live =

Live album by Lynch Mob
- Released: 2003
- Recorded: 1992
- Genres: Heavy metal, hard rock
- Length: 73:09
- Label: Sacred Groove

Lynch Mob chronology
Smoke This (1999)	Evil: Live (2003)	REvolution (2003)

Evil: Live is a live album released by the American rock band Lynch Mob in 2003.

== Track listing ==
No.	Title	Length
1.	"River of Love"	4:46
2.	"Wicked Sensation"	6:02
3.	"I Want It"	4:45
4.	"Cold Is the Heart"	5:27
5.	"She's Evil but She's Mine"	5:36
6.	"Dance of the Dogs"	4:01
7.	"Jungle of Love"	3:50
8.	"The Secret"	4:49
9.	"All I Want"	5:16
10.	"No Good"	5:40
11.	"Dream Until Tomorrow"	7:45
12.	"Tangled in the Web"	4:31
13.	"Street Fighting Man"	6:08
14.	"Tie Your Mother Down" (Queen cover)	4:33

== Personnel ==
- Robert Mason – vocals
- George Lynch – guitars
- Anthony Esposito – bass
- Mick Brown – drums

== Additional personnel ==
- Peter Towler – Design, Photography
- Don C. Tyler – Digital Remastering
