= Let the Truth Be Known =

Studio album by Souls of We
- Released: May 27, 2008; November 4, 2008 re-release
- Recorded: Hensen Studios, Lynch Box Studio, Optimum Sound, The Office Studio, Stonehouse
- Genre: Hard rock, heavy metal
- Length: 58:11; 61:27 re-release
- Label: Shrapnel Records
- Producer: George Lynch, London LeGrand

Alternate Cover
- Re-release

Professional ratings
Review scores
Source	Rating
Allmusic	3/5 stars

Let the Truth Be Known is the debut album by hard rock supergroup Souls of We released on May 27, 2008 via the group's official website with the first 1000 copies, with blues musician Robert Johnson inspired album artwork, signed by members London LeGrand and George Lynch. The album was later released on November 4 of the same year, through Shrapnel Records, under the moniker "George Lynch's Souls of We" with new album artwork, a rearranged track listing as well the additional track "Nork 13". The album was self-produced in various studios around Los Angeles and mixed by Mudrock, who has worked with bands such as Avenged Sevenfold and Godsmack.

The album features guest appearances by Andrew Freeman of Lynch Mob, Jeff Pilson of Dokken and Dio, Frédéric Leclercq of DragonForce, Patrick Johansson of Yngwie Malmsteen, Bobby Jarzombek of Riot and Halford, session drummer Mike Hansen and Morgan Rose of Sevendust.

On October 26, 2009 a video was released for album track called 'Skeleton Key'.

== Track listing ==
=== Original ===
All songs written by George Lynch and London LeGrand

No.	Title	Length
1.	"January"	4:51
2.	"Skeleton Key"	3:42
3.	"Key of Noise"	4:35
4.	"Push It"	4:17
5.	"Gandhi's Got a Gun"	4:39
6.	"Psycho Circus"	4:16
7.	"Crawling"	4:15
8.	"Everything I Want"	4:51
9.	"Adeline"	5:21
10.	"St. Jude"	5:01
11.	"Sorry to Say"	4:14
12.	"Under the Dead Tree"	4:20
13.	"Let the Truth Be Known"	3:49

=== Re-release ===
No.	Title	Length
1.	"Let the Truth Be Known"	3:49
2.	"January"	4:51
3.	"Skeleton Key"	3:42
4.	"Everything I Want"	4:51
5.	"Key of Noise"	4:35
6.	"Sorry to Say"	4:14
7.	"Crawling"	4:15
8.	"St. Jude"	5:01
9.	"Gandhi's Got a Gun"	4:39
10.	"Push It"	4:17
11.	"Psycho Circus"	4:16
12.	"Nork 13"	3:16
13.	"Adeline"	5:21
14.	"Under the Dead Tree"	4:20

== Personnel ==
Souls of We

- London LeGrand – vocals
- George Lynch – guitar
- Johny Chow – bass
- Ya'el – drums

Additional personnel

- Andrew Freeman – additional vocals
- Jeff Pilson – additional bass
- Frédéric Leclercq – additional bass
- Patrick Johansson – additional drums
- Bobby Jarzombek – additional drums
- Morgan Rose – additional drums
- Mike Hansen – additional drums
- Alex Solca – album photography
- Ravi Dosaj – album design and layout

Production personnel

- George Lynch – producer
- London LeGrand – producer
- Mike Tacci – engineer
- Brett Chasson – engineer
- Yuri Nation – engineer
- Rob Tarango – engineer
- Mudrock – mixing
- Dave Schultz – mastering
