= Rebel (Lynch Mob album) =

Studio album by Lynch Mob
- Released: August 21, 2015
- Genres: Heavy metal, hard rock
- Length: 57:12
- Label: Frontiers Records
- Producers: George Lynch, Chris Collier

Lynch Mob chronology
Sun Red Sun (2014)	Rebel (2015)	The Brotherhood (2017)

Professional ratings
Review scores
Source	Rating
AllMusic	4.5/5 stars
Blabbermouth	4/5 stars
MelodicRock.com	4.25/5 stars

Rebel is the sixth album by American hard rock band Lynch Mob.

== Track listing ==
No.	Title	Lyrics	Music	Length
1.	"Automatic Fix"	Oni Logan	Donnie Dickman, George Lynch	5:47
2.	"Between the Truth and a Lie"	Logan	Lynch	3:52
3.	"Testify"	Logan	Lynch	5:14
4.	"Sanctuary"	Logan	Lynch	3:47
5.	"Pine Tree Avenue"	Logan	Lynch	3:29
6.	"Jelly Roll"	Logan	Lynch	3:31
7.	"Dirty Money"	Logan	Lynch	3:56
8.	"The Hollow Queen"	Logan	Lynch	4:38
9.	"The Ledge"	Logan	Dickman, Lynch	5:21
10.	"Kingdom of Slaves"	Logan	Lynch	5:42
11.	"War"	Logan	Lynch	5:59

Japanese edition bonus tracks
No.	Title	Length
12.	"Live It Up"	3:42

== Personnel ==
- Oni Logan – vocals
- George Lynch – guitars
- Jeff Pilson – bass
- Brian Tichy – drums

== Charts ==
Chart (2015)	Peak position
US Top Hard Rock Albums (Billboard)	15
US Top Rock Albums (Billboard)	39
