= Smoke This =

Studio album by Lynch Mob
- Released: October 19, 1999
- Genres: Nu metal, rap metal
- Length: 61:59
- Label: SGR
- Producer: George Lynch

Lynch Mob chronology
Syzygy (1998)	Smoke This (1999)	Evil: Live (2003)

Professional ratings
Review scores
Source	Rating
AllMusic	3/5 stars
Collector's Guide to Heavy Metal	3/10
Kerrang!	3/5 stars

Smoke This is the third studio album by American rock band Lynch Mob, released in 1999. After the second breakup of the original lineup in 1998, George Lynch reformed the band with all unknown members, taking the music into a rap metal/nu metal direction.

== Track listing ==
No.	Title	Length
1.	"World Spinning Away"	4:19
2.	"Hype-O"	5:40
3.	"Chromeplated"	5:17
4.	"Hollow"	6:28
5.	"Playalistics"	4:30
6.	"Beg"	4:45
7.	"Relaxin' in the Land of AZ"	6:09
8.	"Get It Together"	5:55
9.	"Indra's Net"	3:57
10.	"When I Rise"	6:16
11.	"What Do You Want"	3:48
12.	"Smoke This"	4:55

== Personnel ==
- Kirk Harper – vocals
- George Lynch – guitars
- Gabe Rosales – bass
- Clancy McCarthy – drums

Additional personnel

- Mike Rehmer – art direction
- Tom Baker – mastering
