= Lynch Mob (album) =

Studio album by Lynch Mob
- Released: April 28, 1992
- Genres: Heavy metal, hard rock, blues metal
- Length: 57:12
- Label: Elektra
- Producer: Keith Olsen

Lynch Mob chronology
Wicked Sensation (1990)	Lynch Mob (1992)	Syzygy (1998)

Professional ratings
Review scores
Source	Rating
Allmusic	3/5 stars
Raw	3/5 stars

Lynch Mob is the second album by American hard rock band Lynch Mob, and the first album to feature vocalist Robert Mason following the departure of Oni Logan. Logan was fired shortly after touring in support of the band's first album due to his life style that negatively impacted his ability to perform. There were also rumors that he had quit the band while touring in support of Queensrÿche, because he felt intimidated opening up for singer Geoff Tate. In a 1992 interview with Headbangers Ball, Lynch talked highly of Mason and stating, "Mason tracked us down, saying he had to be the singer for the band. He knew he was right for the group. He flew himself out. He was very much the opposite of the last singer. He's very dedicated, has a lot of confidence in his abilities and can definitely take control of an audience".

Due to the rise of the grunge movement and changing musical trends, the album resulted in poorer sales figures than the previous album. However, it has received some positive critical reviews. The album also includes a cover of "Tie Your Mother Down", a song originally released by the British rock band Queen in 1976.

== Track listing ==
No.	Title	Lyrics	Music	Length
1.	"Jungle of Love"	Mick Brown/Robert Mason/Anthony Esposito/Keith Olsen	George Lynch	3:50
2.	"Tangled in the Web"	Brown/Mason/Esposito/Olsen	Lynch	4:40
3.	"No Good"	Brown/Mason/Esposito/Olsen	Lynch	4:20
4.	"Dream Until Tomorrow"	Brown/Mason/Esposito/Olsen	Lynch	6:07
5.	"Cold is the Heart"	Brown/Mason/Esposito/Olsen	Lynch	5:28
6.	"Tie Your Mother Down"	Brian May	Brian May	3:50
7.	"Heaven is Waiting"	Brown/Mason/Esposito/Olsen	Lynch	3:56
8.	"I Want It"	Brown/Mason/Esposito	Lynch	4:52
9.	"When Darkness Calls"	Brown/Mason/Esposito	Lynch	5:26
10.	"The Secret"	Brown/Mason/Esposito/Olsen	Lynch	5:06

Japanese edition bonus tracks
No.	Title	Length
11.	"Love in Your Eyes"	4:01
12.	"Love Finds a Way"	3:37

== Personnel ==
- Robert Mason – vocals
- George Lynch – guitars
- Anthony Esposito – bass
- Mick Brown – drums

=== Additional personnel ===
- Jerry Hey, Larry Williams – horns
- Richard Baker – keyboards
- Glenn Hughes – backing vocals

== Charts ==
Chart (1992)	Peak position
Japanese Albums (Oricon)	21
US Billboard 200	56
