= Wicked Sensation =

Studio album by Lynch Mob
- Released: October 23, 1990
- Recorded: 1989
- Genre: Heavy metal; glam metal; hard rock
- Length: 57:12
- Label: Elektra
- Producer: Max Norman

Lynch Mob chronology
Wicked Sensation (1990)	Lynch Mob (1992)

Singles from Wicked Sensation
- 1. "River of Love" Released: 1990; 2. "Wicked Sensation" Released: 1990; 3. "No Bed of Roses" Released: 1990

Professional ratings
Review scores
Source	Rating
AllMusic	4.5/5 stars

Wicked Sensation is the debut album by American rock band Lynch Mob. It was George Lynch's first release since leaving Dokken. Mick Brown, also from Dokken, played drums. Oni Logan provided vocals, harmonica, and contributed lyrics, while Anthony Esposito was recruited on bass. The album had two successful singles, with "River of Love" climbing to the No. 19 spot on Billboard's Mainstream Rock chart and "Wicked Sensation" reaching No. 31.

== Track listing ==
No.	Title	Lyrics	Music	Length
1.	"Wicked Sensation"	Oni Logan	George Lynch	4:40
2.	"River of Love"	Logan, Lynch, Anthony Esposito, Max Norman	Lynch	4:22
3.	"Sweet Sister Mercy"	Logan	Lynch	3:40
4.	"All I Want"	Logan, Esposito, Mick Brown	Lynch	5:03
5.	"Hell Child"	Logan	Lynch	4:49
6.	"She's Evil But She's Mine"	Logan, Lynch	Lynch	5:09
7.	"Dance of the Dogs"	Logan, Lynch, Esposito, Brown	Lynch	3:45
8.	"Rain"	Logan	Lynch	4:52
9.	"No Bed of Roses"	Logan	Lynch, Norman	4:20
10.	"Through These Eyes"	Logan, Lynch, Esposito	Lynch	5:15
11.	"For a Million Years"	Logan, Lynch	Lynch	6:17
12.	"Street Fightin' Man"	Logan, Esposito	Logan, Lynch	4:48

== Personnel ==
Lynch Mob

- Oni Logan – vocals
- George Lynch – guitars
- Anthony Esposito – bass
- Mick Brown – drums

Technical

- Max Norman – production, engineering, mixing
- Neil Kernon – vocal engineering
- David Thoener – mixing on tracks (2, 8, 10)
- Bob Ludwig – mastering

== Charts ==
Chart (1990)	Peak position
Japanese Albums (Oricon)	33
US Billboard 200	46

== See also ==
- 1990 in music
- George Lynch
