= Scot Coogan =

American musician

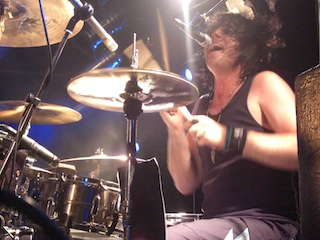

Background information
- Also known as: The Coogiemonster
- Born: 23 April 1971 (age 55)
- Origin: Chicago, IL, United States
- Genres: Hard rock, heavy metal, glam metal
- Occupation: Musician
- Instruments: Drums, Vocals, Guitar, Bass guitar, Piano
- Years active: 1990-Present
- Labels: Atlantic, Columbia, Giant, Interscope, Island, Mercury, Sanctuary, Universal
- Website: www.scotcoogan.com

Scot Coogan is an American musician known for his accomplished drumming and vocal skills, working as both a session and touring musician. Scot resides in Las Vegas, Nevada, where he records, performs and has worked as a counselor at Rock and Roll Fantasy Camp.

Coogan has worked with groups such as Brides of Destruction featuring Nikki Sixx, Ace Frehley, Violets Demise, Ednaswap, Parade of Losers, Annetenna, Sinéad O'Connor, Peter Yorn, Vanilla Ice, and Otep. Aside from drums, he sings, plays guitar, bass and piano.

Coogan's most recent gig was as the drummer in the Ace Frehley band.

== Career ==
In 2004, Coogan gained prominence as a member of Brides of Destruction, a heavy metal band consisting of Tracii Guns, Nikki Sixx, and London LeGrand. He has also played with Stephen Pearcy in the band Rat Bastards as well as a Beatles/Led Zeppelin cover band named 6 Foot Nurse.

In December 2007, Coogan joined Ace Frehley's band and appears on Frehley's 2009 release, Anomaly. He performed as Ace's Drummer and Vocalist on the 2008 Rocket Ride World Tour, 2010 Anomaly World Tour, 2011 No Regrets US Tour and at many music festivals in both the United States and Europe through 2012. Scot was the touring drummer for the 2015 tour.

In 2009, Coogan recorded Lynch Mob's Smoke and Mirrors album and toured Australia with the band. Coogan toured with a reformed Lynch Mob from 2011 until mid 2012 and recorded, co-produced and co-wrote the Lynch Mob EP Sound Mountain Sessions.

From June 2012 through September 2012, Coogan was the drummer and backing vocalist for Lita Ford on the "Rock of Ages Tour", an extensive arena tour featuring Def Leppard, Poison and Lita Ford in support of the movie Rock of Ages.

In December 2012, Coogan became a "Rock Star Counselor" at Rock and Roll Fantasy Camp, where he has had the opportunity to perform with Roger Daltrey, Alice Cooper, Sammy Hagar, Dave Navarro, Stephen Perkins, Steve Vai, John5, Howard Leese, Billy Sheehan, Kip Winger, Kane Roberts, Rudy Sarzo, Phil Soussan, Vinny Appice, Teddy Adreadis, Joe Vitale, Tony Franklin and John Moyer.

In February 2013 at Rock and Roll Fantasy Camp, Coogan reunited with both Ace Frehley and George Lynch, performing with them at the MGM Grand Las Vegas. Future recordings with both artists and Coogan are being planned for 2013–2014.

25 June 2013 Bret Michaels Jammin' with Friends was released, featuring Scot Coogan and Mark McGrath on the track "Talk Dirty To Me".

Scot Coogan is a professional touring & session musician, songwriter and producer hailing from Chicago, IL, best known for his accomplished drumming and vocal skills. Scot appears on over 30 original recordings including the multi-platinum Spider-Man soundtrack and most recently as a guest vocalist on Bret Michaels (Poison) 2013 release Jammin' With Friends. Coogan has toured the world as a member of the Ace Frehley Band (original Kiss Guitarist), Brides of Destruction (with Nilkki Sixx – Mötley Crüe & Tracii Guns – LA Guns & Raiding the Rock Vault), Lynch Mob (George Lynch – Dokken), and many others. Since relocating to Las Vegas earlier this year, Scot has performed as a guest or featured artist with popular local bands The Limit, Tinnitus, Uberschall, Unique Massive, Sin City Kiss, Vinyl Tattoo, Lust of Kiss and the Rock N' Roll Rebels. Scot is currently a performer with Blue Man Group and a Rock Star Counselor at Rock and Roll Fantasy Camp. Later this year, Scot will begin hosting and performing late night, exclusive events with his critically acclaimed Led Zeppelin/Beatles cover band, 6 Foot Nurse.

Scot uses CRUSH and Tama Drums, Remo drumheads, Zildjian cymbals, and Vic Firth signature drumsticks.
