= Lynch Mob (band) =

American hard rock band

- Origin: California, U.S.
- Genres: Hard rock; heavy metal; glam metal
- Years active: 1989–1994, 1998–1999, 2003–2006, 2008–2020, 2022–present
- Labels: Elektra; CMC; Sacred Groove; Deadline; Frontiers; Rat Pak
- Members: George Lynch; Brian Tichy; Andrew Freeman; Jaron Gulino
- Past members: See here

Lynch Mob is an American hard rock band, formed in 1989 by former Dokken guitarist George Lynch, who is the band's only permanent member.

== History ==
=== 1989 formation ===
Lynch Mob was formed in 1989, from the remains of Lynch's former band, Dokken. The band original line-up also featured Dokken's drummer, Mick Brown. The first Lynch Mob album was released in 1990, titled Wicked Sensation.

The title track, along with "River of Love," "She's Evil But She's Mine," and "For a Million Years" were archetypes of the 1980s glam metal scene. However, with the waning popularity of the genre, the album did not gain a widespread audience. Vocalist Oni Logan was fired shortly after the tour, as his lifestyle had negatively impacted his ability to perform. According to a Rockshowmagazine interview with former bassist Anthony Esposito, he explained that Logan was not a great performer live and Lynch decided to go with a different singer on their follow up, a self-titled album.

The next album, Lynch Mob (released in 1992), fared worse upon its release due to the explosion of alternative rock. The album had anthemic numbers such as "Tangled in the Web" and a cover of Queen's "Tie Your Mother Down". The album featured new vocalist Robert Mason, despite attempts to re-unite with Oni Logan.

Lynch Mob disbanded after the album tour, and in 1995 Lynch and drummer Mick Brown reunited with Dokken.

=== 1998 reunion ===
In 1998, Lynch and Don Dokken fell out again over control and money relative to the Dokken band. Consequently, Lynch attempted to reform the original Lynch Mob line-up. This line-up did reunite but broke up again after a single writing session, although the fruits of this session were a three-song demo that was released as Syzygy. A Lynch Mob tour of 13 U.S. cities followed in 1998 featuring vocalist John West and bassist Anthony Esposito.

=== "Smoke This" era and second break-up ===
Lynch then formed the third incarnation of the group with new and unknown members taking the music into a rap metal and nu metal direction. In 1999, Smoke This was released to disappointed fans and critics. According to Lynch, fans referred to the Smoke This album as "Lynch Bizkit". A tour followed the album and the group disbanded again.

=== 2003 reunion and third break-up ===
In 2003, vocalist Robert Mason, original bassist Anthony Esposito and Lynch reformed to record modernized Lynch Mob and Dokken material. Mick Brown stayed with Dokken, and Michael Frowein was hired as the drummer. The new recordings on the album, titled REvolution, were heavier and faster than the originals. Frowein was replaced by Chas Stumbo (ex-Earshot) for the 2003 REvolution Tour. A live CD/DVD package of the final show of that tour was later released, although the audio was from a different performance and often does not match the images.

George Lynch toured Europe in 2006 under his own name and focused on his 'Guitar Dojo' online lessons. In 2007, George and his solo band performed a marathon 26-show/30-day tour, which included an appearance on The Tonight Show with Jay Leno. The line-up was: George Lynch - guitars, Andrew Freeman - vocals, Vinny Appice (Black Sabbath/Dio) - drums, and Marten Andersson (Lizzy Borden, Steelheart) - bass.

Lynch later started a new band, Souls of We.

=== 2008 reunion to moniker retirement ===
The popular lineup of Dokken was set to reunite to play Rocklahoma 2008 in Pryor, Oklahoma and tour during the summer, however, those plans fell apart. George used this chance to reunite Lynch Mob (with original vocalist Oni Logan) to play at Rocklahoma 2008 sans Esposito and Brown. As of January 2009, Oni Logan and George Lynch rejoined to form another incarnation of the band, releasing Smoke and Mirrors in 2009, featuring Marco Mendoza on bass. A tour followed, with Fred Coury on drums. Drummer Brian Tichy joined Lynch Mob in 2010.

Anthony Esposito played bass on tour with former Kiss guitarist Ace Frehley and was featured on his 2009 release Anomaly, Mick Brown still does shows playing drums with Dokken and Ted Nugent, and Robert Mason is currently Warrant's lead singer.

Bassist James Lomenzo joined Lynch Mob in late July 2010, replacing Marco Mendoza. James previously jammed with Lynch Mob drummer Brian Tichy in both Pride & Glory and Slash's Snakepit.

Two shows (August 26, 2010 in Calgary, Alberta, and August 27, 2010 in Edmonton, Alberta) saw Marq Torien (Bullet Boys) handle the vocal duties. Keith St. John (Montrose and Burning Rain) replaced Marq Torien on vocals for the last two U.S. dates on the tour.

Bassist Robbie Crane of Ratt joined the touring line up of Lynch Mob for the band's fall of 2010 European tour. Crane become the permanent bassist of Lynch Mob thereafter, but on September 17, 2012, a press release stated that after two years he had resigned from the band.

Dokken drummer Mick Brown reunited with Lynch Mob for the first time in 15 years on a full U.S. tour, in January 2011.

George Lynch stated on Eddie Trunk's radio show that a new Lynch Mob album would be recorded with Oni Logan, Mick Brown, and Jeff Pilson. No release date was set. On "That Metal Show" in April 2012, George stated the new Lynch Mob album would be entitled I Am Weapon and was close to being finished.

On June 6, Scot Coogan, then current Lynch Mob drummer, posted that he would be the drummer for Lita Ford on her upcoming tour. It was then announced that Lynch Mob had tapped Brian Tichy (Whitesnake) as its new touring drummer for the upcoming summer shows in support of the band's new release.

On June 19, Deadline Music/Cleopatra Records were due to release a special three-disc audio/video deluxe collection of Lynch Mob's REvolution. The set features the full-length studio album REvolution with supercharged renditions of classic Dokken/Lynch Mob tracks such as "Tooth and Nail", "Breaking the Chains", "Wicked Sensation", and more. It also includes professionally filmed live performances recorded during the 2005 REvolution tour, mixed in 5.1 surround sound. These have been previously released, as separate packages, in 2003 and 2004 respectively.

In August 2020, George Lynch revealed he was no longer going to release music or tour with the band's name due to its racial connotations. However, in October 2022, Lynch resumed performing under the Lynch Mob moniker. In August 2023, Lynch announced a new album, Babylon, the first since 2017’s Brotherhood, to be released on October 20.

On January 19, 2024, Lynch Mob announced that they will be embarking on a year-and-a-half long farewell tour, titled The Final Ride, in celebration of their 35th anniversary. The tour began on February 1, 2024 in Warrendale, Pennsylvania and concluded on March 22, 2025 in Medina, Minnesota.

=== 2025 farewell album and encore performances ===
On October 10, 2025, Lynch Mob announced that they will be releasing their final studio album, Dancing with the Devil, on November 28. They also announced they will be playing a series of "encore performances", despite already completing their farewell tour earlier in the year.

== Members ==
=== Current ===
- George Lynch – guitars, backing vocals (1989–present)
- Andrew Freeman – lead vocals (2003, 2010, 2019, 2025–present)
- Brian Tichy – drums (2010, 2012–2013, 2015, 2020, 2025–present)
- Jaron Gulino – bass, backing vocals (2022–present)

=== Former ===
- Oni Logan – Lead vocals, percussion (1989–1991, 1996, 1998, 2001, 2008–2011, 2012–2013, 2014–2018, 2020)
- Jimmy D'Anda – drums, backing vocals (2001–2002, 2013–2014, 2015–2018, 2022–2025)
- Robert Mason – lead vocals, acoustic guitar, percussion (1991–1994, 2003–2006, 2018)
- Keith St John – lead vocals (2010, 2013–2014)
- John West – lead vocals (1998–1999)
- Kirk Harper – lead vocals (1999)
- Christopher C. Romero – lead vocals (2011)
- Chas West – lead vocals (2011–2012)
- Nathan Utz – lead vocals (2018-2019)
- Anthony Esposito – bass (1989–1994, 1998, 2003–2006)
- Gabe Rosales – bass (1999)
- Marten Andersson – bass (2003–2007, 2011)
- Marco Mendoza – bass, backing vocals (2008–2010)
- James LoMenzo – bass (2010)
- Michael Devin – bass (2010, 2020)
- Kevin Baldes – bass (2013–2015)
- Jeff Pilson – bass (2015)
- Sean McNabb – bass (2015–2019)
- Mick Brown – drums (1989–1994, 1998, 2011)
- Clancy McCarthy – drums (1999)
- Michael Frowein – drums (2003)
- Chas Stumbo – drums (2003)
- John Macaluso – drums (2004)
- Vinny Appice – drums (2005-2007)
- Tommy Aldridge – drums (2008)
- Fred Coury – drums (2008–2009)
- Scot Coogan – drums, backing vocals (2009–2011, 2011–2012, 2013, 2014–2015, 2018–2019) (touring)
- Robbie Crane – bass (2010–2014, 2020)
- Gabriel Colon – lead vocals (2022–2025)

== Discography ==
=== Studio albums ===
| Album | Details | Peak chart positions | | | Sales |
| Album | Details | US | US Rock | US Hard Rock | Sales |
|---|---|---|---|---|---|
| Wicked Sensation | Released: 1990; Label: Elektra Records | 46 | — | — | |
| Lynch Mob | Released: April 28, 1992; Label: Elektra Records | 56 | — | — | |
| Smoke This | Released: October 19, 1999; Label: Koch Records | — | — | — | |
| REvolution | Released: April 29, 2003; Label: Cleopatra Records | — | — | — | |
| Smoke and Mirrors | Released: October 13, 2009; Label: Frontiers Records | — | — | — | |
| Rebel | Released: August 7, 2015; Label: Frontiers Records | — | 39 | 15 | |
| The Brotherhood | Released: September 8, 2017; Label: Rat Pak Records | 104 | 17 | 4 | |
| Babylon | Released: October 20, 2023; Label: Frontiers Records | | | | |
| Dancing with the Devil | Released: November 28, 2025; Label: Rat Pak Records | | | | |
"—" denotes releases that did not chart

=== Live albums ===
- Evil: Live (2003)
- REvolution: Live! (2006)
- The Final Ride Live (2025)

=== EPs ===
- Syzygy (1998)
- Sound Mountain Sessions (2012)
- Unplugged: Live from Sugarhill Studios (2013)
- Sun Red Sun (2014)

=== Singles ===
| Year | Title | Mainstream Rock | Album |
|---|---|---|---|
| 1990 | "River of Love" | 19 | Wicked Sensation |
| 1990 | "Wicked Sensation" | 31 | Wicked Sensation |
| 1990 | "No Bed of Roses" | - | Wicked Sensation |
| 1992 | "Dream Until Tomorrow" | 23 | Lynch Mob |
| 1992 | "Tangled in the Web" | 13 | Lynch Mob |
| 1999 | "Smoke This" | - | Smoke This |
