= Michael Del Zotto =

Canadian ice hockey player (born 1990)

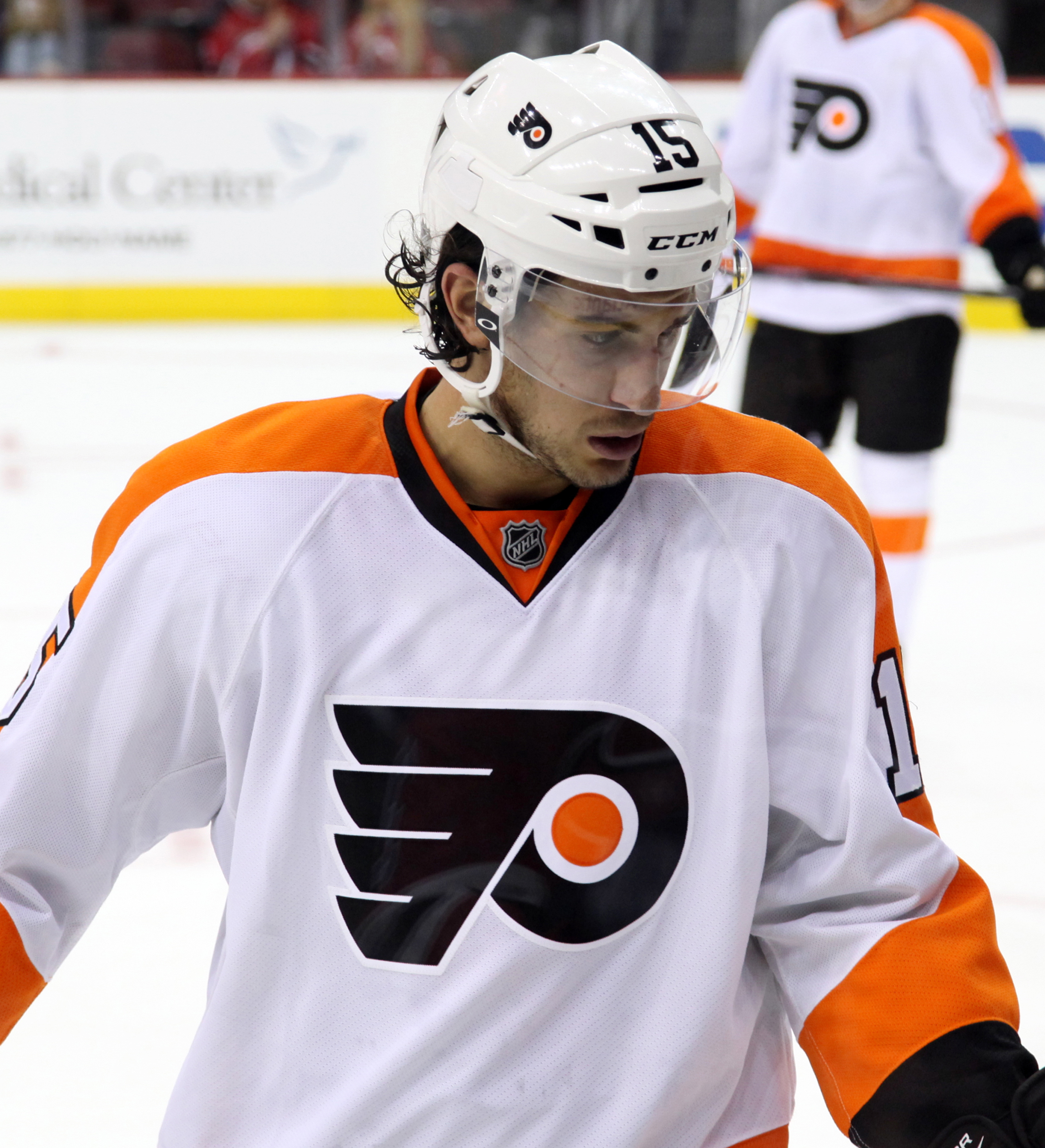
- Del Zotto with the Philadelphia Flyers in 2014
- Born: June 24, 1990 (age 36) Whitchurch-Stouffville, Ontario, Canada
- Height: 6 ft 0 in (183 cm)
- Weight: 194 lb (88 kg; 13 st 12 lb)
- Position: Defence
- Shot: Left
- Played for: New York Rangers; Nashville Predators; Philadelphia Flyers; Vancouver Canucks; Anaheim Ducks; St. Louis Blues; Columbus Blue Jackets; Ottawa Senators
- National team: Canada
- NHL draft: 20th overall, 2008; New York Rangers
- Playing career: 2009–2023

Michael Del Zotto (born June 24, 1990) is a Canadian former professional ice hockey defenceman. He was drafted in the first round, 20th overall, by the New York Rangers at the 2008 NHL entry draft. He played in the NHL for the Rangers, Nashville Predators, Philadelphia Flyers, Vancouver Canucks, Anaheim Ducks, St. Louis Blues, Columbus Blue Jackets, and the Ottawa Senators. Del Zotto won the Stanley Cup in 2019 with St. Louis.

== Playing career ==
=== Early career ===
Del Zotto played minor ice hockey with the Stouffville Clippers in the A league of the Whitchurch-Stouffville Minor Hockey Association. He then played for the Richmond Hill Stars and the Markham Waxers in the Ontario Minor Hockey Association's Eastern AAA League. His Waxers team also featured Steven Stamkos, Cody Hodgson and Cameron Gaunce. The group won eight consecutive OMHA titles from 1999 to 2006 and the OHL Cup in Minor Midget. He played in the 2003 Quebec International Pee-Wee Hockey Tournament with Markham.

Del Zotto was the second overall selection by the Oshawa Generals in the 2006 Ontario Hockey League Priority Selection.

=== Junior ===
During his first season with the Oshawa Generals in the OHL, Del Zotto helped his home province of Ontario win the gold medal in the 2007 Canada Winter Games.

In his second season with Oshawa, Del Zotto's 63 points ranked him third among OHL defencemen. He made his second OHL playoff appearance in 2008, when the Generals reached the third round. Del Zotto was then chosen for the 2008 Canadian Hockey League (CHL) Top Prospects Game. At the end of the season, on June 20, Del Zotto was selected in the first round, 20th overall, of the 2008 NHL entry draft by the New York Rangers.

On January 8, 2009, the Generals traded Del Zotto along with teammates John Tavares and Daryl Borden to the London Knights in exchange for prospects Christian Thomas, Scott Valentine, Michael Zador and six draft picks.

=== Professional ===
After the 2008–09 OHL season concluded, Del Zotto signed a professional contract with the New York Rangers on May 26, 2009. On October 2, he made his NHL debut against the Pittsburgh Penguins. At age 19, he became the youngest defenceman in Rangers history to play on an opening night. Del Zotto scored his first NHL goal the next day, against Pascal Leclaire of the Ottawa Senators, in the Rangers' home opener at Madison Square Garden. Del Zotto proved he was an asset to the team, and, as a result, averaged 20 to 25 minutes per game throughout the 2009–10 season.

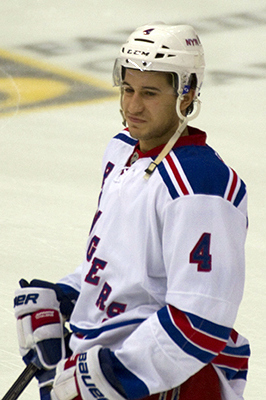
Del Zotto with the New York Rangers in 2010.

Del Zotto was awarded the NHL's Rookie of the Month award for October 2009 after posting 12 points in his first 14 professional games. Placing second in scoring amongst all rookie defencemen with 37 points in 80 games, Del Zotto was also named to the 2010 NHL All-Rookie Team.

In his second professional season, 2010–11, Del Zotto struggled to reproduce his rookie season form consistently, and was subsequently assigned to the Rangers' American Hockey League (AHL) affiliate, the Connecticut Whale, on January 4, 2011. However, he was later recalled by the Rangers, and finished the NHL season with 11 points in 47 games during his split year. During the 2011–12 season, Del Zotto rebounded in a highly-successful year for New York to complete his second full season in the NHL, scoring ten goals and 31 assists in 77 games.

As a restricted free agent during the 2012–13 NHL lock-out, Del Zotto signed a temporary contract with Rapperswil-Jona Lakers of the Swiss National League A on October 31, 2012. In nine games for the Lakers, Del Zotto produced two goals and seven points before returning to North America in anticipation for the shortened 2012–13 season. Upon a resolution to the NHL lock-out, Del Zotto signed a two-year contract extension with the Rangers on the opening day of training camp on January 13, 2013.

On January 22, 2014, Del Zotto was traded to the Nashville Predators in exchange for defenceman Kevin Klein. Del Zotto finished the season with the Predators with just one goal and five points from 25 games. With the final year of his contract completed, and despite being a restricted free agent, Del Zotto was not tendered a new contract offer by Nashville, and he subsequently became a free agent.

On August 5, 2014, Del Zotto signed a one-year, $1.3 million contract with the Philadelphia Flyers. Following the 2014–15 season, Del Zotto became a restricted free agent under the NHL Collective Bargaining Agreement. The Flyers made him a qualifying offer to retain his NHL rights and, on July 5, 2015, Del Zotto filed for salary arbitration. The two sides came to an agreement on contract of two years, $7.75 million before the arbitration hearing.

On July 1, 2017, as an unrestricted free agent, Del Zotto signed a two-year contract with the Vancouver Canucks worth $6 million. In the 2017–18 season, Del Zotto played in a career-high 82 games and collected 6 goals and 16 assists for 22 points. He led the Canucks in ice time (1,706 minutes) and joined Henrik Sedin as the only two Vancouver players to play every game that season.

In the final year of his contract with the Canucks in the 2018–19 season, Del Zotto was unable to replicate his previous season form, producing just four points through 23 games. On January 16, 2019, Del Zotto was traded by the Canucks to the Anaheim Ducks in exchange for Luke Schenn and a seventh-round pick in the 2020 NHL entry draft. He made his debut with the Ducks in a 5–1 defeat to the St. Louis Blues on January 23, 2019. Del Zotto notched his 600th NHL appearance in a 2–1 defeat to the Calgary Flames on February 22, 2019. He featured in 12 games with the Ducks, collecting 3 assists before he was moved on at the trade deadline by Anaheim to add depth to the St. Louis Blues in exchange for a sixth-round pick in 2020 on February 25, 2019. Del Zotto was a part of the extended Blues playoff roster, and watched from the press box as they won their first Stanley Cup in franchise history on June 12, 2019. His name appears on the Cup due to playing more than 41 games over the season (though only 7 with St Louis).

On July 16, 2019, Del Zotto returned to the Ducks, agreeing to a one-year, $750,000 contract. Del Zotto appeared in 49 games, scoring two goals and 15 points.

Prior to the delayed 2020–21 season, Del Zotto was signed to a pro-tryout contract with the Columbus Blue Jackets on December 25, 2020. In the midst of the Blue Jackets training camp, Del Zotto impressed to secure a one-year, two-way contract on January 10, 2021. As a regular on the blueline with the Blue Jackets, Del Zotto featured in 53 out of 56 regular season games, collecting four goals and 13 points, however was unable to prevent Columbus from missing the playoffs.

On July 28, 2021, Del Zotto continued his journeyman career, and signed a two-year, $3 million contract with the Ottawa Senators. However, the organization was unhappy with his play and placed him on waivers on December 10, 2021. He cleared waivers the following day and was sent to Ottawa's AHL affiliate, the Belleville Senators. While in the AHL, Del Zotto set a Belleville-franchise record scoring 10 goals and 27 points in 26 games. He was recalled in March by Ottawa and finished the season with the team registering 26 games played and 13 points. On July 12, Del Zotto was placed on waivers again by the Senators for the purposes of buying out the final year of his contract, making him an unrestricted free agent.

On July 17, 2022, Del Zotto signed a contract with the Florida Panthers on a one-year, two-way contract. On December 19, 2022, Del Zotto was traded by the Panthers to the Detroit Red Wings in exchange for Givani Smith. He was subsequently traded by the Red Wings to the Ducks in exchange for Danny O'Regan. Prior to being traded, he recorded two goals and eight assists in 25 games for the Charlotte Checkers during the 2022−23 season. On September 6, 2023, Del Zotto announced his retirement from professional hockey.

== Personal life ==
Del Zotto attended St. Brother André Catholic High School in Markham, Ontario, and later attended St. Andrew's College in nearby Aurora. He wore number 4 in junior and in the NHL with the Rangers in homage to Boston Bruins great Bobby Orr.

Del Zotto has done charitable work, including Madison Square Garden's "Garden of Dreams" foundation, in which a segment of his work was featured in Lisa Varga's Beyond the Offseason.

In 2014, Del Zotto was derided by pornographic actress Lisa Ann on Twitter for harrying her regarding dating.

== Career statistics ==
=== Regular season and playoffs ===
			Regular season					Playoffs
Season	Team	League	GP	G	A	Pts	PIM	GP	G	A	Pts	PIM
2005–06	Markham Waxers AAA	ETA U16	73	30	90	120	90	—	—	—	—	—
2006−07	Oshawa Generals	OHL	64	10	47	57	78	9	3	9	12	14
2007−08	Oshawa Generals	OHL	64	16	47	63	82	15	2	6	8	38
2008−09	Oshawa Generals	OHL	34	7	26	33	48	—	—	—	—	—
2008−09	London Knights	OHL	28	6	24	30	30	14	3	16	19	18
2009−10	New York Rangers	NHL	80	9	28	37	32	—	—	—	—	—
2010−11	New York Rangers	NHL	47	2	9	11	20	—	—	—	—	—
2010−11	Connecticut Whale	AHL	11	0	7	7	8	—	—	—	—	—
2011−12	New York Rangers	NHL	77	10	31	41	36	20	2	8	10	12
2012−13	Rapperswil–Jona Lakers	NLA	9	2	5	7	10	—	—	—	—	—
2012−13	New York Rangers	NHL	46	3	18	21	18	12	1	1	2	8
2013−14	New York Rangers	NHL	42	2	9	11	10	—	—	—	—	—
2013−14	Nashville Predators	NHL	25	1	4	5	8	—	—	—	—	—
2014−15	Philadelphia Flyers	NHL	64	10	22	32	34	—	—	—	—	—
2015−16	Philadelphia Flyers	NHL	52	4	9	13	16	—	—	—	—	—
2016−17	Philadelphia Flyers	NHL	51	6	12	18	28	—	—	—	—	—
2017−18	Vancouver Canucks	NHL	82	6	16	22	48	—	—	—	—	—
2018−19	Vancouver Canucks	NHL	23	1	3	4	8	—	—	—	—	—
2018−19	Anaheim Ducks	NHL	12	0	3	3	0	—	—	—	—	—
2018−19	St. Louis Blues	NHL	7	0	3	3	0	—	—	—	—	—
2019−20	Anaheim Ducks	NHL	49	2	13	15	14	—	—	—	—	—
2020−21	Columbus Blue Jackets	NHL	53	4	9	13	8	—	—	—	—	—
2021−22	Ottawa Senators	NHL	26	3	10	13	4	—	—	—	—	—
2021−22	Belleville Senators	AHL	26	10	17	27	18	—	—	—	—	—
2022−23	Charlotte Checkers	AHL	25	2	8	10	14	—	—	—	—	—
2022–23	San Diego Gulls	AHL	40	6	25	31	51	—	—	—	—	—
NHL totals			736	63	199	262	284	32	3	9	12	20

=== International ===
Year	Team	Event	Result	GP	G	A	Pts	PIM
2007	Canada	IH18	4th	4	0	2	2	4
2010	Canada	WC	7th	5	0	0	0	0
Senior totals				5	0	0	0	0

== Awards and honors ==
Award	Year
OHL
First All-Rookie Team	2007
CHL/NHL Top Prospects Game	2008
Third All-Star Team	2009
NHL
All-Rookie Team	2010
Stanley Cup champion	2019

Awards and achievements
Preceded by Alexei Cherepanov	New York Rangers first-round draft pick 2008	Succeeded by Chris Kreider
