= Ken Khachigian =

American speechwriter (born 1944)

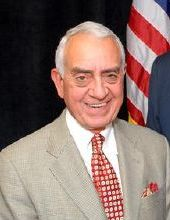

White House Chief Speechwriter
- In office January 20, 1981 – May 3, 1981
- President: Ronald Reagan
- Preceded by: Bernard W. Aronson (Director of Speechwriting)
- Succeeded by: Tony Dolan

Personal details
- Born: September 14, 1944 (age 82) Visalia, California, U.S.
- Party: Republican
- Education: University of California, Santa Barbara (BA); Columbia University (JD)

Kenneth L. Khachigian (born September 14, 1944) is an American political consultant, speechwriter, and attorney. He is best known for being a longtime aide to President Richard Nixon and chief speechwriter to President Ronald Reagan.

He served as chief speechwriter on Reagan's successful 1980 presidential campaign. He continued as chief speechwriter in the Reagan administration, writing Reagan's first inaugural address, his three main economic speeches, and the welcome home speech to the Iranian hostages. Although he resigned after several months to return to the private sector in California, he continued to write many of the major political and policy speeches as chief speechwriter on Reagan's successful 1984 re-election campaign and throughout the second term, including the 1984 nomination acceptance speech, the 1985 remarks at the former Bergen-Belsen concentration camp in Germany, and the 1988 Republican National Convention farewell address.

He is a veteran of nine presidential campaigns. Most recently, he served as a senior advisor to the presidential campaigns of Bob Dole (1996), John McCain (2000), and Fred Thompson (2008).

== Early life and education ==
Khachigian was born September 14, 1944, in Visalia, California. He was raised with his three brothers on a 60-acre (24 ha), cotton, walnut, and grape farm founded by his paternal grandfather, who had escaped from Armenia ahead of the Armenian genocide and immigrated to the United States in 1912.

He attended Mt. Whitney High School in Visalia, where he was elected sophomore, junior, and senior class president, and graduated in 1962.

He received his Bachelor of Arts in political science, with honors, from the University of California, Santa Barbara in 1966 and his Juris Doctor from Columbia Law School in 1969.

== Career ==
=== 1968 presidential campaign ===
Khachigian was in law school at Columbia University at the time that former Vice President Richard Nixon decided to seek the presidency. He wrote to the campaign, offering to volunteer and in December 1967, he was hired by Pat Buchanan to work in the New York campaign headquarters answering letters between classes at law school. He went on to handle small research projects, such as locating quotations and figures for Nixon speeches. By the summer of 1968, he had worked up to writing agriculture, housing, and transportation position papers as a research and policy aide reporting directly to Alan Greenspan, the campaign's economic and domestic policy advisor.

=== Nixon administration, first term (1970–72) ===
In January 1970, shortly after graduating from Columbia Law School, he joined the Nixon Administration as part of the national goals research staff. In August 1970, he became staff assistant to the director of communications, Herbert Klein. He became involved in the 1970 congressional midterm elections, writing speeches and preparing political analyses. In early 1971, he was responsible for generating support for specific administration proposals. In the spring of 1971, he was transferred along with most of Klein's staff to Charles Colson, the special counsel to the President, with his duties remaining unchanged.

=== 1972 presidential campaign ===
By May 1971, Khachigian was working on the 1972 Presidential re-election campaign. In a memorandum of May 27, 1971, Buchanan described to the chief of staff, H. R. Haldeman, the duties which he proposed to delegate to Khachigian: "to keep tabs on candidates, to keep the 'relevant' research on hand, to write materials needed to get into hands [sic] of various speakers, to communicate with party leaders and the like in states where opposition candidates appear." By late spring of 1972, he was regarded as the White House's major research source on the McGovern campaign.

=== Nixon administration, second term (1973–74) ===
In early 1973, Khachigian transferred to the President's speechwriting staff, working under chief speechwriter David Gergen, with the title of deputy special assistant to the President. At first, his subject areas of expertise were agriculture, natural resources and the environment, and political and legal affairs. Beginning in June 1973, however, he took on the tasks of researcher and writer on issues and problems evolving from the Watergate break-in.

=== Presidential memoirs and Frost/Nixon interviews ===
Khachigian worked for President Gerald Ford for two months, until the fall of 1974. He then moved to San Clemente, California to assist Nixon with his presidential memoirs.

In 1977, he served as chief researcher for Nixon's interviews with David Frost. He was portrayed by actor Gabriel Jarret in the 2008 historical drama film Frost/Nixon that tells the story behind the Frost/Nixon interviews.

Nixon's memoirs were completed in the spring of 1978, however, Khachigian continued to work for Nixon for an additional year, assisting with several post-publication activities, including organizing briefing books for Nixon's trips to Europe and outlining ideas for speeches. He would later attribute much of his expertise to the four years spent working closely with Nixon on his memoirs.

=== 1980 presidential campaign ===
Khachigian joined Ronald Reagan's 1980 presidential campaign, having been recruited by Reagan's campaign manager, Stu Spencer. Khachigian traveled on the campaign plane to punch up speeches between campaign stops. He helped coin the term "fatally flawed", which was used throughout the campaign, referencing the Strategic Arms Limitation Talks (SALT) II with the Soviet Union.

=== Reagan administration, first term (1981–84) ===
In 1981, Khachigian was named chief speechwriter and special consultant to the President. Within the first 100 days, Khachigian wrote Reagan's inaugural address, his three main economic speeches, and the welcome home to the Iranian hostages.

=== 1984 presidential campaign ===
During the 1984 presidential campaign, Khachigian served as chief campaign speechwriter, senior advisor, and director of issues and research. He wrote the 1984 nomination acceptance speech and was one of only two campaign aides who accompanied President Reagan aboard Air Force One throughout his landslide re-election. Khachigian also, along with Stuart Spencer, James A. Baker III, Richard Darman, David Stockman, and Michael Deaver, helped prepare Reagan for his presidential debates with Democrat Walter Mondale.

=== Reagan administration, second term (1985–88) ===
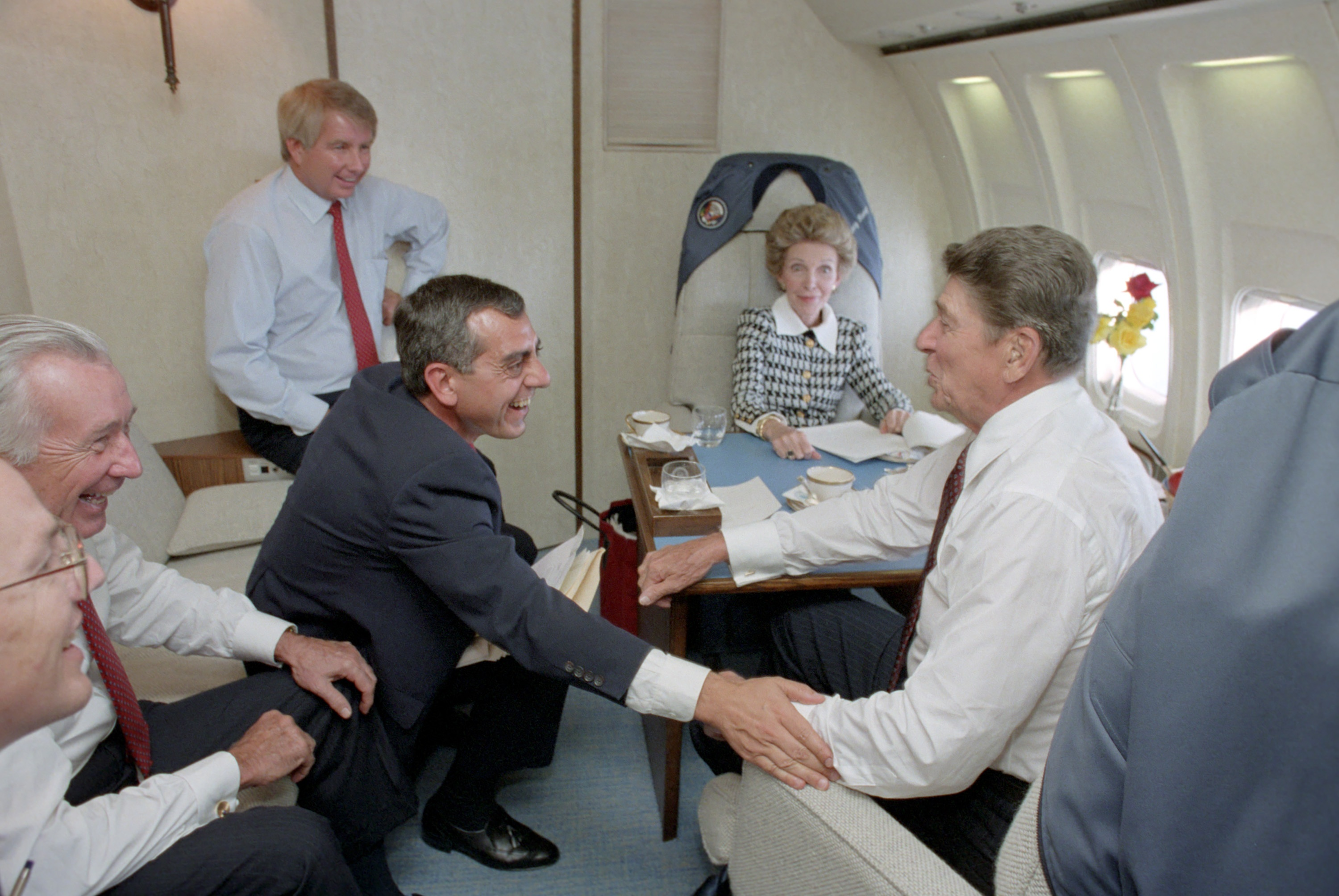
Khachigian with President Ronald Reagan, First Lady Nancy Reagan, press secretary Larry Speakes, chief of staff Don Regan, and aide Dennis Thomas aboard Air Force One circa 1986.

In May 1985, Reagan delivered a Khachigian-crafted speech at the former Bergen-Belsen concentration camp in Germany. In the previous month, the Administration had announced that Reagan would visit the Kolmeshohe Cemetery near Bitburg, at the suggestion of Chancellor Helmut Kohl of West Germany, to pay respects to the soldiers interred there. The visit was intended to be symbolic of the goodwill between the two countries, but unbeknownst to the Reagan Administration, 49 of the graves contained the remains of men who had served in the Waffen-SS. In an effort to placate the protesters, Reagan added a visit to the Bergen-Belsen concentration camp to his itinerary. Reagan famously said, "... we can and must pledge: Never again." TIME magazine praised the address as a "skillful exercise in both the art of eulogy and political damage control". Reagan biographer Edmund Morris regards this as the best speech of Reagan's career.

In August 1988, Khachigian drafted Reagan's farewell address to the Republican National Convention in New Orleans and then joined the Bush presidential campaign as an aide to vice presidential nominee Dan Quayle. He traveled with Quayle for 10 weeks through election day, preparing him for debates and writing campaign speeches.

=== California campaigns ===
Khachigian has been active in California elections since the early 1980s. He is regarded as the "lion" of California GOP politics. Nationally prominent political commentator Bob Novak wrote that Khachigian is "perhaps the state's premier Republican strategist and wordsmith."

During the 1982 and 1986 California gubernatorial campaigns, Khachigian was senior adviser and principal strategist for Governor George Deukmejian. He also served as campaign chairman, campaign manager, and senior consultant to Dan Lungren for his two victories as Attorney General and to U.S. Senate candidate Bruce Herschensohn — engineering come-from-behind wins for Lungren's first campaign and Herschensohn's primary victory in 1992. For Herschensohn's dramatic upset victory, The San Francisco Chronicle's leading political reporter, Jerry Roberts, described Khachigian as "the wily veteran GOP message-maker" and dubbed him "best manager" for his efforts.

Khachigian counseled Pete Wilson in his winning U.S. Senate and gubernatorial campaigns, and in 1998 guided the successful statewide retention election of California Supreme Court Justice Ming Chin.

=== Presidential campaigns ===
Khachigian has worked on nine presidential campaigns.

In addition to his work on the Nixon, Reagan, and Bush-Quayle campaigns, he served as a national senior adviser to presidential nominee Bob Dole in 1996. He ran Dole's California campaign and oversaw all scheduling and issue planning for the state.

During the 2000 election campaign, Khachigian was a senior adviser traveling with Senator John McCain to New Hampshire, South Carolina, and California during the primaries, as McCain sought the Republican Presidential nomination. Subsequently, he served as an adviser to the Bush-Cheney campaign nationally and in California.

More recently, Khachigian served as senior advisor to Fred Thompson's 2008 presidential campaign.

According to the Center for Public Integrity, the practice of opposition research became systematized in the 1970s, when Khachigian suggested that the GOP keep files on individuals as insurance against future races, rather than "scramble" in an ad hoc fashion, race by race.

=== Notable speeches ===
Khachigian wrote many of Reagan's most important speeches, including:

- President Reagan's First Inaugural Address
- Welcome home ceremony remarks for the hostages taken during the Iran hostage crisis
- Acceptance speech at the 1984 Republican National Convention
- 1985 remarks at the former Bergen-Belsen concentration camp in Germany
- Farewell address at the 1988 Republican National Convention

== Personal life ==
Khachigian is an attorney and writer in Orange County, California, and serves as director emeritus to the Richard Nixon Foundation, on the advisory board for the Armenian Eyecare Project, and has memberships in the Orange County Cardinals and Orange County Triple X Fraternity.

Previously, he served on the board of overseers for the Hoover Institution from 1986–1992 and as a board member of the Armenian Assembly of America from 1983–1989. From 1981-1982, he served as President Reagan's appointee to the National Institute of Justice advisory board.

In 1989, he received the Distinguished Alumni Award from the University of California, Santa Barbara, where he graduated With Honors as an Outstanding Graduating Senior and served as Student Body President.

He has been honored for public service by the 4-H Clubs of America, the Armenian Assembly of America, the Armenian Eyecare Project, The Armenian Educational Foundation, the Armenian National Committee, and the Armenian American Museum and Cultural Center.
