= Fair Haven (film) =

- Directed by: Kerstin Karlhuber
- Written by: Jack Bryant
- Story by: Jack Bryant; Kerstin Karlhuber
- Produced by: Tom Malloy
- Starring: Tom Wopat; Michael Grant; Gregory Harrison; Josh Green; Lily Anne Harrison
- Cinematography: Jason Beasley
- Edited by: Frank Reynolds
- Music by: Christopher Farrell
- Production companies: Silent Giant Productions; Trick Candle Productions
- Distributed by: Breaking Glass Pictures
- Release date: April 23, 2016
- Running time: 90 minutes
- Country: United States
- Language: English

Fair Haven is a 2016 American independent drama film directed by Kerstin Karlhuber, written by Jack Bryant, produced by Tom Malloy, and starring Tom Wopat, Michael Grant, Gregory Harrison, Josh Green, and Lily Anne Harrison.

The film was released by Breaking Glass Pictures digitally and theatrically and it premiered on Showtime Networks in June 2017.

== Premise ==
A young man returns to his family farm, after a long stay in conversion therapy, and is torn between the expectations of his emotionally distant father and the memories of a past, loving gay relationship he has tried to bury.

== Storyline ==
James Grant and his parents, Richard and his wife, own and farm the Fair Haven Orchard in a small town in Vermont. This orchard has been in their family for four generations. Richard Grant seeks to carry on the family legacy despite two bombshell events: 1) he and his wife discover that James has a gay relationship with his high school classmate, Charlie Green, and 2) his wife dies. Richard's wife provides the guiding center of their family life: James and Richard measure their own lives and actions in the light of what "Mom" would have wanted. This motivates the parents' sending of James into conversion therapy under the direction of Dr. Gallagher, a Christian therapist. James emerges from this therapy ostensibly "cured" of his homosexuality. He is led to believe that he is able to live out his life "normally" as his mother and father would desire. James assures his father that the therapy has helped him.

When James comes home from this therapy, he faces the hard reality that his father has seen fit to spend all of the money put by for him to attend Berklee College of Music in Boston, Massachusetts. This is devastating to James since his goal is to become a concert pianist. His father vetoes these plans, demanding that James attend technical college to study Agribusiness. His goal for James is for him to take over the family farm.

James helps his father on the farm, and his father gives him the responsibility of delivering cases of apples to surrounding stores and other clients. Unhappily for the "success" of James's conversion to heterosexuality, his delivery route brings him regularly back in contact with his "old flame," Charlie Green. For this reason, James suggests that his father do the deliveries himself, but his father expects James to continue doing them.

James sees the need for "moral support," so father and son go back to church. James is introduced to the pastor's daughter, Suzy, who was in the high school class behind James and Charlie. Suzy is eager to become James's girlfriend and go out with him, but James is shy and awkward around her.

The budding romance with Suzy comes to a grinding halt when James discovers that Charlie was cruelly gay bashed. James insists on driving Charlie home from work from then on.

James and Charlie get together for a picnic one Saturday evening, and they end up spending the night together in James's barn. Suzy discovers them together and cuts herself off from James. James's father, realizing what has happened, appears to disown James. James and Charlie plan to go away together to Boston where James can go to music school.

James's father goes through a period of taking stock of his own life and coming to a realization of what is best for his son and himself. The conversion of local orchards into producers of organic apples and the generous offer of a buyer help Richard make up his mind to sell the farm.

Richard tells his son, "The farm isn't family: we are." Richard can then provide for James all the money he needs to follow his dream of going to music school and living his life with his life partner, Charlie. Richard acknowledges that both he and James's mother are proud of him.

== Cast ==
- Michael Grant as James
- Tom Wopat as Richard
- Gregory Harrison as Dr. Gallagher
- Josh Green as Charlie
- Lily Anne Harrison (Gregory Harrison's daughter) as Suzy
- Tom Malloy as Reverend Thomas
- Jennifer Taylor as Ruby
- Lisa Varga as Patricia
- Denise Dorado as Helena
- Michael Cuddire as Sebastian
- Joanna Herrington as Melissa
- Susan Katz Aser as Mrs. Grant

== Production ==
Although the film takes place in Vermont, it was shot on location in and around Rochester, New York, in June 2014.

== Release ==
Fair Haven premiered domestically at the Human Rights Campaign headquarters in Washington, D.C. in April 2016 before completing an extensive international festival run. The film's international premiere was in Turin, Italy in May 2016. An American theatrical release followed in March 2017 in Los Angeles. The film premiered on Showtime Networks in June 2017 and was also released digitally and on DVD by Breaking Glass Pictures. The film's sales agent is The Little Film Company. It continues to release internationally in foreign territories.

== Reception ==
Fair Haven was called a "bold new film" by The Huffington Post and "stirring, well acted, and tenderly wrought" by the Los Angeles Times. The film was also named a "Don't Miss Indie" by Film Independent.
