= Bihlman =

Bihlman is a surname. Notable people with the surname include:

- George Bihlman (1895–1985), American athlete
- Jabo Bihlman (fl. from 1997), American guitarist, singer, songwriter and producer
