= Stuart Spencer =

Stuart Spencer may refer to:

- Stuart Spencer (footballer) (1932–2011), Australian rules footballer
- Stuart Spencer (political consultant) (1927–2025), American political consultant
