= Tom Malloy =

American actor

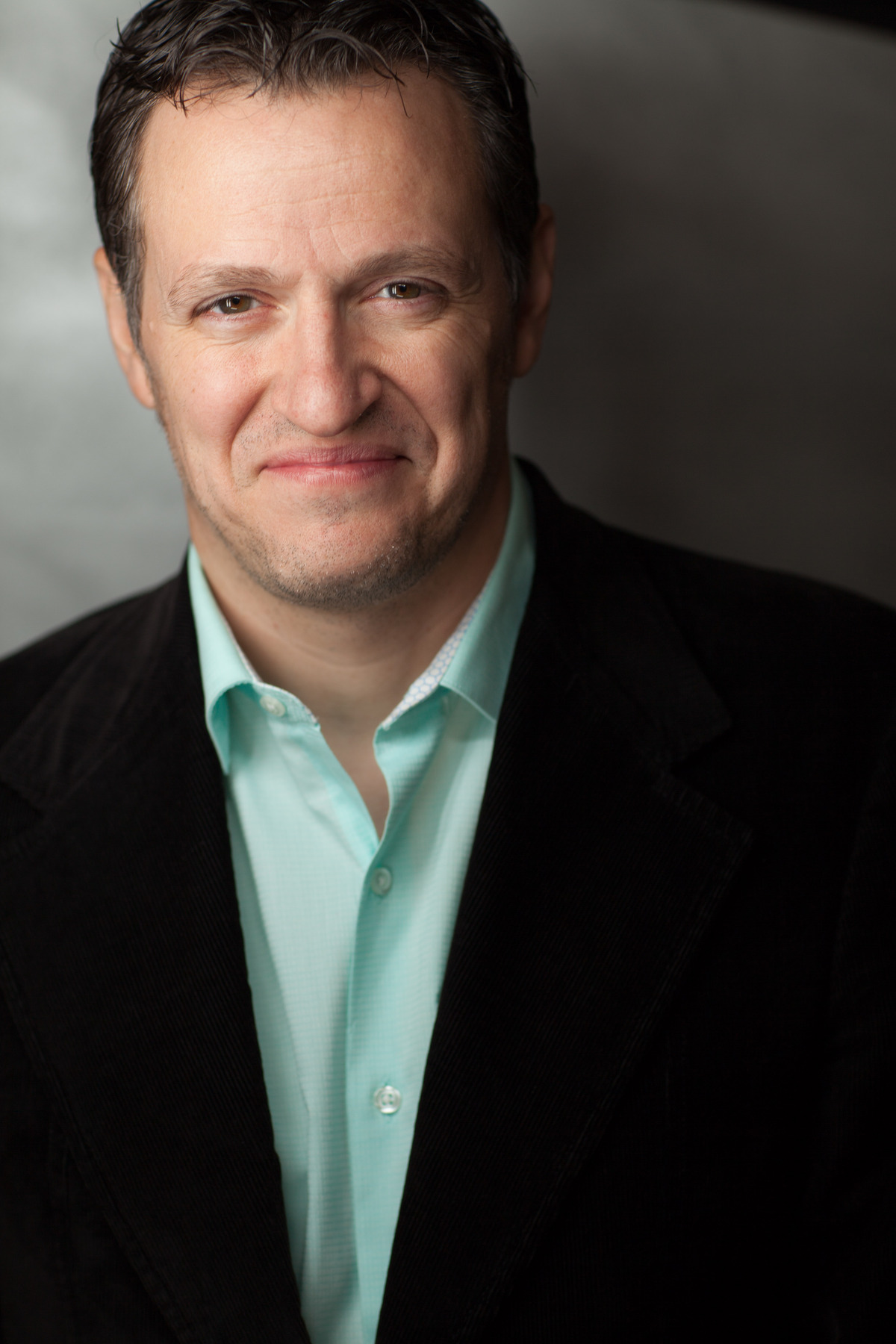
- Born: Thomas John Malloy; 1974 (age 51–52); Red Bank, New Jersey
- Occupations: Actor, producer, writer
- Years active: 1997–present

Thomas John Malloy is an American actor and filmmaker based in Los Angeles, California. He starred in Gravesend (1996), The Alphabet Killer (2008), Love N' Dancing (2009), and Ask Me to Dance (2022), and television shows, including Law & Order, Third Watch, and Kidnapped.

== Career ==
Malloy wrote, produced and acted in The Alphabet Killer, a psychological thriller directed by Rob Schmidt and starring Eliza Dushku, Cary Elwes, Timothy Hutton and Michael Ironside; and The Attic, a thriller directed by Mary Lambert and starring John Savage, Jason Lewis, and Elisabeth Moss. He has written, produced and starred in the 2009 film Love N' Dancing, a dance film/romantic comedy directed by Rob Iscove that stars Amy Smart, Billy Zane, Betty White and Rachel Dratch.

He wrote the book Bankroll: A New Approach To Financing Feature Films in 2009. A 2nd Edition of the book came out in 2012.

Malloy has produced several films over the years. In 2022, he produced Rear View Mirrors, starring Erika Christensen, Penelope Ann Miller, David James Elliot, and Zach Gilford. In 2021, he wrote, directed, produced, and starred in the film Ask Me to Dance, starring Briana Evigan and Mario Cantone. In 2020, he produced Lansky, Love N’ Dancing (directed by Rob Iscove), and the psychological thriller The Alphabet Killer (directed by Rob Schmidt).

=== Entrepreneurship ===
In 2019, Malloy co-founded FilmMakingStuffHQ, which has now become an online training and filmmaking platform for filmmakers.

== Personal life ==
Malloy was born in Red Bank, New Jersey and raised in the Whitehouse Station section of Readington Township, New Jersey. He is a graduate of Hunterdon Central Regional High School, where he acted in school performances with classmate Vera Farmiga, and of Montclair State University (1993–1997).

== Filmography ==
Year	Title	Cast as	Role	Ref.
1997	Gravesend	Chicken	Actor	
2008	The Alphabet Killer	Steven Harper	Actor, producer and writer	
2008	The Attic	Frankie Callan	Actor, producer and writer	
2009	Love N' Dancing	Jake Mitchell	Actor, producer and writer	
2013	Ashley (film)	Vincent	Actor	
2015	Hero of the Underworld	Dylan Berrick	Actor, producer and writer	
2016	Fair Haven	Reverend Thomas	Actor and producer	
2016	Shattered	Ken Burnett	Actor and producer	
2016	#Screamers	Tom Brennan	Actor, producer and writer	
2019	Trauma Therapy	Tobin Vance	Actor, producer and writer	
2022	Ask me to dance	Actor, producer and writer	Actor, producer and writer	
2023	Trauma Therapy: Psychosis	Tobin Vance	Actor, producer and writer	
