= Right to Die (Masters of Horror) =

- Masters of Horror episode
- Episode no.: Season 2 Episode 9
- Directed by: Rob Schmidt
- Written by: John Esposito
- Production code: 209
- Original air date: January 5, 2007

Guest appearances
- Martin Donovan; Julia Anderson; Robin Sydney; Anna Galvin; Linda Sorensen; Corbin Bernsen

Episode chronology
← Previous "Valerie on the Stairs"	Next → "We All Scream for Ice Cream"

"Right to Die" is the ninth episode of the second season from Masters of Horror directed by Rob Schmidt.

== Plot ==
Cliff Addison and his wife, Abby, have a road accident. He walks away unharmed, but she is left in a coma with her skin burned off. Cliff is told that there is a method of surgery that will allow her to live, but without speech or the ability to take care of herself. Cliff consults with his attorney, Ira, who persuades him to let his wife die. He reveals to Ira that he had an affair.

Cliff remembers an instance where his wife found his cell phone with a video of his mistress, Trish, stripping whilst moaning his name. Shortly after, Cliff hallucinates that he is taking a bath with his wife and they make love while her skin burns off. While he panics, it is shown that his wife had died but was resuscitated, and that he has a hand-shaped burn mark on his back. Cliff runs into Trish, and it is revealed that she had been fired by Abby, and only slept with Cliff out of pity. Cliff visits Abby and attempts to kiss her. Her eyes open and she begins to flatline. Cliff then learns that she had flatlined two nights ago, but was brought back.

Abby's ghost brutally kills Ira. Cliff returns home to see a drunken Trish and they have sex. In bed, Cliff tells Trish that in four hours, without the skin transplant, Abby will die, as will he. Cliff's phone rings, showing he is receiving seductive pictures of Trish, but sees Abby's skinless figure approaching from behind her. Trish screams, making Cliff rush to her and comfort her. He then breaks a bottle over her head. We next see a naked Trish strapped in the dentist chair, being prepped by Cliff to have her skin transferred to Abby. He informs her that he regrets that she has to be alive for the procedure, but the skin has to be fresh. In her heavily-drugged state, she does not feel pain as Cliff cuts off her skin before decapitating her.

Cliff thinks back to the drive before the accident. Abby revealed that she was pregnant. Cliff was apparently overjoyed, but Abby said that she was going to leave him because of the affair and never let him see the baby. Because of their argument, Cliff had taken his eyes off the road, which led to their crash. The beginning scene is replayed, but it is shown that Cliff made a conscious decision to not call 911. She apologized for being harsh to him, but he purposely set the car on fire. Almost immediately, he regretted his decision as she screamed in agony.

Back to the present, Cliff arrives at the hospital with the skin, but finds that Abby has already died. He throws away Trish's body pieces, then goes home and is greeted on the doorstep by Abby's spirit. He enters the house and the door closes behind him.
