= Real Genius =

1985 film by Martha Coolidge

- Theatrical release poster
- Directed by: Martha Coolidge
- Screenplay by: Neal Israel; Pat Proft; PJ Torokvei
- Story by: Neal Israel; Pat Proft
- Produced by: Brian Grazer
- Starring: Val Kilmer; Gabe Jarret; Michelle Meyrink; William Atherton
- Cinematography: Vilmos Zsigmond
- Edited by: Richard Chew
- Music by: Thomas Newman
- Production company: Delphi III Productions
- Distributed by: Tri-Star Pictures
- Release date: August 7, 1985
- Running time: 106 minutes
- Country: United States
- Language: English
- Budget: $8 million
- Box office: $13 million (North America)

Real Genius is a 1985 American teen comedy film directed by Martha Coolidge, written by Neal Israel, Pat Proft, and PJ Torokvei, and starring Val Kilmer and Gabriel Jarret. The film, set on the campus of Pacific Tech, a science and engineering university similar to Caltech, follows Chris Knight (Kilmer), a genius in his senior year, who is paired with a new student on campus, Mitch Taylor (Jarret), to work on a chemical laser, only to learn it will be used for dangerous purposes. The film received positive reviews from critics, and grossed $13 million at the North American box office.

== Plot ==
The CIA has covertly hired Professor Jerry Hathaway at Pacific Tech University to develop the power source for "Crossbow", a laser weapon precise enough to commit illegal political assassinations from outer space. Hathaway uses his position to recruit brilliant students to do the work for him, diverting the CIA's funding into building his new house.

Hathaway recruits high school student Mitch Taylor, a budding genius in laser physics. Mitch is roomed with Chris Knight, a legend in the "National Physics Club" and one of Mitch's idols. Mitch's ideal of Chris is shattered, however, when Chris turns out to be more of a slacker than a hard-working student. Meanwhile, Hathaway hopes Mitch will encourage Chris to straighten up his act and that their two exceptional minds can develop a proper power source for Crossbow. Mitch also befriends Jordan Cochran, a hyperactive insomniac student for whom he gradually develops romantic feelings.

Kent, Hathaway's graduate student (and toady), reports Mitch for attending a pool party with Chris instead of working on the laser. Hathaway lambasts Mitch, who breaks down and tearfully calls his parents. Kent secretly records the call and uses the recording to humiliate Mitch. As Mitch begins packing to leave, Chris explains the pressures of school and burdens of being highly intelligent by relating the history of genius and former Pacific Tech student Lazlo Hollyfeld. Hollyfeld suffered a nervous breakdown when he discovered his creations were being used to kill, and he now lives hidden in the university's tunnels, accessed from beneath Chris and Mitch's closet. Chris, fearing the same could happen to him, learned to lighten up and enjoy life. Mitch agrees to stay, and they exact revenge on Kent by disassembling his car, a 1972 Citroën DS, and reassembling it in his dorm room.

Hathaway, angry about the still-incomplete project and Chris's attitude, informs Chris that he intends to prevent him from earning a degree, blackball him, and give a coveted job, originally promised to Chris, to Kent instead. Chris is disheartened and Mitch must use Chris's same argument to convince him to stay. The two create a new laser, but Kent sabotages it, causing it to explode. Though initially despondent, the incident inspires Chris to design and build a six-megawatt excimer laser, which burns a hole through the campus when it is test-fired. Hathaway reverses his position, giving Chris a degree and the job. As Chris and Mitch celebrate, Hollyfeld arrives and informs them that, with certain modifications, their laser could be used as a weapon. A panicked Chris returns to the lab to find the laser gone, as well as Kent's projects: a mirror and a tracking system which together can weaponize Chris's laser.

Jordan and fellow project member "Ick" Ikagami surreptitiously implant a radio transmitter in Kent's braces, which Mitch uses to convince him he is speaking to Jesus. Kent divulges the date of the test, and the group tails Hathaway to learn the location of the Air Force base the CIA is using. Chris and Mitch sneak onto the B-1 Lancer bomber where their equipment has been installed and assist Hollyfeld in reprogramming the laser.

Outside Hathaway's home, Chris, Mitch, Jordan, and Ick meet Dean Meredith and a Congressman, to whom they had reported Hathaway's plan. Kent arrives and goes inside the house. The laser test begins and, instead of firing on the target, fires on Hathaway's house, activating a gigantic popcorn popper. Kent is launched out the front door on a popcorn wave. Hollyfeld arrives in an RV—which he has won in a sweepstakes by submitting over a million entries—to tell them he is leaving. Hathaway, who hates popcorn, arrives afterwards to find his house destroyed by popcorn.

== Cast ==
- Val Kilmer as Chris Knight
- Gabriel Jarret as Mitch Taylor
- Michelle Meyrink as Jordan Cochran
- William Atherton as Professor Jerry Hathaway
- Robert Prescott as Kent
- Jon Gries as Lazlo Hollyfeld
- Mark Kamiyama as "Ick" Ikagami
- Ed Lauter as David Decker
- Louis Giambalvo as Major Don Carnagle
- Patti D'Arbanville as Sherry Nugil
- Severn Darden as Dr. Meredith
- Beau Billingslea as George
- Joanne Baron as Mrs. Taylor
- Sandy Martin as Mrs. Meredith
- Dean Devlin as Milton
- Yuji Okumoto as Fenton
- Deborah Foreman as Susan Decker
- Stacy Peralta as Shuttle Pilot
- Isabel Cooley as TV Stage Manager

== Production ==
To prepare for Real Genius, Martha Coolidge spent months researching laser technology and the policies of the CIA, and interviewed dozens of students at Caltech. The screenplay was extensively rewritten, first by Lowell Ganz and Babaloo Mandel, later by Coolidge and PJ Torokvei.

Producer Brian Grazer remembers that when Val Kilmer came in to audition for the role of Chris Knight, he brought candy bars and performed tricks. Kilmer remembered it differently. "The character wasn't polite, so when I shook Grazer's hand and he said, 'Hi, I'm the producer,' I said, 'I'm sorry. You look like you're 12 years old. I like to work with men.'"

To achieve the house filled with popcorn for the film's climax, the production team popped popcorn continuously for three months. The popcorn was treated with fire retardant so it would not combust and covered so that it would not be eaten by birds and possibly poison them. The popcorn was then shipped to a subdivision under construction in Canyon Country, northwest of Los Angeles, and placed in the house.

To promote the film, the studio held what it billed as "the world's first computer press conference", with Coolidge and Grazer answering journalists' questions via computer terminals and relayed over the CompuServe online service.

The dorm in the film is based on Dabney House at Caltech, and Caltech students served as consultants and played extras in the film.

== Reception ==
=== Box office ===
Real Genius was released on August 9, 1985, in 990 theaters, grossing $2.5 million in its first weekend. It went on to make $12,952,019 in North America.

=== Critical response ===
On review aggregator Rotten Tomatoes, the film holds an approval rating of 77% based on 35 reviews with an average rating of 6.7/10. The website's critical consensus reads, "It follows college tropes, but Real Genius has an optimistic streak that puts you on Val Kilmer's side all the way." On Metacritic, the film received a score of 71 based on 15 reviews, indicating "generally favorable reviews".

Colin Greenland reviewed the film for White Dwarf #85, and stated that it was "yet another celebration of the anxious wonder of growing up white, middle-class and heterosexual in America. The lovable weirdos squabble in the lab, play hi-tech pranks in the dorm and party in the lecture theater. Nerds just wanna have fun. Nerds have feelings too. Hug a Nerd today."

In her review for The New York Times, Janet Maslin wrote, "the film is best when it takes [the students] seriously, though it does so only intermittently." David Ansen wrote in his review for Newsweek, "When it's good, the dormitory high jinks feel like the genuine release of teen-age tensions and cruelty. Too bad the story isn't as smart as the kids in it." In her review for The Washington Post, Rita Kempley wrote, "Many of the scenes, already badly written, fail to fulfill their screwball potential... [D]espite its enthusiastic young cast and its many good intentions, it doesn't quite succeed. I guess there's a leak in the think tank."

Chicago Sun Times film critic Roger Ebert awarded the film three and a half stars out of four, saying that it "contains many pleasures, but one of the best is its conviction that the American campus contains life as we know it." In his review for The Globe and Mail, Salem Alaton wrote, "Producer Brian Grazer craved a feel-good picture, and she [Martha Coolidge] turned in the summer's best, and she didn't cheat to do it. There's heart in the kookiness. Real Genius has real people, real comedy and real fun." Richard Schickel of Time praised the film for being "a smart, no-nonsense movie that may actually teach its prime audience a valuable lesson: the best retort to an intolerable situation is not necessarily a food fight. Better results, and more fun, come from rubbing a few brains briskly together."

== Scientific accuracy ==
In the MythBusters episode "Car vs. Rain", first broadcast on June 17, 2009, the MythBusters team tried to determine whether the final scene in the film, the destruction of Dr Hathaway's house with laser-popped popcorn, is actually possible. First they used a ten-watt laser to pop a single kernel wrapped in aluminum foil, showing that popping corn is possible with a laser. Then they tested a scaled-down model of a house. The popcorn was popped through induction heating because a sufficiently large laser was not available. The result was that the popcorn was unable to expand sufficiently to break glass, much less break open a door or move the house off its foundation. Instead, it ceased to expand and then simply charred.

It was also specifically stated in the program that a five-megawatt laser still did not exist, even in military applications, and that the most powerful military laser they knew of was 100 kilowatts.

In January 2011, it was further demonstrated on video in a home setting that a kernel of corn directly exposed to laser light from accessible consumer level lasers could be popped as reported by TechCrunch.

The solid xenon-halogen laser proposed and built by Chris in the latter half of the film, though in the realm of science fiction, was based on a theory of the time. Real Genius, through consultant Martin A. Gundersen, who played the math professor, was later cited in an academic publication that detailed the scientific basis behind the laser.

== Television series ==
Reports surfaced in September 2014 that a potential television series was in the works. NBC was set to produce the comedy series with Sony TV, Happy Madison and 3 Arts Entertainment. As of December 2017 there were no updates on the production.
