= Defense wound =

Type of injury

- Other names: Self-defense wound
- Specialty: Forensic pathology
- Symptoms: Injuries to hands, forearms, feet, or legs incurred while resisting an attack
- Complications: Lacerations; abrasions; contusions; fractures; gunshot wounds; partial finger amputation
- Causes: Attempting to block, fend off, or grasp a weapon during an assault
- Diagnostic method: Forensic examination
- Differential diagnosis: Accidental injuries; offensive wounds

A defense wound or self-defense wound is an injury received by the victim of an attack while trying to defend against the assailant(s). Defensive wounds are often found on the hands and forearms if a victim raised them to protect the head and face or to fend off an assault, but may also be present on the feet and legs if a victim who was lying down attempted to defend themselves by kicking at their assailant.

The appearance and nature of the wound varies with the type of weapon used and the location of the injury, and may present as a laceration, abrasion, contusion or bone fracture. Where a victim has time to raise hands or arms before being shot by an assailant, the injury may also present as a gunshot wound. Severe laceration of the palmar surface of the hand or partial amputation of fingers may result from the victim grasping the blade of a weapon during an attack. In forensic pathology the presence of defense wounds is highly indicative of homicide and also proves that the victim was, at least initially, conscious and able to offer some resistance during the attack.

Defense wounds may be classified as active or passive. A victim of a knife attack, for example, would receive active defense wounds from grasping at the knife's blade, and passive defense wounds on the back of the hand if it was raised up to protect the face.

Protective injuries to the palms and forearms suggest the victim raised their hands against a bladed weapon rather than being incapacitated at the outset.
