= The Attic (2007 film) =

- Directed by: Mary Lambert
- Screenplay by: Tom Malloy; Bob Reitano
- Story by: Tom Malloy
- Produced by: Tom Malloy; Isen Robbins; Aimee Schoof; Russ Terlecki
- Starring: Elisabeth Moss; Jason Lewis; Tom Malloy
- Cinematography: James Callanan
- Edited by: Jack Haigis
- Music by: Mario Grigorov
- Release dates: November 2, 2007 (Germany); January 15, 2008 (United States)
- Running time: 85 minutes
- Country: United States
- Language: English

The Attic is a 2007 American horror film directed by Mary Lambert and starring Elisabeth Moss, Jason Lewis, Tom Malloy, and Catherine Mary Stewart.

== Plot ==
Emma has a strong aversion towards her family's new house, especially the attic. After moving in, she becomes miserable and reclusive. The rest of her family also seems unhappy and unsettled. The situation escalates one day when Emma is in the attic alone. All of a sudden someone who looks exactly like Emma attacks her viciously.

Emma is convinced that someone or something is haunting her, and she refuses to leave her house until she can piece the puzzle together, with the assistance of John Trevor, a sympathetic detective. Eventually, Emma suspects her parents of hiding skeletons in the closet from the family's past and practicing magical rituals using Wicca symbols seemingly stolen from satanism. As the clues pile up, she discovers that she once had a sister named Beth, who died twelve days after Emma was born. Emma realizes that this identical apparition may actually be Beth returning to life.

Emma witnesses Beth kill her brother, and the police suspect it was really Emma. John Trevor comes to the rescue when Beth is trying to strangle Emma to death, and leaves Emma with a gun. She suspects that her father was to blame and murders both her parents. When the police arrive, Emma threatens "John Trevor", who now claims to be a paramedic, with the gun he gave her. As she points the gun at Trevor, she is really pointing the gun at herself, and when she pulls the trigger, she kills herself.

The police later discuss the incident, and Emma's former psychologist explains that Beth and Trevor were only in her mind. Another officer mentions that the previous owner of the house, Ava Strauss, mysteriously died. The psychologist says that houses do not kill people, but in this case it did. The film ends as a new family looks to buy the house. As a young girl about Emma's age explores the attic, "John Trevor", now a real estate agent called Ron, appears behind her and says they will be seeing a lot of each other.

== Cast ==
- Elisabeth Moss as Emma Callen
- Jason Lewis as John Trevor
- Tom Malloy as Frankie Callan
- John Savage as Graham Callan
- Catherine Mary Stewart as Kim Callan
- Thomas Jay Ryan as Dr. Perry
- Alexandra Daddario as Ava Strauss
- Gil Deeble as Detective Carter
- Clark Middleton as Dr. Cofi
- Lynn Marie Stetson as Beth
- Tara Thompson as Allison
- Nick Gregory as Detective
- Sara Maraffino as Demon (voice)
- Russell Terlecki as paramedic
- Betsy Aidem as Ms. Kettering

== Release ==
The film was released on DVD in Germany in 2007. Allumination FilmWorks released it on DVD in the US on January 15, 2008.

== Reception ==
Joshua Siebalt of Dread Central awarded it one out of a possible five stars and wrote, "The Attic is not the Mary Lambert comeback fans, myself included, were likely hoping for. Instead it’s just another predictable psychological horror movie posing as a ghost story and very much not worth your time." Justin Felix of DVD Talk rated it 1.5 out of 5 stars and wrote, "The Attic is fairly transparent and you'll figure out the answers long before the heroine does." Jim Thomas of DVD Verdict wrote, "This is a bad movie. Avoid it at all costs."
