= Grinder Blues =

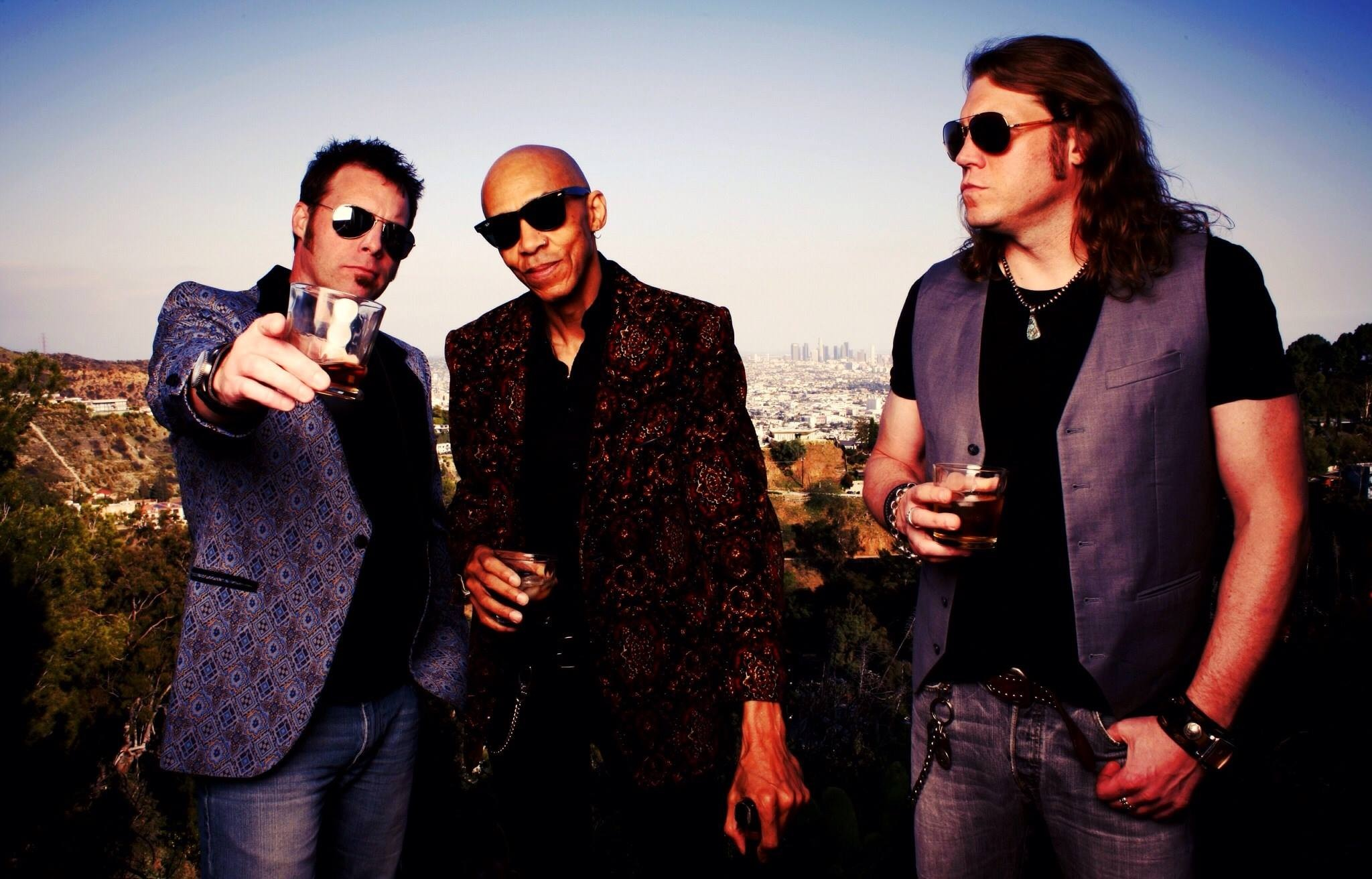
- Grinder Blues

Background information
- Genres: Hard rock, blues
- Years active: 2014–present
- Label: Megaforce Records
- Members: Doug Pinnick; Jabo Bihlman; Scot "Little" Bihlman
- Website: www.grinderblues.com

Grinder Blues is a hard rock blues trio that features Doug Pinnick of King's X, guitarist and vocalist Jabo Bihlman and Scot "Little" Bihlman on drums, percussion and vocals.

== History ==
The trio's debut self-titled album was released through Megaforce Records on October 14, 2014, and was described as "a shot of adrenaline to the heart of the genre". The album was produced by Miles Fulwider and Barry Mork and written collaboratively by the band. According to Guitar World magazine, Pinnick aimed to keep the music "simple and fun" while exploring new directions. The lyrics are traditional, an homage to their blues heroes.

The band premiered the video for "Burn the Bridge" on Revolver.com on September 15, 2014.

Grinder Blues supported the album with a West Coast tour that began October 16, 2014 at the Viper Room in Los Angeles and visited San Diego and Corona.

The Grinder Blues album debuted at #8 on The Billboard Charts the week of October 27, 2014 and was described by Vintage Guitar magazine as "A highly enjoyable blues-rock record with a plethora of grooves, down-and-dirty feel, filthy guitar, and soul-stirring vocals."

In September 2017, the trio launched a European tour.

Grinder Blues second record entitled El Dos was released via Metalville Records on September 24, 2021 and debuted at number 14 on the Billboard Blues Charts, it was mentioned as one of the top 20 blues rock records of 2021 by Denim and Leather Magazine.

== Discography ==
Studio albums

- Grinder Blues (2014)
- El Dos (2021)
