= Gabriel Jarret =

American actor

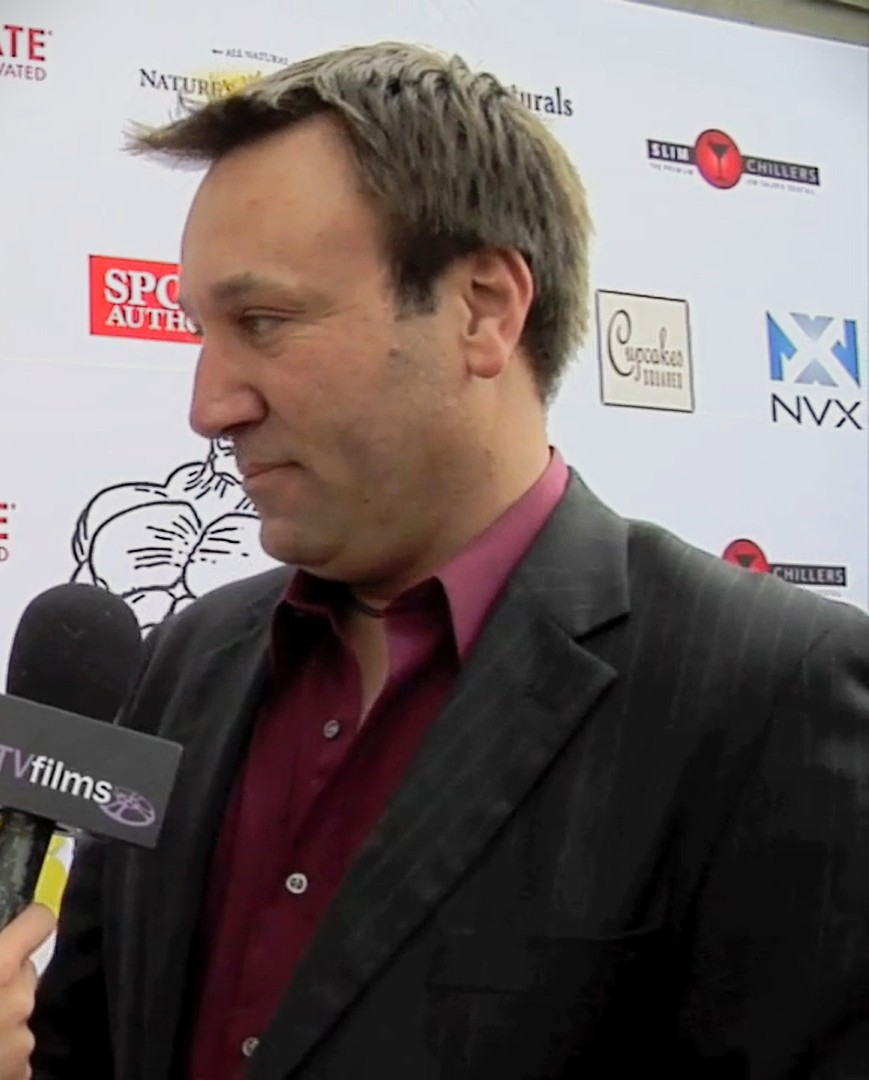
- Jarret in 2013
- Born: Gabriel Kronsberg; January 1, 1970; Los Angeles, California, U.S.
- Occupations: Actor, musician, American Sign Language interpreter
- Years active: 1981–present

Gabriel Jarret (né Kronsberg) is an American actor and musician. He began his career in 1981. He is best known for his role as the young genius Mitch Taylor in the 1985 comedy film Real Genius, in which he co-starred with Val Kilmer.

== Career ==
Gabriel Jarret's first film was Going Ape! in 1981. His most notable appearance was as Mitch Taylor alongside Val Kilmer's Chris Knight in the movie Real Genius. Other film roles include The Karate Kid Part III, Apollo 13 and Last Days. Jarret also made television guest appearances on 21 Jump Street, L.A. Law, Party of Five, and The West Wing. Jarret appeared as 1st Officer Chapman in Poseidon. He performed in Frost/Nixon as Richard Nixon (Frank Langella)'s speechwriter Ken Khachigian.

Jarret is also an American Sign Language (ASL) interpreter who performed with Terrylene in Sweet Nothing in My Ear with the Mixed Blood Theatre Company.

Jarret is a lyricist and vocalist of the rock/alternative rock vein. In the early 1990s, Jarret fronted the Los Angeles-based rock band The Unknown. The band had limited success for a short period, once appearing at the House of Blues with Tower of Power. The band attracted some record label interest but broke up before any deals materialized.

== Filmography ==
=== Film ===
| Year | Title | Role | Notes |
|---|---|---|---|
| 1981 | Going Ape! | Boy at Funeral | |
| 1985 | Real Genius | Mitch Taylor | |
| 1989 | The Karate Kid Part III | Rudy | |
| 1995 | Apollo 13 | GNC White | |
| 1995 | The American President | Jeff | |
| 1999 | Far from Bismarck | Ted / Todd | |
| 2001 | Last Days | Travis Hill | |
| 2003 | Spin, Shoot & Run | The Clown | |
| 2005 | Rumor Has It | Conference Attendee | |
| 2006 | Poseidon | 1st Officer Chapman | |
| 2008 | Frost/Nixon | Ken Khachigian | |
| 2009 | Endless Bummer | Gabe | |
| 2010 | The Grind | Marcoux | |
| 2010 | iCrime | Christoff | |
| 2013 | Pawn | SWAT Team Captain | |
| 2014 | Reaper | Joe | |
| 2015 | Going Bongo | Brian Kaufman | |
| 2016 | Hero of the Underworld | Rico | |
| 2017 | Swing State | Parking Enforcer | |
| 2019 | Limbo | John | |
| 2021 | 13 Minutes | Greg | |
| 2022 | Ask Me to Dance | Father Mitchell | |
| TBA | Gym Rat | Doctor | |
| TBA | Tales from the Dead Zone | Gabriel | |

=== Television ===
| Year | Title | Role | Notes |
|---|---|---|---|
| 1988 | 21 Jump Street | Ricky | Episode: "Champagne High" |
| 1988 | The Bronx Zoo | Aaron Issacson | Episode: "When I Paint My Masterpiece" |
| 1989 | Freddy's Nightmares | John Powers | Episode: "Identity Crisis" |
| 1993 | At Home with the Webbers | Thomas | Television film |
| 1993 | L.A. Law | Jeremy | Episode: "The Green, Green Grass of Home" |
| 1999 | Party of Five | Anders | Episode: "Naked" |
| 1999 | City Guys | Producer | Episode: "Movin' on Up" |
| 2002 | First Monday | Willis' Attorney | Episode: "Strip Search" |
| 2003 | The West Wing | Jason | Episode: "Guns Not Butter" |
| 2007 | The Game | Music Video Director | Episode: "Out of Bounds" |
| 2010 | The Fuzz | Detective Taylor | Television film |
| 2012 | Red Clover | Harris | Television film |
| 2022 | Bring on the Dancing Horses | Heckle | Episode: "#1.1" |
