= Cameron Gaunce =

Canadian ice hockey player (born 1990)

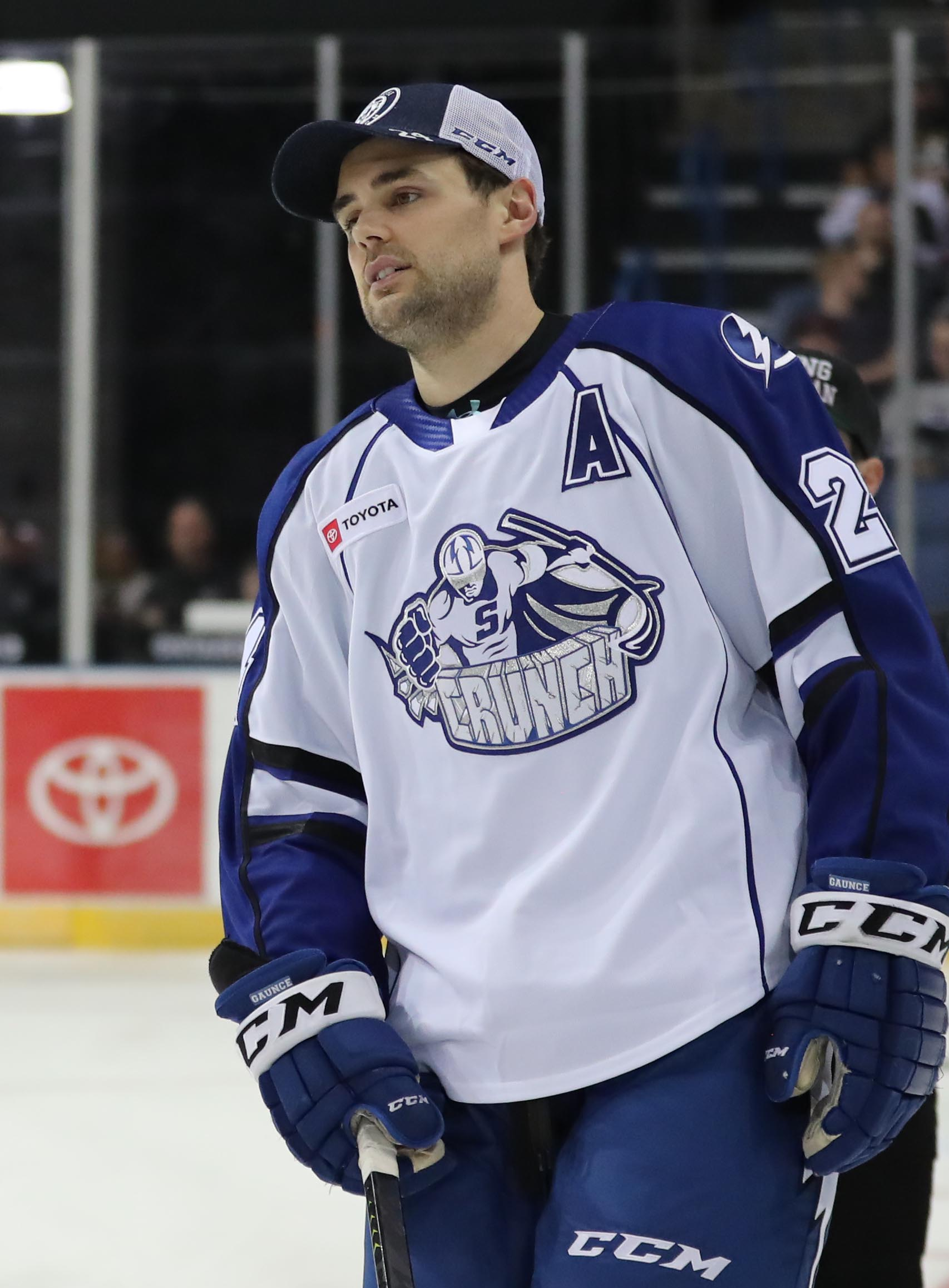
- Gaunce with the Syracuse Crunch in 2020
- Born: March 19, 1990 (age 36) Sudbury, Ontario, Canada
- Height: 6 ft 1 in (185 cm)
- Weight: 203 lb (92 kg; 14 st 7 lb)
- Position: Defence
- Shot: Left
- Played for: Colorado Avalanche; Dallas Stars; Pittsburgh Penguins; Tampa Bay Lightning; Fehérvár AV19
- NHL draft: 50th overall, 2008; Colorado Avalanche
- Playing career: 2010–2025

Cameron Gaunce (born March 19, 1990) is a Canadian former professional ice hockey defenceman. Gaunce was selected by Colorado Avalanche in the second round, 50th overall, of the 2008 NHL entry draft.

== Playing career ==
Gaunce grew up in Markham, Ontario, playing minor ice hockey with the Ontario Minor Hockey Association (OMHA) Markham Waxers, where he was a teammate of Steven Stamkos, Michael Del Zotto and Cody Hodgson. He played in the 2003 Quebec International Pee-Wee Hockey Tournament with Markham. He was selected 50th overall by the Colorado Avalanche in the 2008 NHL entry draft. Gaunce played with the Mississauga St. Michael's Majors of the Ontario Hockey League (OHL) for three seasons, and on May 11, 2009, he signed a three-year, entry-level contract with the Avalanche and attended the 2009 Avalanche's training camp before returning for his final year with the Majors in the 2009–10 season.

In his first professional season, in 2010–11, Gaunce was assigned to Colorado's American Hockey League (AHL) affiliate, the Lake Erie Monsters. After 54 games with the Monsters, he was called up to the NHL and made his NHL debut in Colorado's 5–3 defeat against the Nashville Predators on February 12, 2011. In his third game with the Avalanche, he scored his first NHL goal and point against Marc-André Fleury and the Pittsburgh Penguins in a 3–2 loss on February 16.

During the 2012–13 season, while playing with the Monsters and in the final year of his entry-level contract, on April 2, 2013, Gaunce was traded to the Dallas Stars in exchange for Tomáš Vincour. On December 17, 2013, Gaunce was called up to the Stars.

In September 2014, after failing to make the Stars' NHL roster out of training camp, Gaunce was assigned to Dallas' AHL affiliate, the Texas Stars.

On July 1, 2015, after he was not tendered a qualifying offer to remain with the Stars, Gaunce signed as a free agent to a one-year, two-way contract with the Florida Panthers. Gaunce was assigned to add leadership to Florida's AHL affiliate, the Portland Pirates, for the duration of the 2015–16 season. He responded by setting career-high numbers offensively with 37 points in 75 games.

On July 1, 2016, as a free agent, Gaunce signed a one-year, two-way contract with the Pittsburgh Penguins. In the 2016–17 season, he began playing in the AHL with the Wilkes-Barre/Scranton Penguins. With Pittsburgh suffering a depleted blueline through injury, Gaunce was recalled and eclipsed his previous efforts in the NHL to record a career-high 1 goal and 4 points in 12 games.

On July 1, 2017, as a free agent for the third straight year, Gaunce signed a two-year, two-way contract with the Columbus Blue Jackets. In the 2017–18 season, after attending the Blue Jackets' training camp, Gaunce was reassigned to Columbus' AHL affiliate, the Cleveland Monsters. In making his return to his first professional club in the Monsters, Gaunce added a veteran presence on the blueline and led the defence in scoring with 21 assists and 24 points.

On July 1, 2018, Gaunce signed a one-year, two-way contract with the Tampa Bay Lightning.

Following two productive seasons within the Lightning organizations, Gaunce left as a free agent leading into the pandemic delayed 2020–21 season. Unable to secure an NHL deal, Gaunce agreed to a one-year AHL contract with the Ontario Reign, affiliate to the Los Angeles Kings, on January 28, 2021. In the shortened AHL season, Gaunce contributed with 3 goals and 13 points in 24 games. In his second season with the Reign in the 2021–22 season, Gaunce featured regularly in 61 regular season games, collecting 7 goals and 27 points. He played in all five playoff games with the Reign in their divisional semi-final defeat to the Colorado Eagles.

On July 27, 2022, Gaunce opted to return for a third season with the Reign, re-signing to a one-year contract.

Following his fourteenth North American professional season, Gaunce as a free agent opted extend his career by pursuing a career abroad in signing a one-year contract with Hungarian club, Fehérvár AV19 of the ICEHL, on August 26, 2024.

== Personal ==
Gaunce's younger brother Brendan plays as a left winger in the Columbus Blue Jackets organization. Brendan, who was selected second overall by the Belleville Bulls in the 2010 OHL Priority Selection, was selected in the first round, 26th overall, by the Canucks in the 2012 NHL entry draft.

== Career statistics ==
			Regular season					Playoffs
Season	Team	League	GP	G	A	Pts	PIM	GP	G	A	Pts	PIM
2005–06	Markham Waxers	OMHA	72	11	60	71	122	—	—	—	—	—
2006–07	Markham Waxers	OPJHL	45	2	12	14	68	—	—	—	—	—
2007–08	Mississauga St. Michael's Majors	OHL	63	10	30	40	99	4	0	1	1	6
2008–09	Mississauga St. Michael's Majors	OHL	67	17	47	64	110	11	4	6	10	20
2009–10	Mississauga St. Michael's Majors	OHL	55	6	31	37	112	16	0	13	13	34
2010–11	Lake Erie Monsters	AHL	61	2	20	22	84	—	—	—	—	—
2010–11	Colorado Avalanche	NHL	11	1	0	1	16	—	—	—	—	—
2011–12	Lake Erie Monsters	AHL	75	6	21	27	90	—	—	—	—	—
2012–13	Lake Erie Monsters	AHL	61	1	10	11	98	—	—	—	—	—
2012–13	Texas Stars	AHL	9	1	4	5	0	9	0	0	0	0
2013–14	Texas Stars	AHL	65	3	15	18	73	18	0	4	4	12
2013–14	Dallas Stars	NHL	9	0	0	0	7	—	—	—	—	—
2014–15	Texas Stars	AHL	73	4	10	14	113	3	0	0	0	0
2015–16	Portland Pirates	AHL	75	2	35	37	60	5	0	0	0	4
2016–17	Wilkes-Barre/Scranton Penguins	AHL	49	2	11	13	38	4	0	1	1	0
2016–17	Pittsburgh Penguins	NHL	12	1	3	4	13	—	—	—	—	—
2017–18	Cleveland Monsters	AHL	67	3	21	24	96	—	—	—	—	—
2018–19	Syracuse Crunch	AHL	59	10	36	46	65	4	0	2	2	2
2018–19	Tampa Bay Lightning	NHL	2	0	0	0	7	—	—	—	—	—
2019–20	Syracuse Crunch	AHL	52	4	28	32	38	—	—	—	—	—
2019–20	Tampa Bay Lightning	NHL	3	1	3	4	4	—	—	—	—	—
2020–21	Ontario Reign	AHL	24	3	10	13	10	—	—	—	—	—
2021–22	Ontario Reign	AHL	61	7	20	27	63	5	0	0	0	14
2022–23	Ontario Reign	AHL	52	2	7	9	56	2	0	0	0	2
2023–24	Toronto Marlies	AHL	40	1	7	8	44	1	0	1	1	0
2024–25	Fehérvár AV19	ICEHL	44	6	19	25	60	7	0	3	3	4
NHL totals			37	3	6	9	47	—	—	—	—	—

== Awards and honours ==
Award	Year
AHL
Calder Cup (Texas Stars)	2014
AHL All-Star Game	2016, 2020
