= Jabo Bihlman =

American singer

- Genres: Rock, Blues, Americana, Film Score
- Occupation(s): Guitarist, singer, songwriter
- Instrument(s): Guitar, vocals, slide guitar, bass
- Labels: Warner Music Group, Megaforce Records, Metalville Records, Steelhead Records, Pinrut Records

Jeffrey Paul Bihlman, aka Jabo (Jay-bo), is an American guitarist, singer, songwriter and producer. He is the lead guitarist of the Grinder Blues band. Bihlman received an Emmy Award along with his band, The Bihlman Bros.

== Early life and education ==
Bihlman was born in Hammond, Indiana. He is a graduate in Psychology from Manchester University, he is a graduate as well from Musicians Institute (GIT).

== Career ==
In 1997, Bihlman formed the rock band The Bihlman Bros. along with his brother Scot Bihlman, where he performed as the lead singer and guitarist until the split of the band in 2018. The band has toured the US and Europe, and performed at The Tweeter Center, the Van Andel Arena, Interlochen Center for the Arts, and the White House. In 2009, the band wrote and performed songs for the film Love N' Dancing.

In the late 1990s, he was the bandleader for Son Seals. Bihlman worked with Son Seals on the album Lettin' Go, which won the W.C. Handy Award.

In 2014, Bihlman formed the Grinder Blues band with his brother Scot and King's X frontman Doug Pinnick, he is currently the lead guitarist for the band. The band has released two studio albums, Grinder Blues (2014) and El Dos (2021).

Bihlman is a former instructor at The National Guitar Workshop, WorkshopLive, and Interlochen Center for the Arts.

== Selected discography ==
=== Albums ===
With The Bihlman Bros:

- Day By Day — 1998
- Sweet Tooth — 2000
- American Son — 2003
- What U Want — 2009

With Son Seals

- Lettin' Go — 2000

With Grinder Blues:

- Grinder Blues — 2014
- El Dos — 2021, The album ranked at #17 among top 20 blues/rock albums.

== Published works ==
- Bihlman, Jeff (2008). Easy soloing for blues guitar : fun lessons for beginning improvisers. Van Nuys, CA: Alfred Publishing Co. ISBN 978-0-7390-5272-3. OCLC 723242870.
