= Hero of the Underworld =

- Official release poster
- Directed by: John David Vincent
- Written by: Tom Malloy
- Produced by: Michelle Alexandria; Michael Boas; Bryce DiCristofalo; Bryan Glass; Tom Malloy; Greg Polisseni; Dean Matthew Ronalds; Thomas Sjölund; Jason Torres; John David Vincent; Christopher J. Wilmot
- Starring: Catherine Mary Stewart; Quinton Aaron; Gabriel Jarret; Chris Ashworth; Nicole Arianna Fox; Krista Kalmus; Tom Malloy; Lisa Varga; Erik Aude; Paulo Benedeti; Mark Irvingsen; Dale Wade Davis; David Josh Lawrence
- Cinematography: John David Vincent
- Edited by: Michael Boas; Frank Reynolds
- Music by: Phil De Chateauvieux
- Distributed by: Gravitas Ventures
- Release date: November 14, 2016
- Running time: 90 minutes
- Country: United States
- Language: English

Hero of the Underworld is a 2016 drama, inspired by writer/actor/producer Tom Malloy's time working in a New York City hotel. The story centers around hotel manager Dylan Berrick, his desire to help a young woman who is assaulted at the hotel, and his struggles with heroin addiction. Tom Malloy stars alongside Nicole Fox, Quinton Aaron, Chris Ashworth, Gabriel Jarret, and David Josh Lawrence, with appearance by Catherine Mary Stewart. The film was shot in Rochester, NY and directed by John David Vincent.

== Plot ==
In the film, Dylan Berrick is the overnight manager of the Century Grand Hotel, a high class establishment. On the outside, Dylan seems to be a consummately professional hotel manager. But in reality, he is dealing with heroin addiction.

One night, a woman, Holly, is nearly beaten to death in the hotel by her boyfriend, and Dylan finds himself acting as Holly’s savior. This includes not only helping her physically, but also rescuing her from the drug underworld that he is too familiar with. This leads them both on a journey that will help save her as well as his own job, sanity and life.

== Cast ==
- Tom Malloy as Dylan
- Nicole Arianna Fox as Holly
- Quinton Aaron as Tino
- Catherine Mary Stewart as Shari
- Gabriel Jarret as Rico
- David Josh Lawrence as Jerrod
- Chris Ashworth as Chris
- Krista Kalmus as Candice
- Lisa Varga as Linda
- Erik Aude as Phillip
- Paulo Benedeti as Cesar
- Mark Irvingsen as Henry
- Dale Wade Davis as Sgt. Baker

== Production ==
Filming of Hero of the Underworld took place in March and April, 2014, in Rochester, NY. Standing in for a New York City hotel was Rochester's Times Square Building. Because the location is a working office building, the production had to work nights, redressing the lobby each night and returning it to normal each morning.

While director John Vincent has experience working with film, in this case he shot in digital format using Black Magic cameras. In speaking about the choice of camera and the location, Vincent said, "We also shot in this amazing art deco building, and we really needed to capture the details of that location."

== Release ==
The film was screened at multiple film festivals, including Atlantic City Cinefest, where Tom Malloy won best actor and John Vincent won best director. The film also screened at Desert Rocks Film and Music Event and Chain NYC Film Festival (winner, best actor, Tom Malloy).

Following festivals, Hero of the Underworld was released by Gravitas Ventures in February, 2017, to streaming video and Blu-ray disc.
