= The Alphabet Killer =

2008 film by Rob Schmidt

- Theatrical release poster
- Directed by: Rob Schmidt
- Written by: Tom Malloy
- Produced by: Tom Malloy; Isen Robbins; Aimee Schoof; Russell Terlecki; Daniel Sollinger
- Starring: Eliza Dushku; Cary Elwes; Andrew Fiscella; Timothy Hutton; Michael Ironside; Martin Donovan; Melissa Leo; Carl Lumbly
- Cinematography: Joe DeSalvo
- Edited by: Frank Reynolds
- Music by: Eric Perlmutter
- Distributed by: Anchor Bay Entertainment
- Release date: November 7, 2008
- Running time: 100 minutes
- Country: United States
- Language: English
- Box office: $106,596

The Alphabet Killer is a 2008 horror thriller film, loosely based on the Alphabet murders that took place in Rochester, New York between 1971 and 1973. Eliza Dushku stars alongside Cary Elwes, Michael Ironside, Bill Moseley and Timothy Hutton. The film is directed by Rob Schmidt, director of Wrong Turn, also starring Dushku, and written by Tom Malloy, who also acted in a supporting role.

== Plot ==
Megan Paige, an investigator for the Rochester Police Department, is investigating the murder of a young girl named Carla Castillo. Her body was found in the nearby village of Churchville, New York, along with traces of white cat hair. Opposing her colleagues, including her boyfriend Captain Kenneth Shine, Megan insists that the murder is the work of a serial killer. Despite Megan's considerable efforts, she fails to catch the killer. Stress and obsession over the investigation causes Megan to hallucinate the victim's image. She ultimately has a nervous breakdown after being kicked off the case and tries to commit suicide.

Following two years of medical treatment and attending a support group headed by a wheelchair-using man named Richard Ledge, Megan rejoins the police department in an office job. Following a similar murder of another young girl, Wendy Walsh, whose body is found in Webster along with some white cat hair, Megan successfully lobbies to rejoin the investigation. She is partnered with Steven Harper, and they try to find links between the victims.

Then another girl, Melissa Maestro, is killed in Macedon. They find a number of commonalities between Wendy and Melissa but fail to connect these to the first victim. The Webster Police Department, who has jurisdiction over the latest murder but are uncooperative, receive a call from 19-year-old Elizabeth Eckers who tells them she is being held hostage in a house. Megan is convinced the suspect is not the Alphabet Killer and breaks procedure to preempt a police raid. Megan almost defuses the situation but an officer shoots the suspect through a window and kills him. Webster police declare that the Alphabet Killer is dead and announce the discovery of white cat hair in the house. Megan spirals into another nervous breakdown.

Certain that the Webster police planted the evidence in order to justify killing an innocent, Megan continues the investigation on her own. Megan discovers that all three girls attended St. Michael's Church in Rochester. Still suffering from hallucinations of the victims, Megan visits the church and tries to question the pastor but has another breakdown and is hospitalized.

Megan escapes the hospital and takes refuge in Ledge's home. There, she finds out that he used to work as the math teacher for the St. Michael's Church, which finally reveals that he is the Alphabet killer. Before she can act, he leaps from his wheelchair – having only pretended to be disabled – and attacks her. Ledge knocks her unconscious and drives to a remote spot near the Genesee River to drown her. Before Ledge can inject her with a sedative and dump her into the river, Megan breaks free and, after a struggle, shoots him in the foot with his own gun. Ledge falls into the river just past a large waterfall, though it's unclear if he is dead or not. Unsure whether Ledge is dead and confused by her surroundings, Megan is driven by the intense situation to another, longer breakdown.

Megan is again hospitalized and kept under intensive psychiatric care. The final scenes of the film show Megan wearing a patient gown, heavily sedated and strapped to a bed in a psychiatric ward. There is no one else in the room, but in her state, she envisions the spirits of the victims waiting for her to return and seek justice for them.

The final scenes of Megan are intercut with scenes of a survived Ledge altering his appearance. He is shown in church, receiving communion and exchanging glances with a potential victim. It is unclear if these scenes of Ledge are actually occurring or are part of Megan's psychosis.

A title card announces: "In 2006, police exhumed a fireman's body and posthumously cleared him as a suspect. To date, the Alphabet Killer has not been found."

== Cast ==
- Eliza Dushku as Megan Paige
- Cary Elwes as Captain Kenneth Shine
- Andrew Fiscella as Len Schafer
- Timothy Hutton as Richard Ledge
- Michael Ironside as Nathan Norcoss
- Martin Donovan as Jim Walsh
- Melissa Leo as Kathy Walsh
- Carl Lumbly as Dr. Ellis Parks
- Tom Malloy as Steven Harper
- Bill Moseley as Carl Tanner
- Tom Noonan as Captain Gullikson
- Bailey Garno as Carla Castillo

== Production ==
From 1970 to 1973, three girls in and around Rochester, New York, were brutally raped and strangled, their bodies dumped in neighboring villages. Each girl's first and last names started with the same letter and matched the initial of the name of the village where their body was found. The film deviates significantly from established facts, most evident by establishing a modern-day setting.

The filmmakers chose to focus on the personal aspect of the story and its impact on the lead character instead of police procedure in the investigation. Writer Tom Malloy developed the script with the help of a homicide investigator who had worked on the original case. The writer noted that he saw the film as a cross between A Beautiful Mind and Zodiac.

Dushku was an immediate choice for the lead role. The filmmakers also deliberately chose certain actors who had earlier played the role of a killer in other films. The film was shot in and around Rochester. The climactic scene was shot near the High Falls of Genesee River.

== Reception ==
=== Release ===
The film was screened at multiple film festivals, including the Screamfest Horror Film Festival. The film had a limited theatrical release in the United States on November 7, 2008, when it was released in 2 theaters, only in New York. As of December 14, 2008, the film's domestic earnings are $29,784 while it grossed $76,812 in the foreign markets for a worldwide total of $106,596.

=== Critical response ===
On Rotten Tomatoes the film holds an approval rating of 13% based on eight critics' reviews.

Gary Goldstein of the Los Angeles Times commended the actors' performances but thought the end was very unsatisfactory. LA Weekly's Luke Thompson said the plot was quite predictable, but he also said that the presence of multiple supporting characters keeps viewers guessing, which made the film very interesting. Jeannette Catsoulis of The New York Times praised Dushku's skills and Schmidt's choice to be "more interested in facts than in frights".
