= Rob Schmidt =

American film director and writer (born 1965)

- Born: September 25, 1965 (age 60); Slippery Rock, Pennsylvania, U.S.
- Occupations: Director; Writer; University professor (film)
- Years active: 2000–present
- Notable work: The Alphabet Killer; Wrong Turn; Crime and Punishment in Suburbia
- Awards: Sundance Film Festival: Grand Jury Prize Dramatic (nominated)

Rob Schmidt Barracano (born September 25, 1965) is an American filmmaker. His film credits include Wrong Turn and Crime and Punishment in Suburbia. He also created a pilot called American Town for Twentieth Century Fox.

Schmidt directed a Masters of Horror episode called "Right to Die". His thriller The Alphabet Killer, which reunited him with Eliza Dushku (Wrong Turn), Martin Donovan ("Right to Die"), and Michael Ironside (Crime and Punishment in Suburbia), was picked up for international distribution by New Films International.

== Filmography ==
- 2018: Fran K: Frankenstein (SyFy TV pilot)
- 2018: Room For Murder
- 2012: Worst Thing About Coming Out
- 2009: Fear Itself: The Spirit Box
- 2008: The Alphabet Killer
- 2007: Masters of Horror: Right to Die
- 2003: Wrong Turn
- 2001: An American Town (TV series)
- 2000: Crime and Punishment in Suburbia
