= Love N' Dancing =

Love 'N' Dancing
- Theatrical release poster
- Directed by: Robert Iscove
- Written by: Tom Malloy
- Produced by: Samuel Benedict
- Starring: Amy Smart; Tom Malloy; Billy Zane
- Cinematography: Frank Byers
- Edited by: Casey O. Rohrs
- Music by: Matt Seigel
- Distributed by: Screen Media Films
- Release date: April 2, 2009 (Phoenix Film Festival)
- Running time: 95 minutes
- Country: United States
- Language: English
- Budget: $10 million
- Box office: $73,848

Love 'N' Dancing is a 2009 American romantic drama film about a couple who take part in a competition in the world of swing dancing. The film was directed by Robert Iscove, and stars Amy Smart, Tom Malloy (who also wrote the film), and Billy Zane. Jeff Bihlman and Scot Bihlman (The Bihlman Brothers) contributed seven original songs to the film's soundtrack. Love 'N' Dancing garnered negative reviews from critics.

== Plot ==
Jessica Donovan is engaged to workaholic Kent and they decide to take dancing classes for their wedding. However, Kent is so busy with his work that he misses all of the lessons. Jessica, however, develops a liking for dancing, and ultimately, for the dance teacher Jake. Jake is deaf (he uses hearing aids) but is a two-time former US Open Swing Dancing Champion. His former partner Corrine is now a judge in the Open Tournaments. Jake and Corrine also have a history as they were engaged but Corrine cheated on him which ultimately led to their break up.

With every lesson, Jessica's interest in both dancing and Jake increases dramatically. At the same time, her fiancé's behaviour becomes unpleasant; partly because she is too busy to cook at home, and partly because he is jealous that she spends too much time dancing with Jake.

Jessica shows both skill and talent; Jake asks her to participate in the National Open Swing competition. This leads to more unpleasantness between her and Kent and eventually she breaks up with him. Jake and Jessica also realize they have great chemistry and finally express their feelings for another just before it is time to participate in the competition.

At the competition, Corrine is on the panel of judges for this dance. Jake and Jessica manage to dance well and avoid the post-performance bickering of many of the other couples. A series of "where are they now" titles then reveals the future trajectories of the major characters.

== Cast ==
- Amy Smart as Jessica Donovan
- Tom Malloy as Jake Mitchell
- Billy Zane as Kent Krandel
- Caroline Rhea as Bonnie
- Nicola Royston as Corrine Kennedy
- Leila Arcieri as Danielle
- Rachel Dratch as Kalle
- Betty White as Irene

== Background ==
On May 9, 2007, Amy Smart joined the project with production starting on July 16 at Albuquerque, New Mexico. On March 23, 2009, Screen Media Films acquired the film's distribution rights.

== Response ==
=== Box office ===
The film didn't perform well at the box office due to its widest release in very few theaters, earning $47,812 in domestic theaters and $26,036 from foreign theaters. The film grossed $73,848 worldwide.

=== Critical reception ===
Love N' Dancing received mostly negative reviews from the critics. On review aggregator Rotten Tomatoes, the film holds an approval rating of 17% based on twelve reviews, with an average rating of 3.3/10. On Metacritic, the film has a weighted average score of 43 out of 100, based on four critics, indicating "mixed or average" reviews.

Peter Debruge of Variety wrote that: "Malloy's chemistry-killing additions to the proven formula push the experience toward mawkishness when the otherwise by-the-numbers pic means to be inspirational, limiting interest in this low-budget indie to the apologetically sincere or ironically inclined." Paste contributor Sean Gandert criticized the "impossibly lazy and clichéd" story and Iscove for putting more focus on shooting the "admittedly alluring dance sequences" than constructing something "perfunctory" for the rest of the film, concluding that "a few pretty dances aren't enough substance to make for a fulfilling, or even moderately entertaining movie when the rest of the material is so weak." Chuck Wilson of LA Weekly commended Smart for bringing a spark to this "amiably dull dance drama" and the "terrific numbers" but criticized Iscove for keeping a "coolly professional distance" from the dancers and diminishing their chemistry. Robert Abele of the Los Angeles Times wrote that despite Smart and Malloy's character arcs and the "nicely done twirl-and-dip sections" by Robert Royston, he felt it was "pretty unremarkable stuff", concluding that "with by-the-numbers characters and a woefully predictable script, you'll mostly be tapping your feet as a waiting measure for the next time "Love N' Dancing" needs two people to step out on the floor." In a 2019 retrospective review, Janelle Tipton of Backstage commended Smart and Malloy's "charm and chemistry" for going through "contrived plot points and clunky obligatory dialogue for believability", the supporting performances of Zane and Rhea, and Iscove's filmmaking showing restraint in doing "flashy camerawork" with the dance scenes, concluding that: "Love N' Dancing tries for offbeat and thus generates moments of unexpected humor, but it doesn't have quite enough quirk to work. Nor is the terpsichorean talent enough to recommend it."

Amy Smart was nominated for Choice Movie Actress: Music/Dance at the 2009 Teen Choice Awards for her work in the film, but ultimately lost to Miley Cyrus for Hannah Montana: The Movie.
