= Lisa Varga =

American actress

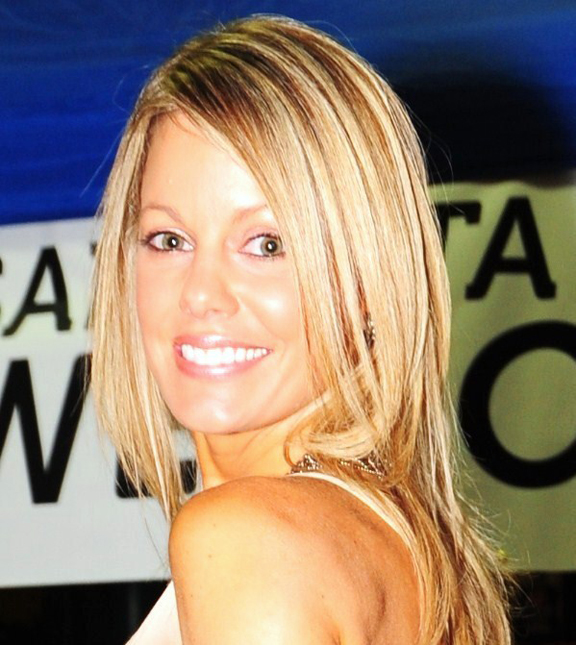
- Born: Lisa Varga; April 8, 1971 (age 55); South Bend, Indiana, U.S.
- Occupations: Producer, Actress, TV Host, Model
- Years active: 1987–present
- Website: lisavarga.com

Lisa Varga (born April 8, 1971) is an American actress, producer, writer, model, and television host. Her acting roles include Homeland (2011), NBC television movie Game Time: Tackling the Past (2011) as Karen Walker, and Marley & Me (2008). She is currently the host and producer of Beyond The Offseason with Lisa Varga, a series about athletes and charity. She is also the creator, writer, producer, and host of a new music entertainment series called Nashville Live. Varga has her own production company, Lisa Varga Entertainment.

== Personal life ==
Varga was born in South Bend, Indiana, and graduated from John Adams High School. She started modeling at the age of 16. She then decided to pursue an acting career and moved to Los Angeles.

Lisa Varga and her brother, Shane Varga, founded the non-profit, Fight Club for Cancer, which uses sports, entertainment and events together to raise awareness and support efforts to educate people about cancer. Her brother, Shane, was the inspiration behind Beyond The Offseason with Lisa Varga.

== Career ==
In 2017, Lisa Varga created a music series called Nashville Live. Varga is the creator, writer, producer, and host. She also produced, and had an acting role in a feature film called Crowning Jules, which was acquired by Sony Pictures, and has foreign and domestic distribution.

In 2014, Lisa Varga began filming the pilot for the television series, Alexis Ronan, where she plays the title role, Alexis Ronan, a powerful attorney who searches to find justice for her missing son. She also hosts Beyond The Offseason with Lisa Varga, a show that features athletes, teams, and coaches giving back to charity in their offseason.

Her film and TV credits include Homeland (2011), Game Time: Tackling the Past (2011) , the starring role in Armed and Deadly (2011) - and won the " Best Actress " award at the 2011 Movieville International Film Festival, Marley & Me (2008), Austin Powers: The Spy Who Shagged Me (1999), America's Most Wanted: America Fights Back (2008), Rudy (1993), and Walker, Texas Ranger (1993). Varga won the best actress award as Janis McKenzie in Armed and Deadly at the Movieville International Film Festival.

Lisa Varga began her hosting career working as a sideline reporter for Friday Night Football, and then went on to co-host for a series called W - The Women's Show. Varga was also a guest host on HSN.

== Filmography ==
=== Film ===
| Year | Title | Role | Notes |
|---|---|---|---|
| 1993 | Rudy | College Student (uncredited) | Film |
| 1997 | The Corporate Ladder | Makeup Artist (uncredited) | Film |
| 1998 | The Hunted | Samantha Lopez | Film |
| 1998 | Rusty: A Dog's Tale | Mother with Baby | Film |
| 1998 | Overdrive | Clara | Film |
| 1999 | Austin Powers: The Spy Who Shagged Me | Sexy Nurse (uncredited) | Film |
| 2008 | La fidanzata di papà | Wedding Guest | Film |
| 2008 | Marley & Me | Still Photographer | Film |
| 2011 | Deadly Closure | Janice McKenzie | Film |
| 2011 | Armed and Deadly | Janice McKenzie | Film |
| 2015 | Fair Haven | Patricia Thomas | Film |
| 2015 | Hero of the Underworld | Linda | Film |
| 2017 | Crowning Jules | Ruth Jeter | Film |

=== Television ===
| Year | Title | Role | Notes |
|---|---|---|---|
| 1993 | Walker, Texas Ranger | Secretary (uncredited) | TV series |
| 1996 | Dark Skies | Neighbor (uncredited) | TV series |
| 2008 | America's Most Wanted: America Fights Back | Cheryl | 2 episodes |
| 2011 | Homeland | Demmie | Episode: "Semper I" |
| 2011 | Game Time: Tackling the Past | Karen Walker | TV movie |
| 2015 | Alexis Ronan | Alexis Ronan | TV series (In Production) |
| 2015 | Beyond the Offseason with Lisa Varga | Herself (Host) | Series |
| 2017 | Nashville Live | Herself (Host) | TV series (Production) |
