= Stuart Spencer (political consultant) =

American political consultant (1927–2025)

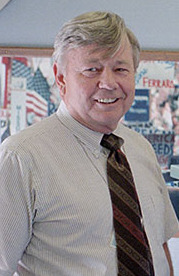
- On Air Force One, 1984

Personal details
- Born: Stuart Krieg Murphy; February 20, 1927 Phoenix, Arizona, U.S.
- Died: January 12, 2025 (aged 97) Palm Desert, California, U.S.
- Party: Republican
- Spouses: Joan Dikeman (divorced); Barbara Callihan (m. 1992)
- Children: 2
- Education: East Los Angeles College; Cal State LA (BA)

Military service
- Branch: United States Navy
- Service years: 1945–1946

Stuart Krieg Spencer (né Murphy; February 20, 1927 – January 12, 2025) was an American political consultant. As co-founder of Spencer-Roberts, he and his firm managed over 400 Republican political campaigns, including both of Ronald Reagan's campaigns for governor of California and his 1980 and 1984 campaigns for president.

== Life and career ==
Stuart Murphy was born in Phoenix, Arizona on February 20, 1927. His father abandoned the family, and Stuart's surname was changed to Spencer after his mother re-married, to California dentist A. Kenneth Spencer. Spencer grew up in Alhambra, California, where he took after his adoptive father's involvement in Republican politics. He served in the United States Navy from 1945 to 1946, and then graduated from the East Los Angeles Junior College with an Associate of Arts, and from California State University, Los Angeles, with a Bachelor of Arts in sociology in 1951.

== Career ==
Spencer-Roberts & Associates, Inc., was established in California in 1960 with Bill Roberts. They were among the first professional campaign managers. In 1962, he managed Tom Kuchel's campaign for United States Senate in California. After that, he managed Nelson Rockefeller's presidential campaign of 1964, and Don Riegle's run for Congress, Michigan, in 1966.

He ran Ronald Reagan's gubernatorial campaign in California in 1966. That year, Reagan told Spencer that "Politics is just like show business. You have a hell of an opening, coast for a while, and then have a hell of a close." He also ran Reagan's gubernatorial campaign in 1970, and his presidential campaigns in 1980 and 1984.

Stuart Spencer became the sole owner of Spencer-Roberts in 1974. In 1976 he served as Deputy Chairman for Political Organization in Gerald Ford's presidential re-election campaign. When he served as Reagan's campaign manager in 1980, he suggested that he choose George H. W. Bush as his running mate, but later recounted that Reagan was not keen on the idea, apparently because Reagan did not like Bush.

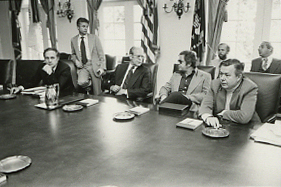
Spencer with President Gerald Ford and Chief of Staff Dick Cheney.

Spencer voted Democratic for president only twice in his life: in the 1948 election, he supported Harry S. Truman, as he felt he "owed him one" due to Truman's decision to drop atomic bombs over Hiroshima and Nagasaki, which prevented him from having to fight in Japan during his Navy service. His second Democratic vote was for Joe Biden in the 2020 election, as he refused to support Donald Trump, whom he labeled a "demagogue and an opportunist"; in 2016, he had voted for Gary Johnson of the Libertarian Party.

== Personal life and death ==
Spencer was first married to Joan Dikeman, with whom he had two children before divorcing; he later married Barbara Callihan in 1992.

Spencer died at his home in Palm Desert, California, on January 12, 2025, at the age of 97.
