= List of Great White band members =

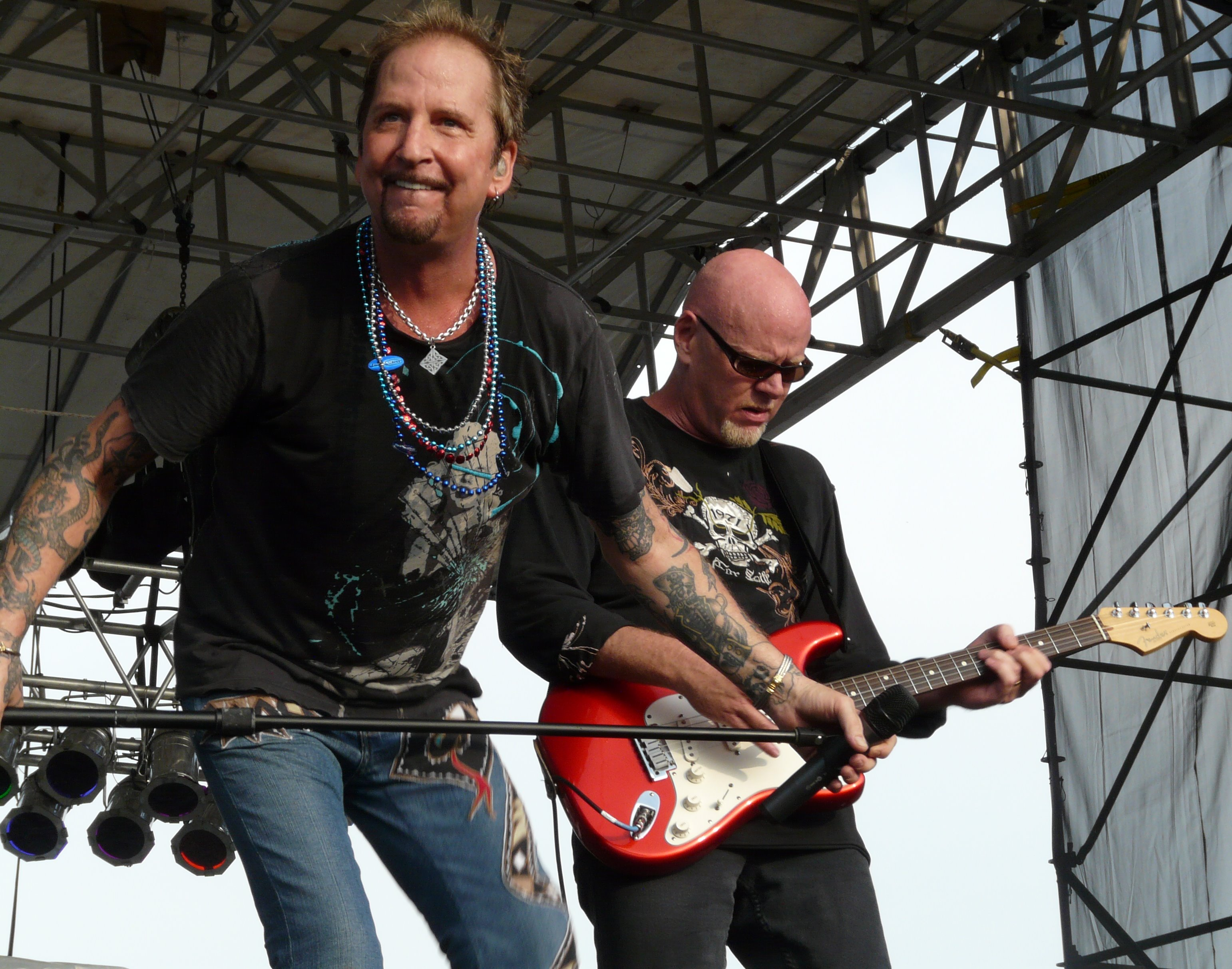
Jack Russell and Mark Kendall of Great White performing live in 2008

Great White is an American hard rock band from Los Angeles, California. Formed in 1979, the group was originally known as Dante Fox and consisted of lead vocalist Lisa Baker, guitarist Mark Kendall, bassist Don Costa and drummer Tony Richards. The band's current lineup includes Kendall alongside guitarist and keyboardist Michael Lardie, drummer Audie Desbrow (both of whom originally joined in 1985 and rejoined in 2006), bassist Scott Snyder (since 2008) and lead vocalist Brett Carlisle (since 2022).

From December 2011 until 2024, former Great White vocalist Jack Russell performed with his own version of the band called Great White featuring Jack Russell (formerly Jack Russell's Great White). The group's final lineup included lead guitarist Robby Lochner (who joined in 2011), rhythm guitarist Tony Montana (former bassist for Great White who joined Russell's band in 2013), bassist Dan McNay (who joined in 2016) and drummer Ken Mary (who joined in 2023, though his tenure started as a touring guest throughout 2022). Russell retired because of illness in July 2024 and died the following month.

== History ==
=== 1977–1987: Early years ===
Jack Russell and Mark Kendall first met in 1977. The pair worked together in bands with several names and lineups, before Russell was arrested for shooting a live-in maid in 1978. Kendall subsequently formed Dante Fox the next year with vocalist Lisa Baker, bassist Don Costa and drummer Tony Richards. Baker joined George Lynch's Xciter after around six months, with Butch Say taking her place. After 18 months in prison, Russell was released and almost immediately took over as Dante Fox frontman. By late 1982, both Costa and Richards had left Dante Fox to join newly-formed W.A.S.P.

Costa and Richards were replaced by Lorne Black and Gary Holland, respectively. Before the end of the year, the group changed its name to Great White and released its debut EP On Your Knees on the independent label Enigma Records. The band subsequently signed with Alan Niven's new label Aegean Records and released Out of the Night in 1983. This was followed by the group's self-titled full-length debut in 1984. By 1986, Holland had been replaced by Audie Desbrow, and Michael Lardie had joined on rhythm guitar and keyboards; both debuted Shot in the Dark, released the same year.

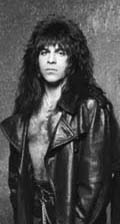
Bassist Dave Spitz appeared as a guest contributor on Psycho City and Let It Rock.

=== 1987–2001: Later work ===
Shortly after the release of Great White's third studio album Once Bitten in June 1987, Lorne Black was replaced by Tony Montana. The new bassist performed on ...Twice Shy (1989) and Hooked (1991) before leaving in early 1992 during rehearsals for Psycho City, with Dave "The Beast" Spitz taking over for the album's recording. For the subsequent tour, former Dio bassist Teddy Cook joined the band. Cook remained for just one studio album, Sail Away, before he was fired for being a "poser" – in late 1995, Spitz stepped in again to record Let It Rock. Former Quiet Riot bassist Sean McNabb joined for the subsequent tour.

Great White issued Great Zeppelin: A Tribute to Led Zeppelin in 1998 and Can't Get There from Here in 1999, before undergoing a string of lineup changes. First to leave was founding member Mark Kendall, who announced his departure on January 20, 2000. Matthew Johnson (Who worked on Russell's first solo album) took his place the next month. Matthew Johnson had left next, replaced by Ty Longley in July. In September, drummer Audie Desbrow announced his departure, claiming that he had been fired. He was followed by McNabb. Russell opted to continue touring, adding Longley's Samantha 7 bandmates Krys Baratto on bass and Francis Ruiz on drums. In August 2001, Mcnabb and Kendall would rejoin the band. By November 2001, however, Russell had decided to disband the group. A final show on New Year's Eve, featuring Kendall, Lardie, McNabb and drummer Derrick Pontier (Pontier had filled in for Ruiz throughout 2001) on was released as Thank You... Goodnight! in 2002.

=== 2002–2011: Reformation ===
Less than a year after Great White disbanded, Jack Russell reunited with Mark Kendall in November 2002 under the moniker "Jack Russell's Great White", with a lineup including second guitarist Ty Longley, bassist David Filice, drummer Eric Powers and keyboardist Yuko Tamura. The group embarked on a tour, which was cut short on February 20, 2003, when a pyrotechnics accident at the start of their performance caused The Station nightclub fire. Among the 100 people killed in the fire was Longley, who was initially reported missing but reported dead four days later.

A few months after the fire, Jack Russell's Great White began touring to raise money for the families of the victims, with Russell and Kendall joined by guitarist and keyboardist Jordan Martin (Later replaced by Tyler Nelson the following year), bassist Scott Pounds and drummer Derrick Pontier. Touring continued until August 2005, when all future dates were cancelled due to undisclosed "medical reasons". In December 2006, a reunion of Russell, Kendall, Michael Lardie, Sean McNabb and Audie Desbrow was announced to mark the band's 25th anniversary. Back to the Rhythm, the first Great White studio album since 1999, was released in 2007.

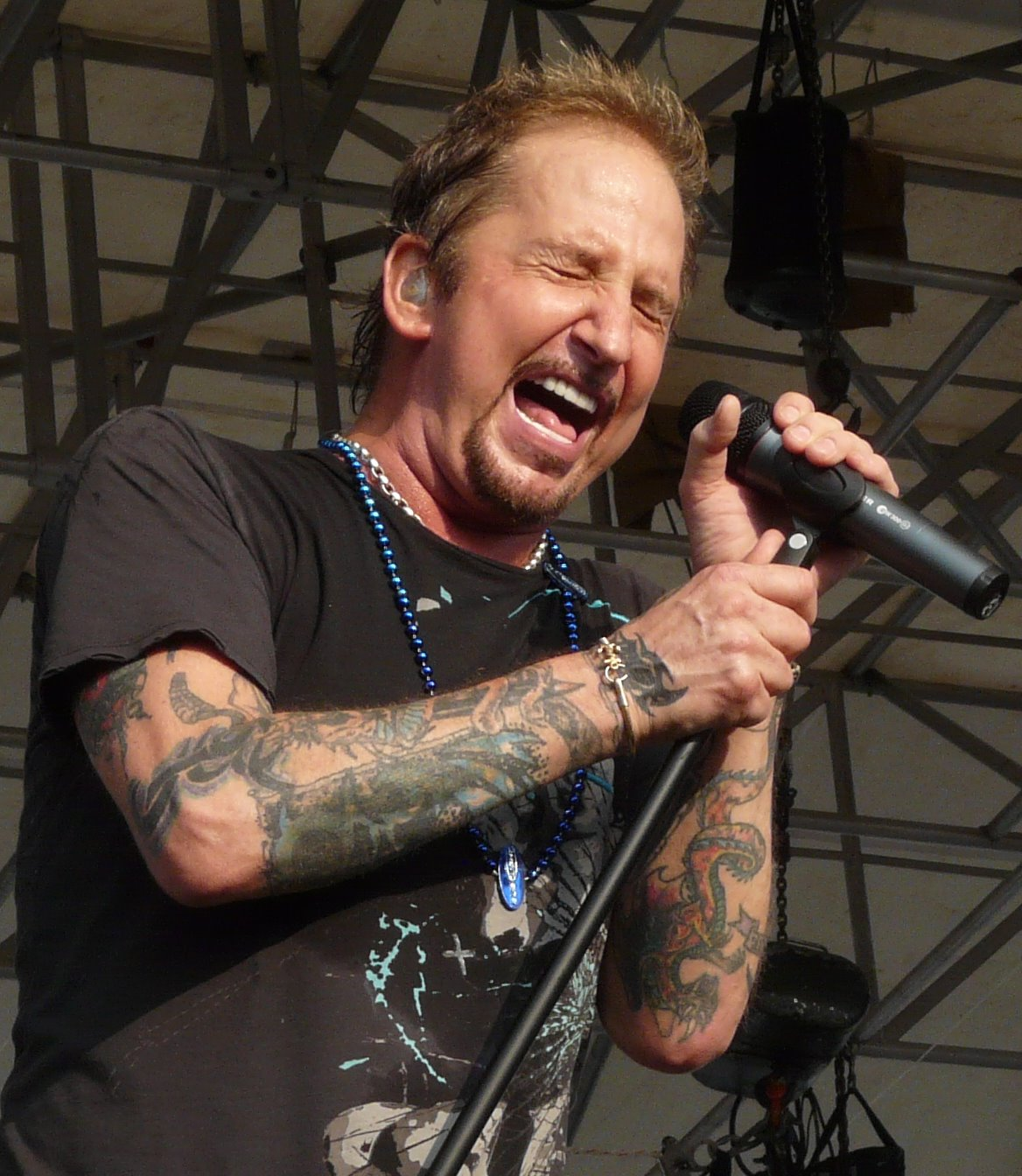
Jack Russell took a break in 2010 due to medical reasons, before forming his own version of the group in 2011.

During a tour in 2008, McNabb decided to leave Great White. He was replaced that May by Scott Snyder. He debuted on Rising, issued early the next year. During the subsequent tour, Russell was forced to take a break to undergo surgery for a perforated bowel. He was temporarily replaced by XYZ's Terry Ilous. After one show with former Rough Cutt and Quiet Riot frontman Paul Shortino, former Warrant vocalist Jani Lane took over for a run of shows later in the year. Ilous returned in early 2011, although it was planned that Russell would return once he had recovered from surgery. By December, however, he had formed his own version of the band, with Ilous remaining in the main group.

=== Since 2011: Two bands ===
The first lineup of Jack Russell's Great White included Russell alongside two former members of Great White (then lead guitarist Matthew Johnson, now doing rhythm guitar, and drummer Derrick Pontier), as well as guitarist Robby Lochner and bassist Dario Seixas. By the time of their first live date, Evan Haymond would, temporarily, replace Matthew Johnson for their first live date. After the band was renamed "Great White featuring Jack Russell", Seixas was replaced by former Great White bassist Tony Montana in July 2013. Evan Haymond would again replace Matthew Johnson in August. Later on in the year, Pontier was replaced by Dicki Fliszar.

Following Haymond's second departure the following year, Montana switched to guitar, as Chris Tristram took over on bass; this lineup released the group's first single, "Hard Habit", in 2014. By 2016, Tristram had been replaced by Dan McNay. The band released He Saw It Comin' in 2017 and Once Bitten Acoustic Bytes in 2020. In 2021, the band released Great Zeppelin II, a "sequel album" to Great Zeppelin. Additionally, Michael Oliveieri had filled in for Tony Montana for this album. Dicki Fliszar would later on be replaced by Ken Mary in early 2023, with Mary having filled in for Filszar throughout 2022.

The lineup of the original Great White remained stable from Russell's 2011 departure until 2018, releasing studio albums Elation in 2012 and Full Circle in 2017, and live albums 30 Years: Live from the Sunset Strip in 2013 and Metal Meltdown in 2016. In July 2018, the group fired Terry Ilous and replaced him with Mitch Malloy. The new vocalist remained until May 2022, when he was replaced by Andrew Freeman, who was later replaced by Brett Carlisle in October of the same year. Throughout early 2024, Ian Smith of All or Nothing (Of which Carlisle is also the lead vocalist of), filled in for Scott Snyder, who had undergone back surgery. On July 17, 2024, Jack Russell announced that he was retiring from touring, following "a recent diagnosis of Lewy body dementia and multiple system atrophy" from May of that year. He died nearly a month after the announcement, on August 7, 2024, at the age of 63.

== Members ==
=== Current Great White members ===
Image	Name	Years active	Instruments	Release contributions
	Mark Kendall	1977–2000; 2001; 2006–present	lead guitar; percussion; backing vocals; rhythm guitar (1978-1986)	all Great White releases
	Audie Desbrow	1985–2000; 2006–present	drums; percussion	all Great White releases from Shot in the Dark (1986) onwards, except Thank You... Goodnight! (2002)
	Michael Lardie	1986–2001; 2006–present; (Additional Personnel and touring guest 1984–1986)	rhythm guitar; keyboards; mandolin; sitar; banjo; harmonica; percussion; flute; backing vocals	all Great White releases from Shot in the Dark (As additional musician) (1986) onwards
	Scott Snyder	2008–present	bass; backing vocals	all Great White releases from Rising (2009) onwards
	Brett Carlisle	2022–present (Touring guest 2022)	lead vocals	none

=== Former Great White members ===
Image	Name	Years active	Instruments	Release contributions
	Don Costa	1979–1982	bass	The Roots of Great White 1978–1982 (2019)
	Tony Richards	1979–1982 (died 2026)	drums; percussion; backing vocals	The Roots of Great White 1978–1982 (2019)
	Lisa Baker	1979	lead vocals	none
	Butch Say	1979–1980	lead vocals	none
	Jack Russell	1980–2001; 2006–2011; (inactive 2010–11) (died 2024)	lead vocals	all Great White releases from Out of the Night (1983) to Rising (2009); The Roots of Great White 1978–1982 (2019)
	Lorne Black	1982–1987 (died 2013)	bass; backing vocals	all Great White releases from Out of the Night (1983) to Recovery: Live! (1988); The Roots of Great White 1978–1982 (2019)
	Gary Holland	1982–1985	drums; percussion; backing vocals	Out of the Night (1983); Great White (1984); Recovery: Live! (1988); The Roots of Great White 1978–1982 (2019)
	Tony Montana	1987–1992	bass; backing vocals (live performances only)	all Great White releases from ...Twice Shy (1989) to The Blue EP (1991); Recover (2002)
	Dave Spitz	1992 (session); 1995 (session)	bass	Psycho City (1992); Let It Rock (1996)
	Teddy Cook	1992–1995	bass; backing vocals	Sail Away (1994); Anaheim Live (1994); Stage (1995)
	Sean McNabb	1996–2000; 2001; 2006–2008	bass; backing vocals	Great Zeppelin (1998); Can't Get There from Here (1999); Thank You... Goodnight! (2002); Back to the Rhythm (2007)
	Matthew Johnson	2000	lead guitar; backing vocals	none
	Ty Longley	2000–2001 (died 2003)	lead guitar; backing vocals	none
	Krys Baratto	2000–2001	bass; backing vocals	none
	Francis Ruiz	2000–2001 (inactive 2001)	drums; percussion	none
	Derrick Pontier	2001 (Initially touring guest)	drums; percussion	Thank You... Goodnight! (2002)
	Terry Ilous	2012–2018 (guest vocalist 2010–2012)	lead vocals	all Great White releases from Elation (2012) to Full Circle (2017)
	Paul Shortino	2010 (one show)	lead vocals	none
	Jani Lane	2010 (guest vocalist on tour) (died 2011)	lead vocals	none
	Mitch Malloy	2018–2022 (Guest appearance one show 2018)	lead vocals	Live (2020)
	Andrew Freeman	2022	lead vocals	none
	Ian Smith	2024 (Touring guest)	bass; backing vocals	none

=== Jack Russell's Great White ===
Image	Name	Years active	Instruments	Release contributions
	Jack Russell	2002–2005; 2011–2024 (died 2024)	lead vocals; percussion	all Jack Russell's Great White releases
	Mark Kendall	2002–2005	lead guitar; rhythm guitar (2002–2003); backing vocals	none
	Ty Longley	2002–2003 (until his death)	rhythm and lead guitars; backing vocals	none
	David Filice	2002–2003	bass; backing vocals	none
	Yuko Tamura	2002–2003	keyboards	none
	Eric Powers	2002–2003	drums; percussion	none
	Derrick Pontier	2003–2005; 2011–2014	drums; percussion	none
	Scott Pounds	2003–2005	bass; backing vocals	none
	Jordan Martin	2003–2004	rhythm guitar; keyboards; backing vocals	none
	Tyler Nelson	2004–2005	rhythm guitar; keyboards; backing vocals	none
	Robby Lochner	2011–2024	lead guitar; percussion; backing vocals	all Jack Russell's Great White releases
	Dario Seixas	2011–2013	bass; backing vocals	none
	Matthew Johnson	2011; 2012–2013	rhythm guitar; keyboards; backing vocals	none
	Evan Haymond	2012; 2013 (guest appearances 2016)	rhythm guitar; keyboards; backing vocals	none
	Tony Montana	2013–2024	bass (2013); rhythm guitar; keyboards; backing vocals	all Jack Russell's Great White releases, except for Great Zeppelin II: A Tribute To Led Zeppelin (2021)
	Dicki Fliszar	2013–2023 (inactive 2022-2023, guest appearances 2023–2024)	drums; percussion; backing vocals	all Jack Russell's Great White releases from "Hard Habit" (2014) to Great Zeppelin II: A Tribute To Led Zeppelin (2021)
	Chris Tristram	2014–2016	bass; backing vocals	"Hard Habit" (2014)
	Dan McNay	2016–2024	bass; backing vocals	He Saw It Comin (2017); Once Bitten Acoustic Bytes (2020); Great Zeppelin II: A Tribute To Led Zeppelin (2021)
	Ken Mary	2023–2024 (touring 2022–2023)	drums; percussion; backing vocals	None
	Michael Olivieri	2021; 2023 (touring both instances)	rhythm guitar; keyboards; backing vocals	Great Zeppelin II: A Tribute To Led Zeppelin (2021)
	Nate Peck	2023 (touring guest)	co-lead vocals on "Save Your Love"	None

== Lineups ==
=== Dante Fox/Great White ===
Period	Members	Releases
1979 (as Dante Fox)	Mark Kendall – guitars, backing vocals; Don Costa – bass; Tony Richards – drums, backing vocals; Lisa Baker – lead vocals	none
1979–1980 (as Dante Fox)	Mark Kendall – guitars, backing vocals; Don Costa – bass; Tony Richards – drums, backing vocals; Butch Say – lead vocals	none
1980–1982 (as Dante Fox)	Mark Kendall – guitars, backing vocals; Don Costa – bass; Tony Richards – drums, backing vocals; Jack Russell – lead vocals	The Roots of Great White 1978–1982 (2019)
Late 1982 (as Dante Fox)	Mark Kendall – guitars, backing vocals; Jack Russell – lead vocals; Lorne Black – bass, backing vocals; Gary Holland – drums, backing vocals	The Roots of Great White 1978–1982 (2019)
Late 1982 – January 1985	Mark Kendall – guitars, backing vocals; Jack Russell – lead vocals; Lorne Black – bass, backing vocals; Gary Holland – drums, backing vocals	On Your Knees (1982); Out of the Night (1983); Great White (1984); Recovery: Live! (1988)
January 1985 – summer 1987	Mark Kendall – lead guitar, backing vocals; Jack Russell – lead vocals; Lorne Black – bass, backing vocals; Michael Lardie – rhythm guitar, keyboards, co-lead vocals; Audie Desbrow – drums, percussion	Shot in the Dark (1986); Once Bitten (1987); Recovery: Live! (1988)
Summer 1987 – early 1992	Mark Kendall – lead guitar, backing vocals; Jack Russell – lead vocals; Michael Lardie – rhythm guitar, keyboards, co-lead vocals; Audie Desbrow – drums, percussion; Tony Montana – bass, backing vocals	...Twice Shy (1989); Live in London (1990); Hooked (1991); The Blue EP (1991); Recover (2002)
Spring – summer 1992	Mark Kendall – lead guitar, backing vocals; Jack Russell – lead vocals; Michael Lardie – rhythm guitar, keyboards, co-lead vocals; Audie Desbrow – drums, percussion; Dave Spitz – bass (session guest)	Psycho City (1992)
Summer 1992 – fall 1995	Mark Kendall – lead guitar, backing vocals; Jack Russell – lead vocals; Michael Lardie – rhythm guitar, keyboards, co-lead vocals; Audie Desbrow – drums, percussion; Teddy Cook – bass, backing vocals	Sail Away (1994); Anaheim Live (1994); Stage (1995)
Late 1995	Jack Russell – lead vocals; Mark Kendall – lead guitar, backing vocals; Michael Lardie – rhythm guitar, keyboards, co-lead vocals; Audie Desbrow – drums, percussion; Dave Spitz – bass (session guest)	Let It Rock (1996)
Early 1996 – January 2000	Mark Kendall – lead guitar, backing vocals; Jack Russell – lead vocals; Michael Lardie – rhythm guitar, keyboards, co-lead vocals; Audie Desbrow – drums, percussion; Sean McNabb – bass, backing vocals	Great Zeppelin (1998); Can't Get There from Here (1999)
February – July 2000	Jack Russell – lead vocals; Michael Lardie – rhythm guitar, keyboards, backing vocals; Audie Desbrow – drums, percussion; Sean McNabb – bass, backing vocals; Matthew Johnson – lead guitar, co-lead vocals	none
July – September 2000	Jack Russell – lead vocals; Michael Lardie – rhythm guitar, keyboards, co-lead vocals; Audie Desbrow – drums, percussion; Sean McNabb – bass, backing vocals; Ty Longley – lead guitar, backing vocals	none
Late 2000 – early 2001	Jack Russell – lead vocals; Michael Lardie – rhythm guitar, keyboards, co-lead vocals; Ty Longley – lead guitar, backing vocals; Krys Baratto – bass, backing vocals; Francis Ruiz – drums, percussion	none
Early 2001 - August 2001	Jack Russell – lead vocals; Michael Lardie – rhythm guitar, keyboards, co-lead vocals; Ty Longley – lead guitar, backing vocals; Krys Baratto – bass, backing vocals; Derrick Pontier – drums, percussion (touring guest)	none
August - December 2001	Jack Russell – lead vocals; Michael Lardie – rhythm guitar, keyboards, co-lead vocals; Derrick Pontier – drums, percussion; Mark Kendall – lead guitar, backing vocals; Sean McNabb – bass, backing vocals	Thank You... Goodnight! (2002)
Band inactive January 2002 – December 2006
December 2006 – May 2008	Jack Russell – lead vocals; Michael Lardie – rhythm guitar, keyboards, co-lead vocals; Mark Kendall – lead guitar, backing vocals; Sean McNabb – bass, backing vocals; Audie Desbrow – drums, percussion	Back to the Rhythm (2007)
May 2008 – August 2010	Jack Russell – lead vocals; Michael Lardie – rhythm guitar, keyboards, co-lead vocals; Mark Kendall – lead guitar, backing vocals; Audie Desbrow – drums, percussion; Scott Snyder – bass, backing vocals	Rising (2009)
August – September 2010	Michael Lardie – rhythm guitar, keyboards, co-lead vocals; Mark Kendall – lead guitar, backing vocals; Audie Desbrow – drums, percussion; Scott Snyder – bass, backing vocals; Terry Ilous – lead vocals (touring guest)	none
September 2010 (one show)	Michael Lardie – rhythm guitar, keyboards, co-lead vocals; Mark Kendall – lead guitar, backing vocals; Audie Desbrow – drums, percussion; Scott Snyder – bass, backing vocals; Paul Shortino – lead vocals (touring guest)	none
September – December 2010	Michael Lardie – rhythm guitar, keyboards, co-lead vocals; Mark Kendall – lead guitar, backing vocals; Scott Snyder – bass, backing vocals; Audie Desbrow – drums, percussion; Jani Lane – lead vocals (touring guest)	none
Early – late 2011	Michael Lardie – rhythm guitar, keyboards, co-lead vocals; Mark Kendall – lead guitar, backing vocals; Scott Snyder – bass, backing vocals; Audie Desbrow – drums, percussion; Terry Ilous – lead vocals (touring guest)	none
December 2011 – July 2018	Michael Lardie – rhythm guitar, keyboards, co-lead vocals; Mark Kendall – lead guitar, backing vocals; Scott Snyder – bass, backing vocals; Audie Desbrow – drums, percussion; Terry Ilous – lead vocals	Elation (2012); 30 Years: Live from the Sunset Strip (2013); Metal Meltdown (2016); Full Circle (2017)
July 2018 – May 2022	Michael Lardie – rhythm guitar, keyboards, co-lead vocals; Mark Kendall – lead guitar, backing vocals; Scott Snyder – bass, backing vocals; Audie Desbrow – drums, percussion; Mitch Malloy – lead vocals	Live (2020)
May 2022 – October 2022	Michael Lardie – rhythm guitar, keyboards, co-lead vocals; Mark Kendall – lead guitar, backing vocals; Audie Desbrow – drums, percussion; Scott Snyder – bass, backing vocals; Andrew Freeman – lead vocals	none
October 2022 – present	Michael Lardie – rhythm guitar, keyboards, co-lead vocals; Mark Kendall – lead guitar, backing vocals; Audie Desbrow – drums, percussion; Scott Snyder – bass, backing vocals; Brett Carlisle – lead vocals	None to date
January 2024 – March 2024	Michael Lardie – rhythm guitar, keyboards, co-lead vocals; Mark Kendall – lead guitar, backing vocals; Audie Desbrow – drums, percussion; Brett Carlisle – lead vocals; Ian Smith – bass, backing vocals (Touring Guest)	none

=== Jack Russell's Great White ===
Period	Members	Releases
November 2002 – February 2003	Jack Russell – lead vocals; Mark Kendall – lead guitar, backing vocals; Ty Longley – rhythm guitar, backing vocals; David Filice – bass, backing vocals; Eric Powers – drums, percussion; Yuko Tamura – keyboards	none
May 2003 – February 2004 (As Great White)	Jack Russell – lead vocals; Mark Kendall – lead guitar, backing vocals; Derrick Pontier – drums, percussion; Jordan Martin – rhythm guitar, keyboards, co-lead vocals; Scott Pounds – bass, backing vocals	none
February 2004 - August 2005 (As Great White)	Jack Russell – lead vocals; Mark Kendall – lead guitar, backing vocals; Derrick Pontier – drums, percussion; Scott Pounds – bass, backing vocals; Tyler Nelson – rhythm guitar, keyboards, co-lead vocals	none
Band inactive August 2005 – December 2011
December 2011	Jack Russell – lead vocals; Derrick Pontier – drums, percussion; Robby Lochner – lead guitar, backing vocals; Matthew Johnson – rhythm guitar, keyboards, co-lead vocals; Dario Seixas – bass, backing vocals	none
January 2012	Jack Russell – lead vocals; Derrick Pontier – drums, percussion; Robby Lochner – lead guitar, backing vocals; Dario Seixas – bass, backing vocals; Evan Haymond – rhythm guitar, co-lead vocals	none
January 2012 - July 2013	Jack Russell – lead vocals; Derrick Pontier – drums, percussion; Robby Lochner – lead guitar, backing vocals; Dario Seixas – bass, backing vocals; Matthew Johnson – rhythm guitar, keyboards, co-lead vocals	none
July – August 2013	Jack Russell – lead vocals; Derrick Pontier – drums, percussion; Robby Lochner – lead guitar, backing vocals; Matthew Johnson – rhythm guitar, keyboards, co-lead vocals; Tony Montana – bass, backing vocals	none
August 2013 - November 2013	Jack Russell – lead vocals; Derrick Pontier – drums, percussion; Robby Lochner – lead guitar, backing vocals; Tony Montana – bass, backing vocals; Evan Haymond – rhythm guitar, keyboards, co-lead vocals	none
November 2013 – January 2016	Jack Russell – lead vocals; Robby Lochner – lead guitar, backing vocals; Tony Montana – rhythm guitar, keyboards, co-lead vocals; Dicki Fliszar – drums, percussion; Chris Tristram – bass, backing vocals	"Hard Habit" (2014)
January 2016 – early 2021; mid 2021-early 2022	Jack Russell – lead vocals; Robby Lochner – lead guitar, backing vocals; Tony Montana – rhythm guitar, keyboards, co-lead vocals; Dicki Fliszar – drums, percussion; Dan McNay – bass, backing vocals	He Saw It Comin' (2017); Once Bitten Acoustic Bytes (2020)
January 2021	Jack Russell – lead vocals; Robby Lochner – lead guitar, backing vocals; Dicki Fliszar – drums, percussion; Dan McNay – bass, backing vocals; Michael Olivieri – rhythm guitar, keyboards, co-lead vocals (touring guest)	Great Zeppelin II (2021)
January 2022 - March 2023	Jack Russell – lead vocals; Robby Lochner – lead guitar, backing vocals; Dan McNay – bass, backing vocals; Tony Montana – rhythm guitar, keyboards, co-lead vocals; Ken Mary – drums, percussion (touring guest)	none
March 2023 - July 2024	Jack Russell – lead vocals; Robby Lochner – lead guitar, backing vocals; Dan McNay – bass, backing vocals; Tony Montana – rhythm guitar, keyboards, co-lead vocals; Ken Mary – drums, percussion	none
late 2023	Jack Russell – lead vocals; Robby Lochner – lead guitar, backing vocals; Dan McNay – bass, backing vocals; Ken Mary – drums, percussion; Michael Olivieri – rhythm guitar, keyboards, co-lead vocals (touring guest)	none
