= Great White discography =

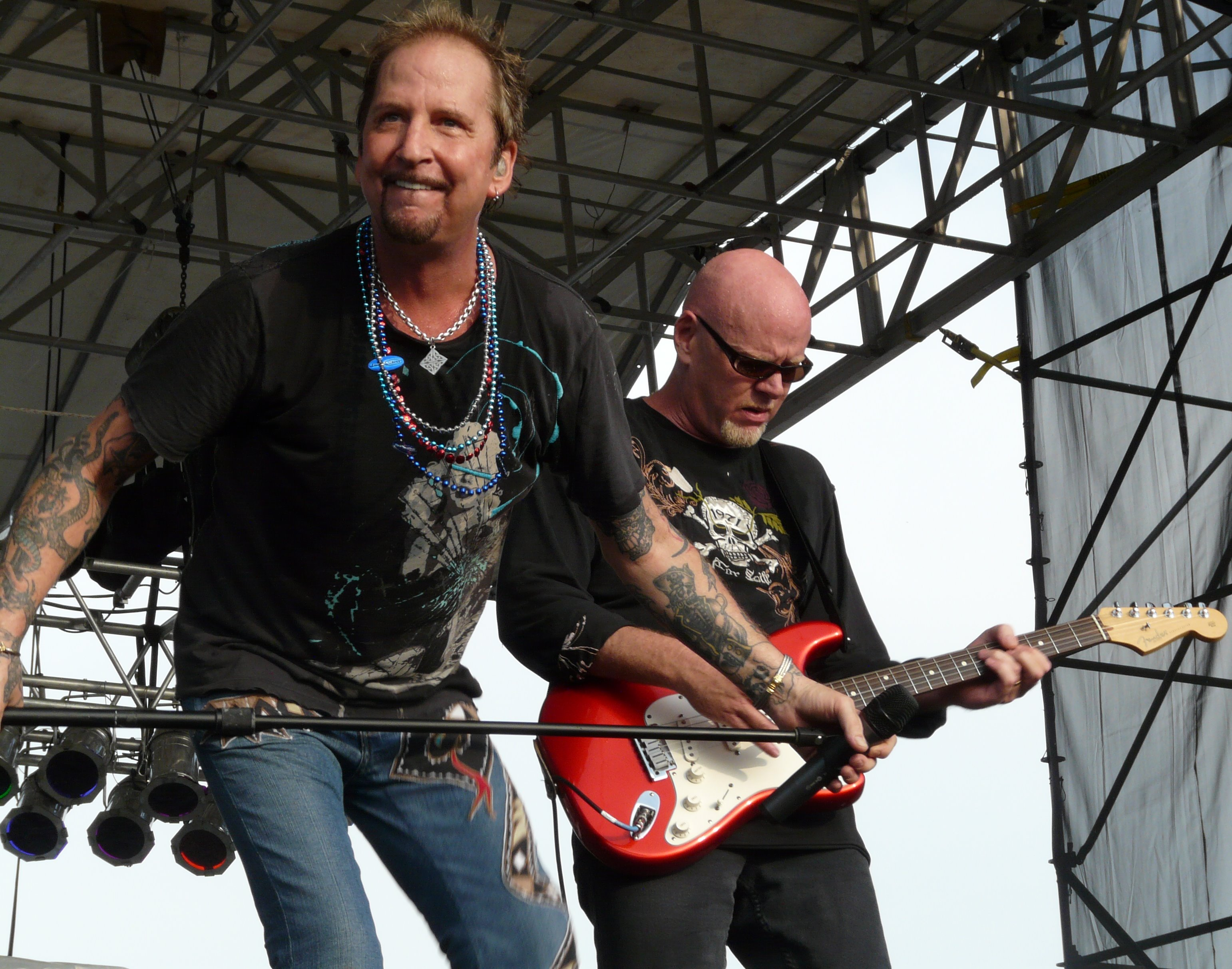
- Great White in 2008
- Studio albums: 13
- Extended plays: 4
- Live albums: 9
- Compilation albums: 14
- Tribute albums: 3
- Singles: 27
- Video albums: 1
- Music videos: 19

The discography of American rock band Great White includes nine albums that reached the Billboard 200 album chart and six singles on the magazine's Hot 100.

== Studio albums ==
Title	Album details	Peak chart positions					Certifications
Title	Album details	US	CAN	GER	SWI	UK	Certifications
Great White	Released: February 17, 1984; Label: EMI	144	—	—	—	—	
Shot in the Dark	Released: August 1986; Label: Capitol	82	—	—	—	—	
Once Bitten	Released: June 17, 1987; Label: Capitol	23	91	—	—	—	CAN: Gold; US: Platinum
...Twice Shy	Released: April 12, 1989; Label: Capitol	9	22	41	—	—	CAN: 2× Platinum; US: 2× Platinum
Hooked	Released: February 18, 1991; Label: Capitol	18	27	32	5	43	CAN: Gold; US: Gold
Psycho City	Released: September 14, 1992; Label: Capitol	107	—	—	22	—	
Sail Away	Released: May 10, 1994; Label: Zoo Entertainment	168	—	—	43	—	
Let It Rock	Released: May 21, 1996; Label: Imago	—	—	—	—	—	
Can't Get There from Here	Released: July 6, 1999; Label: Portrait	192	—	—	—	—	
Back to the Rhythm	Released: July 17, 2007; Label: Shrapnel	—	—	—	—	—	
Rising	Released: April 21, 2009; Label: Shrapnel	—	—	—	—	—	
Elation	Released: May 18, 2012; Label: Frontier	—	—	—	96	—	
Full Circle	Released: June 2, 2017; Label: Bluez Tone	—	—	—	—	—	
"—" denotes releases that did not chart or were not released in that territory.

== Live albums ==
- Recovery: Live! – 1988
- Live at the Ritz (promo only) – 1988
- Live at the Marquee – 1989
- Live in London – 1990
- Stage – 1995
- Thank You...Goodnight! – 2002
- Extended Versions – 2004
- Once Bitten, Twice Live – 2006
- 30 Years – Live from the Sunset Strip – 2013
- Live – 2020

== Tributes ==
- Great Zeppelin: A Tribute to Led Zeppelin – 1998
  - Great White Salutes Led Zeppelin – 2005
- Recover – 2002
  - The Final Cuts – 2002
  - Revisiting Familiar Waters – 2003

== Compilations ==
- Back Tracks 1986–1991 (promo only) – 1992
- The Best of Great White: 1986–1992 – 1993
- Rock Me – 1998
- Gallery – 1999
- The Best of Great White – 2000
- Latest & Greatest – 2000
- Rock Champions – 2000
- Greatest Hits – 2001
- A Double Dose – 2004 (combines Great Zeppelin and Recover)
- Rock Breakout Years: 1988 – 2005
- Rock Me: The Best of Great White – 2006
- Great White: The Essential Collection – 2009 (Deadline Music)
- Great White: Absolute Hits – 2011 (Capitol Records/EMI)
- Great White: Icon – 2013 (Capitol Records/Universal)

== Other appearances ==
- Hell Bent Forever: A Tribute to Judas Priest – 2008 (with the song "Diamonds & Rust")

== Extended plays ==
- Out of the Night – 1983
- On Your Knees – 1987
- The Blue EP – 1991

== Singles ==
Year	Song	US Hot 100	US Rock	UK	CAN	Certifications	Album
1984	"Stick It"	–	56	–	–		Great White
1984	"Substitute"	–	–	–	–		Great White
1984	"Streetkiller"	–	–	–	–		Great White
1986	"Face the Day"	–	–	97	–		Shot in the Dark
1986	"Waiting for Love"	–	–	–	–		Shot in the Dark
1986	"Run Away"	–	–	–	–		Shot in the Dark
1987	"Rock Me"	60	9	–	–		Once Bitten...
1987	"Save Your Love"	57	9	–	–		Once Bitten...
1987	"Lady Red Light"	–	47	–	–		Once Bitten...
1987	"Mistreater"	–	–	–	–		Once Bitten...
1989	"Mista Bone"	–	27	–	–		...Twice Shy
1989	"Once Bitten, Twice Shy"	5	6	83	11	US: Gold	...Twice Shy
1989	"The Angel Song"	30	18	–	–		...Twice Shy
1989	"Heart the Hunter"	–	–	91	–		...Twice Shy
1989	"House of Broken Love"	83	7	44	–		...Twice Shy
1991	"Congo Square"	–	–	62	–		Hooked
1991	"Call It Rock & Roll"	53	4	67	33		Hooked
1991	"Desert Moon"	–	16	–	–		Hooked
1992	"Big Goodbye"	–	20	–	–		Psycho City
1992	"Old Rose Motel"	–	23	–	–		Psycho City
1992	"Love Is a Lie"	–	–	–	–		Psycho City
1994	"Sail Away"	–	9	–	–		Sail Away
1994	"If I Ever Saw a Good Thing"	–	–	–	–		Sail Away
1996	"My World"	–	–	–	–		Let It Rock
1998	"In the Light" (live)	–	–	–	–		Great Zeppelin: A Tribute to Led Zeppelin
1999	"Rollin' Stoned"	–	8	–	11		Can't Get There from Here
1999	"Ain't No Shame"	–	–	–	–		Can't Get There from Here

== Videos ==
- My...My...My... – VHS 1991/DVD 2002

== Music videos ==
Year	Song	Director	Ref
1984	"Stick It"		
1984	"Substitute"		
1986	"Face the Day"	Doug Freel, Jean Pellerin	
1987	"Rock Me"	Nigel Dick	
1987	"Save Your Love"	Nigel Dick	
1987	"Lady Red Light"	Nigel Dick	
1989	"Mista Bone"	Nigel Dick	
1989	"Once Bitten, Twice Shy"	Nigel Dick	
1989	"The Angel Song"	Nigel Dick	
1990	"House of Broken Love"	Nigel Dick	
1991	"Call It Rock 'n' Roll"	Michael Bay	
1991	"Congo Square"	Michael Bay	
1991	"Desert Moon"	Wayne Isham	
1991	"Lovin' Kind"	Wayne Isham	
1992	"Big Goodbye"		
1993	"Love Is a Lie"		
1994	"Mother's Eyes"		
2012	"(I've Got) Something for You"		
2017	"Big Time"		
