= Thank You...Goodnight! =

Live album by Great White
- Released: November 19, 2002
- Recorded: Galaxy Theatre, Santa Ana, California, December 31, 2001
- Genre: Hard rock
- Length: 79:14
- Label: Knight Records
- Producer: Michael Lardie

Great White chronology
| Recover (2002) | Thank You...Goodnight! (2002) | A Double Dose (2004) |

Once Bitten, Twice Live album cover

Professional ratings
Review scores
| Source | Rating |
|---|---|
| AllMusic | 3.5/5 stars |

Thank You...Goodnight! is a live album released by the American hard rock band Great White in 2002. The album has the subtitle 'The Farewell Concert', because it contains the final performance of the band before its temporary disbandment, as announced by singer Jack Russell in November 2001. The concert was held at The Galaxy Theatre in Santa Ana, California, on December 31, 2001. This temporary break-up was short lived, as in late 2002, Russell and Kendall began to tour as "Jack Russell's Great White", which lasted until 2005. Two new songs, "Back to the Rhythm" and "Play On", were recorded on this album for the first time and reappeared in 2007 on the album Back to the Rhythm. This is the first and only release in any capacity to feature Derrick Pontier on drums.

The album was reissued in 2006 by Californian label Sidewinder Music under the name Once Bitten, Twice Live.

== Track listing ==
1. "Desert Moon" – 4:58
2. "Old Rose Motel" – 7:45
3. "Face the Day" – 6:12
4. "On Your Knees" – 4:57
5. "House of Broken Love" – 5:58
6. "Back to the Rhythm" – 4:34
7. "Save Your Love" – 5:05
8. "Play On" – 3:57
9. "Mista Bone" – 5:50
10. "Rock Me" – 7:45
11. "Call It Rock 'n' Roll" – 4:47
12. "Can't Shake It" – 9:33
13. "Once Bitten, Twice Shy" – 7:53

== Personnel ==
=== Band members ===
- Jack Russell – lead and backing vocals
- Mark Kendall – guitar, backing vocals
- Michael Lardie – guitar, keyboards, backing vocals, producer, mixing
- Sean McNabb – bass
- Derrick Pontier – drums

=== Production ===
- Tom Fletcher – live sound
- Kreg Black – engineer
