= Psycho City (disambiguation) =

Psycho City is a 1992 album by Great White, and its title song.

Psycho City may also refer to:

- "Psycho City", a 1993 song by Quiet Riot from Terrified
- Psycho City, TX, a virtual reality work by Robert J. Sexton
