= Burning House of Love =

Burning House of Love may refer to:

- Burning House of Love (album), the name of the 2004 Italian release of Recover by Great White
- "Burning House of Love" (song), by X from the 1985 album Ain't Love Grand
- "Burning House of Love" (True Blood), a 2008 television episode
