= Can't Get There from Here (disambiguation) =

"Cant Get There from Here" is a 1985 single by R.E.M.

Can't Get There from Here may also refer to:

- Can't Get There from Here (album), an album by Great White
- "Can't Get There from Here" (Bless the Harts), an episode of Bless the Harts
- You Can't Get There from Here, a poetry collection by Ogden Nash, illustrated by Maurice Sendak. Little Brown & Co, 1957
