= Latest & Greatest =

Compilation album by Great White
- Released: June 20, 2000
- Recorded: The Jandemonium, North Hollywood, April 1996
- Genre: Hard rock
- Length: 63:41
- Label: Portrait
- Producer: Michael Lardie, Jack Russell, Jack Blades

Great White chronology
The Best of Great White (2000)	Latest & Greatest (2000)	Rock Champions (2000)

Professional ratings
Review scores
Source	Rating
AllMusic	2/5 stars

Latest & Greatest is an album released by the American hard rock band Great White in 2000. It includes re-recordings of many of the bands' hits, with the exception of the live cover of Led Zeppelin's "In the Light", recorded on December 14, 1996, at the Galaxy Theatre in Santa Ana, California, and the October 2, 1999 live recording of "The Angel Song", taken at the House of Blues in Myrtle Beach, South Carolina and "Rollin' Stoned", presented in its original form.

== Track listing ==
1. "In the Light" (live) – 6:08
2. "Rock Me" – 7:08
3. "Face the Day" – 5:58
4. "Once Bitten, Twice Shy" – 5:24
5. "Rollin' Stoned" – 4:10
6. "Call It Rock n' Roll" – 4:13
7. "Save Your Love" – 4:41
8. "Can't Shake It" – 5:10
9. "House of Broken Love" – 5:57
10. "Mista Bone" – 5:07
11. "The Angel Song" (live) – 5:07
12. "Lady Red Light" – 4:38

== Personnel ==
- Jack Russell – lead vocals, percussion
- Mark Kendall – lead guitar, percussion, backing vocals
- Michael Lardie – rhythm guitar, keyboards, percussion, backing vocals
- Sean McNabb – bass
- Audie Desbrow – drums
