= Samantha 7 =

American rock band

- Also known as: The Stepmothers
- Genres: Pop punk, glam rock, alternative rock
- Years active: 1998–2004
- Label: Sony
- Past members: C.C. DeVille; Krys Baratto; Francis Ruiz; Ty Longley; Michael Lardie

Samantha 7 was an American rock band founded in 1998 by C.C. DeVille, lead guitarist from the rock band Poison. They released the self-titled album Samantha 7 in 2000 and C.C. DeVille performed lead vocals and guitar on the album. The band also included bassist Krys Baratto (who has worked as session musician with many artists and bands, from Thomas Dolby to Guns N' Roses), ex-Cynical Side drummer Francis Ruiz and for live dates Great White's guitarists Ty Longley and Michael Lardie. The band's tour manager Paul Woolnough also played drums in 2001 after drummer Francis Ruiz was run over by a car in Florida and Woolnough stepped in for the last shows of the tour.

== History ==
The band's original name was the Stepmothers, but the band was forced to change their name following a legal dispute with another band of the same name. Their debut gig was at the Woodstock 1999 festival. Bassist Krys Baratto had been offered the gig while DeVille was back out on the road with a Poison reunion tour. The bassist flew out to catch the tail end of the Poison tour to inform the guitarist of the news, leaving the fledgling band just two days to rehearse for the gig. Following the release of their debut album Samantha 7 in 2000 on John Kalodner's imprint label "Portrait Records" / Sony, the band completed a tour of the US and the UK.

From 2000 to 2001, bassist Krys Baratto and drummer Francis Ruiz also did double duties touring as members of Great White.

2004 saw C.C. DeVille back on the road with Poison, opening for a Kiss nationwide tour. That same year, Baratto worked with Modify in Minneapolis, Minnesota, and Samantha 7 was put on permanent hold after just one album. There have been various rumours about a second album, which to date have not materialized.

== Musical style ==
Samantha 7 was named after a giant female robot on the Japanese children's TV program 8 Man and the songs that C.C. Deville starting working on four years earlier were inspired by '70s AM radio hits as DeVille's heavy metal heritage.

== Discography ==
=== Studio albums ===
- Samantha 7 released in May, 2000

Signed by A&R guru John Kalodner to Columbia Records, the album was engineered by Andrew Murdock of Godsmack fame and produced by Jack Blades.

Track listing

1. "Framed"
2. "Hanging onto Jane"
3. "I Wanna Be Famous" (The Surreal Life Fame Games theme)
4. "Slave Laura"
5. "Cover Girl"
6. "Golden Days and Rain"
7. "Good Day"
8. "Bury Me"
9. "Bonnie Bradley"
10. "Seane Girl"
11. "Hollywood and Vine"

=== Singles ===
- "I Wanna Be Famous"

The Samantha 7 song "I Wanna Be Famous", released as a single for the album, was also used in the opening of the reality show The Surreal Life Fame Games, in which C.C. DeVille starred.

== C.C. Deville on lead vocals for Poison ==
Following the Samantha 7 album, C.C. DeVille performed lead vocals on the following Poison songs.

- "I Hate Every Bone in Your Body but Mine" - on Power to the People (2000)
- "Emperor's New Clothes" - on Hollyweird (2002)
- "Livin' in the Now" - on Hollyweird
- "Home" (CC's Story) - on Hollyweird

== Band members ==
- C.C. DeVille – lead vocals, lead guitar (1998–2004)
- Krys Baratto – bass (1998–2004)
- Francis Ruiz – drums, percussion (1998–2003)
- Ty Longley – rhythm guitar (2000–2003; his death)

=== Touring ===
- Michael Lardie – keyboards, rhythm guitar (2000–2003)
- Paul Woolnough - drums (tour manager, stood in for Francis Ruiz when he broke his leg) (2001)
