= Rock Champions (Great White album) =

Compilation album by Great White
- Released: November 9, 2000
- Genre: Hard rock
- Length: 71:32
- Label: EMI

Great White chronology
Latest & Greatest (2000)	Rock Champions (2000)	Greatest Hits (2001)

Professional ratings
Review scores
Source	Rating
AllMusic	3/5 stars

Rock Champions is a compilation album released by the American hard rock band Great White in 2000.

== Track listing ==
1. "Call It Rock n' Roll" – 3:58
2. "Once Bitten, Twice Shy" – 5:23
3. "Rock Me" – 7:14
4. "Move It" – 5:37
5. "Fast Road" – 3:42
6. "Can't Shake It" – 4:41
7. "Gonna Getcha" – 4:13
8. "Money (That's What I Want)" (Barrett Strong cover) – 3:05
9. "Red House" (Jimi Hendrix cover) – 8:48
10. "Afterglow (Of Your Love)" (Small Faces cover) – 5:45
11. "Desert Moon" – 4:34
12. "House of Broken Love" – 6:00
13. "Marliese" – 3:45
14. "Bitches and Other Women (medley): Bitch / It's Only Rock & Roll (But I Like It) / Women" – 4:47

Tracks 13 is listed as "Marliese", but is actually their cover of Led Zeppelin's "Rock 'N Roll" from Recovery: Live!
