= Stage (Great White album) =

Live album by Great White
- Released: 1995
- Recorded: 1993, 1994
- Venue: The Celebrity Theatre, Anaheim, California; House of Blues, Los Angeles
- Genre: Hard rock
- Length: 75:38
- Label: Zoo Entertainment
- Producer: Alan Niven, Michael Lardie

Great White chronology
Sail Away (1994)	Stage (1995)	Let It Rock (1996)

Extended Versions album cover

Professional ratings
Review scores
Source	Rating
AllMusic	2/5 stars

Stage is a live album by the American hard rock band Great White, released in 1995. It was put together by Alan Niven, Great White's former manager, as a contractual release for Zoo Entertainment. The first six tracks of the CD come from a 1994 House of Blues benefit concert (Stage One) and the other songs from a 1993 Anaheim show (Stage Two), several tracks of which were previously featured as a bonus on the studio album Sail Away. The initial Japanese pressing was a two-disc set, and featured one bonus track for each show.

The songs of this album, with the exception of "Maybe Someday" and "Congo Square", were re-issued in 2004 by BMG Special Products, with the title Extended Versions. This album was reissued again on both CD and Vinyl on February 21, 2020, by Deadline Music.

== Track listing ==
=== Stage one ===
1. "Train to Nowhere" – 4:43
2. "Sail Away" – 5:09
3. "House of Broken Love" – 6:31
4. "Maybe Someday" – 7:48
5. "Congo Square" – 7:24
6. "Afterglow" – 6:06

=== Stage two ===
7. "Face the Day" – 5:43
8. "Old Rose Motel" – 6:26
9. "Babe (I'm Gonna Leave You)" – 7:15
10. "Rock Me" – 7:29
11. "Can't Shake It" – 5:24
12. "Once Bitten, Twice Shy" – 5:40

=== Japanese edition bonus tracks ===
1. "Gone with the Wind"
2. "Love Is a Lie"

== Personnel ==
=== Band members ===
- Jack Russell – lead and backing vocals
- Mark Kendall – guitar, backing vocals
- Michael Lardie – guitar, keyboards, backing vocals, producer, mixing
- Teddy Cook – bass, backing vocals
- Audie Desbrow – drums

=== Production ===
- Alan Niven – producer, mixing
- Wyn Davis – engineer 1994 concert
- Biff Dawes, Doug Field, Philip Kneebone, Dennis Mays – engineers 1993 concert
