= Jack Russell (musician) =

American singer (1960–2024)

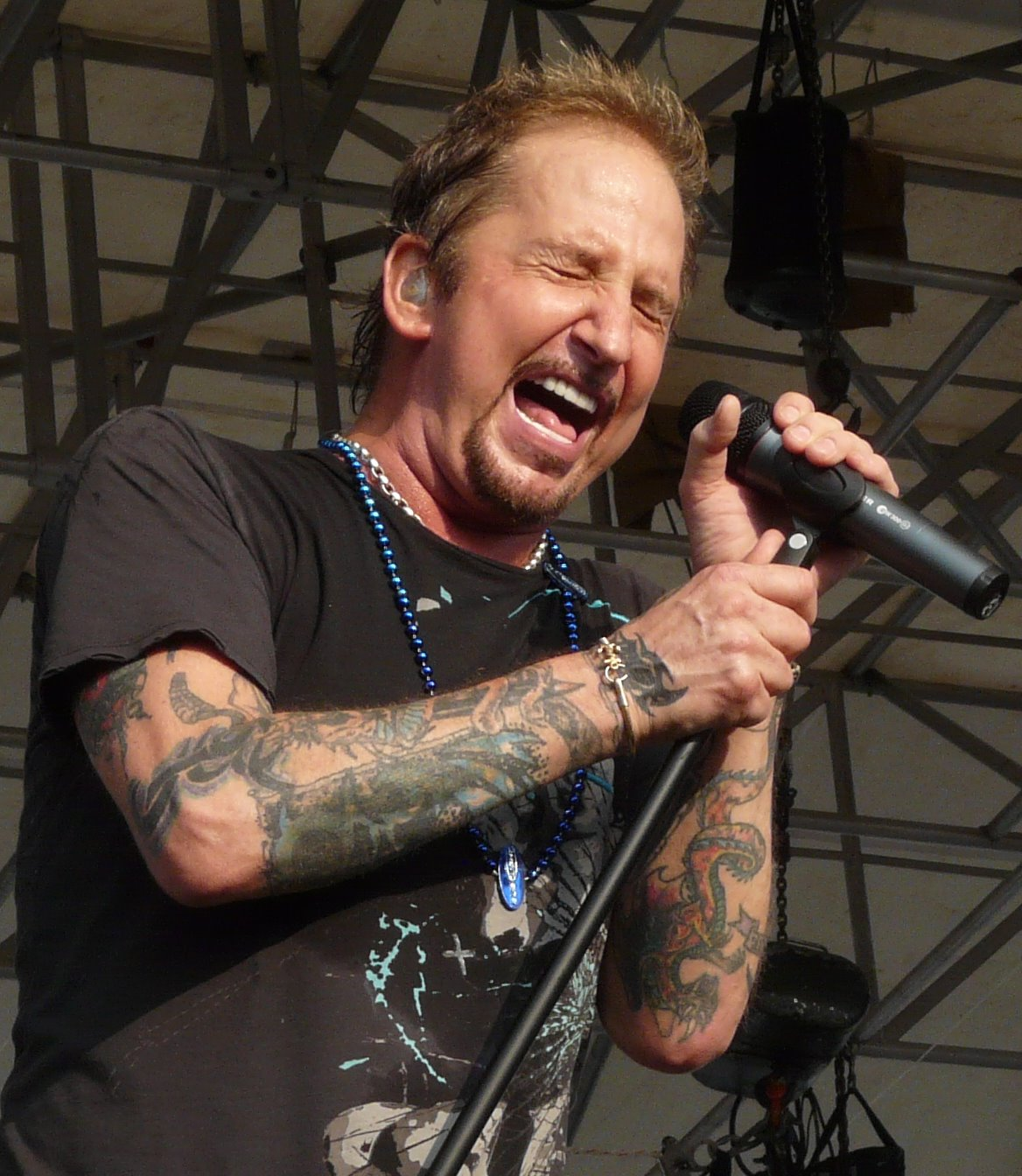
- Russell with Great White in 2008

Background information
- Born: Jack Patrick Russell; December 5, 1960; Montebello, California, U.S.
- Died: August 7, 2024 (aged 63) Littleton, Colorado, U.S.
- Genres: Hard rock; glam metal; heavy metal
- Occupations: Singer; songwriter
- Years active: 1980–2024
- Formerly of: Great White
- Spouse: Heather Ann Kramer (m. 2011)

Jack Patrick Russell (December 5, 1960 – August 7, 2024) was an American rock vocalist. He was a founding member of the hard rock band Great White.

Russell's vocals were noted for their power. Ultimate Classic Rock wrote: "While some glam metal vocalists prioritized grit and rasp, Great White's Jack Russell flaunted a voice that was buttery-smooth and could scale octaves with ease." He is considered by Ultimate Classic Rock magazine to be among the greatest hair metal singers of all time.

== Biography ==
=== Early life ===
Russell was born in Montebello, California, on December 5, 1960. He grew up with influences such as Robert Plant and Steven Tyler, and became a vocalist for many bands in high school and later on. He met Mark Kendall at a concert and began plans to form a band called Dante Fox, with Drummer, Lance Benedict and Bassist, Lorne Black. Band manager Alan Niven and Kendall decided to change the name of the band to Great White because "that was Mark Kendall's nickname. He had very white hair and very light complexion. They called him the Great White".

=== Great White, solo albums, and Jack Russell's Great White ===
Russell was with Great White from 1981 until 1996, then took some time off to record and release his first solo album, entitled Shelter Me, having rejoined shortly after its release until the band broke up in 2001. He then tried touring solo under his own name briefly, then changed the band name to "Jack Russell's Great White" and toured from 2002 to 2005, while also releasing his second solo album For You in 2002. On February 20, 2003, while touring as "Jack Russell's Great White", they played a club gig at The Station in West Warwick, Rhode Island, where a deadly fire caused by pyrotechnics occurred, leading to the deaths of 100 people including band member Ty Longley.

In 2006, he began touring with the official Great White band when they reformed with their classic lineup, but left the band in 2009 due to a fall in his bathroom where he cracked two vertebrae and herniated a disc. He had multiple back surgeries and was using several pain medications. Having fallen into alcoholism, the sudden death of his good friend Jani Lane of Warrant propelled him to get help and become sober.

Fully recovered, he started touring again as Jack Russell's Great White in December 2011 to avoid confusion with the still-touring official Great White band which had continued onward in 2009 with a different singer following Russell's departure.

In 2012, Russell guest-starred on VH1 Classics That Metal Show, on which he revealed his side of the Great White story, and how he was feeling well and ready for more.

In 2017, Jack Russell's Great White released their first album titled He Saw It Comin'.

In August 2021, Jack Russell's Great White released a sequel to Great White's 1998 tribute album to Led Zeppelin titled Great Zeppelin II: A Tribute to Led Zeppelin. In July 2021, a cover of "Whole Lotta Love" was released.

In January 2024, Russell released a collaboration album with L.A. Guns guitarist Tracii Guns, titled Medusa. This was Russell's final studio recording before his retirement and death.

== Personal life ==
In 1979, Russell was arrested for the attempted robbery of a drug dealer's home while high on PCP. He fired a shot into the house that accidentally struck and injured the housekeeper, who survived the incident. Russell was sentenced to eight years in prison, but was released after 11 months.

On March 25, 2011, he and his girlfriend Heather Ann Kramer were married.

=== Retirement and death ===
On July 17, 2024, Russell announced that he was retiring from touring and disclosed that he had Lewy body dementia (LBD).

Russell died less than a month after the announcement, on August 7, 2024, at the age of 63 at a friend's home in Colorado, from complications of LBD and multiple system atrophy. His death was announced on August 15.

== Discography ==
=== Albums ===
==== Jack Russell ====
- Shelter Me (1996)
- For You (2002)

==== Great White ====
- Out of the Night (1983)
- Great White (1984)
- Shot in the Dark (1986)
- On Your Knees (1987)
- Once Bitten (1987)
- Recovery: Live! (1988)
- Live at the Ritz (1988)
- ...Twice Shy (1989)
- Live at the Marquee (1989)
- Live in London (1990)
- Hooked (1991)
- The Blue EP (1991)
- Back Tracks 1986–1991 (1992)
- Psycho City (1992)
- The Best of Great White: 1986–1992 (1993)
- Sail Away (1994)
- Stage (1995)
- Let it Rock (1996)
- Rock Me (1998)
- Great Zeppelin: A Tribute to Led Zeppelin (1998)
- Gallery (1999)
- Can't Get There from Here (1999)
- The Best of Great White (2000)
- Latest & Greatest (2000)
- Rock Champions (2000)
- Greatest Hits (2001)
- Recover (2002)
- Thank You...Goodnight! (2002)
- The Final Cuts (2002)
- Revisiting Familiar Waters (2003)
- A Double Dose (2004)
- Extended Versions (2004)
- Burning House of Love / Love Removal Machine (2004)
- Great White Salutes Led Zeppelin (2005)
- Rock Breakout Years: 1988 (2005)
- Once Bitten, Twice Live (2006)
- Rock Me: The Best of Great White (2006)
- Back to the Rhythm (2007)
- Rising (2009)
- Great White: The Essential Collection (2009)
- Great White: Absolute Hits (2011)
- Great White: Icon (2013)

==== Jack Russell's Great White ====
- He Saw It Comin' (2017)
- Once Bitten Acoustic Bytes (2020)
- Great Zeppelin II: A Tribute to Led Zeppelin (2021)

==== Russell – Guns ====
- Medusa (2024)

=== Singles ===
- "Stick It" (with Great White) (1984)
- "Substitute" (with Great White) (1984)
- "Streetkiller" (with Great White) (1984)
- "Face the Day" (with Great White) (1986)
- "Waiting for Love" (with Great White) (1986)
- "Run Away" (with Great White) (1986)
- "Rock Me" (with Great White) (1987)
- "Save Your Love" (with Great White) (1987)
- "Lady Red Light" (with Great White) (1987)
- "Mistreater" (with Great White) (1987)
- "Mista Bone" (with Great White) (1989)
- "Once Bitten, Twice Shy" (with Great White) (1989)
- "The Angel Song" (with Great White) (1989)
- "Heart the Hunter" (with Great White) (1989)
- "House of Broken Love" (with Great White) (1989)
- "Call It Rock & Roll" (with Great White) (1991)
- "Congo Square" (with Great White) (1991)
- "Desert Moon" (with Great White) (1991)
- "Big Goodbye" (with Great White) (1992)
- "Old Rose Motel" (with Great White) (1992)
- "Love Is a Lie" (with Great White) (1992)
- "Sail Away" (with Great White) (1994)
- "If I Ever Saw a Good Thing" (with Great White) (1994)
- "My World" (with Great White) (1996)
- "In the Light (Live)" (with Great White) (1998)
- "Rollin' Stoned" (with Great White) (1999)
- "Ain't No Shame" (with Great White) (1999)
- "The Happy Song / Disco Cha Cha 2000" (2000)
- "Blame it on the Night" (with Jack Russell's Great White) (2016)
- "She Moves Me" Music Video (with Jack Russell's Great White) (2016)
- "Love Don't Live Here" (with Jack Russell's Great White) (2017)
- "Sign of the Times" (with Jack Russell's Great White) (2017)
- "Save Your Love" (with Jack Russell's Great White) (2020)
- "Born to be Wild" (with Robby Lochner) (2020)
- "Whole Lotta Love" (with Jack Russell's Great White) (2021)
- "Tell Me Why" (with Russell – Guns) (2023)
- "Next In Line" (with Russell – Guns) (2023)

=== Guest appearances ===
- "Analog Kid" (on Working Man with Michael Romeo, Michael Pinnella & Mike Portnoy) (1996)
- "Same Old Song and Dance" (on Tribute to Aerosmith: Not the Same Old Song and Dance with Jeff Baxter, Jeff Pilson, Edgar Winter & Bobby Blotzer) (1999)
- "Unchained" (on '80s Metal Tribute to Van Halen with Dweezil Zappa, Marco Mendoza & Eric Singer) (2006)
- "Kickstart My Heart" (on Crüe Believers – A Tribute to Mötley Crüe) (2008)
- "Dazed and Confused" (on Hair Metal in Covers Vol. 3 with Bruce Kulick, Tony Franklin & Doane Perry) (2009)
- "Blue Christmas" (on A Very Metal Christmas) (2011)
- "Junk Funk" (on Herman Ze German & Friends by Herman Ze German) (2012)
- "Messing Around" (on Herman Ze German & Friends by Herman Ze German) (2012)
- "Another One Bites the Dust" (on Music Inspired by Video Games) (2013)
- "Eat the Rich" (on Let the Tribute Do the Talkin' – Tribute to Aerosmith) (2014)
- "We Will Rock You" (on Stone Cold Queen – A Tribute with Bruce Kulick & Bob Kulick) (2014)
- "Junk Funk" (on Destiny by D.H. Cooper with Herman Rarebell) (2015)
- "Messing Around" (on Destiny by D.H. Cooper with Herman Rarebell) (2015)
- "Dust on a Grave" (on Dust on a Grave by Sweet Sienna with George Lynch, Joel Hoekstra, John Corabi, Keith St. John, Lorraine Lewis, Matt Starr, Richard Fortus & Sean McNabb) (2021)

== See also ==
- The Station nightclub fire – Jack Russell's Great White performance in West Warwick, Rhode Island where a fire broke out and 100 people died.
