= Rock Me: The Best of Great White =

Greatest hits album by Great White
- Released: June 6, 2006
- Genre: Hard rock
- Length: 53:54
- Label: Deadline/Cleopatra

Great White chronology
| A Double Dose (2004) | Rock Me: The Best of Great White (2006) | Back to the Rhythm (2007) |

Professional ratings
Review scores
| Source | Rating |
|---|---|
| AllMusic | 2.5/5 stars |

Rock Me: The Best of Great White is a compilation album released by the American hard rock band Great White in 2006.

== Track listing ==
1. "Rock Me" – 8:18
2. "Once Bitten, Twice Shy" – 5:16
3. "Save Your Love" – 4:38
4. "Love Removal Machine" – 4:30
5. "Again and Again" – 3:38
6. "Ready for Love" – 4:40
7. "Tangled Up in Blue" – 5:55
8. "Burning House of Love" – 3:51
9. "Ain't No Way to Treat a Lady" – 2:34
10. "Sin City" – 4:38
11. "No Matter What" – 2:44
12. "Lady Love" – 3:12
