= Can't Get There from Here (album) =

Studio album by Great White
- Released: 6 July 1999
- Recorded: 22 May 1998 – 14 Jun 1998
- Studios: 710 Studios, Redondo Beach and The Barn Studio, Santa Rosa, California
- Genre: Hard rock
- Length: 51:45
- Label: Portrait
- Producer: Jack Blades

Great White chronology
| Gallery (1999) | Can't Get There from Here (1999) | The Best of Great White (2000) |

Singles from Can't Get There from Here
- 1. "Rollin' Stoned" Released: 1999; 2. "Ain't No Shame" Released: 1999

Professional ratings
Review scores
| Source | Rating |
|---|---|
| Collector's Guide to Heavy Metal | 5/10 |

Can't Get There from Here is the ninth studio album by the American hard rock band Great White, released in 1999. The track "Rollin' Stoned" was released as a promo single and received airplay on mainstream rock radio.

== Track listing ==
1. "Rollin' Stoned" (Michael Lardie, Jack Russell, Jack Blades) - 4:08
2. "Ain't No Shame" (Lardie, Russell, Don Dokken, Blades) - 4:19
3. "Silent Night" (Russell, Lardie, Blades) - 4:49
4. "Saint Lorraine" (Russell, Lardie, Blades) - 4:04
5. "In the Tradition" (Gary Burr, Blades) - 2:59
6. "Freedom Song" (Mark Kendall, Russell, Lardie) - 4:36
7. "Gone to the Dogs" (Russell, Kendall, Lardie, Dokken) - 2:42
8. "Wooden Jesus" (Lardie, Russell, Dokken) - 4:23
9. "Sister Mary" (Lardie, Alan Niven) - 4:54
10. "Loveless Age" (Russell, Lardie, Blades) - 5:22
11. "Psychedelic Hurricane" (Russell, Todd Griffin, Tim Henley) - 4:15
12. "Hey Mister" (Russell, Lardie) - 5:07
13. "The Good Die Young" (Jeff Pilson, Dokken) - 5:12 (bonus track on Japanese version)

== Personnel ==
=== Band members ===
- Jack Russell - lead and backing vocals, percussion
- Mark Kendall - guitar, percussion, backing vocals
- Michael Lardie - guitar, keyboards, percussion, backing vocals, engineer
- Sean McNabb - bass
- Audie Desbrow - drums

=== Production ===
- Jack Blades – producer, backing vocals
- Don Dokken – producer on "Psychedelic Hurricane"
- Rob Easterday, Ken Koroshetz – assistant engineers
- Noel Golden – mixing
- David Donnelly – mastering
- Hooshik – art direction
- Stephen Stickler – photography
- Jim Warren – cover art

== Charts ==
| Chart (1999) | Peak position |
|---|---|
| US Billboard 200 | 192 |
