= Christine Devine =

American television news anchor

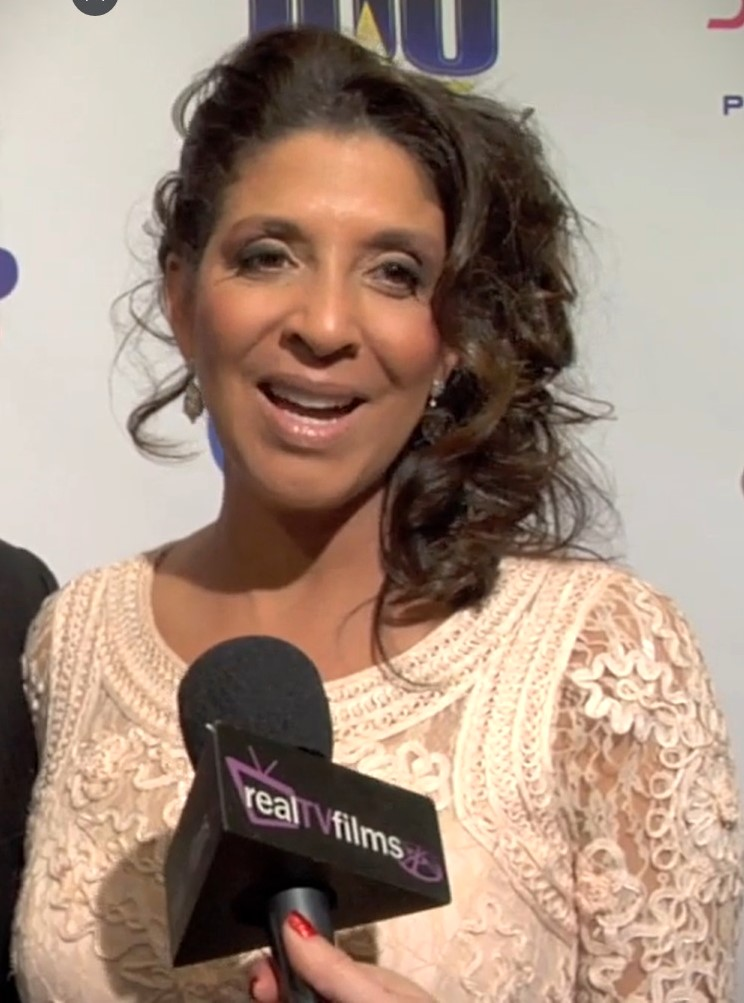
- Devine in 2015
- Born: November 2, 1965 (age 60); Hamburg, New York, U.S.
- Education: Arizona State University
- Occupation: News anchor
- Years active: 1987-present
- Employer(s): KLST; KVOA-TV; KTTV 1990-present
- Spouse: Sean McNabb
- Parent(s): Karen and Jack Devine
- Awards: 16 Emmy Awards, Associated Press Award
- Website: www.christinedevine.com

Christine Devine (born November 2, 1965) is an American television news anchor based in Los Angeles. She can be seen weeknights on KTTV's Fox 11 News. She has won 16 Emmys, including the prestigious Governors Award. Six Emmys were for Best Newscast.

== Early life and education ==
Devine was born in Hamburg, New York, and grew up in Arizona. She graduated from Arizona State University in 1987 and began her career as a reporter in her home state before joining KTTV. She is in the Walter Cronkite School of Broadcast Journalism's Hall of Fame, and received ASU's Founders Day Alumni Achievement award. She attended on the Leadership Scholarship. She is currently on the Alumni Association board. In 2021 she received an honorary doctorate at Cal State LA Commencement.

Devine attended Tolleson Union High School in Tolleson, Arizona. She was Valedictorian and was voted "Most Likely to Succeed."

She is of Brazilian and European American ancestry. Her mother married Jack Devine. He legally adopted her and she changed her name to Christine Devine.

== Career ==
Devine is known for her "Wednesday's Child" adoption segment. Since 1994 she has profiled foster children looking for adoptive homes, resulting in more than 500 adoptions. In 2009, she was honored in Washington, D.C., with a congressional award. She wrote a book on "Wednesday's Child": Finding a Forever Family, A News Anchor's Notebook.

Devine has received the Congressional Coalition's Angels in Adoption award, two Gracie Allen Awards from AWRT (American Women in Radio & Television), the Society of Professional Journalists' Anna Quindlen Award for Community Service, Volunteers of America' Media Volunteer of the Year (LA) award, Child Welfare League of America award and Career Achievement from the Chamber of Commerce. She is in the Arizona State University Alumni Hall of Fame. She has been honored by the LAPD, LA County Board of Supervisors, LA City, and LA County Sheriff's Department.

Devine was a co-chair of The Good News Foundation, a non-profit founded by five LA news anchors/reporters wanting to honor the "good" in Los Angeles GNF helped build a computer lab for homeless children, and a showroom for low-income women to receive free career clothing. It sponsors an apartment at the Downtown Women's Center for homeless women, and a journalism scholarship.

On November 20, 2015, Devine was celebrated at Fox News, having worked there for 25 years.

She has appeared as a reporter in a number of movies and TV series, including 24, Prison Break, Melrose Place, 90210, The Cable Guy, Wag the Dog, Most Wanted, Independence Day.

== Personal life ==
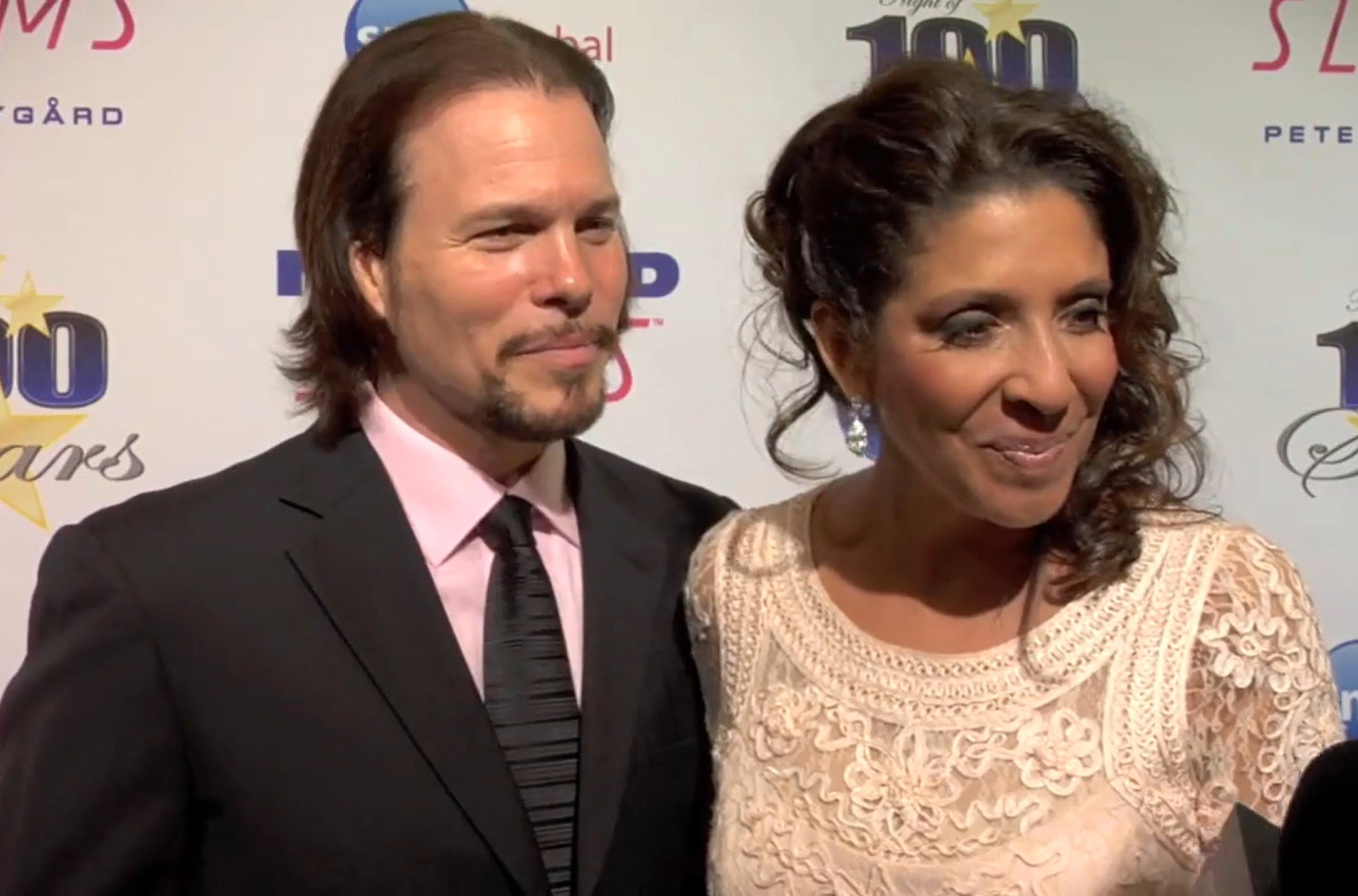
Sean McNabb and Devine at Night of 100 Stars 2015

Christine married musician–actor Sean McNabb on September 9, 2016. Both Christine and Sean are active in the community doing charity Harley rides, golf tournaments and public speaking.
