= The Best of Great White =

Greatest hits album by Great White
- Released: April 11, 2000
- Genre: Hard rock
- Length: 56:07
- Label: EMI / Capitol

Great White chronology
Can't Get There from Here (1999)	The Best of Great White (2000)	Latest & Greatest (2000)

Rock Breakout Years: 1988 album cover

Professional ratings
Review scores
Source	Rating
AllMusic	3/5 stars
AllMusic	3/5 stars

The Best of Great White is a compilation album released by the American hard rock band Great White in 2000. The album was re-issued in 2005 by EMI subsidiary Madacy Records with the title Rock Breakout Years: 1988.

== Track listing ==
1. "Rock Me" – 7:16 (from the album Once Bitten)
2. "House of Broken Love" – 5:59 (from the album ...Twice Shy)
3. "Stick It" – 3:58 (from the album Great White)
4. "Call It Rock n' Roll" – 3:57 (from the album Hooked)
5. "Once Bitten, Twice Shy" – 5:22 (from the album ...Twice Shy)
6. "Face the Day" – 7:02 (from the album Shot in the Dark)
7. "The Angel Song" – 4:52 (from the album ...Twice Shy)
8. "Save Your Love" – 4:31 (from the album Once Bitten)
9. "Babe I'm Gonna Leave You" (live) – 7:14 (recorded live on MTV Unplugged, June 5, 1990)
10. "Big Goodbye" – 5:56 (from the album Psycho City)
