= Elation (album) =

Studio album by Great White
- Released: May 18, 2012
- Recorded: Vivid Tone Studios, Rancho Cucamonga, California
- Genre: Hard rock
- Length: 60:52
- Label: Frontiers
- Producer: Michael Lardie, Mark Kendall

Great White chronology
Rising (2009)	Elation (2012)	Full Circle (2017)

Elation is the twelfth studio album by the American hard rock band Great White, released in May 2012. It is the first Great White studio album to feature vocalist Terry Ilous. Additionally, it is the first one without original vocalist Jack Russell.

The album was announced on March 18, 2012, for a release on May 18 in Europe and May 22 in North America on Frontiers Records and also in Japan. Elation was produced, recorded and mixed by Michael Lardie and Mark Kendall, the band's two guitarists. The album was later remixed by George Tutko and made available as MP3s on Amazon and MP4s on iTunes.

== Reception ==
Professional ratings
Review scores
Source	Rating
Classic Rock	7/10 stars

Since its release, the album has been met with mixed to positive responses. Jon Hotten reviewed the album positively for Classic Rock magazine, writing that "it shows some of the qualities that took (Great White) in their substantial heyday", when the band "made hard rockin' sound easy". He praises Ilous' "rasping-throat role" and concludes that, despite the lack of killer hooks "of the kind that Great White had in abundance" the band still shows its musicianship. William Clark of Guitar International wrote: "Those memorable blues rock riffs that scatter Great White's biggest hits are in excess with Elation." Sleaze Roxx gave a mixed review, saying "With Mark Kendall on guitar you really can't go wrong, but without his longtime partner Jack Russell, Elation isn't all it could be".

== Track listing ==
All songs written by Great White

1. "(I've Got) Something for You" – 4:31
2. "Feelin' So Much Better" – 5:04
3. "Love Train" – 4:46
4. "Heart of a Man" – 4:27
5. "Hard to Say Goodbye" – 5:18
6. "Resolution" – 5:06
7. "Shotgun Willie's" – 5:07
8. "Promise Land" – 5:45
9. "Lowdown" – 5:56 (bonus track)
10. "Just for Tonight" – 4:33
11. "Love Is Enough" – 6:04
12. "Complicated" – 4:15

== Personnel ==
The album was recorded by the Terry Ilous-fronted Great White; original lead vocalist Jack Russell fronts another band, dubbed Jack Russell's Great White.

- Terry Ilous – lead vocals
- Mark Kendall – lead guitar
- Michael Lardie – guitar, keyboards
- Scott Snyder – bass
- Audie Desbrow – drums

== Charts ==
Chart (2012)	Peak position
Belgian Albums (Ultratop Wallonia)	186
Swiss Albums (Schweizer Hitparade)	96
