= Recover (Great White album) =

Studio album by Great White
- Released: February 5, 2002
- Recorded: Total Access Recording, Redondo Beach, California, November 1989
- Genre: Hard rock
- Length: 47:57
- Label: Deadline/Cleopatra
- Producer: Great White

Great White chronology
Greatest Hits (2001)	Recover (2002)	Thank You...Goodnight! (2002)

The Final Cuts album cover

Revisiting Familiar Waters album cover

Professional ratings
Review scores
Source	Rating
AllMusic	2/5 stars
AllMusic	3/5 stars

Recover is a cover album released by the American hard rock band Great White in 2002. All of the tracks are covers of songs that the band gained the most influence from. The album was recorded live in studio in November 1989 as a two-track demo. The collection of covers of this album include songs already appeared in other Great White albums, such as the medley "Bitches and Other Women" on ...Twice Shy, "Down at the Doctors" on Hooked and "Ain't No Way to Treat a Lady" on Let It Rock. The covers of "Ready for Love" and "Fire and Water" are notable, as both were made famous by bands with Paul Rodgers as the lead singer. The former song was originally recorded by Mott the Hoople, whose guitarist Mick Ralphs was later in Bad Company and whose lead singer Ian Hunter originally performed "Once Bitten, Twice Shy", a major hit for Great White in 1989. The Dr. Feelgood song "Down at the Doctors" is misspelled in the credits as "Down to the Doctor".

Recover was issued with an altered order of the songs by the label Axe Killer in France in 2002, under the name The Final Cuts and in 2003 by Mausoleum Records with two bonus tracks, under the name Revisiting Familiar Waters.

In 2004, the Italian label Horizon-Italy re-issued the album with the title Burning House of Love, without the band's permission. The compilation's title was considered to be in very bad taste, given that it was released just a year after The Station nightclub fire at a 2003 Great White concert. The band has since condemned the label for illegally making this album, and has urged all fans not to buy it. The Italian label, on the other end, promptly changed the title to Love Removal Machine, without changing cover or content of the CD.

Deadline Records issued a double-CD deluxe edition of Recover in 2007, with a bonus CD containing tracks taken from other Great White albums and from tribute albums where Jack Russell had sung.

== Track listings ==
No.	Title	Writer(s)	Original	Length
1.	"Love Removal Machine"	Ian Astbury, Billy Duffy	The Cult	4:30
2.	"Again and Again"	Rick Parfitt, Andy Bown, Jackie Lynton	Status Quo	3:39
3.	"Ready for Love"	Mick Ralphs	Mott the Hoople	4:41
4.	"Bitches and Other Women" (medley of "Bitch", "It's Only Rock 'n Roll", and "Women")	Mick Jagger, Keith Richards, Mick Jones	The Rolling Stones, Foreigner	4:50
5.	"Tangled Up in Blue"	Bob Dylan	Bob Dylan	5:56
6.	"Burning House of Love"	Exene Cervenka, John Doe	X	3:53
7.	"Ain't No Way to Treat a Lady"	Floyd D. Rose, Jonathan Scott Palmerston	Q5	2:35
8.	"Sin City"	Angus Young, Malcolm Young, Bon Scott	AC/DC	4:40
9.	"No Matter What"	Pete Ham	Badfinger	2:46
10.	"Fire and Water"	Andy Fraser, Paul Rodgers	Free	3:37
11.	"Down to the Doctor"	Mickey Jupp	Dr. Feelgood	3:38
12.	"Lady Love"	James Dewar, Robin Trower	Robin Trower	3:12
13.	"Unchained (KMFDM remix)"	Edward Van Halen, Alex Van Halen, Michael Anthony, David Lee Roth	Van Halen	4:07
14.	"Sin City (Rosetta Stone remix)"	Angus Young, Malcolm Young, Bon Scott	AC/DC	4:34

2007 bonus CD
No.	Title	Writer(s)	Original	Length
1.	"Once Bitten, Twice Shy"	Ian Hunter	Ian Hunter	5:15
2.	"Rock Me"	Mark Kendall, Michael Lardie, Alan Niven, Jack Russell	Great White	8:17
3.	"Save Your Love"	Jerry Lynn Williams, Russell	Great White	4:37
4.	"Saturday Night Special"	Ed King, Ronnie Van Zant	Lynyrd Skynyrd	4:21
5.	"Same Old Song and Dance"	Joe Perry, Steven Tyler	Aerosmith	4:08
6.	"Unchained"	E. Van Halen, A. Van Halen, Anthony, Roth	Van Halen	3:22
7.	"Any Way You Want It"	Steve Perry, Neal Schon	Journey	3:07
8.	"D'yer Mak'er (Live)"	John Bonham, John Paul Jones, Jimmy Page, Robert Plant	Led Zeppelin	4:44
9.	"All My Love (Live)"	Page, Plant	Led Zeppelin	6:12
10.	"Immigrant Song (Live)"	Page, Plant	Led Zeppelin	2:21
11.	"When the Levee Breaks (Live)"	Bonham, Jones, Memphis Minnie, Page, Plant	Led Zeppelin	6:51
12.	"The Rover (Live)"	Page, Plant	Led Zeppelin	6:00
13.	"Stairway to Heaven (Live)"	Page, Plant	Led Zeppelin	8:36

Burning House of Love bonus tracks
No.	Title	Writer(s)	Original	Length
1.	"Train to Nowhere"	Kim Simmonds, Chris Youlden	Savoy Brown	4:27
2.	"The Hunter"	Carl Wells, Donald "Duck" Dunn, Steve Cropper, Al Jackson, Jr., Booker T. Jones	Albert King	4:12
3.	"Once Bitten, Twice Shy"	Hunter	Ian Hunter	5:22

== Personnel ==
=== Band members ===
- Jack Russell – lead and backing vocals
- Mark Kendall – lead guitar, backing vocals
- Michael Lardie – rhythm guitar, keyboards, backing vocals, engineer
- Tony Montana – bass
- Audie Desbrow – drums

=== Production ===
- Melissa Sewell – assistant engineer
