= Let It Rock (Great White album) =

Studio album by Great White
- Released: May 21, 1996
- Recorded: October 1995
- Studios: 710 Studios & Total Access Recording, Redondo Beach, California
- Genre: Hard rock
- Length: 54:25
- Label: Imago
- Producers: Michael Lardie, Jack Russell, Dito Godwin

Great White chronology
Stage (1995)	Let It Rock (1996)	Rock Me (1997)

Singles from Let It Rock
- 1. "My World" Released: 1996

Professional ratings
Review scores
Source	Rating
AllMusic	2.5/5 stars
Collector's Guide to Heavy Metal	5/10
Rock Hard	8/10

Let it Rock is the eighth studio album by the American hard rock band Great White, released in 1996. It was recorded after their split with long-time manager and co-writer Alan Niven. After the acoustic sound of 1994's Sail Away, the band was determined to return to their hard rock roots.

== Track listing ==
1. "My World" (Don Dokken, Matthew Johnson, Mark Kendall, Michael Lardie, Jack Russell) – 5:28
2. "Lil Mama" (Kendall, Lardie, Russell, Dave Spitz) – 4:27
3. "Where is the Love" (Lardie, Russell) – 4:22
4. "Hand on the Trigger" (Lardie, Russell) – 5:17
5. "Easy" (Kendall, Lardie, Russell) – 4:26
6. "Pain Overload" (Audie Desbrow, Kendall, Lardie, Russell) – 4:41
7. "Lives in Chains" (Kendall, Lardie, Russell, Spitz) – 6:20
8. "Anyway I Can" (Teddy Cook, Desbrow, Kendall, Lardie, Russell) – 6:07
9. "Man in the Sky" (Todd Griffin, Russell) – 4:38
10. "Ain't No Way to Treat a Lady" (Floyd D. Rose, Scott Palmerton) – 2:45
11. "Miles Away" (Kendall, Lardie, Russell) – 5:32

== Japanese edition track listing ==
1. "Lil Mama" – 4:27
2. "Ain't No Way to Treat a Lady" – 2:45
3. "My World" – 5:28
4. "Pain Overload" – 4:41
5. "Easy" – 4:26
6. "Lives in Chains" – 6:20
7. "Man in the Sky" – 4:38
8. "Hand on the Trigger" – 5:17
9. "Where Is the Love" – 4:22
10. "Anyway I Can" – 6:07
11. "Burnin' House of Love" – 3:52 (bonus track)
12. "Miles Away" – 5:32

== Personnel ==
=== Great White ===
- Jack Russell – lead and backing vocals, producer
- Mark Kendall – guitars, backing vocals
- Michael Lardie – guitars, keyboards, banjo, flute, backing vocals, producer, engineer
- Audie Desbrow – drums

=== Additional musicians ===
- Dave Spitz – bass
- Cody McDonald – harmonica
- Steffen Pressley – alto sax
- Alicia Previn a.k.a. Lovely Previn – violin
- Don Teschner – viola
- Martin Tillman – cello

=== Production ===
- Dito Godwin – producer
- Ulysses Noriega, Darian Rundall, Stacey Hanlon – assistant engineers
- Steve Hall – mastering
