= Desert Moon (Great White song) =

Single by Great White

from the album Hooked
- Released: 1991
- Studio: Total Access Recording
- Genre: Glam metal
- Length: 4:31
- Label: Capitol
- Songwriters: Mark Kendall, Jack Russell, Alan Niven, Michael Lardie
- Producers: Alan Niven, Mark Kendall and Michael Lardie

"Desert Moon" is a single released by the American rock band Great White in 1991. It is the ninth track off of their album Hooked. Desert Moon peaked at 16 on the US Mainstream Rock chart in 1991.

During a videotaped performance of this song in 2003, indoor pyrotechnics created a fire at the Station nightclub, which resulted in 100 deaths.

== The Station nightclub fire ==
On February 20, 2003, at 11:00 PM, the band (touring as the name Jack Russell's Great White) began a performance of "Desert Moon". As the song began, illegal indoor pyrotechnics were set off by the band's manager, Dan Biechele. Within seconds, the polyurethane foam in the drummer's alcove was ignited by the sparks. The fire grew, and within minutes, the entire club was engulfed in flames. 100 people died as a result, including guitarist Ty Longley who had joined the band for the tour.

"Desert Moon" was temporarily removed from tour setlists in the aftermath of the fire. However, following Great White's full reformation in 2006, "Desert Moon" was added back into the common set lists by July 2007.

== Charts ==
Chart (1991)	Peak position
US Mainstream Rock (Billboard)	16
