= Rising (Great White album) =

Studio album by Great White
- Released: March 13, 2009 (Europe); April 21, 2009 (USA)
- Recorded: December 2008 – January 2009
- Studio: Desbrowland Studio, Inland Empire, California
- Genre: Hard rock
- Length: 54:54
- Label: Frontiers (Europe); Shrapnel (USA)
- Producer: Michael Lardie

Great White chronology
Back to the Rhythm (2007)	Rising (2009)	Elation (2012)

Professional ratings
Review scores
Source	Rating
AllMusic	2/5 stars

Rising is the eleventh studio album by the American hard rock band Great White, released in 2009. It was recorded in the winter of 2008 with completion in early 2009. Rising was mixed, produced, and engineered by Michael Lardie with all members of the group contributing to the final mix. This is the final album with long-time singer Jack Russell before the split that led to the creation of his own-fronted version of the band.

== Track listing ==
1. "Situation" (Mark Kendall, Michael Lardie, Jack Russell) – 5:00
2. "All or Nothin'" (Kendall, Lardie, Russell) – 5:19
3. "I Don't Mind" (Lardie, Russell) – 5:19
4. "Shine" (Kendall, Russell) – 5:54
5. "Loveless" (Lardie, Russell) – 5:39
6. "Is It Enough" (Kendall, Lardie, Russell) – 4:14
7. "Last Chance" (Kendall, Lardie, Russell) – 4:11
8. "Danger Zone" (Kendall, Russell) – 4:37
9. "Down on the Level" (Audie Desbrow, Kendall, Lardie, Russell) – 4:03
10. "Only You Can Do" (Kendall, Lardie, Russell) – 5:02
11. "My Sanctuary" (Kendall, Russell) – 5:36

=== Bonus tracks ===
The European and Japanese releases add a Rolling Stones cover as track 12.

- "Let's Spend the Night Together" (Jagger/Richards) (European release only)
- "Can't You Hear Me Knocking" (Jagger/Richards) (Japanese release only)

== Personnel ==
- Jack Russell – lead and backing vocals
- Mark Kendall – guitar, backing vocals
- Michael Lardie – guitar, keyboards, mandolin, sitar, harmonica, percussion, backing vocals, producer, engineer
- Scott Snyder – bass, backing vocals
- Audie Desbrow – drums
