= Recovery: Live! =

Live album by Great White
- Released: 1988
- Genre: Hard rock
- Label: Enigma
- Producer: Alan Niven

Great White chronology
Once Bitten (1987)	Recovery: Live! (1988)	...Twice Shy (1989)

CD cover

Professional ratings
Review scores
Source	Rating
AllMusic	2/5 stars
Collector's Guide to Heavy Metal	6/10

Recovery: Live! is a live album released by the American hard rock band Great White originally in 1988. Several versions of the album were released, with variations in both covers and track listings. The US version features five cover songs recorded direct-to-2-track in 1986, as well as five live songs from 1983. The CD release added the songs from the EP On Your Knees (re-issue of the original Out of the Night EP) as a bonus, though another version of the CD exists that lists the EP, but does not actually contain it. It only contains the ten songs found on the original vinyl LP, and has a different mastering than the 15-track disc. The ten track CD variation is the Columbia Record Club edition. The European release replaces tracks 6–10 with five songs from a 1987 Marquee show (the same show as disc two of the ...Twice Shy limited edition). The Japanese version is a different and includes five tracks from the US version, two tracks from the Live at the Ritz promo CD, and five studio tracks from the Shot in the Dark and Once Bitten albums.

== Contemporary reviews ==
Writing for the June 1988 issue of Circus magazine, music critic Paul Gallotta met the release with strong critical praise. Great White was commended for their authoritative interpretations of classic rock tracks, with the reviewer describing the band as "stomping their way" through the material. Specifically, Gallotta singled out the cover versions of Led Zeppelin's "Immigrant Song" and "Rock and Roll", as well as The Who's "Substitute", characterizing them as "killers." Furthermore, Gallotta argued that the compilation served as an ideal acquisition for newer listeners who had discovered the formation through their previous platinum-certified studio work, Once Bitten (1987). He concluded that those fans should pick up Recovery: Live! "without missing a beat."

== Track listing (US version) ==
1. "Immigrant Song"
2. "Rock 'N Roll"
3. "Money (That's What I Want)"
4. "Red House"
5. "I Don't Need No Doctor"
6. "Hard and Cold"
7. "Substitute"
8. "Streetkiller"
9. "Bad Boys"
10. "Stick It"

== Track listing (UK/European version) ==
1. "Immigrant Song"
2. "Rock 'N Roll"
3. "Money (That's What I Want)"
4. "Red House"
5. "I Don't Need No Doctor"
6. "Shot in the Dark"
7. "What Do You Do"
8. "Gonna Getcha"
9. "Money (That's What I Want)"
10. "All Over Now"

== Track listing (Japan version) ==
1. "Hard and Cold (US version)"
2. "Substitute (US version)"
3. "Streetkiller (US version)"
4. "Money (That's What I Want) (US/UK version)"
5. "Red House (US/UK version)"
6. "Shot in the Dark (studio)"
7. "Gonna Getcha (studio)"
8. "Run Away (studio)"
9. "Since I've Been Loving You (from "Live At The Ritz" promo CD)"
10. "Face the Day (Extended Version) (from "Live At The Ritz" promo CD)"
11. "All Over Now (studio)"
12. "Rock Me (studio)"

== Personnel ==
- Jack Russell: lead vocals
- Mark Kendall: guitar, lead vocal on Red House
- Lorne Black: bass
- Audie Desbrow: drums
- Gary Holland: drums (1983 show)

== Special guest ==
- Michael Thompson: guitar on Red House

== Charts ==
Chart (1988)	Peak position
US Billboard 200	99
