= Sail Away (Great White album) =

Studio album by Great White
- Released: May 10, 1994
- Recorded: February 1994
- Studio: Total Access (Redondo Beach, California)
- Length: 42:38
- Label: Zoo Entertainment
- Producers: Alan Niven, Michael Lardie

Great White chronology
The Best of Great White: 1986–1992 (1993)	Sail Away (1994)	Stage (1995)

Singles from Sail Away
- 1. "Sail Away" Released: 1994; 2. "All Right" Released: 1994; 3. "If I Ever Saw A Good Thing" Released: 1994

Professional ratings
Review scores
Source	Rating
AllMusic	3/5 stars
Collector's Guide to Heavy Metal	4/10

Sail Away is the seventh studio album by American hard rock band Great White, released in 1994. It was a much mellower effort, dominated by acoustic guitars and laid back performances. Clarence Clemons of the E Street Band plays the sax solo on "Gone with the Wind". This is the band's first and only recording with bassist Teddy Cook, as well as their first release for Zoo Entertainment. The original issue came with a bonus CD entitled Anaheim Live. Though these CD's state that the bonus disc was part of a limited edition pressing, no other pressings on CD were made without Anaheim Live, likely because of the poor sales of the album.

== Track listing ==
No.	Title	Writer(s)	Length
1.	"A Short Overture"	Mark Kendall, Michael Lardie, Tony Montana, Alan Niven, Jack Russell	0:37
2.	"Mother's Eyes"	Teddy Cook, Niven, Russell	3:34
3.	"Cryin'"	Kendall, Lardie, Niven, Russell	4:39
4.	"Momma Don't Stop"	Cook, Lardie, Niven	3:46
5.	"Alone"	Kendall, Lardie, Niven, Russell	5:43
6.	"All Right"	Lardie, Niven	4:33
7.	"Sail Away"	Kendall, Niven	4:47
8.	"Gone with the Wind"	Lardie, Niven	5:01
9.	"Livin' In The U.S.A."	Lardie, Niven, Russell	5:32
10.	"If I Ever Saw A Good Thing"	Tony Joe White	4:23
Total length:			42:35

== Anaheim Live track listing ==
Recorded on the Westwood One Mobile, July 24, 1993, at the Celebrity Theatre in Anaheim, California. Engineered by Biff Dawes, Doug Field, Phillip Kneebone & Dennis Mays.

No.	Title	Writer(s)	Length
1.	"Call It Rock N' Roll"	Mark Kendall, Jack Russell, Alan Niven, Michael Lardie, Tony Montana	4:01
2.	"All Over Now"	Kendall, Niven, Lardie	4:56
3.	"Love Is A Lie"	Kendall, Lardie, Niven, Russell	7:24
4.	"Old Rose Motel"	Lardie, Niven	6:45
5.	"Babe (I'm Gonna Leave You)"	Anne Bredon, Jimmy Page, Robert Plant	7:18
6.	"Rock Me"	Kendall, Russell, Niven, Lardie	7:46
7.	"Once Bitten, Twice Shy"	Ian Hunter	5:46
Total length:			43:56

Japanese release
No.	Title	Writer(s)	Length
1.	"Call It Rock N' Roll"		4:01
2.	"All Over Now"		4:56
3.	"Cold-Hearted Lovin'"	Kendall, Niven, Lardie, Russell	4:31
4.	"Mista Bone"	Kendall, Niven Russell	8:34
5.	"Love Is A Lie"		7:24
6.	"Old Rose Motel"		6:45
7.	"Babe (I'm Gonna Leave You)"		7:18
8.	"Rock Me"		7:46
9.	"Once Bitten, Twice Shy"		5:46
Total length:			57:01

== Personnel ==
=== Great White ===
- Jack Russell – lead and backing vocals
- Mark Kendall – lead guitar, backing vocals
- Michael Lardie – rhythm guitar, banjo, sitar, keyboards, backing vocals, percussion, producer, arranger, engineer
- Teddy Cook – bass, third guitar, backing vocals
- Audie Desbrow – drums

=== Additional musicians ===
- Alan Niven – additional guitars, backing vocals, percussion, producer, arranger
- Clarence Clemons – saxophone on "Gone with the Wind"
- Suzie Katayama – cello

=== Production ===
- Biff Dawes, Doug Field, Jared Johnson, Philip Kneebone, Dennis Mays – engineers
- George Marino – mastering

== Charts ==
Chart (1994)	Peak position
Swiss Albums (Schweizer Hitparade)	43
US Billboard 200	168
