= Back to the Rhythm =

Studio album by Great White
- Released: July 17, 2007
- Recorded: March 2007
- Studio: Vivid Tone Studios, Beaumont, California
- Genre: Hard rock
- Length: 56:15
- Label: Shrapnel (US); Frontiers (worldwide)
- Producer: Michael Lardie

Great White chronology
Rock Me: The Best of Great White (2006)	Back to the Rhythm (2007)	Rising (2009)

Back to the Rhythm is the tenth studio album by American rock band Great White and first album of original material in about eight years. In 2006, Mark Kendall and Jack Russell wrote 15 songs for this comeback album. The album was recorded in just 24 days during March 2007 in Belmont, California. Back to the Rhythm was mixed, produced, and engineered by Michael Lardie with all members of the group contributing to the final mix.

Russell described the comeback album saying "The record's really eclectic, as the last one was, but it kind of explores the whole realm of where Great White has been throughout its musical career. One song's almost a step back. I don't mean in like a negative way…just kind of a step back, kind of a look at where we came from. It's pretty cool. I'm kind of excited about it, so I think people will dig it. If you're a Great White fan then you'll love it." Drummer Audie Desbrow says "It will sound like Great White but a really great production. The songs are very eclectic. Some songs sound as if they were from the 1984 era of Great White... There are a couple of songs on the new record that are very vintage Great White. I don't think this could have been achieved if we hadn't split up for all this time."

== Track listing ==
1. "Back to the Rhythm" (Michael Lardie, Jack Russell, Jack Blades) – 4:14
2. "Here Goes My Head Again" (Lardie, Russell, Blades) – 4:30
3. "Take Me Down" (Lardie, Russell, Mark Kendall, Audie Desbrow, Sean McNabb) – 4:32
4. "Play On" (Kendall, Russell, Blades, McNabb) 3:54
5. "Was It the Night?" (Lardie, Russell) – 5:20
6. "I'm Alive" (Kendall, Russell) – 5:22
7. "Still Hungry" (Kendall, Russell) – 5:02
8. "Standin' on the Edge" (Lardie, Russell) – 4:06
9. "How Far Is Heaven?" (Russell, Lardie) – 4:51
10. "Neighborhood" (Lardie, Russell, Blades) – 4:32
11. "Cold World" (Kendall, Russell) – 5:12
12. "Just Yesterday" (Kendall, Lardie, Russell) – 4:40

=== Bonus tracks ===
The following songs substitute "Cold World"

- "30 Days in the Hole" (Steve Marriott) – 3:53 (Humble Pie cover, UK release only)
- "Caledonia" (Jim Dewar, Robin Trower) – 3:49 (Robin Trower cover, Japan release only)

== Personnel ==
- Jack Russell – lead and backing vocals
- Mark Kendall – guitar, backing vocals
- Michael Lardie – guitar, keyboards, percussion, harmonica, backing vocals, producer, engineer
- Sean McNabb – bass, backing vocals
- Audie Desbrow – drums, percussion
