= House of Broken Love =

Single by Great White

from the album ...Twice Shy
- B-side: "Bitches and Other Women / Red House (live)"
- Released: 1989
- Length: 5:58
- Label: Capitol
- Songwriters: Jack Russell, Michael Lardie and Alan Niven
- Producers: Alan Niven, Michael Lardie

Great White singles chronology
"The Angel Song" (1989)	"House of Broken Love" (1989)	"Congo Square" (1991)

"House of Broken Love" is a song by the American rock band Great White. Written by Jack Russell, Michael Lardie and Alan Niven, the song is the eighth track from the band's fourth album, ...Twice Shy (1989). It peaked at numbers 78 and 83 on the US Cash Box Top 100 and Billboard Hot 100 charts, and number seven on the Billboard Mainstream Rock Tracks chart.

== Origin ==
Great White's lead singer Jack Russell stated in an interview with the BBC's The Friday Rock Show that the song is about being alone. He had recently gone through a divorce and was with bandmate Mark Kendall—who had also recently broken up—when the band's manager walked in and said, "What is this, the house of broken love?"

== Critical reception ==
Linda Romine, of the Record-Journal, called the song a "Great White staple".

== Notable performances ==
The band played the song at the American Music Awards of 1990.

== Charts ==
Chart (1990)	Peak position
UK Singles (Official Charts)	44
US Billboard Hot 100	83
US Mainstream Rock Airplay (Billboard)	7
US Cash Box Top 100	78
