= Out of the Night =

EP by Great White
- Released: 1983
- Recorded: November 6 and 17, 1982
- Studio: Total Access Recording, Redondo Beach, California
- Genre: Glam metal
- Length: 16:34
- Label: Aegean
- Producer: Michael Wagener, Don Dokken, Alan Niven

Great White chronology
Out of the Night (1983)	Great White (1984)

On Your Knees cover

Professional ratings
Review scores
Source	Rating
AllMusic	1.5/5 stars
Collector's Guide to Heavy Metal	8/10

Out of the Night is the first release by American hard rock band Great White in 1983. It was independently released and sold more than 8,000 copies in less than three months, with the band supporting Dokken in their 1983 US tour. This led to EMI picking up the band for their first full-length, self-titled LP. It was reissued as On Your Knees by Enigma Records in 1987, likely to capitalize on the band's growing popularity due to the album Once Bitten....

The songs also appeared on the US CD release of the live album Recovery: Live! and 3 of them ("Out of the Night", "On Your Knees" and "Dead End") appeared in the re-recorded versions on the debut LP.

== Track listing ==
All songs by Jack Russell and Mark Kendall, except "Dead End" by Russell, Kendall, and Gary Holland

1. "Out of the Night" – 2:14
2. "On Your Knees" – 4:19
3. "Last Time" – 3:42
4. "No Way" – 2:57
5. "Dead End" – 3:21

== Personnel ==
=== Great White ===
- Jack Russell – lead vocals
- Mark Kendall – guitar, backing vocals
- Lorne Black – bass
- Gary Holland – drums, backing vocals

=== Additional musicians ===
- Don Dokken, Michael Wagener, Alan Niven – backing vocals on "On Your Knees"
- Mary Ulanskas – additional vocals on "On Your Knees"

=== Production ===
- Michael Wagener – producer, engineer, mixing at Larrabee Sound Studios
- Don Dokken – producer
- Alan Niven – producer on "No Way", executive producer, management
- Sabrina Buchanek – mixing assistant
- Jack Hunt – mastering
