= Psycho City =

Studio album by Great White
- Released: September 14, 1992
- Recorded: February–June 1992
- Studios: Perkin's Ranch, Santa Ynez; The Great White Rehearsal Studio & Total Access Recording, Redondo Beach, California
- Genre: Heavy metal
- Length: 61:35
- Label: Capitol
- Producers: Alan Niven, Michael Lardie

Great White chronology
Hooked (1991)	Psycho City (1992)	The Best of Great White: 1986–1992 (1993)

Singles from Psycho City
- 1. "Big Goodbye" / "Livin' on Rock 'n Roll" Released: 1992; 2. "Love Is a Lie" / Somebody to Love" Released: 1992; 3. "Old Rose Motel" Released: 1992

Professional ratings
Review scores
Source	Rating
AllMusic	3/5 stars
Collector's Guide to Heavy Metal	6/10

Psycho City is the sixth studio album by the American hard rock band Great White, released on September 14, 1992. It was the last studio album produced for Capitol Records, with the exception of the 1993 compilation The Best of Great White: 1986–1992. It was reissued in 1999 by French label Axe Killer with four bonus tracks.

== Track listing ==
No.	Title	Writer(s)	Length
1.	"Psycho City"	Mark Kendall, Michael Lardie, Alan Niven, Jack Russell	6:07
2.	"Step on You"	Kendall, Lardie, Niven, Russell	5:50
3.	"Old Rose Motel"	Lardie, Niven	7:24
4.	"Maybe Someday"	Lardie, Niven, Russell	7:24
5.	"Big Goodbye"	Kendall, Niven, Russell	5:57
6.	"Doctor Me"	Kendall, Lardie, Niven	6:13
7.	"I Want You"	Kendall, Lardie, Niven, Russell	3:42
8.	"Never Trust a Pretty Face"	Kendall, Lardie, Niven	5:29
9.	"Love Is a Lie"	Kendall, Lardie, Niven, Russell	8:15
10.	"Get On Home"	Kendall, Niven, Russell	5:28

1999 re-issue bonus tracks
No.	Title	Writer(s)	Length
11.	"Somebody to Love" (Jefferson Airplane cover, also on the original Japanese pressing)	Darby Slick	4:17
12.	"Who's Driving Your Plane?" (The Rolling Stones cover)	Jagger/Richards	6:56
13.	"Livin' on Rock 'n Roll"	Kendall, Lardie, Niven, Russell	2:55
14.	"Wasted Rock Ranger"	C. Michael Baker	3:05

== Personnel ==
=== Great White ===
- Jack Russell – lead and backing vocals
- Mark Kendall – guitar, backing vocals
- Michael Lardie – guitar, keyboards, percussion, backing vocals, producer, arranger, engineer
- Audie Desbrow – drums

=== Additional musicians ===
- Alan Niven – backing vocals, percussion, producer, arranger
- Dave "The Beast" Spitz – bass
- Richie Gajate Garcia – percussion
- Rick Brewster – guitar

=== Production ===
- Melissa Sewell, Micajah Ryan – engineers
- Paul Wertheimer – assistant engineer
- George Marino – mastering

== Charts ==
Chart (1992)	Peak position
Swiss Albums (Schweizer Hitparade)	22
US Billboard 200	107
