= Sean McNabb =

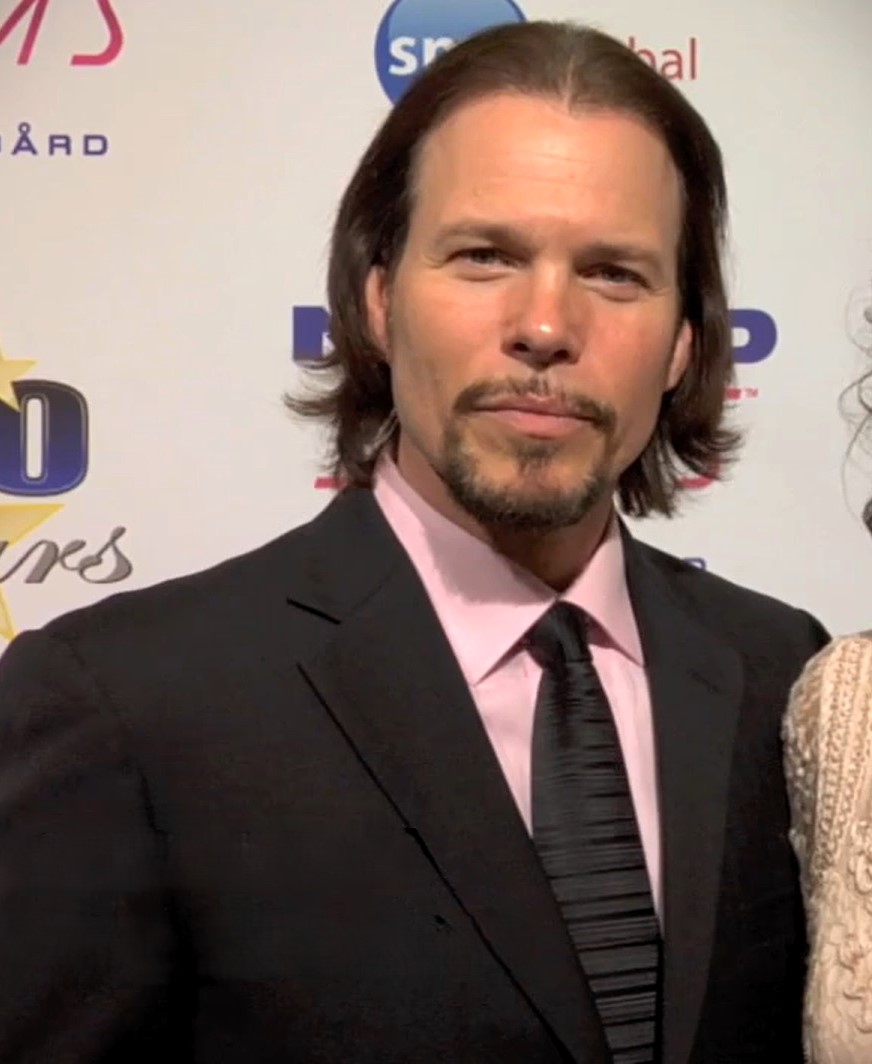
- McNabb in 2015

Background information
- Born: Sean Paul McNabb; September 24, 1965 (age 60); South Bend, Indiana, U.S.
- Genres: Hard rock, heavy metal, glam metal
- Occupations: Musician, actor
- Instrument: Bass guitar

Sean McNabb (born September 24, 1965) is an American actor and bassist. In 2015, he released his first solo music as a lead singer, "Fresh Air" and "America". Both are also featured in the film Rockstory.

McNabb was born in South Bend, Indiana. At age 22, he became the bass player of the 1980s metal band Quiet Riot, replacing Chuck Wright.

McNabb joined Dokken as their bassist in 2009 and was a mainstay with the band until 2014. He has recorded over 35 CDs in his discography. He has also toured and recorded with House of Lords (where he again replaced Wright), Great White, Lynch Mob, Montrose, Queensrÿche, Jack Wagner, Don Felder, Edgar Winter, Maya, Bad Moon Rising, Rough Cutt, Burning Rain, XYZ and David Lee Roth. McNabb can be heard on the Dr. Phil show in the music tracks and the "I'm Loving It" McDonald's breakfast commercials. McNabb has also performed with several pop artists, country, blues, and folk singer/songwriters.

In addition to music, acts in Hollywood in film and television and has twenty credits on IMDb. Of note, he appeared on FX TV's Sons of Anarchy and as host of Best of AXS TV Concerts 2012 – Legends of Rock. He starred along TV and Broadway greats in Los Angeles plays. He has appeared in films, TV and in commercials. He was on the cover, and was profiled, by the Beverly Hills Times as a rising star in the world of acting.

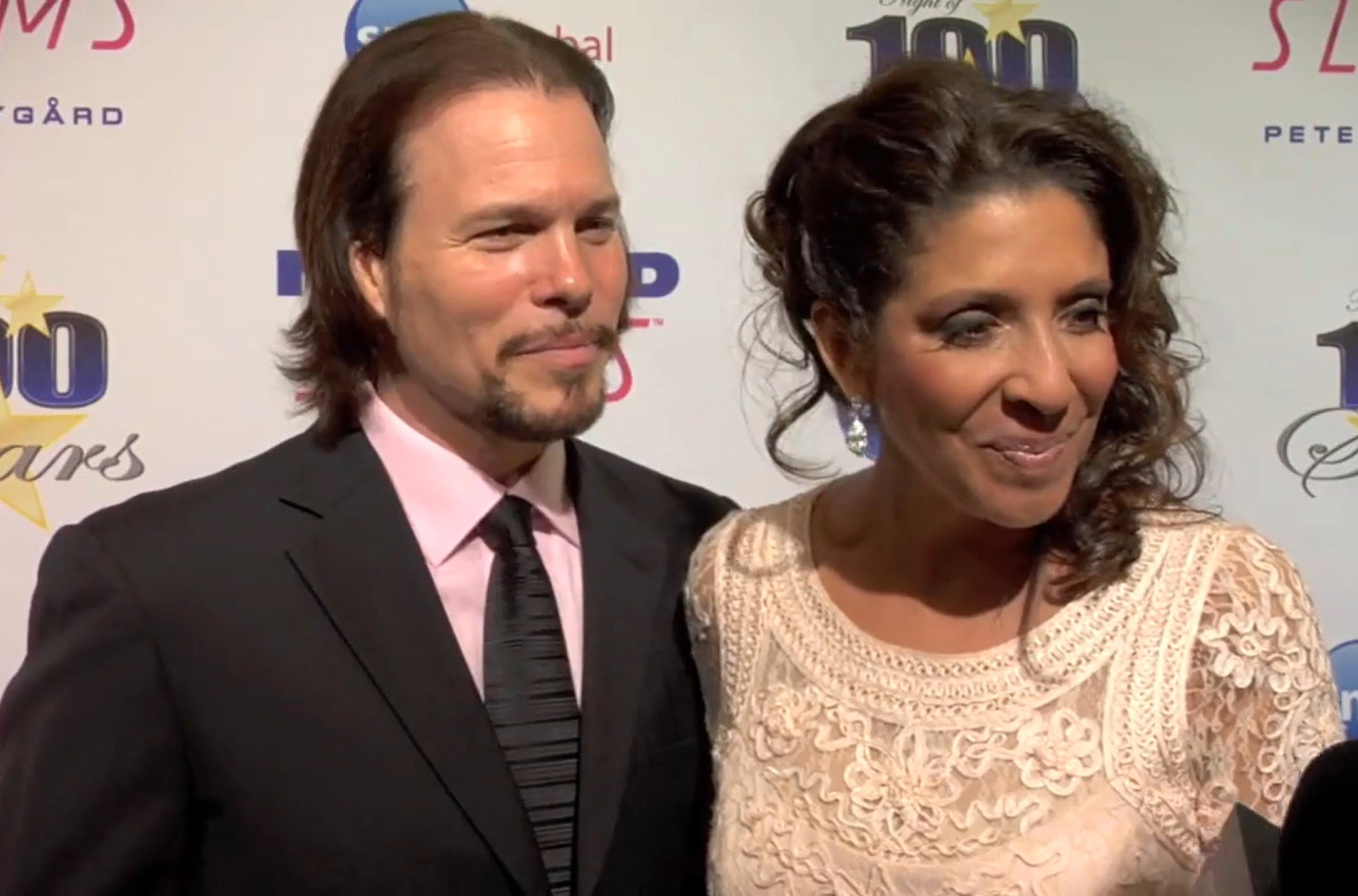
McNabb and Christine Devine at Night of 100 Stars 2015

McNabb is also active in the Los Angeles charity scene (including celebrity golf tournaments and Harley rides), appearing in such magazines as Angeleno and LA Confidential. He married Los Angeles based KTTV news anchor Christine Devine on September 9, 2016. He has a daughter, Lauriel, and a grandson, Malcolm.

== Discography ==
=== With Quiet Riot ===
- Quiet Riot (1988)

=== With House of Lords ===
- Demons Down (1992)

=== With Badd Boyz ===
- Bad Boyz (1993)

=== With Great White ===
- Great Zeppelin: A Tribute to Led Zeppelin (1998)
- Can't Get There from Here (1999)
- Latest and Greatest (2000)
- Thank You...Goodnight! (2002)
- Back to the Rhythm (2007)

=== With XYZ ===
- Letter to God (2003)

=== With Dokken ===
- Greatest Hits (2010)
- Broken Bones (2012)

=== With Burning Rain ===
- Epic Obsession (2013)

=== With Black Bart ===
- Bootleg Breakout

=== With Rough Cutt ===
- Sneak Peek EP (2000)

=== With Resurrection Kings ===
- Resurrection Kings (2015)

=== With Lynch Mob ===
- The Brotherhood (2017)
