= Great White =

American rock band

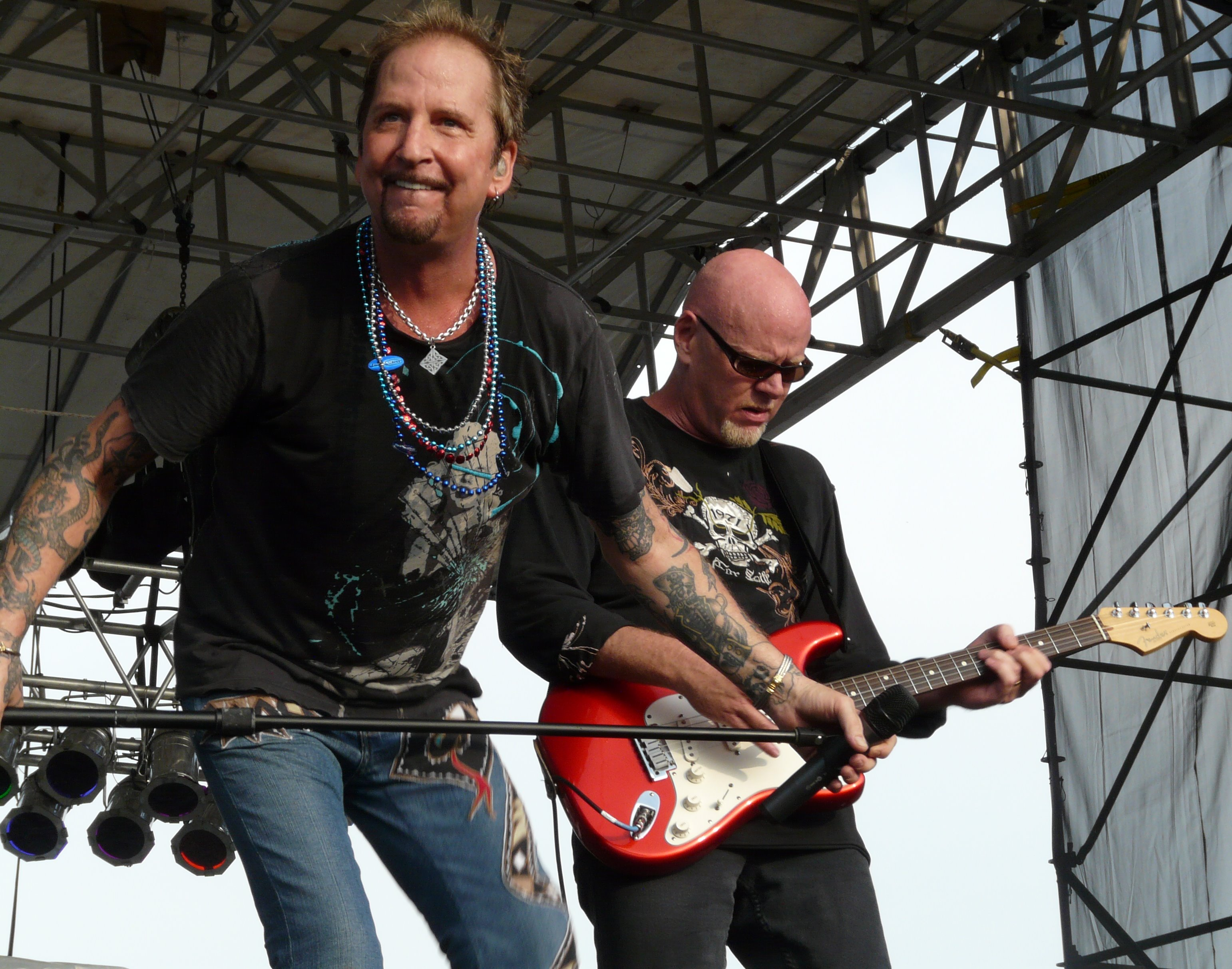
- Great White at Moondance Jam 2008

Background information
- Origin: Los Angeles, California, U.S.
- Genres: Hard rock; glam metal
- Works: Discography
- Years active: 1977–2001; 2006–present
- Labels: Capitol; Frontiers; Bluez Tone; Deadline
- Members: Mark Kendall; Audie Desbrow; Michael Lardie; Scott Snyder; Brett Carlisle
- Past members: Terry Ilous; Tony Montana; Ty Longley; Jack Russell; Lorne Black; Mitch Malloy; Gary Holland; Andrew Freeman
- Website: officialgreatwhite.com

Great White is an American hard rock band formed in Los Angeles in 1977. The band is named after both the shark with the same name, and guitarist Mark Kendall's former stage nickname. In August 2008, the band estimated they had sold around eight million records worldwide.

The band peaked with several albums during the mid-to-late 1980s, including the platinum-selling records Once Bitten (1987) and ...Twice Shy (1989), and those albums' singles "Rock Me" and "Once Bitten, Twice Shy" received considerable airplay through radio and MTV. They charted two Top 40 hit singles on the Billboard Hot 100, with "Once Bitten, Twice Shy" and "The Angel Song." They continued to release new material into the 1990s.

Great White disbanded in 2001, with several members releasing solo material. By the following year, however, Mark Kendall had joined up with lead singer Jack Russell's solo touring band, and the group began performing as Jack Russell's Great White, which also made headlines when, in 2003, their show pyrotechnics set a Rhode Island nightclub on fire, leading to the deaths of 100 people, including band member Ty Longley. In 2006, following a brief hiatus, the regular Great White reformed with other members of the classic lineup joining Russell and Kendall.

After more than three decades as their singer, Russell left the band in 2011 and again began touring with a backing band under the name Jack Russell's Great White, until Russell's retirement and death in 2024. Great White has since continued on without Russell, who was first replaced by XYZ vocalist Terry Ilous, who stayed in the band until 2018 when Mitch Malloy replaced him. Malloy left in 2022 and was replaced by Andrew Freeman, later followed by Brett Carlisle the same year.

== History ==
=== Early career and first two albums (1977–1986) ===
Vocalist Jack Russell met guitarist Mark Kendall in 1977, and Kendall asked Russell to join his band. They decided to form a band together and they called it Highway later changing it to Livewire and then played one final show as Wires. Then in 1979, Russell was arrested for shooting a live-in maid in a botched robbery attempt, and sentenced to eight years in prison. The band went its separate ways and Kendall was left to start over. He recruited bassist Don Costa (later a one-time member of Ozzy Osbourne and also briefly in W.A.S.P.) and drummer Tony Richards (later a member of W.A.S.P.). They auditioned several singers including John Bush from Armored Saint. They then got a singer named Butch Say whose style was similar to that of Rob Halford, but finally settled on a female singer Lisa Baker. The name they decided to go with was Dante Fox. They played their first gig in 1979 with singer Lisa Baker and played around Orange County and the Los Angeles area for six months with Lisa, until she joined George Lynch's band Xciter and Butch rejoined briefly. Later they found out that Russell was released from prison after serving only 18 months of his sentence and Russell talked Kendall into an audition and he got in the band by a two to one band vote. They played their first gig with Russell at The Troubadour in Hollywood, California.

Great White as a quartet in 1986. From left: Lorne Black, Mark Kendall, Jack Russell, Audie Desbrow.

After recording several demos, the band chose as manager Alan Niven, who had worked for the independent distributor Greenworld in Torrance, California, and had dealt with Mötley Crüe's debut self-release. Niven suggested the name change from Dante Fox after seeing Kendall stick his head out of a car window while driving by the Troubador and someone in the crowd said "there goes Great White". Kendall got the nickname due to his naturally white-blonde hair, white Fender Telecaster guitar, white jumpsuit, and white Capezio shoes. In 1982, the members by this time (as Costa and Richards had left) were Mark Kendall, Jack Russell, drummer Gary Holland, and bassist Lorne Black. They were soon in the studio and they recorded and released a 5-song EP, Out of the Night, on the independent label Aegean formed by Niven. Niven then convinced the Los Angeles radio station KMET to begin adding songs from the EP to its playlist in heavy rotation. KLOS-FM soon did the same. The band suddenly went from drawing a hundred people to a local club to drawing thousands in L.A. concert halls such as Perkins Palace in Pasadena, The Palace in Hollywood and the Country Club in Reseda. As an unsigned act, Great White headlined at Six Flags Magic Mountain in Valencia playing to 6,250 people. Near the end of 1983, EMI America signed the band and subsequently released Great White's eponymous debut album in early 1984. The band immediately toured the UK supporting Whitesnake's Slide It In tour and the entire US and Canada opening for Judas Priest's Defenders of the Faith tour. They also supported Kiss on their Lick It Up tour. Shot in the Dark, their follow-up independent release, marked the arrival of drummer Audie Desbrow after the firing of Holland on December 27, 1984. By the time Capitol Records signed the band and reissued Shot in the Dark, keyboardist-guitarist Michael Lardie, who had played on that album as a session musician, had come aboard as a full member. After the release of Shot in the Dark, Great White hit the road with Dokken for 5 shows and was on the verge of even bigger success.

=== Mainstream success (1987–1992) ===
The band hit the mainstream in 1987 when they released their third album Once Bitten, accompanied by the hits "Rock Me", "Save Your Love" and "Lady Red Light", all of which received significant airplay on mainstream rock radio stations such as KNAC and Z Rock. The model Tracy Martinson appeared on the cover of the album and also appeared in the video for "Save Your Love". In late 1987, Great White parted ways with bassist Lorne Black and replaced him with Tony Montana (Tony Cardenas). Once Bitten... was certified platinum in April 1988, and a year-long tour in support of the album cemented Great White's popularity worldwide, performing with Guns N' Roses, Twisted Sister, Whitesnake, David Lee Roth and TNT, and appearing on several dates as part the European Monsters of Rock tour in the summer of 1988 with several acts such as Kiss, Iron Maiden, Guns N' Roses, David Lee Roth, Megadeth, Helloween, Anthrax and Testament.

"Save Your Love" (1987)
A song from Once Bitten... Great White's first platinum selling album.

The band followed up with ...Twice Shy in 1989. The album included their biggest hit, "Once Bitten, Twice Shy", a cover of a UK hit single by Ian Hunter; this is Great White's only single to date that has achieved gold certification. The model Bobbie Brown (also known for being in Warrant's "Cherry Pie" video) appeared in the video for "Once Bitten, Twice Shy". Other songs from the album, including "The Angel Song", "House of Broken Love", "Mista Bone" and "Move It", received significant attention as well, through radio airplay or otherwise. ...Twice Shy was certified platinum in July 1989, then double platinum in September two months later, and received a Grammy Award nomination for Best Hard Rock Performance. The album was supported by a successful world tour that saw Great White performing at arenas and stadiums, including sharing the stage with Bon Jovi, Ratt, Tesla, Kix, Warrant, Badlands and Britny Fox, and supporting Alice Cooper on his Trash tour.

In 1990, the band featured in the heavy metal video series Hard 'N' Heavy containing music, concert footage and interviews. The video included Slash and Duff McKagan from Guns N' Roses appearing with the band at a Children of the Night Benefit concert in L.A., the performance helping to raise money for housing abused homeless children. Both bands shared the same manager, Alan Niven, at the time.

The band continued into the next decade performing the song "House of Broken Love" at the American Music Awards in January 1990. In March, Great White embarked on their first tour of Japan. They returned to the United States for the Memorial Day weekend festival dubbed The World Series of Rock, which featured Whitesnake, Skid Row, Bad English, and Hericane Alice. Great White recorded two more albums for Capitol Records, Hooked (1991), which was certified gold, and Psycho City (1992). In support of Hooked, Great White did a tour as opener for the German metal band Scorpions and traveled to Europe and Japan. During this tour Mark Kendall was hospitalized for a hiatal hernia for 3 weeks and then returned. Guitarist Al Pitrelli was asked to fill in for Mark during his absence. Psycho City was followed by a US tour with Kiss.

=== Years of commercial decline and disbandment (1993–2001) ===
Capitol issued the compilation The Best of Great White: 1986–1992 in 1993, when Great White had already departed the label to begin work on their next studio release, Sail Away. Before the release of the album, Great White spent seven months on the road headlining clubs. According to Lardie, it was "the longest stint we ever did without a break". Great White kept up the pace once Sail Away was released on Zoo Records in 1994, touring the US several times over the following year and a half. Their next release, Let It Rock, was released in 1996 through yet another label, Imago Records.

In 1999, the band released Can't Get There from Here and embarked on a tour with Ratt, Poison, and L.A. Guns. The album featured the single "Rollin' Stoned", which managed to chart at No. 8 on the Billboard Mainstream Rock Tracks chart.

In a memo dated January 20, 2000, Mark Kendall announced he was taking a hiatus from Great White. Shortly thereafter both Audie Desbrow and Sean McNabb left Great White. Russell would continue to tour with only Michael Lardie staying. Desbrow, clearly very unhappy with the financial state of the band and Russell's relapse in addiction, posted a tirade on his website lambasting Jack Russell while claiming to have been "fired" from Great White. Meanwhile, it was rumored that Sean McNabb was fired for going to management and asking to see the accounting books, though this was debunked by Desbrow, who stated that both he and McNabb had done so several times before getting fired. McNabb would later on state that his reason for being fired was because of his own addiction problems. The band announced plans to begin work on a new album in late 2000. Early in the process, some of the new songs were played for John Kalodner at Columbia Records. It was mutually agreed that the band needed a break and wanted to do outside projects. Kendall went on to make two solo albums. They subsequently left Columbia Records, curtailing any further work on the new album. On November 5, 2001, Jack Russell (following the death of his father) announced the end of Great White, stating that he was moving on, and that Great White would play a final string of dates, the final show on December 31, 2001, at the Galaxy Theatre in Santa Ana, California. Both Kendall and McNabb appeared for the farewell show (though they had already re-joined in August), recorded for a live CD titled Thank You...Goodnight! released by Knight Records. The live album includes two new tracks, "Back to the Rhythm" and "Play On" from their discontinued studio sessions, both of which would ultimately wind up on their reunion album Back to the Rhythm in 2007.

=== Reunion, the Station nightclub fire incident and aftermath (2002–2009) ===
By late 2002, following a relatively unsuccessful change in music direction with his second solo album, Jack Russell contacted Kendall, who was struggling with irrelevancy. Kendall agreed to play some dates with Russell's band. Billed as "Jack Russell's Great White", the tour was to consist primarily of classic songs from the Great White catalog with some of Russell's solo work mixed in. Eventually, more dates were added and the tour extended through the early months of 2003.

The band returned to the national spotlight on February 20, 2003. At the beginning of a Great White performance at The Station night club in Rhode Island, pyrotechnics used by the band's crew created a spray of sparks that ignited the makeshift and unapproved, unlisted foam soundproofing material affixed to the walls and ceiling around the stage. The soundproofing material was installed to help alleviate area neighbor noise complaints before the fire. One hundred people, including guitarist Ty Longley, died in the fire that followed. His son Acey Ty Christopher Longley was born in the summer of 2003 and is also a musician, running a charity called B.E.A.T.S. (Bringing Everyone A Tremendous Smile) for children in his father's memory. Approximately 115 survivors were badly burned, maimed, and permanently disfigured. In 2008, Jack Russell Touring INC., agreed to pay $1 million to survivors and victims' relatives of the fire while admitting to no wrongdoing. This amount also covers former tour manager Daniel Biechele along with the band members, record label, and management as it existed at the time of the fire. The settlement was the maximum allowed under the band's insurance plan. On the second anniversary of the fire, Jack Russell and Mark Kendall, along with Jack Russell's attorney, Ed McPherson, appeared on Larry King Live with three of the victims of the fire and the father of Ty Longley, to discuss some of the healing that had taken place over the previous two years and some of the permanent scars that remained. Victims had previously received $3.8 million raised by United Way of America.

Though the media referred to the band as Great White following the tragedy in Rhode Island, the band was still officially performing under the name Jack Russell's Great White at the time of the incident. Before the fire, the band's official website posted a message stating that Great White had not re-formed.

Jack Russell's Great White played their first full show following the Rhode Island tragedy on July 22, starting a benefit tour for the survivors and victims of the fire. The band toured until 2005 to raise funds for the Station Family Fund, which had been set up to help the victims of the tragedy. In late 2005, citing "medical reasons", the band canceled the second half of their summer tour. The "medical reasons" were claimed to have been related to Russell's relapses in alcohol and cocaine. This was the end of this version of Great White, as Jack Russell entered rehabilitation and did not perform again until 2007. Russell used the year of 2006 to get sober and get a facelift that was detailed on Extra. Russell later referred to this incarnation of Great White as "Fake White", saying "It still sounded like Great White, but not – almost like we were doing a cover of ourselves."

Talk of a reunion of Great White began in a 2004 interview, where Jack Russell told Metal Express Radio: "I spoke with Michael [Lardie], we threw that around a bit, and thought that sounds like a cool idea, it'd be fun. I'm pretty positive it's gonna happen... probably next year ... We talked to some other people, and [former drummer] Audie [Desbrow] would not be a person I would want to play with ever again in my life. There were some bridges burned there that I just can't forgive, and I'm a very forgiving person. I just can't let that one go. I have to stand up for myself..." Russell's stance towards Desbrow had significantly changed by 2006 when he told Mitch Lafon: "I talked to Michael Lardie the other day and he is into doing it. I just want to get hold of Tony Montana and Audie Desbrow. I think that would be very special for our 25th anniversary tour to have the same guys... we haven't played together in a very long time." Later in 2006, guitarist Mark Kendall officially announced that Great White had re-formed. The re-formed lineup of Russell, Kendall, Lardie, McNabb and Desbrow (the lineup from 1996-2000) played their first date together in more than 5 years on January 27, 2007, at the Keyclub in Hollywood performing in the Harpseals.org Benefit Concert for the Seals 2007. The band continued to tour throughout the rest of the year.

In 2008, bassist Sean McNabb left Great White to concentrate on a career in theater and acting. McNabb was promptly replaced with Scott Snyder (Ramos, Accomplice). McNabb then joined the band Dokken.

Great White released their album Rising on March 13, 2009, in Europe via Frontiers Records, and on April 21 in the US through Shrapnel Records. They then embarked on a supporting tour.

=== Split with Jack Russell and rotating singers (2010–present) ===
In 2010, Jani Lane of Warrant began filling in for Jack Russell, while Russell recuperated from surgery after suffering a perforated bowel. Terry Ilous (XYZ) replaced Jack Russell for several shows, beginning with a show at the Brixton South Bay in Redondo Beach, during August 2010, while Paul Shortino (Rough Cutt, Quiet Riot, King Kobra) filled in for Russell when Great White performed at Stockholm Rock Out Festival in September.

By 2011, Great White was touring regularly with Ilous fronting the band, as they continued waiting for Russell to fully recover and return as lead singer. The band appeared to be on good terms with Russell even as late as August 2011, when Kendall stated in an interview that the group were still actively awaiting his return to the stage, further indicating that Russell was not only supportive of the current situation, but even checking in with Ilous on occasion to give the latter encouragement and thank him for doing such a great job singing Great White's songs. However, Kendall did also state during this interview that while he and his bandmates were eager for Russell to rejoin, they did want to make sure the time was right and that "when he's back[,] he's back all the way." A later interview with Kendall provided additional detail, indicating that the band had initially hoped Russell would rejoin by the early summer of 2011, but that he was not in any condition to return at that time. Kendall also mentioned that the band had several stipulations that Russell would need to meet to return to the lineup, and that Russell himself had set a new target return date of February 2012, meaning he would not be performing with Great White for the remainder of 2011.

Before the year's end, however, Russell had apparently become impatient or disenchanted with this arrangement. In December 2011, just days after informing the band that (on advice from his doctor) he would not be able to rejoin by the February target date, he obtained a licensing agreement from Great White, and formed a new incarnation of Great White with a brand-new lineup under the name of Jack Russell's Great White. The other band members immediately voiced their surprise and strong objection to this move and said that "Jack Russell does not have the right to start his own Great White or use the name without our names in the lineup. We will litigate any promoter that books 'Jack Russell's Great White' or uses any logo featuring the name Great White." In September 2013, the parties finally reached an agreement in Federal Court that legally Jack Russell will turn all his rights to the "Great White" name over to Kendall, Lardie, and Desbrow. They in turn leased a way for Russell to make a living using the name Jack Russell's Great White with his own band, while the other original members would continue to tour with Terry Ilous, using the official name Great White.

On March 18, 2012, Great White announced their first new album with Ilous, Elation, to be released in May that year, along with a live album (Great White: 30 years – Live On the Sunset Strip) and a concert DVD of the band's 30th-anniversary show at the Key Club in Hollywood on March 22.

Meanwhile, Russell continued to front his own version of the group as Jack Russell's Great White. In July 2013, bassist Dario Seixas (Who had been in the band when Russell formed his separate band) left the group and was replaced by Great White's former bassist Tony Montana, who returned to a Great White–associated lineup after an absence of more than 20 years.

Lorne Black, Great White's original bassist, who performed and recorded with the group up through the Once Bitten album, died on September 27, 2013. He was 50 years old.

In a November 2015 interview with Dayton Daily News, Michael Lardie stated that Great White was "hoping to get into the studio in February or March to at least flesh out some ideas" for their next album. In October 2016, it was reported that Great White would enter WireWorld Studio in Mount Juliet, Tennessee, on January 2, 2017, to begin recording their new album with producer Michael Wagener, whose collaboration with the band dates back to their 1983 EP Out of the Night and 1984 self-titled debut album. On June 2, 2017, Great White released their most recent studio effort, Full Circle, on Bluez Tone Records, with Wagener as the producer. The song "Big Time" was released as the first single and video. This was the last studio effort featuring Terry Ilous on lead vocals before his replacement in 2018 by Mitch Malloy.

Meanwhile, Jack Russell's Great White released the single "Hard Habit" on December 19, 2014. On July 19, 2016, the group signed with Frontiers Music. The first single with Frontiers, "Blame It On The Night", was released November 30, 2016. The second single "She Moves Me" was released on December 14, 2016. On January 5, 2017, they premiered their third single "Love Don't Live Here". Jack Russell's Great White released the music video for the song "Sign of the Times" on January 18, 2017. The debut album He Saw It Comin' released on January 27, 2017.

In February 2017, it was announced that Great White would appear at Rockingham Festival 2017, to be held at Nottingham Trent University, UK, between October 20 and 22, 2017, the band scheduled to appear on Sunday 22nd. In late June, it was announced that Jack Russell's Great White would celebrate the 30th anniversary of Once Bitten by announcing a tour and a new acoustic album titled Once Acoustically Bitten, which was released on July 14, 2020. They performed material from both albums with the former being performed in its entirety on some shows. Before the tour, the band previewed material from the acoustic album on June 29 at the Guitar Center in Los Angeles.

On July 9, 2018, Great White announced that they had parted ways with Terry Ilous as their singer, a situation that he was not aware of until he found out "through an e-mail and the Internet", and he was replaced by Mitch Malloy. Guitarist Mark Kendall later claimed that one of the reasons the band had parted ways with Ilous was because the chemistry "wasn't working", and added that they "were kind of growing apart from Terry a little bit — not really for any reason. Nothing like big fights or anything."

On July 9, 2020, amidst growing COVID-19 numbers, Great White played an outdoor show in Malloy's birthplace, Dickinson, North Dakota, as part of "First on First Dickinson Summer Nights". While numerous events have been imposing restrictions, such as wearing masks and social distancing, "First on First" has no such rules in place. The concert did draw attention for the lack of safety measures during the pandemic, after which the band released a public apology statement.

On May 31, 2022, Great White announced they had parted ways with Mitch Malloy and replaced him with vocalist Andrew Freeman of Last in Line, and shortly thereafter, the band embarked on its first major tour with Freeman. The new lineup also intends to work on new music in the future. On October 19, it was announced that Brett Carlisle (who filled in for Freeman a month prior on several dates) was the new vocalist of the band, due to Freeman's commitment with Last in Line.

On July 17, 2024, Jack Russell announced that he was retiring from touring, following "a recent diagnosis of Lewy body dementia and multiple system atrophy" from May of that year. He died nearly a month after the announcement, on August 7, 2024, at the age of 63, leaving Kendall and Holland as the two remaining original members. Jack Russell's Great White was subsequently renamed Once Bitten.

== Musical style and influences ==
According to AllMusic, Great White's music is "rooted in the bluesy hard rock esthetic of classic rock radio of the 1970's." The band's music takes influence from bands such as AC/DC and Led Zeppelin, with the band covering several Led Zeppelin songs such as Immigrant Song and Rock and Roll in their live performances, and also releasing a full album of Led Zeppelin covers in 1999 titled Great Zeppelin: A Tribute to Led Zeppelin.

== Band members ==
Current

- Mark Kendall – lead guitar, percussion, backing vocals (1977–2000, 2001, 2002–2005, 2006–present), rhythm guitar (1977–1986)
- Audie Desbrow – drums, percussion (1985–2000, 2006–present)
- Michael Lardie – rhythm guitar, banjo, electric sitar, keyboards, percussion, harmonica, backing vocals (1987–2001, 2006–present; session 1986)
- Scott Snyder – bass, backing vocals (2008–present; not touring 2024)
- Brett Carlisle – lead vocals (2022–present)

== Discography ==
- Great White (1984)
- Shot in the Dark (1986)
- Once Bitten (1987)
- ...Twice Shy (1989)
- Hooked (1991)
- Psycho City (1992)
- Sail Away (1994)
- Let it Rock (1996)
- Can't Get There from Here (1999)
- Back to the Rhythm (2007)
- Rising (2009)
- Elation (2012)
- Full Circle (2017)

== See also ==
- List of glam metal bands and artists
