= Michael Lardie =

American musician

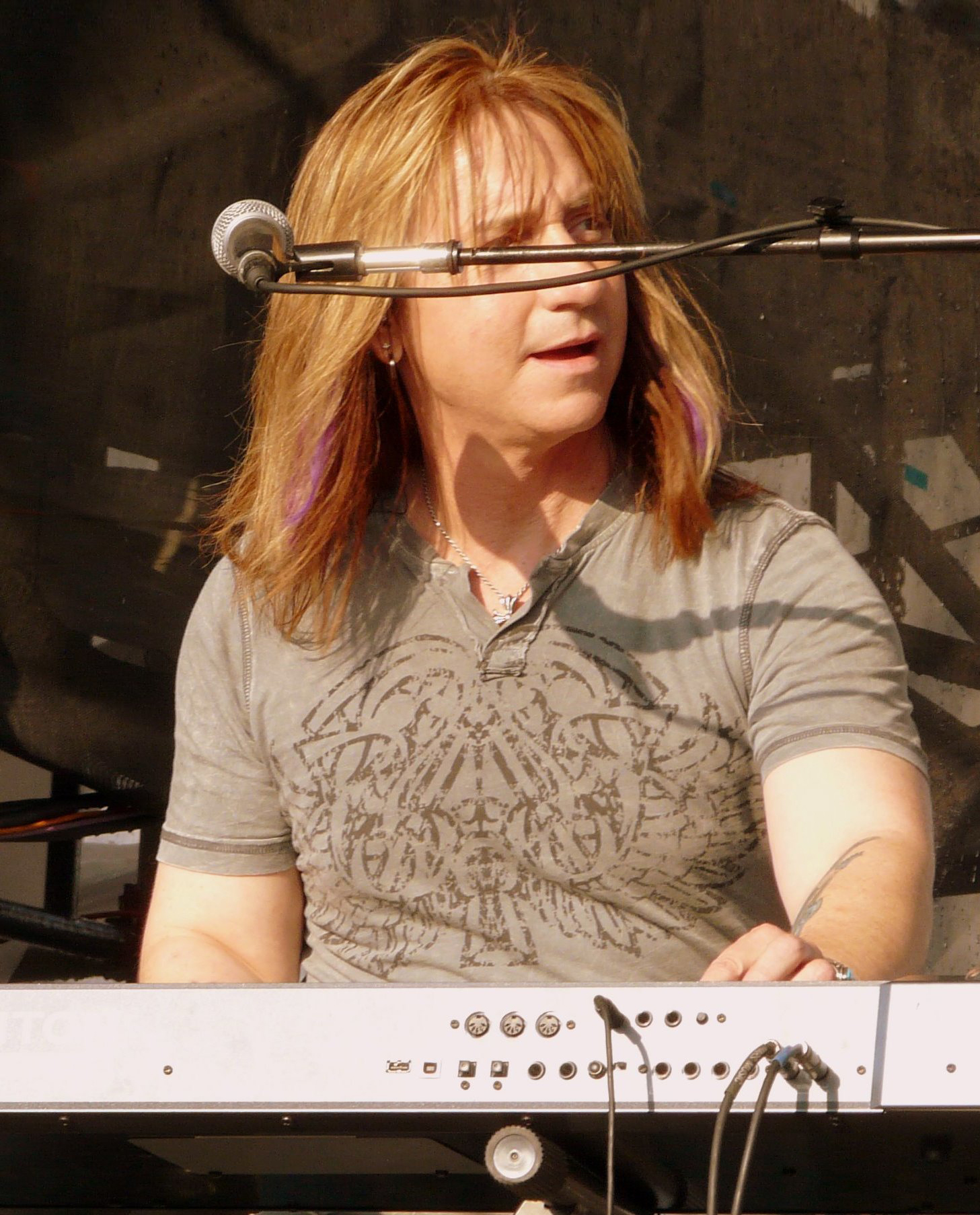
- Lardie with Great White in 2008

Background information
- Born: September 8, 1958 (age 67); Anchorage, Alaska, U.S.
- Origin: Sacramento, California, U.S.
- Genres: Hard rock, heavy metal, glam metal
- Occupations: Musician, producer
- Instruments: Keyboards, guitar

Michael Lardie (born September 8, 1958) is an American musician and record producer known for his memberships in the rock bands Great White and Night Ranger.

== Early life ==
Lardie was born on September 8, 1958, in Anchorage, Alaska and raised in Sacramento, California. He is a self-taught musician, having taken only a handful of lessons as a child. He plays guitar, bass, sitar, mandolin, piano, harmonica and flute. At age 17, he started playing in piano bars at night while still attending high school.

== Career ==
=== Producing and engineering – Early years ===
Michael spent most of the early to late eighties learning the craft of analog recording. Although he is well known for producing and engineering Great White records, most would be surprised to know he had a solid career recording other artists long before joining Great White. He worked on records by artists as diverse as Black Flag, Kajagoogoo, Dokken, Saint Vitus to name a few in his early career.

=== Great White ===
Lardie joined Great White in 1986 as a session and touring rhythm guitarist/keyboardist/backing vocalist and would eventually become a permanent band member, as well as the band's producer and engineer. The group broke up officially in 2000, and their final concert was recorded and released under the name Thank You...Goodnight!. In 2006, Great White reformed and continue to tour as of October 2008.

=== Production and engineering – Recent times ===
When Great White disbanded, Michael returned to his first love. Production. In recent years he has worked on records by Jake E. Lee, Leslie West, Colin Blades (son of Jack Blades, Night Ranger), Shaw Blades and Jizzy Pearl.

=== Night Ranger ===
Michael joined Night Ranger in 2003 as keyboardist/backing vocalist, replacing original keyboardist Alan Fitzgerald. He remained with them until 2007, being a member in both Great White and Night Ranger concurrently. When Lardie left Night Ranger to tour with Great White, Night Ranger hired Christian Matthew Cullen as a replacement.
