= The Best of Great White: 1986–1992 =

Greatest hits album by Great White
- Released: October 25, 1993
- Genre: Hard rock
- Length: 59:43
- Label: Capitol

Great White chronology
Psycho City (1992)	The Best of Great White: 1986–1992 (1993)	Sail Away (1994)

Professional ratings
Review scores
Source	Rating
AllMusic	4/5 stars
Collector's Guide to Heavy Metal	4/10
Kerrang!	3/5 stars

The Best of Great White: 1986–1992 is a compilation album released by the American hard rock band Great White in 1993.

== Track listing ==
No.	Title	Writer(s)	Original album	Length
1.	"Step on You"	Mark Kendall, Michael Lardie, Alan Niven, Jack Russell	Psycho City	5:51
2.	"All Over Now"	Kendall, Niven, Lardie	Once Bitten	4:23
3.	"Save Your Love"	Russell, Jerry Lynn Williams	Once Bitten	4:33
4.	"House of Broken Love"	Kendall, Niven, Russell	...Twice Shy	6:00
5.	"Big Goodbye"	Kendall, Niven, Russell	Psycho City	5:58
6.	"Rock Me"	Kendall, Russell, Niven, Lardie	Once Bitten	7:18
7.	"Face the Day"	John Brewster, Bernard Neeson, Rick Brewster	Shot in the Dark	7:03
8.	"Old Rose Motel"	Lardie, Niven	Psycho City	7:23
9.	"Once Bitten Twice Shy"	Ian Hunter	...Twice Shy	5:25
10.	"Afterglow"	Steve Marriott, Ronnie Lane	Hooked	5:49
Total length:				59:43

== Certifications ==
Region	Certification	Certified units/sales
United States (RIAA)	Gold	500,000^{^}
^{^} Shipments figures based on certification alone.
