= Greatest Hits (Great White album) =

Greatest hits album by Great White
- Released: June 5, 2001
- Recorded: 1981–2000
- Genre: Hard rock
- Length: 76:38
- Label: EMI / Capitol
- Producer: Kevin Flaherty

Great White chronology
Rock Champions (2000)	Greatest Hits (2001)	Recover (2002)

Professional ratings
Review scores
Source	Rating
AllMusic	4/5 stars
Kerrang!	2/5 stars

Greatest Hits is a compilation album released by the American hard rock band Great White in 2001. The album is perhaps the most widely available greatest hits package from the band, who have had several packages released, many without their express consent. A track from their previously unreleased MTV Unplugged session is included in this album.

The album was digitally remastered by Dave McEowen at Capitol Mastering.

== Track listing ==
1. "Stick It" (Mark Kendall, Jack Russell, Gary Holland, Lorne Black, Alan Niven) – 4:00 (from the album Great White)
2. "Rock Me" (M. Kendall, J. Russell, A. Niven, Michael Lardie) – 7:18 (from the album Once Bitten)
3. "Face the Day" (Blues Mix) (John Brewster, Bernard Neeson, Rick Brewster) – 7:04 (from the album Shot in the Dark)
4. "Save Your Love" (Jerry Lynn Williams, J. Russell) – 4:33 (from the album Once Bitten)
5. "Once Bitten, Twice Shy" (Ian Hunter) – 5:25 (from the album ...Twice Shy)
6. "Wasted Rock Ranger" (C. Michael Baker) – 3:06 (B-side of the single "Once Bitten, Twice Shy")
7. "Mista Bone" (M. Kendall, A. Niven, Audie Desbrow, Tony Montana) – 5:13 (from the album ...Twice Shy)
8. "The Angel Song" (M. Kendall, A. Niven) – 4:54 (from the album ...Twice Shy)
9. "House of Broken Love" (live) (J. Russell, A. Niven, M. Lardie) – 6:09 (from the album Live In London)
10. "Babe, I'm Gonna Leave You" (live) (Robert Plant, Jimmy Page, Anne Bredon) – 7:18 (recorded live on MTV Unplugged, June 5, 1990)
11. "Desert Moon" (live) (M. Lardie, A. Niven, M. Kendall, J. Russell) – 4:22 (from the album Live in New York)
12. "Call It Rock 'n Roll" (T. Montana, M. Lardie, A. Niven, J. Russell, M. Kendall) – 3:57 (from the album Hooked)
13. "Old Rose Motel" (M. Lardie, A. Niven) – 7:23 (from the album Psycho City)
14. "Big Goodbye" (M. Kendall, A. Niven, J. Russell) – 5:56 (from the album Psycho City)

== Lineup ==
- Jack Russell – vocals
- Mark Kendall – guitars, backing vocals
- Michael Lardie – keyboards, guitars, backing vocals (except track 1)
- Lorne Black – bass (on tracks 1–4)
- Tony Montana – bass (on tracks 5–12)
- Dave Spitz – bass (on tracks 13, 14)
- Audie Desbrow – drums (except track 1)
- Gary Holland – drums (on track 1)
