= Save Your Love (Great White song) =

Single by Great White

from the album Once Bitten
- B-side: "Mistreater"
- Released: 1987
- Recorded: 1987
- Studio: Total Access Recording
- Genre: Glam metal; acoustic rock
- Length: 4:22 (edit); 5:46 (album version)
- Label: Capitol
- Songwriters: Jerry Lynn Williams, Jack Russell
- Producers: Alan Niven, Mark Kendall, Michael Lardie

Great White singles chronology
"Rock Me" (1987)	"Save Your Love" (1987)	"Once Bitten Twice Shy" (1989)

"Save Your Love" is a power ballad by American glam metal band Great White. It was the second single from their 1987 album Once Bitten. The model Tracy Martinson appeared in the video for "Save Your Love". Also appearing in the video was then-new bassist Tony Montana, who replaced Lorne Black. Save Your Love was on the Billboard Hot 100 chart for 12 weeks, peaking at number 57 on February 27, 1988. The single mix of the song features a different guitar solo and is present on remastered reissues of Once Bitten.

== Track listings ==
7": Capitol Records (US)

No.	Title	Writer(s)	Length
1.	"Save Your Love (edit)"	Jerry Lynn Williams, Jack Russell	3:59
2.	"Mistreater"	Alan Niven, Russell, Lorne Black, Mark Kendall	3:58

12": Capitol Records / New Rock Radio Remix (US) (promotional only on white vinyl)

No.	Title	Length
1.	"Save Your Love (Hard Bite)"	4:29
2.	"Save Your Love (Soft Bite)"	3:59

7": Capitol Records (Germany)

No.	Title	Length
1.	"Save Your Love (edit)"	4:22
2.	"Mistreater"	5:45

12": Capitol Records (Germany)

No.	Title	Length
1.	"Save Your Love (Hard Bite)"	4:30
2.	"Mistreater"	5:45
3.	"Is Anybody There"	4:57

== Personnel ==
- Jack Russell – lead vocals
- Mark Kendall – guitar, backing vocals
- Michael Lardie – guitar, harmonica, backing vocals
- Audie Desbrow – drums
- Lorne Black – bass, backing vocals (on album)
- Tony Montana – bass, backing vocals (on music video)

== Charts ==
Chart (1987)	Peak position
US Billboard Hot 100	57
US Mainstream Rock (Billboard)	9
