= Hooked (Great White album) =

Studio album by Great White
- Released: February 26, 1991
- Recorded: September–November 1990
- Studio: Total Access (Redondo Beach, California)
- Genre: Hard rock
- Length: 51:51
- Label: Capitol
- Producers: Alan Niven; Michael Lardie

Great White chronology
...Twice Shy (1989)	Hooked (1991)	Psycho City (1992)

Singles from Hooked
- 1. "Congo Square" / "South Bay Cities" Released: February 4, 1991 (UK); 2. "Call It Rock n' Roll" / "Down at the Doctors" Released: March 6, 1991 (Japan); 3. "Desert Moon" / "Train to Nowhere" Released: May 1991 (US); 4. "Lovin' Kind" Released: 1991; 5. "The Original Queen Of Sheba" Released: 1991

Hooked
- Alternative cover artwork.

Live in New York
- Japanese edition bonus CD

Professional ratings
Review scores
Source	Rating
AllMusic	4/5 stars
Collector's Guide to Heavy Metal	4/10
Q	2/5 stars

Hooked is the fifth studio album by American rock band Great White, released on February 26, 1991. Though lacking a recognizable hit single and not as commercially successful as ...Twice Shy, it still managed to peak at No. 18 on the Billboard 200 album chart. The album was certified gold in April 1991. It was the band's last album to feature Tony Montana on bass guitar.

Q Magazine's Jeff Clark-Meads described the album as "relaxed, mellow and endearing - though this is likely to engender disappointment for those who hitherto considered Great White a metal act."

== Cover art ==
The original album cover art was photographed by fashion photographer John Scarpati and features a nude female model (Kristine Rose) being hoisted out of the sea by a large hook. The cover was judged too risque by the label and replaced by art director Hugh Syme shortly after the initial pressing with an alternative cover that has the hook still below the sea level and the model partially submerged, so that only her head and arms are visible. The initial Japanese pressing retained the original cover, and added a bonus CD entitled Live in New York, recorded at Electric Lady Studios on May 31, 1991.

== Desert Moon ==
The song "Desert Moon" was a minor hit and on February 20, 2003, was Great White's live opening song during which pyrotechnics ignited The Station nightclub fire, killing 100 people, including the band’s then-lead guitarist Ty Longley. The band did not perform "Desert Moon" live until the band toured to support the release of Back to the Rhythm.

== Track listing ==
No.	Title	Writer(s)	Length
1.	"Call It Rock N' Roll"	Tony Montana, Michael Lardie, Alan Niven, Jack Russell, Mark Kendall	3:56
2.	"The Original Queen of Sheba"	Rick Brewster, Niven, Lardie	4:39
3.	"Cold Hearted Lovin'"	Mark Anderson, Niven, Russell	4:19
4.	"Can't Shake It" (The Angels cover)	John Brewster, Bernard Neeson, R. Brewster	4:45
5.	"Lovin' Kind"	Lardie, Niven	4:45
6.	"Heartbreaker"	Lardie, Niven, Kendall, Russell	6:44
7.	"Congo Square"	Kendall, Niven	6:57
8.	"South Bay Cities"	Niven, Lardie	5:25
9.	"Desert Moon"	Lardie, Niven, Kendall, Russell	4:32
10.	"Afterglow" (Small Faces cover)	Steve Marriott, Ronnie Lane	5:49
Total length:			51:51

Japanese 2005 remastered edition bonus tracks
No.	Title	Writer(s)	Length
11.	"Train to Nowhere" (Savoy Brown cover)	Kim Simmonds, Chris Youlden	4:31
12.	"Weak Brain and Narrow Mind" (Willie Dixon cover)	Willie Dixon	3:12
13.	"Down at the Doctor (featuring Clarence Clemons)" (Dr. Feelgood cover)	Mickey Jupp	3:41
14.	"The Hunter" (Albert King cover)	Carl Wells, Donald "Duck" Dunn, Steve Cropper, Al Jackson Jr., Booker T. Jones	4:12
Total length:			67:27

Live in New York
No.	Title	Length
1.	"Intro"	0:35
2.	"Train to Nowhere"	4:34
3.	"Cold Hearted Lovin'"	4:34
4.	"The Hunter"	4:24
5.	"Desert Moon"	4:15
6.	"Band Intro's"	1:04
7.	"Weak Brain and Narrow Mind"	3:04
8.	"Rock Me"	7:49
9.	"Down at the Doctor"	3:24
10.	"Can't Shake It"	4:46
11.	"Once Bitten, Twice Shy"	6:13
Total length:		44:42

== Personnel ==
Great White

- Jack Russell – lead and backing vocals
- Mark Kendall – guitar, backing vocals
- Michael Lardie – guitar, keyboards, backing vocals, producer, arrangements, engineer
- Tony Montana – bass
- Audie Desbrow – drums

Additional musicians

- Michael Thompson – slide guitar solo on "Cold Hearted Lovin'"
- Alan Niven – backing vocals
- Simone Shook – backing vocals
- Terry Sasser – backing vocals

Production

- Alan Niven – producer, arrangements
- Melissa Sewell – engineer
- George Marino – mastering
- Hugh Syme – art direction, design

== Charts ==
=== Weekly charts ===
Chart (1991)	Peak position
Canada Top Albums/CDs (RPM)	27
Finnish Albums (The Official Finnish Charts)	25
German Albums (Offizielle Top 100)	32
Swiss Albums (Schweizer Hitparade)	5
UK Albums (Official Charts)	43
US Billboard 200	18

=== Year-end charts ===
Chart (1991)	Position
US Billboard 200	90

== Certifications ==
Region	Certification	Certified units/sales
Canada (Music Canada)	Gold	50,000^{^}
United States (RIAA)	Gold	500,000^{^}
^{^} Shipments figures based on certification alone.
