= The Angel Song (song) =

Single by Great White

from the album ...Twice Shy
- B-side: "Run Away"
- Released: 1989
- Recorded: 1989
- Studio: Total Access (Redondo Beach, California)
- Genre: Rock
- Length: 4:51
- Label: Capitol
- Songwriters: Mark Kendall; Alan Niven
- Producers: Alan Niven; Michael Lardie

Great White singles chronology
| "Once Bitten, Twice Shy" (1989) | "The Angel Song" (1989) | "House of Broken Love" (1989) |

"The Angel Song" is a song by the American rock band Great White. It was released as the second single from their fourth studio album, ...Twice Shy (1989).

== Charts ==
| Chart (1989) | Peak position |
|---|---|
| US Billboard Hot 100 | 30 |
| US Mainstream Rock (Billboard) | 18 |
