= Once Bitten (Great White album) =

Studio album by Great White
- Released: June 17, 1987
- Recorded: 1987
- Studios: Total Access Recording, Redondo Beach, California
- Genres: Glam metal; blues rock; hard rock
- Length: 46:32
- Label: Capitol
- Producers: Alan Niven, Mark Kendall, Michael Lardie

Great White chronology
Shot in the Dark (1986)	Once Bitten (1987)	...Twice Shy (1989)

Singles from Once Bitten
- 1. "Rock Me" / "Fast Road" Released: 1987; 2. "Save Your Love" / "Mistreater" Released: 1987

Professional ratings
Review scores
Source	Rating
AllMusic	4/5 stars
Collector's Guide to Heavy Metal	2/10
Crash	5/6
Rock Hard	7.5/10

Once Bitten is the third studio album by American glam metal band Great White. It was released on June 17, 1987, by Capitol Records. The album became a commercial success, selling more than one million copies and being certified Platinum in April 1988. The anthem "Rock Me" became a hit single, charting in September 1987, and is one of Great White's best known songs. AllMusic explains in their review that it brought Great White a broader audience. "Save Your Love" also charted, becoming their most famous power ballad at the time, in February 1988. "Lady Red Light" and "All Over Now" would become fan favorites and be included among 15 tracks on their later retrospective, "Absolute Hits". It was the band's last album to feature bassist Lorne Black.

In the UK, the track listing was significantly altered, losing four new tracks and replacing them with songs from 1986 album Shot in the Dark and with a live version of "What Do You Do". Russell would state that this was because of complications surrounding Shot in the Dark's release. The album's opening track, "Lady Red Light", was featured on the NBC show Parks and Recreation in the episode "Tom's Divorce". The model photographed on the cover is Tracy Martinson who appeared in four of their videos.

== Legacy ==
In 2017, Jack Russell's Great White celebrated Once Bitten's anniversary by announcing a tour and an acoustic re-recording of the album. The acoustic version, "Once Bitten Acoustic Bytes", was released in 2020.

== Track listing ==
Side one
No.	Title	Writer(s)	Length
1.	"Lady Red Light"	Mark Kendall, Jack Russell, Alan Niven, Michael Lardie	4:55
2.	"Gonna Getcha"	Kendall, Niven, Lardie	4:13
3.	"Rock Me"	Kendall, Russell, Niven, Lardie	7:19
4.	"All Over Now"	Kendall, Niven, Lardie	4:22

Side two
No.	Title	Writer(s)	Length
5.	"Mistreater"	Kendall, Russell, Niven, Lorne Black	5:50
6.	"Never Change Heart"	Kendall, Russell, Niven	4:28
7.	"Fast Road"	Kendall, Russell, Niven, Black, Audie Desbrow, Lardie	3:41
8.	"On The Edge"	Kendall, Russell, Niven	6:02
9.	"Save Your Love"	Russell, Stephan John Williams	5:46

=== UK edition track listing ===
Side one

1. "Lady Red Light"
2. "Gonna Getcha"
3. "Rock Me"
4. "All Over Now"

Side two

5. "Fast Road"
6. "What Do You Do" (live)
7. "Face the Day" (US Radio Blues Version)
8. "Gimme Some Lovin'"

=== International alternate track listing ===
Side one

1. "Lady Red Light"
2. "Gonna Getcha"
3. "Fast Road"
4. "Mistreater"
5. "All Over Now"

Side two

1. "Never Change Heart"
2. "Rock Me"
3. "On the Edge"
4. "Save Your Love"

== Personnel ==
=== Great White ===
- Jack Russell – lead and backing vocals
- Mark Kendall – lead guitar, backing vocals
- Michael Lardie – rhythm guitar, keyboards, harmonica, backing vocals
- Lorne Black – bass, backing vocals
- Audie Desbrow – drums

=== Production ===
- Arranged and produced by Alan Niven, Michael Lardie and Mark Kendall
- Engineered by Michael Lardie and Eddie Ashworth
- Mastered by George Marino

== Charts ==
Chart (1987)	Peak position
Canada Top Albums/CDs (RPM)	91
US Billboard 200	23

== Certifications ==
Region	Certification	Certified units/sales
Canada (Music Canada)	Gold	50,000^{^}
United States (RIAA)	Platinum	1,000,000^{^}
^{^} Shipments figures based on certification alone.
