= Twice Shy =

Twice Shy may refer to:

- Twice Shy, a 1981 novel by Dick Francis
- an official text adventure game based on the novel
- "Twice Shy" (Farscape episode), a 2003 episode in Season 4 of Farscape
- ...Twice Shy, a 1989 album by Great White
