= Ariel Hyatt =

American writer and digital marketer

- Hyatt in 2025
- Born: Pittsfield, Massachusetts
- Education: Clark University
- Occupations: Writer and digital marketer
- Writing career
- Notable work: Music Success in 9 Weeks (2009)
- Website: cyberprmusic.com

Ariel Hyatt is an American music marketing strategist, author, educator, and the founder of Cyber PR, a New York digital marketing firm for independent musicians. She is the author of seven books including Music Success in 9 Weeks (2009), Cyber PR For Musicians (2013), the crowdfunded Crowdstart (2016), and From Buzz to Bond (2025). She is the host of Cyber PR Music Podcast and has interviewed guests including Derek Sivers, Manafest, Julie Flanders and Dan Mangan and has been a featured speaker at SXSW, Midem, MONDO, Make Music New York, and Grammy Camp. Hyatt is a board member at Sweet Relief Musicians Fund.

== Background and education ==
Hyatt is the daughter of entrepreneur Carole Hyatt and television producer Gordon Hyatt; the former wrote The Women's Selling Game: How to Sell Yourself and Anything Else, which was a New York Times bestseller. Ariel grew up in New York City attending clubs like CBGBs, The Limelight and The Tunnel. She has said of her upbringing, "I think sitting at the dinner table was the beginning of my education, just having this amazingly dynamic mother who was creating things when women weren't really yet in the work force."

Hyatt attended Clark University in Worcester, Massachusetts, where she studied theater, and sang in the Clark Bars an a cappella group, graduating in 1993.

== Early career ==
After college Hyatt worked at New York City's WNEW-FM, a record store, a music public relations firm, and a record label, What Are Records?. She moved to Boulder, Colorado with the label, was hired full-time then assisted a concert promoter and managed a local funk band, Lord of Word, and handled their publicity. When the band experienced success, Hyatt picked up more work. She was then employed by the city's Fox Theatre, which had music nightly, and has said it was her best job.

== Career ==
Hyatt founded Ariel Publicity which she ran from her Boulder apartment. Three years into the company, she had a roster of 22 bands from across the United States. She was called by Denver Live "one of the most respected and sought after artist relations representatives" in the state and quoted by the alternative weekly Westword, in assessing the music scene in Colorado's capital. She told the latter, "I've come to realize that Denver is a very unique market. Things that are very, very popular in Denver don't necessarily translate once you're out of Denver.... It's the same thing for national acts. I've seen shows that have sold out nationwide take a bath in Denver. Colorado audiences don't care what's hot or in or trendy. They just want to have a good time." She also noted that bands in the north-central city held a geographic disadvantage for touring compared to music groups from cities on the East Coast which were located within more tolerable driving distances of each other.

She opened Ariel Publicity's office in New York City in 2000, before moving back permanently. The company went completely digital in January 2007.

Her clients included the Toasters (whose shows she used to attend avidly as a teen), Cherry Poppin' Daddies, and George Clinton. She credits her time at What Are Records? for allowing her to "really [watch] what everyone in every department did." At this small scale, the employees also all knew every aspect of the business and their positions were interchangeable. In 2012 Hyatt started to represent authors, apps, and thought leaders.

Hyatt wrote her first book, Music Success in 9 Weeks, in 2008. Now in its third edition, it helps artists at all stages of their careers navigate social media sites like Facebook, YouTube, and Twitter, teaching them how to be profitable. Hoopla Digital wrote that "her tactics have actualized exponential success for her most proactive readers by giving them a solid business strategy." There were further online accolades for the book.

Hyatt's second book, Cyber PR for Musicians: Tools, Tricks, & Tactics for Building Your Social Media House, published in 2012, was called by MEIEA Journal "the most complete book of its kind" and described Hyatt as "a renowned New York publicist who has leaped into the internet as a promotional tool with alacrity and resolve." In 2013, she crowdfunded to produce her next two books, aiming for $50,000 and receiving $61,000. A resulting 2016 book, Crowdstart which used her experiences, was called by TuneCore's Kevin Cornell as "a must-have" for independent musicians looking to grow those skills and recommended as a holiday gift idea by Bobby Owsinski. In 2018 she was interviewed by Sallie Krawcheck on the Ellevate podcast about personal branding.

In 2020, Hyatt was a featured speaker at MONDO NYC. In 2021, she released The Ultimate Guide to Music Publicity: Proven Strategies For Getting Featured In Blogs, Playlists, & Traditional Media In 2025, Hyatt released From Buzz to Bond and taught a masterclass at Berklee NYC based on the book. That same year, she was interviewed by Bobby Owsinski on the the Inner Circle podcast about Bond Marketing, a 10-step system known as the Bond Marketing Funnel.

== Influence ==
Hyatt has spoken about marketing and social media on the Internet at such conferences as the New Music Seminar, SXSW, CMJ, Vivid Sydney, Hubspot Ignite, Campus Party London, The 140 Conference, You Are in Control (Reykjavík), and MIDEM. She has toured Australia, teaching artists across the continent her day-long marketing master class. She has over 90,000 followers on Twitter.

In 2011, Middle Tennessee State University started offering a Cyber PR Class based on Hyatt's principles. The university is recognized by Rolling Stone as having "one of the preeminent music business programs in the country."

== Books ==
- Music Success in 9 Weeks, 2008, 2009, 2012
- Cyber PR for Musicians: Tools, Tricks, & Tactics for Building Your Social Media House, 2012
- Crowdstart: The Ultimate Guide to a Powerful and Profitable Crowdfunding Campaign, 2016
- Social Media Tuneup, 2017
- The Ultimate Guide to Spotify & Soundcloud, 2017
- The Ultimate Guide to Music Publicity, 2017
- From Buzz to Bond, 2025

Written with Carla Lynn Hall

- Musician's Roadmap to Facebook and Twitter: Your Complete Guide to Getting Followed, Liked, and Heard, 2011

Written with Charlie B. Dahan and A. Richard Meitin

- Cyber PR for Musicians: Tools, Tricks, & Tactics for Building Your Social Media House (Teacher's Guide), 2013
