= The Set Up (Parks and Recreation) =

- Parks and Recreation episode
- Episode no.: Season 2 Episode 13
- Directed by: Troy Miller
- Written by: Katie Dippold
- Original air date: January 14, 2010

Guest appearances
- Will Arnett as Chris; Jim O'Heir as Jerry Gergich; Scott Portlock as Brian; Justin Theroux as Justin Anderson; Retta as Donna Meagle; Ben Schwartz as Jean-Ralphio Saperstein

Episode chronology
← Previous "Christmas Scandal"	Next → "Leslie's House"
- Parks and Recreation season 2

"The Set Up" is the 13th episode of the second season of the American comedy television series Parks and Recreation, and the nineteenth overall episode of the series. It originally aired on NBC in the United States on January 14, 2010. In the episode, Leslie (Amy Poehler) is set up on a blind date with an MRI technologist, played by Poehler's then-husband, comedic actor Will Arnett.

The episode was directed by Troy Miller and written by Katie Dippold. In addition to Arnett's performance, "The Set Up" featured the first of several guest appearances by Justin Theroux, who portrayed a love interest for Leslie, and Ben Schwartz, who played Tom's fast-talking friend Jean-Ralphio.

According to Nielsen Media Research, "The Set Up" was seen by 4.59 million households, which was considered consistent with other second season episodes. "The Set Up" received generally positive reviews.

== Plot ==
When Leslie learns Pawnee is being sued by the previous owners of the lot where she is seeking to build a park, Ann refers her to her lawyer friend Justin Anderson, who she calls "the greatest guy ever". Justin helps Leslie resolve the issue, and the two seem to get along very well together. Having recently broken up with her boyfriend, Leslie asks Ann to set her up on a date, but is surprised when Ann hesitates to set her up with Justin. Instead, she arranges a date with Chris an MRI technologist Ann works with. The date goes poorly, with Chris appearing annoyed upon learning Leslie attended a rival college, and that she was a director of regular parks, not amusement parks.

When Leslie said she has never received an MRI, Chris takes her to the hospital to receive one. Chris makes uncomfortable comments, remarking that Leslie has an excellent uterus ("could easily have triplets right off the bat") and asking whether she is having her period, presumably in anticipation of sex later. Leslie rejects his advances when the date ends, prompting him to make an angry goodbye, even though Leslie still needs to give him a ride home. Meanwhile, Mark grows suspicious that Ann harbors romantic feelings for Justin. He eventually confronts Ann and accuses her of trying to "save" Justin for a possible relationship in the future, and after Ann lamely half-denies this is true, Mark leaves their date night and annoyedly spoils the ending of the movie they'd planned to watch (Marley & Me). Mark asks Ann's ex-boyfriend Andy, who also recalls Ann's infatuation with Justin and makes sure to tell Mark that Justin is a far better man than he is. Andy scolds Ann for hurting Mark's feelings, then tries to trick her into thinking she was still dating him, which does not work. Realizing her behavior was inappropriate, Ann sets Leslie up on a date with Justin.

Meanwhile, Ron deals with complaints from local residents due to a new town policy requiring public officials to deal more directly to the public. Ron calls the policy "my hell", and seeks a new assistant to protect him from the citizens. Tom volunteers to find Ron an assistant, but during job interviews he asks questions about "real-world expertise", such as what tie he should wear to the club and what to text girls after a party. Tom brings forward a fast-talking candidate named Jean-Ralphio, whose personality closely resembles Tom's. Ron hates him right away. April draws attention around the office for showing up late and slacking off at work. Bored with her internship, April insists she cannot wait to leave the parks department. However, after spending time with Andy at the town hall shoeshine stand where he works, April decides she wants to stay closer to him and volunteers to be Ron's assistant. She also convinces Andy to sell his band's CDs at the hall, which proves successful. When she slams the door on Tom while he tries to talk to them, Ron immediately hires her.

== Production ==
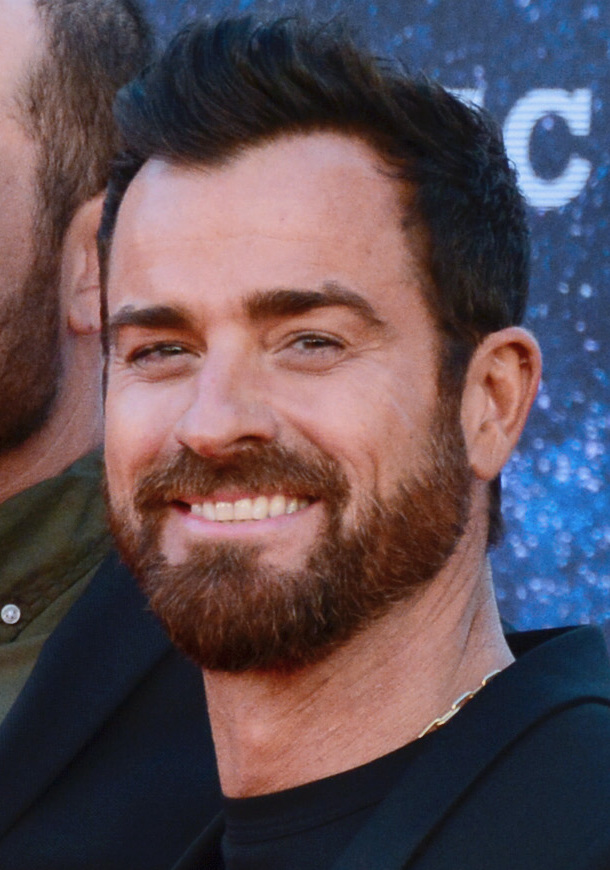
Justin Theroux (pictured) made a guest appearance as Justin, a love interest for Leslie Knope.

"The Set Up" was directed by Troy Miller and written by Katie Dippold. It featured guest appearances by Will Arnett as MRI technologist Chris and Justin Theroux as Ann's lawyer friend Justin, Arnett was at the time the real-life husband of Amy Poehler, who plays protagonist Leslie Knope. It was not Poehler who arranged for him to be on the show, but rather Parks and Recreation co-creator Michael Schur, who is a good friend of Arnett and felt he would be a good fit for the character. Their date scenes marked the second on-screen pairing between a Parks and Recreation actor and their real-life spouse; Megan Mullally, the wife of actor Nick Offerman, guest starred as Ron Swanson's ex-wife Tammy in the episode, "Ron and Tammy". Although Theroux was slated to make appearances in multiple Parks and Recreation episodes, Arnett was scheduled to appear only in "The Set Up". "The Set Up" also marked the first of several recurring appearances by Ben Schwartz as Tom's friend Jean-Ralphio Saperstein. Schur said the character was invented because the Parks and Recreation staff liked the actor and tried to find a way to work him into the show.

== Cultural references ==
At the start of the episode, Leslie had a large framed photo of Dave Sanderson, the Pawnee police officer she had recently broken up with in the episode "Christmas Scandal". Sanderson was played by stand-up comedian Louis C.K. in several of Parks and Recreation episodes. When asked about her ideal man, Leslie said she wanted somebody with the brains of film star George Clooney and the body of Joe Biden, the 67-year-old Vice President of the United States. April said she was late for work because she had to finish watching the 2002 teenage horror-film Swimfan. Ann and Mark watch the 2008 comedy-drama film Marley & Me and the 2009 sci-fi action film District 9.

== Reception ==
In its original American broadcast on January 14, 2010, "The Set Up" was seen by 4.59 million households, according to Nielsen Media Research. The viewership was considered consistent with other second season episodes. "The Set Up" drew a 2.1 rating/6 share among viewers aged between 18 and 49. The episode received generally positive reviews. Entertainment Weekly writer Sandra Gonzalez favorably compared the on-screen pairing of Poehler and Arnett to the comedic chemistry between Jennifer Aniston and her then-husband Brad Pitt when he guest-starred on the sitcom Friends. However, Gonzalez said the Poehler and Arnett scenes were "the best worst first date I’d seen on TV in a while". Gonzalez also said she continued to be bored by the subplots involving Ann and Mark.

Steve Heisler of The A.V. Club complimented "The Set Up" and said the characters played off each other well, but added the episode "felt a little too plot driven to ascend to A-material heights". Heisler particularly praised the performances of Chris Pratt and Will Arnett, who he said displayed a subtler sense of humor than in his role on the television series Arrested Development. TV Squad writer Kona Gallagher praised the episode, and said she was glad the writers found a reason to keep April in the show without keeping her on as an intern indefinitely. Gallagher also said the jealousy issue was handled well between Mark and Ann, giving the impression of true feelings between the characters. Alan Sepinwall of The Star-Ledger praised the decision of April becoming Ron's assistant because of the comedic potential of the duo. Sepinwall said although Theroux was charming and funny, Arnett "didn't quite fit into the show's low-key, naturalistic vibe".

== DVD release ==
"The Set Up", along with the other 23 second season episodes of Parks and Recreation, was released on a four-disc DVD set in the United States on November 30, 2010. The DVD included deleted scenes for each episode.
