= Hunting Trip =

- Parks and Recreation episode
- Episode no.: Season 2 Episode 10
- Directed by: Greg Daniels
- Written by: Daniel J. Goor
- Original air date: November 19, 2009

Guest appearances
- Travis Guba as Mechanic; Jay Johnston as Ranger; Yvans Jourdain as Councilman Douglass Howser; Jim O'Heir as Jerry Gergich; Retta as Donna Meagle

Episode chronology
← Previous "The Camel"	Next → "Tom's Divorce"
- Parks and Recreation season 2

"Hunting Trip" is the tenth episode of the second season of American comedy television series Parks and Recreation, and the sixteenth overall episode of the series. It originally aired on NBC in the United States on November 19, 2009. In the episode, Leslie tries to prove she can hang out with the guys by attending Ron's annual hunting trip, where Ron is accidentally shot.

The episode was written by Daniel J. Goor and was directed by series co-creator Greg Daniels. It also introduced a romantic subplot between the characters Andy and April which continued throughout the second season and into the third. Series co-creator Michael Schur said the pairing was not previously planned but grew when it was discovered actors Aubrey Plaza and Chris Pratt had strong comedic chemistry together.

According to Nielsen Media Research, "Hunting Trip" was seen by 4.61 million viewers, a slight drop from the previous week's episode, "The Camel". The episode received generally positive reviews, with commentators particularly praising the Andy and April subplot, as well as the continued development of Leslie Knope's character.

== Plot ==
The episode opens with Andy giving piggyback rides to everyone in the parks department. Later, Ron, Jerry and Mark look forward to their annual "trail survey", which is actually a yearly secret hunting trip. Determined to prove she can be just like one of the guys around the office, Leslie insists the ladies of the parks department attend the trip this year, as well as Tom, who has also never been invited. Ron is visibly disappointed.

Leslie asks April to check on a budgeting request while they are gone. What should be a simple chore, however, has April waiting on hold at the phone for hours. When she desperately has to use the restroom, Andy agrees to wait by the phone. When she returns, the two start to bond by making up their own lyrics to the hold music, playing a non-water game of Marco Polo around the office, and seeing who can make the best spit-take. When Andy says he is jealous that his ex-girlfriend Ann is going to the hunting trip with Mark, April offers to give him a hickey to make Ann jealous, which Andy accepts.

Meanwhile, the others arrive at the cabin for the hunting trip. Leslie proves to be an excellent hunter and bags the first quail. Growing increasingly threatened, Ron agrees to a challenge that Leslie cannot shoot more birds than he can, and they split up. After a few hours of hunting, Ron screams and the others rush to his side and find he has been shot in the head, with the gun also shooting out the window of Donna's Mercedes. Ann takes Ron back to the cabin, where he is absolutely furious even though the injury is not serious. Ron asks whether Leslie shot him, but she insists she did not. Ron takes several pain pills and washes it down with scotch, which forces Ann and Leslie to hold his mouth open and induce vomiting, despite fierce opposition from Ron himself.

The others discuss who shot Ron, and Tom creates a minor panic when he suggests perhaps an outsider is hunting them. Ann takes Leslie aside and says she knows who shot Ron, and a few minutes later Leslie admits to the group that she was the shooter, even though Ann knows this is not the case. A park ranger arrives and interrogates Leslie, implying that the accident is the result of her femininity. Leslie knows that she is a good hunter, but goes along with the ranger's sexist implications in order to appease him. Later, a bandaged Ron repeatedly berates Leslie, prompting Ann to tell Tom she saw him shoot Ron, and insist he come forward. Tom admits he shot Ron, and that Leslie covered for him because he did not have his hunting license, which could have resulted in a $25,000 fine and possible prison time. Ron is impressed with Leslie, whom he calls a "stand-up guy". The episode ends with a get well party for Ron, where Ann is unimpressed with Andy's neck being covered in hickeys, and the whole party is horrified by Ron's head wound.

== Production ==
"Hunting Trip" was written by Daniel J. Goor and directed by series co-creator Greg Daniels. The episode introduced a romantic subplot between the characters Andy and April which continued throughout the second season and into the third. Series co-creator Michael Schur said the pairing was not previously planned, but grew when it was discovered during the filming of "Hunting Trip" that actors Aubrey Plaza and Chris Pratt had strong comedic chemistry together. However, Schur also said the idea to pair them together in "Hunting Trip" stemmed in part from a line Plaza improvised in the first season finale "Rock Show", when Andy explained his style of music and April replied that she completely understood him. Schur said, "At the time, it was this little nothing, throwaway thing, but when we watched it, we thought there might be something there."

During a November 2009 panel at the Paley Center for Media in New York City, Plaza said, "You're going to see more scenes with Andy and April. There could be a love connection for them." Daniels said some of his favorite moments from the series were in "Hunting Trip" and he particularly loved the "interpersonal stuff" between Andy and April, who he described as "two characters that you didn't know had any interest in one another". Pratt specifically sought to make Plaza laugh during their scene together and was ultimately successful. He told Daniels before filming, "I'm gonna get something out of her." "Hunting Trip" included a scene in which Leslie tells the state trooper multiple reasons or excuses for why she apparently shot Ron, all of which were edited together in a series of jump cuts. The technique has been commonly used throughout the Parks and Recreation series to condense multiple takes of improvisation from Poehler.

== Reception ==
I could literally watch Andy and April for a full half-hour. Their pairing was amazing, and might I add, very naturalistic. It didn't feel like they were just two quirky characters, I felt like they were really interacting on a sweet and real level.

— Matt Fowler, IGN

In its original American broadcast on November 19, 2009, "Hunting Trip" was seen by 4.61 million viewers, according to Nielsen Media Research. "Hunting Trip" drew a 2.0 rating/6 share among viewers aged between 18 and 49. It constituted about a five percent drop in viewership from the previous week's episode, "The Camel", which itself was a five percent drop from the previous episode, "Ron and Tammy". The episode received generally positive reviews, with several particularly praising the subplot between Aubrey Plaza and Chris Pratt. Reviewers also praised the continued developed of the Leslie Knope character, who proves to be intelligent and capable in "Hunting Trip", rather than the clueless protagonist she appeared to be in earlier episodes. In 2011, New York magazine writer called it "one of the breakout episodes that saw the show finding its momentum and figuring out how to transfer the dynamic outside of the office".

Alan Sepinwall of The Star-Ledger said "Hunting Trip" was not as funny as the previous episode, "The Camel", but that it included excellent physical comedy like Ron's refusal to throw up, and Andy's piggyback rides throughout Pawnee town hall. Sepinwall also praised Leslie's intelligence and savvy, which he said differentiates the show from Greg Daniels' other show, The Office and its protagonist Michael Scott. IGN writer Matt Fowler particularly praised the pairing of Aubrey Plaza and Chris Pratt, which he called simultaneously funny, naturalistic and sweet. Fowler said the main hunting plot was funny, but "I'm not a huge fan of horrific personal injury as a vehicle for humor". Steve Heisler of The A.V. Club said he liked the episode, but that the main hunting subplot was messy because there was too much action involving too many supporting cast members. Heisler said the Andy and April subplot was more effective. Slate magazine writer Jonah Weiner praised "Hunting Trip", especially the scene in which the characters become convinced they are being stalked by the Predator, the alien antagonist from the 1987 film of the same name. Weiner called it a "detour into an inspired absurdity that tugs against and tweaks the show's bureaucratic backdrop". Time magazine television critic James Poniewozik said "Hunting Trip" demonstrated how far Leslie Knope had developed since the first season. Poniewozik praised the "ultra-deadpan" pairing of Andy and April, which he said was another in a continued line of "interesting combinations for its side players". Steve Penner of The Portsmouth Herald said the sequence of Poehler's statements to the park trooper was "worthy of her absolutely best SNL impressions".

== DVD release ==
"Hunting Trip", along with the other 23 second season episodes of Parks and Recreation, was released on a four-disc DVD set in the United States on November 30, 2010. The DVD also included deleted scenes from each episode. It also included a commentary track for "Hunting Trip" featuring Amy Poehler, Nick Offerman, Aziz Ansari, Rashida Jones, Chris Pratt, Jim O'Heir, Retta, Aubrey Plaza, Michael Schur and Greg Daniels. "Hunting Trip" was also included in the DVD box-set for the sixth season of The Office.
