= Shot in the Dark (album) =

Studio album by Great White
- Released: August 1986
- Recorded: June & December 1985, March 1986
- Studio: Total Access (Redondo Beach, California)
- Length: 35:16
- Labels: Telegraph/Greenworld; Capitol
- Producers: Wyn Davis, Alan Niven

Great White chronology
Great White (1984)	Shot in the Dark (1986)	Once Bitten (1987)

Singles from Shot in the Dark
- 1. "Face the Day" Released: 1986; 2. "Waiting for Love" Released: 1986; 3. "Run Away" Released: 1986

Professional ratings
Review scores
Source	Rating
AllMusic	2.5/5 stars
Collector's Guide to Heavy Metal	4/10
Kerrang!	4/5 stars
The Rolling Stone Album Guide	1.5/5 stars

Shot in the Dark is the second studio album by American rock band Great White, released in 1986. It was originally released by Telegraph Records and distributed by Greenworld Entertainment. Later that same year it was picked up and re-issued by Capitol Records. The original issue featured a different intro to "She Shakes Me" (which was titled "Shake Me"), a different recording entirely of the song "Run Away", and a different mix of the several tracks. Great White's music in this album shows the transition from the pure heavy metal of the first album to a more blues-influenced style of heavy metal, paying homage to the great rock bands of the 1970s, like Led Zeppelin and AC/DC. This was the first album to feature drummer Audie Desbrow.

The album features one of the band's first well-known hits, a cover of The Angels song "Face the Day", as well as a cover of The Spencer Davis Group song "Gimme Some Lovin'"

The re-mastered CD release was on the Razor & Tie label and was remastered by Steve Hoffman.

== Critical reception ==
In a contemporary review for Billboard, published on June 21, 1986, the album was praised as "solid heavy metal without the bombast." The publication highly commended the quartet's "muscular playing" and "sleek backing vocals," concluding that the tracks achieved an "added sweep from crisp production" provided by Wyn Davis.

== Track listing ==
Side one

1. "She Shakes Me" (Mark Kendall, Jack Russell, Alan Niven) – 3:25
2. "What Do You Do" (Michael Lardie, Russell, Kendall) – 4:13
3. "Face the Day" (John Brewster, Bernard "Doc" Neeson, Rick Brewster) – 5:21 (The Angels cover)
4. "Gimme Some Lovin'" (Steve Winwood, Spencer Davis, Mervyn "Muff" Winwood) – 3:52 (The Spencer Davis Group cover)

Side two

5. "Shot in the Dark" (Kendall, Niven) – 4:52
6. "Is Anybody There" (Russell, Jerry Lynn Williams) – 4:57
7. "Run Away" (Williams, Niven) – 4:18
8. "Waiting for Love" (Williams, Kendall, Niven) – 4:19

Japanese CD edition bonus track

9. "Red House" (Jimi Hendrix) – 8:46

== Personnel ==
=== Great White ===
- Jack Russell – lead vocals
- Mark Kendall – lead and rhythm guitar, backing vocals
- Lorne Black – bass
- Audie Desbrow – drums

=== Additional musicians ===
- Michael Lardie – keyboards, backing vocals, engineer
- Jim Lang – keyboards
- Tyana Parr, Donald Ducksworth – backing vocals

=== Production ===
- Wyn Davis – producer, engineer
- Alan Niven – producer on "Face the Day"
- Eddie Schreyer – mastering

== Charts ==
Chart (1986)	Peak position
US Billboard 200	82
