= Gordon Hyatt =

American writer and television producer

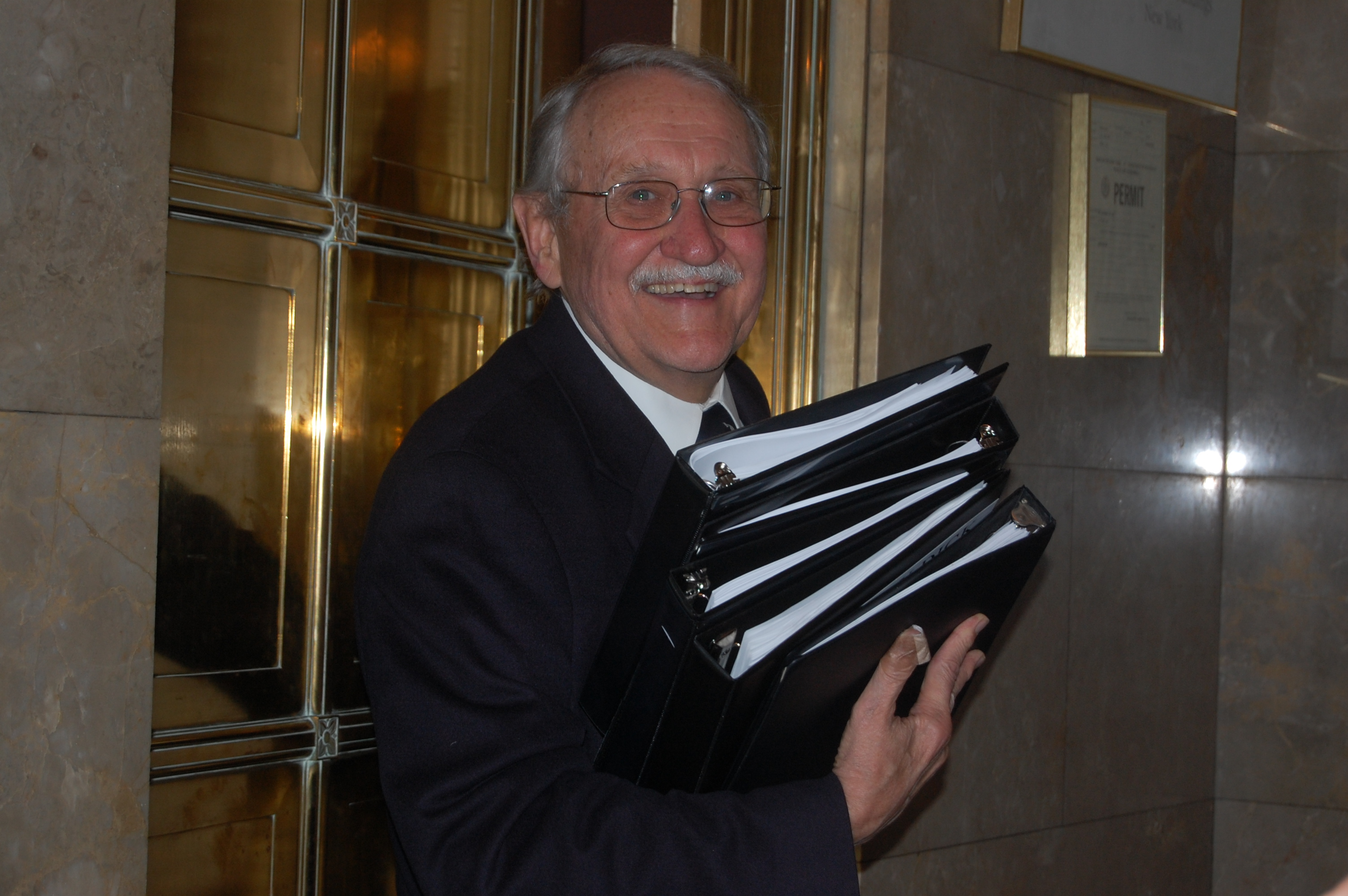
- Hyatt on October 15, 2012
- Born: Massachusetts, US
- Citizenship: United States
- Occupations: Television producer, writer
- Spouse: Carole Hyatt
- Children: Ariel Hyatt

Gordon Hyatt is an American writer and television producer. Hyatt is most well known for his work writing and producing CBS television documentaries, but has also been involved with public broadcasting as well as various civic and public service activities.

== Personal life and education ==
Gordon Hyatt is the son of Mr. and Mrs. S. G. Hyatt of Lee, Massachusetts. Hyatt attended Lee High School for secondary education, and attended Boston University from 1952 to 1956, where he received a Bachelor of Fine Arts degree magna cum laude in theatre and drama criticism.

He is married to author Carole Hyatt, and they have one daughter, Ariel. Gordon and Carole live in New York City and Stockbridge, Massachusetts. The conservatory of their Stockbridge home has been featured in New England Home magazine for its striking gothic revival architecture and design.

== Career ==
=== Early work in theatre ===
While in college, Hyatt became the technical director for the Berkshire Playhouse in Stockbridge, Massachusetts. After graduating, he worked as a stage manager for a New York City revival of The Iceman Cometh, a play by American playwright Eugene O'Neill, starring Jason Robards, at the Circle in the Square Theatre.

=== Documentary producer ===
In 1961, Hyatt began writing and producing documentaries for WCBS-TV, the CBS flagship television station in New York City. His critically praised 1961 film Our Vanishing Legacy is cited as the first prime time broadcast advocating historical preservation efforts in New York City.

In 1962, Hyatt worked with reporter Robert Trout to produce a documentary on mansions and residential architecture in Manhattan. Titled La Vie Elegante, the film featured the homes of Joseph Pulitzer, Leonard Jerome, Henry Villard and Otto Hermann Kahn. Later Hyatt produced and wrote A Question of Values, reporting on the evolution of the luxury apartment in Manhattan. He also worked with Trout on the 1964 documentary Reflections on the Fair, a critical review of the 1964 New York World's Fair focusing on four different pavilions.

Further production work with CBS included work with journalist Mike Wallace writing and producing critically lauded documentaries on pop art and op art, two major forms of modern art in the 1960s. Hyatt wrote an article for the Columbia Journalism Review regarding this experience.

Many of Hyatt's other CBS documentaries focused on the culture, history and future of New York City, including architecture, the modern art scene, and residential trends.

From 1974 to 1976, Hyatt was the executive producer of The 51st State, a WNET a weekly television news series focusing on New York City. The series was critically praised, and in 1976 he received a New York Emmy Award for this work.

At the end of the 1970s, Hyatt produced, wrote and directed a documentary film titled Sadat's Eternal Egypt featuring Egyptian president Anwar Sadat and correspondent Walter Cronkite.

Notable production work continued into the 1980s, with the 1988 PBS broadcast of Into the Mainstream, a half-hour biographical documentary of Ivonne Mosquera, a young blind girl from Venezuela learning to cope with life in Manhattan as well as similarly aged children with sight.

Hyatt continued producing into the 1990s, producing a WNET special on energy conservation titled Smart Choices and a TLC educational program about Mark Twain's Huckleberry Finn.

== Other activities ==
As a result of his CBS films encouraging historical preservation in New York City, Hyatt was elected as secretary of the Municipal Art Society from 1973 to 1982. While serving, he traveled on the 1976 Landmarks Special train to Washington, D.C. along with Jacqueline Kennedy Onassis, writer Brendan Gill, and several hundred protesters who successfully demonstrated in support of the Landmarks Law, which the Supreme Court subsequently upheld, defeating the plans of a developer who wanted to demolish Grand Central Terminal.

In 1980, Hyatt was appointed to the Art Commission of the City of New York by mayor Ed Koch. While on the commission, he initiated a major restoration of the Governor's Room in New York City Hall. After completing his term, he served as president and as secretary of the Associates of the Art Commission.

As project director celebrating the 150th Anniversary of the publication of Moby-Dick, Hyatt produced a gala benefit at Ozawa Hall at Tanglewood on October 13, 2001, hosted by Peter Jennings and featuring Sam Waterston, Ossie Davis, Fritz Weaver, Tina Packer and Edward Herrmann performing excerpts from the novel. For the Nathaniel Hawthorne bicentennial celebrations in 2004, Hyatt compiled Hawthorne Revisited, a collection of essays covering Hawthorne's life, career and literary reputation. He also directed a Hawthorne exhibition at the Lenox Library and produced "Hawthorne Revisited'" on October 9, 2004, which was a gala at Ozawa Hall featuring Mike Wallace, Jane Fonda, David Strathairn and Marisa Tomei.

In October 2012, Hyatt conceived and produced "Celebrating Moby-Dick," a South Street Seaport Museum benefit performance featuring actors Matthew Broderick, Jonathan Epstein and John Douglas Thompson representing characters in Herman Melville's novel with narration by author and historian Nathaniel Philbrick.

Hyatt served on the Chesterwood Council, an organization dedicated to the preservation of Chesterwood, the estate and studio of American sculptor Daniel Chester French. At Chesterwood, he produced the 75th anniversary celebration of the Lincoln Memorial, with a Tanglewood concert presenting Aaron Copland's Lincoln Portrait. Hyatt also serves along with his wife Carole as a board member of Shakespeare & Company, a theatre company located in Lenox, Massachusetts.

== Awards and honors ==
Hyatt's 1966 documentary about photographer John Albok, titled John Albok's New York, won a CINE Golden Eagle award, was nominated for a New York Emmy, and was a finalist for the Martin Luther King Jr. Film Festival.

In 2006, the Institute of Classical Architecture & Classical America and the New York Preservation Archive Project sponsored a film series featuring a selection of six of Hyatt's films, honoring his contributions to the studies of 1960s-era New York City.
