= Willie Basse =

American hard rock vocalist, bassist (1956–2018)

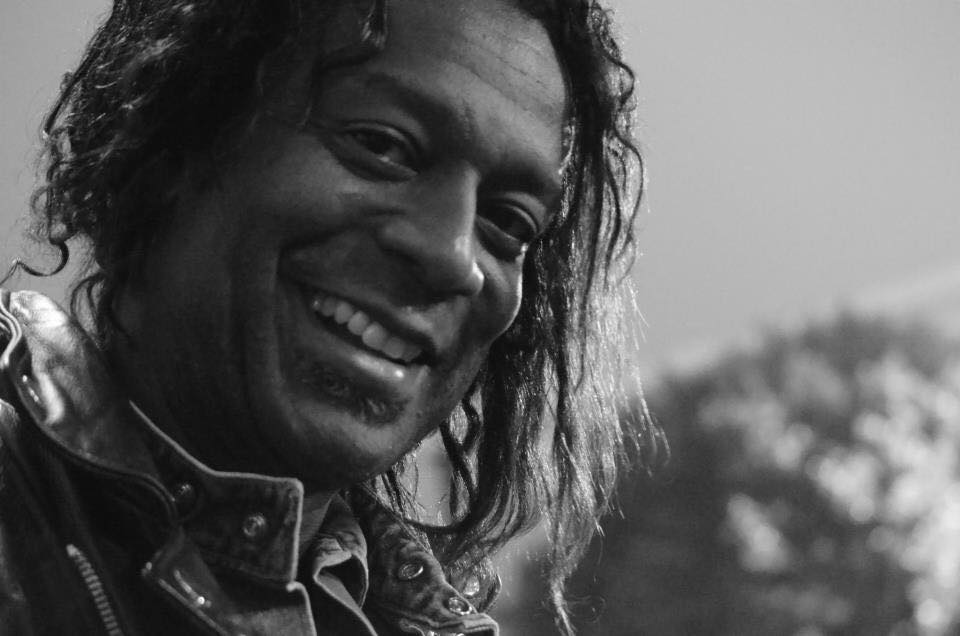

Background information
- Born: August 6, 1956; Odessa, Texas, United States
- Died: October 28, 2018 (aged 62)
- Genres: Hard rock, heavy metal
- Occupations: Musician, songwriter, producer, engineer, actor
- Instruments: Vocals, bass, guitar, drums
- Label: New Empire Media / Rocks Cool Records
- Formerly of: Black Sheep, Slash, Guns N' Roses, Snew, Scorpions, Kottak, Mr. Big, Racer X, Trampled Underfoot, Canned Heat, Lynch Mob
- Website: williebasse.com

Wilber Cornelius Rice, Jr. (August 6, 1956 – October 28, 2018), known by the stage name Willie Basse, was an American hard rock vocalist, bassist, music producer, engineer and songwriter. He was the frontman for Black Sheep, a 1980s metal band that featured a number of noteworthy musicians throughout its line-up changes. The last known line-up consisted of Basse on bass, Kyle Harrison and Brian Conroy on guitars, and James Kottak on drums. Other members included Slash, Paul Gilbert, Randy Castillo, Kurt James, Kevin Reye/Kevin Reyes (Micheal Bolton Band, Fortress, White Lie/TRIIX, Martial Law, Power Squadron, Network, Zodiac), Todd Devito, Ed DeGenaro, Kyle Harrison, Randy Meers, Mitch Perry and Patrick Abbate. Kevin Reyes & Todd Devito performed on 1984 7 song demo, which was featured on KLOS 95.5 Local Licks show in late 1984. Popularity of the demo helped paved the way to a record deal with Enigma Records. In 1985, the band released a full-length album, "Trouble In The Streets", on William and Wesley Hein's Enigma Records for which Billboard Magazine noted Basse as the producer. Their EP "Sacrifice" was released on Quicksilver in 1999.

== Early career ==
Basse says he began performing at the age of five. From the age of 10 to 15, he says he received classical training as a member of the Texas Boys Choir in Fort Worth, Texas. TBC performed with Igor Stravinsky, Greg Smith (choir director) and Burl Ives who were both on the Columbia label. TBC's performances with Smith and Ives received Grammy Awards in 1966 and 1968. "A Time Of Waking", an award-winning documentary about the choir's principles and work ethic, premiered in 1969. The choir performed at Carnegie Hall, St. Patrick's Cathedral (Manhattan) and Radio City Music Hall.

By 1976, Basse had moved from Fort Worth to Los Angeles where he is said to have met Record Plant founder, Gary Kellgren. According to his bio, Basse toured and recorded with Buddy Miles and later worked with Andy Johns, whom he met through Kellgren. Known for hosting wild parties at his North Hollywood rehearsal studio, he labeled his rock and roll lifestyle the "Sunset Strip Era". Many of those stories are recounted in the "Tales From The Sunset Strip" podcasts. According to Basse, his office and printing press even supplied flyers to Poison, Warrant, Tuff, Jade, Bang Tango, Pretty Boy Floyd during that time.

== Other projects ==
Basse has worn many hats during his career. He has worked as an audio engineer & producer, a corporate C.E.O, studio owner, and actor who played the part of a studio engineer in "The One Where Eddie Moves In" episode of Friends, also known as the "Smelly Cat" episode. As an officer and member of the Jimi Hendrix Foundation, a charitable organization, Basse has a three-fold task. In March 2015, he became the Resource Committee's VP of Marketing and Celebrity Spokesperson and for several years has played with The Gypsy Experience, a legacy band sponsored by the foundation. Other charity work includes Cruefest and The Skylar Neil Foundation, as well as Feed America – Now and Rock For Recovery. Basse is a past member of Snew and he has worked with George Lynch, Slash, Stephen Stills, James Kottak, Paul Gilbert, Rob Grill, Kevin Reye/Kevin Reyes, Kyle Harrison, JK Northrup, Jeff Pilson, Vinnie Appice, Carmine Appice and Canned Heat.

== Discography ==
- 1968 Texas Boys Choir, "The Glory of Gabrieli", Columbia Sony/BMG (#78762), 1st, 2nd Alto
- 1985 Black Sheep, "Trouble" in the Streets", Enigma (#72071), Artist
- 1997 Terry Ilous, "Cage", Fyco Records, Engineer
- 1998 Finis Tasby, "Jump Children", Evidence Music/Delta Groove, Engineer
- 1999 Black Sheep, "II Sacrifice", Rock's Cool Records (#07772), Artist/Producer/Engineer
- 1999 Canned Heat, "Boogie 2000", Ruf Records (#45327), Engineer
- Canned Heat, "Let's Work Together", Target TV Commercial, Engineer
- 2001 Frank Goldwasser, "Bluju", Delta Groove Productions, Engineer
- 2007 Terry Ilous, "Here and Gone", Fyco Records, Engineer
- 2008 Willie Basse, "The Money Grind", New Empire Media, Inc (#67026), Artist/Engineer
- 2010 Willie Basse, "Break Away", Rock's Cool Music Publishing, New Empire Media, Inc. Artist/Engineer/Co-Producer with Andy Johns
- 2010 Willie Basse, "Which Side R/U On?", New Empire Media, Inc., Artist/Engineer/Producer
- 2012 Willie Basse, "Someone Like U", New Empire Media, Inc. , Artist/Engineer/Producer
- 2012 Snew, "What's It To Ya", Hydrant Records Japan, Bass
- 2013 Willie Basse, "Stop! (In the Name of Love)", New Empire Media, Inc. , Artist
- 2013 Willie Basse, "Tears Are Falling", Rock's Cool Records, Artist/Producer
