= Carole Hyatt =

- Occupations: Author career development professional motivational speaker
- Spouse: Gordon Hyatt
- Children: Ariel Hyatt
- Writing career
- Language: English
- Website: www.carolehyatt.org

Carole Hyatt is an American author and career development professional. She is known for authoring several books and for developing the Leadership Forum, a program to provide leadership guidance and advice for women in executive or entrepreneurial business roles.

== Personal life ==
Carole Hyatt is married to television producer Gordon Hyatt whom she met while they were both working at CBS in New York City. Gordon and Carole have one daughter, Ariel. Carole and Gordon live in New York City and Stockbridge, Massachusetts. The conservatory in their Massachusetts home has been featured in New England Home magazine for its striking gothic revival architecture.

== Career ==
Hyatt originally started working with women in executive and entrepreneurial positions when she formed the market and social behavior research company Hyatt Esserman Research Associates with business partner June Esserman. The research focused on children and most of the staff were women. When Esserman died in 1982, Carole sold Hyatt Esserman Research Associates and began to focus full-time on career development for women. She has led workshops and been a keynote speaker across Europe, Asia, and the Americas.

=== Author ===
Carole Hyatt has written several books geared towards helping women reach professional success, including the best sellers When Smart People Fail: Rebuilding Yourself for Success and The Woman's Selling Game, both of which have generally received critical success.

When Smart People Fail was co-written with film producer Linda Gottlieb and was originally published in 1987. In describing the process that led to the publication of the book and referring to the death of June Esserman, Chicago Tribune writer Darlene Gavron stated, "To illustrate that failure can be a step toward success, Gottlieb and coauthor Carole Hyatt, 51, draw on interviews with 176 "veterans" of personal and career setbacks. ... It's a process Gottlieb and coauthor Hyatt have experienced firsthand. Fear of failure caused Hyatt to sell a successful New York marketing firm after her partner died."

In reviewing When Smart People Fail, career coach Lorna Kellogg stated that the book is "both informative and practical" and praised the way that the book confronts American taboos related to success and failure.

Hyatt's book The Woman's Selling Game, a career guide primarily intended for self-employed and entrepreneurial women, was similarly well-received, with a Kirkus critic stating that the advice contained within the book is "[set] forth in a dear, relaxed, generally persuasive manner." The book reached best seller status in the United States and was also published and widely distributed in Japan and Thailand.

In 1999, McGraw-Hill Ryerson released a revised and updated version of the book called The New Woman's Selling Game.

=== The Leadership Forum ===
Carole Hyatt developed the Leadership Forum, a career development initiative for women. Through the Forum, Hyatt hosts career development workshops and events focused on improving career strategies and leadership qualities for women in senior positions in various fields. Hyatt's most well-known workshop is called Getting to Next. Author Lynette Lewis, who considers Hyatt her mentor, cites attending a Getting to Next workshop as instrumental in her finding success as a businesswoman working in New York City.

The development of the Leadership Forum and of Hyatt's career working with women in leadership roles was profiled in Pamela Ryckman's recent book Stiletto Network: Inside the Women's Power Circles That Are Changing the Face of Business.

As of 2013, Hyatt has made Leadership Forum speaking appearances in over forty countries.

=== Mission: Getting to Next ===
In 2013, Hyatt founded Mission: Getting to Next, a non-profit organization that has established a program that brings together both civilian and military women who are in a transitional period in their lives. In establishing a network of support, retiring military servicewomen are able to apply the skills and leadership of the service to a new civilian career path. Dozens have successfully completed the program.

== Notable media appearances ==
In January 2002, Carole and her daughter Ariel were featured on The Oprah Winfrey Show, where they discussed the challenge of balancing family life and business for hardworking parents.

Carole has also appeared on the Today Show, Good Morning America, and CNN.

== Works ==
Year	Title
1979	The Woman's Selling Game: How to Sell Yourself — and Anything Else: Published by Warner Books
1980	Women and Work: Honest Answers to Real Questions: Published by Warner Books
1987	When Smart People Fail: Rebuilding Yourself for Success: Published by Simon & Schuster; Co-written with Linda Gottlieb; Re-published by Penguin Books in 1988; Revised and updated version published by Penguin Books in 1993
1989	キャリアパワー: Translated title: Career Power; Translation by Sakayori Noriko; Published in Japan by Waseda Shobo
1992	Shifting Gears: How to Master Career Change and Find the Work That's Right for You: Published by Fireside Books
1995	Lifetime Employability: How to Become Indispensable: Published by MasterMedia
1999	The Woman's New Selling Game: How to Sell Yourself — and Anything Else: Published by McGraw-Hill Ryerson; Revised and updated edition of the book originally released in 1979
