= Christmas Scandal =

- Parks and Recreation episode
- Episode no.: Season 2 Episode 12
- Directed by: Randall Einhorn
- Written by: Michael Schur
- Original air date: December 10, 2009

Guest appearances
- Louis C.K. as Dave Sanderson; Mo Collins as Joan Callamezzo; Jay Jackson as Perd Hapley; Jim O'Heir as Jerry Gergich; Pamela Reed as Marlene Griggs-Knope; Phil Reeves as Paul Iaresco; Retta as Donna Meagle; Kevin Symons as Bill Dexhart; Gillian Vigman as Alexa Softcastle; Jonathan Goldstein as Donnie

Episode chronology
← Previous "Tom's Divorce"	Next → "The Set Up"
- Parks and Recreation season 2

"Christmas Scandal" is the 12th episode of the second season of the American comedy television series Parks and Recreation, and the eighteenth overall episode of the series. It originally aired on NBC in the United States on December 10, 2009. In the episode, a meeting with a disgraced councilman puts Leslie in the middle of a sex scandal that forces her to hide from the press.

The episode was written by series co-creator Michael Schur and was directed by Randall Einhorn. "Christmas Scandal" marked the last of a string of guest appearances by stand-up comedian Louis C.K. as Dave Sanderson, Leslie's police officer boyfriend.

According to Nielsen Media Research, "Christmas Scandal" was seen by 5.62 million households, the highest viewership of the season. The episode received generally positive reviews, although some commentators felt the central story risked becoming too busy and chaotic.

== Plot ==
The parks department performs in the annual Pawnee City Government Follies that riffs local politics, including one sketch that skewers Councilman Bill Dexhart, who was recently discovered to be involved in many bizarre sex scandals. Leslie is later asked to meet Dexhart at a restaurant, where she learns the sketch was accidentally accurate about another bizarre sex scandal that has not been made public. After assuring Dexhart that it was merely a coincidence, Leslie discovers that the local tabloid, The Pawnee Sun, has taken pictures of their meeting and is reporting that Leslie is Dexhart's new mistress.

The speculation about Dexhart and Leslie quickly spins out of control, upsetting Leslie because it is distracting her from overseeing the Christmas village that she set up in Lot 48. Ron decides to give Leslie the day off to lie low and distributes her daily duties among the rest of the staff. Everyone is amazed how much Leslie does by herself each day and the entire group struggles to complete their tasks. Leslie has lunch with Dave, who reveals that his unit in the US Army Reserve has been called up to active duty in San Diego for a year to eighteen months, and he invites Leslie to join him since he has fallen in love with her. Leslie confides to Ann that she is considering the move, as the treatment of her in the media has soured her on Pawnee.

The local show "Pawnee Today" digs up an old video of Leslie shaking hands with Dexhart and overanalyzes every aspect of the short clip. Ann brings Dexhart to her home, where Ann and Leslie demand he clear Leslie's name. Dexhart refuses because the fake scandal is so docile compared to his real transgressions that it is actually positive press for him. Soon after, Ann is horrified to discover that a news crew secretly followed Dexhart to her home and took a photograph of the meeting, resulting in speculation that Ann is Leslie's lesbian lover in a three-way relationship with Dexhart. A furious Leslie schedules an appearance on "Pawnee Today" to clear her name once and for all. On the show, host Joan Callamezzo surprises Leslie by bringing out Dexhart, who tries to prove their affair by claiming that Leslie has a mole on her buttocks. To finally end the scandal, Leslie pulls down her pants on live television and moons Callamezzo. Since there is no mole, Dexhart is forced to admit that he fabricated the sex scandal.

Over dinner, Leslie tells Dave that she will not move to San Diego with him, as her life is in Pawnee. Dave, although sad, understands her choice and the two split up amicably. At Pawnee's tree lighting ceremony, Leslie is congratulated by everyone, including Leslie's mother Marlene, who is proud that her daughter successfully fought off the media. Leslie returns to work the next day much to Ron's immense relief, as he could barely handle just a portion of her daily duties. Everyone is visibly glad that Leslie is back.

In a B plot, April asks Andy what to get her gay boyfriend for Christmas. All of Andy's ideas are well-meaning but dumb, although it seems that April is just happy to talk with him. To thank Andy, she gets him a Reggie Wayne jersey for Christmas. Meanwhile, Mark tells Tom that he intends to get Ann a new computer bag for Christmas, but Tom tells him that he should get diamonds. In the end, he gives her the computer bag after all while Ann gives him Pacers tickets. He then gives her a second gift, telling her she does not have to go to the game, to which Ann happily accepts.

== Production ==
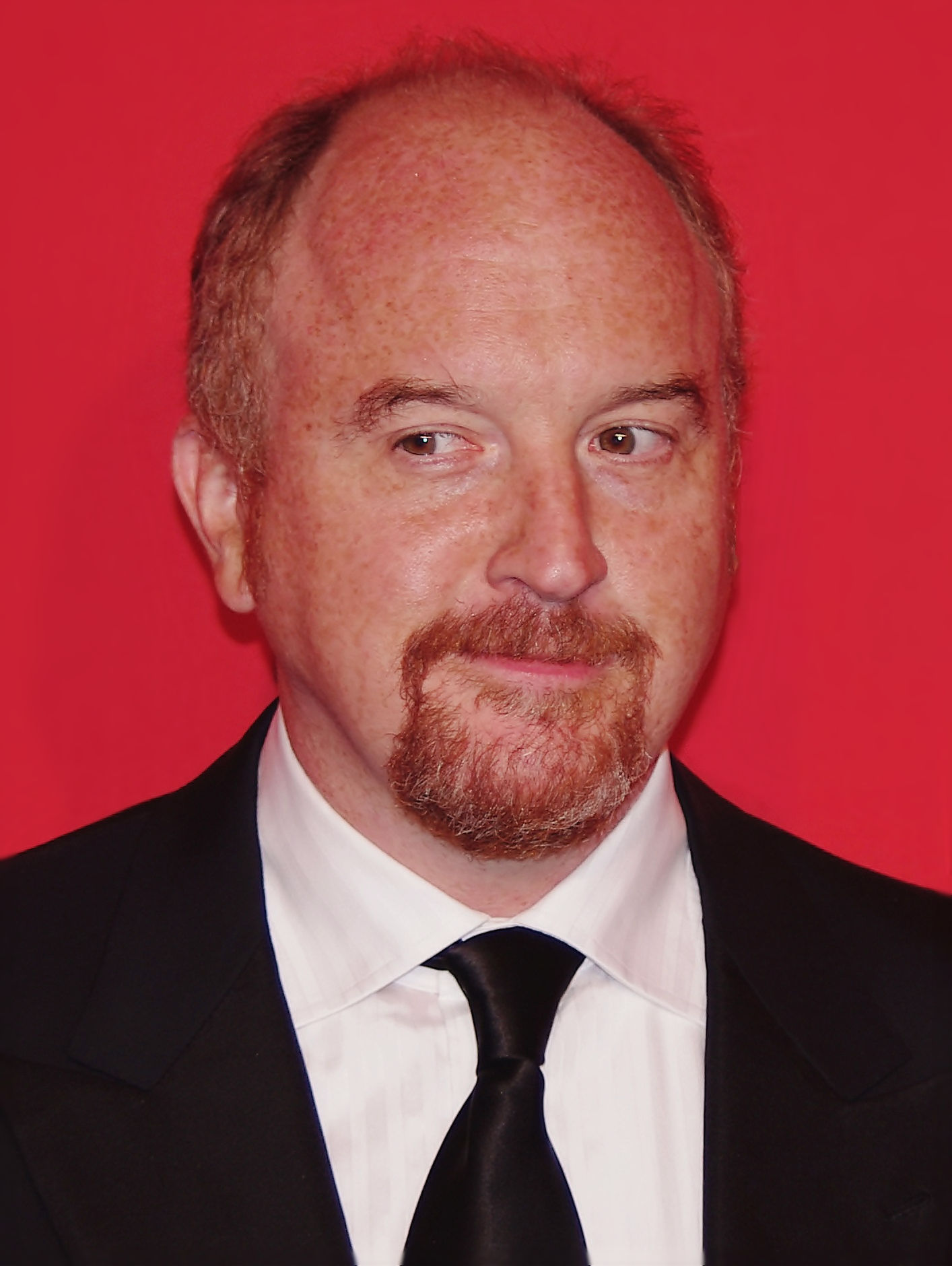
Stand-up comedian Louis C.K. made his second to last guest appearances as Officer Dave Sanderson in "Christmas Scandal".

"Christmas Scandal" was written by series co-founder Michael Schur and directed by Randall Einhorn. The episode featured the last of a string of guest performances by stand-up comedian Louis C.K., who reprised his recurring role as Dave Sanderson, Leslie's police officer boyfriend. Louis C.K. left the show to devote more time to his own upcoming series, Louie, which was to air in early 2010. Louis C.K. was widely praised for his brief stint on the show, where he adopts a deadpan, technical tone of voice far different from his usual comedy persona. Matt Fowler of IGN said, "Louis C.K., known for being a raucous, raunchy comic, is almost frightening in his ability to play against his stage persona and give us a wonderfully caring, and deadpan, character".

"Christmas Scandal" also featured Kevin Symons as Pawnee Councilman Bill Dexhart. Dexhart was previously introduced in "Practice Date", where his sex scandals served as a parody of the real-life 2009 scandal of South Carolina Governor Mark Sanford, who publicly admitted to a long-time extramarital affair with an Argentinian woman. Jay Jackson also reprised his prior role as Perd Hapley, a Pawnee television news reporter. "Christmas Scandal" is the first episode to feature the former Pawnee pit location serving a legitimate town purpose. Filling a giant construction pit and turning it into a park had been a central plot-point of Parks and Recreation throughout the first season and the first half of the second season. The pit was filled in the episode "Kaboom", and the space is turned into the town's Winter Wonderland Christmas village in "Christmas Scandal". The Christmas village scenes were filmed in the same location as the past pit scenes in Van Nuys, a district of Los Angeles, California. During one scene, Ron expresses concern about dangerous raccoons at the Christmas village. This is a reference to a running gag, established from the series, that Pawnee has a terrible raccoon infestation problem.

== Cultural references ==
When April seeks gift ideas for her "gay boyfriend", Andy suggests a DVD of Brokeback Mountain, a 2005 film about a romance between two men in the American West. As a gift, Andy receives a jersey for Reggie Wayne, the wide receiver of the Indianapolis Colts. While discussing gifts, Tom tells Mark all women love diamonds, "even the super left-wing chicks who saw Blood Diamond", a 2006 film about diamonds mined in African war zones.

== Reception ==
In its original American broadcast on December 10, 2009, "Christmas Scandal" was seen by 5.62 million households, according to Nielsen Media Research. It was the highest rating of the season, and a 10 percent increase in viewership from the previous episode, "Tom's Divorce". "Christmas Scandal" drew a 2.3 rating/6 share among viewers aged between 18 and 49. Commentators said NBC may have been received a boost in the ratings due to the lack of competition from repeats on ABC on December 10; NBC shows The Office, Community, 30 Rock and The Jay Leno Show also saw rating jumps that night.

The episode received generally positive reviews. The A.V. Club writer Leonard Pierce said the story in "Christmas Scandal" was so busy that it risked running awry, but was kept together by a number of strong comedic moments and subplots. Pierce particularly enjoyed watching the parks department scrambling to do Leslie's work, and the chemistry between both April and Andy, and Leslie and Dave. Alan Sepinwall, television columnist with The Star-Ledger, said he "thoroughly enjoyed" the episode, especially the subplot of the parks department employees realizing how much work Leslie does due to her absence. However, he said way the sex scandal consumed the entire town and local media countered the central conceit of the series, "that Leslie treats her mundane, small-town civil service job as if it were a high-stakes national politics job, while everyone else sees their world for what it is". Matt Fowler of IGN said the episode was "a sweet and clever way to celebrate the holiday season", but that the media frenzy in "Christmas Scandal" was "a little out of place in an episode filled with a ton of subtler, character-building moments". Fowler said the parks department employees splitting up to do Leslie's work was "a great element" that helped develop Leslie's character.

== DVD release ==
"Christmas Scandal", along with the other 23 second-season episodes of Parks and Recreation, was released on a four-disc DVD set in the United States on November 30, 2010. The DVD included deleted scenes for each episode.
