= The Camel (Parks and Recreation) =

- Parks and Recreation episode
- Episode no.: Season 2 Episode 9
- Directed by: Millicent Shelton
- Written by: Rachel Axler
- Original air date: November 12, 2009

Guest appearances
- Katie Dippold as Woman in line; Andy Forrest as Kyle; Kirk Fox as Joe Fantringham; Doug Anthony Jones as Arnold; Stephanie McVay as Committee member; Jim O'Heir as Jerry Gergich; Phil Reeves as Paul Iaresco; Retta as Donna Meagle; Barry Sigismondi as Fire chief

Episode chronology
← Previous "Ron and Tammy"	Next → "Hunting Trip"
- Parks and Recreation season 2

"The Camel" is the ninth episode of the second season of Parks and Recreation, and the fifteenth overall episode of the series. It originally aired on NBC in the United States on November 12, 2009. In the episode, Leslie and the parks department bicker as they work on a proposal for a new town hall mural, while Ron and Andy share an awkward moment at Andy's new shoe-shine job.

The episode was written by Rachel Axler and was directed by Millicent Shelton. The title refers to the figure of speech that a camel is a "horse made by a committee", and refers to the final mural proposed by the parks department. "The Camel" included references to several Indiana celebrities, including Greg Kinnear, John Mellencamp, Larry Bird, Michael Jackson and David Letterman, all of whom have a place in the mural representing Leonardo da Vinci's The Last Supper.

Stand-up comedian Kirk Fox made a guest appearance as Joe, from the Pawnee sewage department. According to Nielsen Media Research, "The Camel" was seen by 4.67 million viewers, a drop from the previous week. The episode received generally positive reviews, with particular praise for the Ron and Andy subplot, and the jokes involving Jerry's "murinal".

== Plot ==
The Pawnee council decides it will replace the town hall's "Spirit of Pawnee" mural, which has been repeatedly vandalized because of its racist overtones. When each Pawnee department is asked to propose a new mural, Leslie becomes determined for the parks department to win, especially after she is taunted by "Sewage" Joe in the sewer department. Everyone in the parks department is told to come up with a possible mural. Tom pays a local artist to make a painting for him, and he is initially unsatisfied with the result, a colorful abstract painting. When presenting it to the staff, however, he suddenly experiences his first emotional reaction to a work of art. Ann, who acknowledges a lack of creative talent, presents a rendering of a park that is widely panned by the others. April presents a dark and bizarre piece made of garbage she found in a dumpster. Donna presents a version of The Last Supper with famous people from Indiana. Jerry presents a beautiful pointillist photomosaic of city hall, but everyone laughs at him and dismisses his entry when he accidentally calls his mural a "murinal". Leslie proposes a picture of a historic Pawnee bakery fire, which she thinks will win because it is dark and depressing.

When the parks department casts votes for the best mural, they each vote for their own artwork. As a compromise, Leslie creates a mural using pieces of everybody's artwork, but the result is an ugly and confusing mess. Leslie enlists the help of Mark, who draws a bland but skillful sketch of an old man feeding pigeons in the park. Mark himself admits the sketch is dull, but claims it will win because it has mass appeal. Nobody in the parks department likes it except Ron, but Leslie insists on entering it so they will win, much to everybody's disappointment. While waiting to present the sketch, Leslie sees how much fun other departments had in making their mural, and she decides to enter the parks department's original mural after all. The town council committee are confused by the proposal, but the parks department have fun presenting it and break into laughter. In the end, the town decides not to spend any money on a new mural and simply renames the old one "The Diversity Express". The parks department is nevertheless proud of their work, which they hang in their conference room; Ron also hangs Mark's sketch in his office.

In a B plot, Andy is doing well in his new job as the Pawnee shoeshiner, and Ron pays for a shine. Ron is impressed when Andy actually eases the pain from his bunion, and he later purposely scuffs his shoe so he can get a second shine. Andy is initially flattered, but starts to grow uncomfortable when Ron returns for a third shoeshine. This time, Ron makes an involuntary noise that sounds like a sexual moan, seriously embarrassing both men. After a day of avoiding each other, Ron and Andy discuss the noise and decide it would be best to simply pretend it never happened.

== Production ==
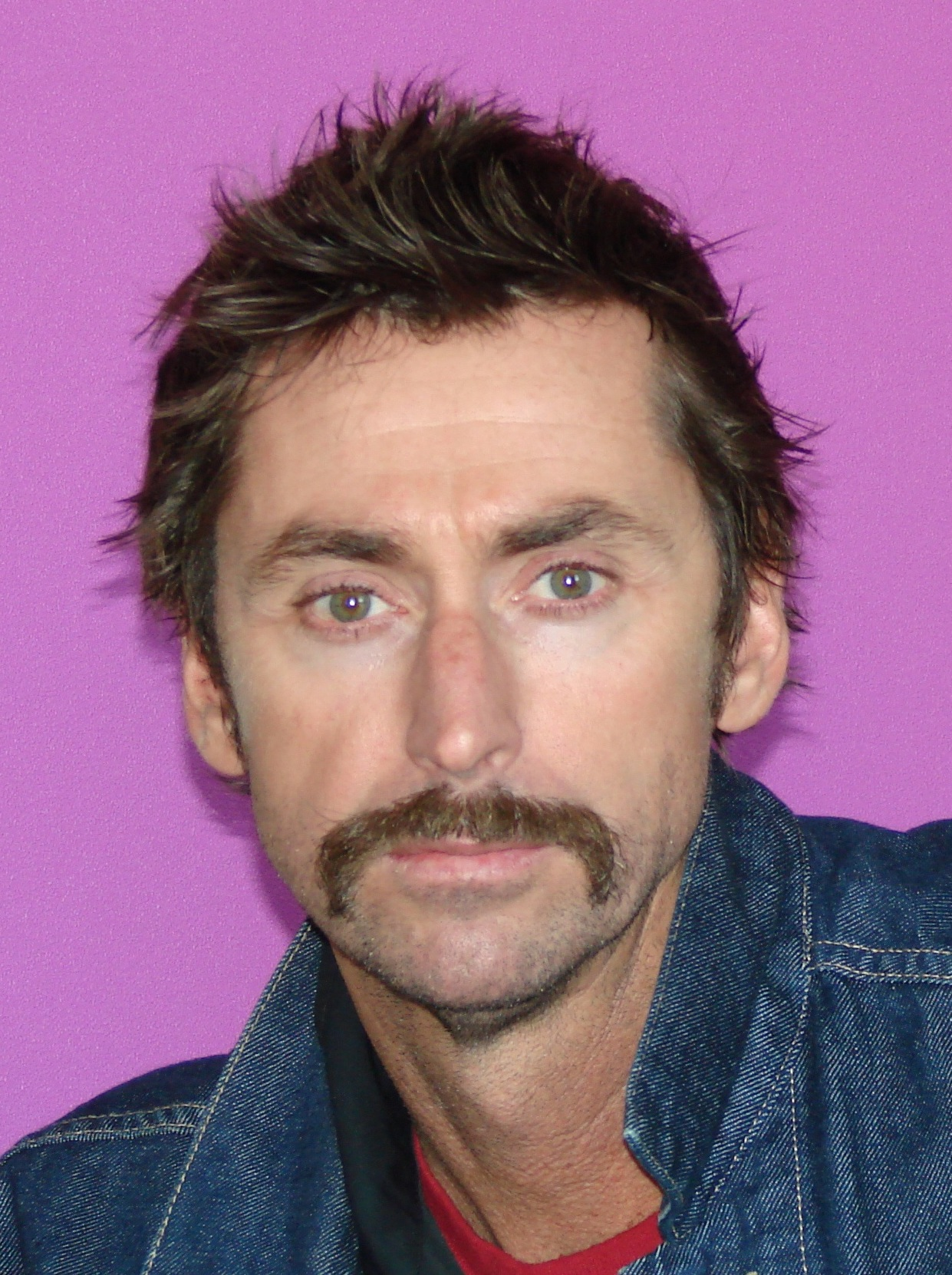
Stand-up comedian Kirk Fox made a guest appearance in "The Camel".

"The Camel" was written by Rachel Axler and directed by Millicent Shelton. It derives its title from the figure of speech that a camel is "a horse made by a committee". When the parks department puts together a mural proposal using elements of six different pieces of art, which Mark refers to in the episode as a camel. The episode features a guest appearance by stand-up comedian Kirk Fox as Joe, Leslie's nemesis from the Pawnee sewer department. Within a week of the episode's original broadcast, a deleted scene from "The Camel" was made available on the official Parks and Recreation website. In the 90-second clip, Ann tries to get out of helping with the mural, April looks through a dumpster for inspiration and Ron defends "cookie cutter art" by saying, "There's nothing wrong with a cookie cutter. You know what you get with a cookie cutter? Perfectly shaped cookies!"

== Cultural references ==
Leslie indicates she had a dream involving American actress Gina Gershon. For her mural, Donna proposes a recreation of Leonardo da Vinci's painting The Last Supper with Indiana natives in place of the apostles. Actor Greg Kinnear was chosen to replace Jesus, with the Apostles replaced by John Mellencamp, Larry Bird, Michael Jackson, David Letterman and a NASCAR race car, among others. Jerry presents for his mural a work of pointillism, a style of painting in which small distinct dots of color create the impression of a wider image. When proposing her somber mural, Leslie claims tragedy often succeeds in awards, and specifically cites the Academy Awards which honor the film industry. As an example, Leslie uses The English Patient, the 1996 Best Picture winner during the 69th Academy Awards. Upon first receiving his painting, Tom says, "It looks like a lizard puking up Skittles", a reference to the multi-colored candies. Leslie, upon the idea of putting the best parts of each design into a new mural, says it is like having Michelangelo, Andy Warhol, Jackson Pollock and Jim Davis do one painting. When Mark tries to get out of helping with the mural, he uses the excuse, "I was gonna go to Arby's and watch Frontline", a reference to a fast food restaurant chain and a Public Broadcasting Service public affairs program. Ron names his bunion Paul, after the mythological lumberjack Paul Bunyan.

== Reception ==
In its original American broadcast on November 12, 2009, "The Camel" was seen by 4.67 million viewers, according to Nielsen Media Research. It drew a 2.1 rating/6 share among viewers aged between 18 and 49, about a five percent drop from the previous week's episode, "Ron and Tammy". The episode received generally positive reviews. Matt Fowler of IGN said "The Camel" was a particularly funny episode, and that the parks department's collaboration on the mural allowed "each character being able to instill their own level of brand-specific insanity into the mix". Fowler also praised the sewer department jokes, the "murinal" scene involving Jerry and the fact that no department ended up winning the mural contest, which Fowler called a commentary on "the futility of local government in their attempts to accomplish anything". The Star-Ledger television columnist Alan Sepinwall declared "The Camel" one of the episodes he would suggest to newcomers seeking to become familiar with Parks and Recreation. Sepinwall said the Ron and Andy subplot "made me laugh as hard as I have in a very long time", and said the episode had a good mix of funny, sweet and ridiculous moments, and said the ensemble cast was starting to work extremely well together.

[The Ron and Andy scenes] nearly caused a medical crisis in the Sepinwall household, as it sent me into a laughing fit so extreme that I got a case of the hiccups so extreme I briefly became worried that my throat was closing up.

— Alan Sepinwall,
The Star-Ledger

The A.V. Club writer Leonard Pierce said the episode included great lines, strong personality-driven comedy and good character moments, specially Tom's emotional reaction to his painting. Pierce said the Andy and Ron subplot was "so well played that it threatens to usurp the mural storyline". Sandra Gonzalez particularly praised the "murinal" jokes about Jerry's mural, as well as Ron's claim that he ran a sheet metal factory when he was nine, and that "Child labor laws are ruining this country." Time magazine television critic James Poniewozik said make jokes connected in "The Camel", including the Andy shoeshine plot and the "unexpectedly glamorous" sewage department. But he particularly praised the character development in the main plot, in which "each in their own way sticks to the purity of their uniquely screwy ideas". Brad Sanders of the Indiana Daily Student praised the entire cast, particularly Offerman and Pratt, who he said provide the show's two best characters. Sanders said the fact that the episode included a "hilarious subplot" involving both of them "was more evidence that the writers have been listening to the fans".

GQ writer Dan Fierman said Parks and Recreation appeared to be "approaching early Simpsons-levels in its absurdity and comic pacing". He suggested this could be due to the use of Mike Scully, a veteran comic writer with the animated series, as a consulting producer on Parks and Recreation. In an article reflecting on the Parks and Recreation second season, which became critically acclaimed following poor season one reviews, Slate magazine writer Jonah Weiner said the plot of "The Camel" "can be read as something of a Season 2 mission statement". Weiner compared Leslie's decision to submit the quirky collage rather than the safer bet as reflective of the Parks and Recreation writing staff's apparent decision "to ride their zaniest whims rather than tamp them down for something more readily recognizable as a hit sitcom".

== DVD release ==
"The Camel", along with the other 23 second season episodes of Parks and Recreation, was released on a four-disc DVD set in the United States on November 30, 2010. The DVD included deleted scenes for each episode.
