= Tom's Divorce =

- Parks and Recreation episode
- Episode no.: Season 2 Episode 11
- Directed by: Troy Miller
- Written by: Harris Wittels
- Original air date: December 3, 2009

Guest appearances
- John Lee Ames as Criminal; James Ball as Phil; John Paul Burkhart as Pantomime Horse; Richard Dunn as 110-Year-Old Man; Evan O'Brien as The Waiter; Jim O'Heir as Jerry Gergich; Retta as Donna Meagle; David Gerard Robinson as Pimp; Cheryl Texiera as Sierra; Jama Williamson as Wendy Haverford

Episode chronology
← Previous "Hunting Trip"	Next → "Christmas Scandal"
- Parks and Recreation season 2

"Tom's Divorce" is the 11th episode of the second season of American comedy television series Parks and Recreation, and the seventeenth overall episode of the series. It originally aired on NBC in the United States on December 3, 2009. In the episode, Tom gets a divorce and Leslie tries to cheer him up, unaware it was a green card marriage. Meanwhile, Andy challenges Mark to a game of pool with the hopes of winning back Ann's affections.

The episode was written by Harris Wittels and was directed by Troy Miller. Although officially entitled "Tom's Divorce", it has also been referred to in some media reports as "The Fourth Floor" in reference to the pre-credits sequence in which Leslie visits the horrifying and grotesque fourth floor of the Pawnee Hall, a scene that was praised by television reviews.

According to Nielsen Media Research, "Tom's Divorce" was seen by 4.83 million viewers, an increase over the previous episode, "Hunting Trip". The episode received generally positive reviews, particularly for the development of Tom's character, although commentators voiced less praise for the subplot involving Ann, Mark and Andy.

== Plot ==
Ron sends Leslie to run an errand at the DMV in Pawnee Hall's fourth floor, a dark and unsettling place that includes probation offices and divorce filings. A reluctant and frightened Leslie navigates past reprobates and blood stains on the floor and spots Tom leaving the divorce office with his wife Wendy. Unaware that their relationship was a green card marriage to prevent Wendy from being deported back to Canada, Leslie later tries to comfort Tom, who insists he is fine. Nevertheless, Leslie persists in her efforts to cheer him up, in part by ordering a singing horse telegram to cheer him up. Ron, who knows about Tom's fake marriage, suggests Tom act sad so Leslie can feel like she cheered him up. When Leslie sets up a social event to cheer him up, Tom suggests a strip club, but Leslie follows Jerry's suggestion they go to the dinosaur-themed restaurant, Jurassic Fork.

The parks employees eat several dinosaur-themed entrees, served by a depressed waiter, they enjoy "Tyranna-Ceasar Salads" and "Surf and Turfasaurus". Tom seems so cheery that Leslie begins to suspect he is faking being sad. Ron pulls Tom aside and asks whether he could ask Wendy on a date once the divorce is finalized. Tom consents, but is visibly disappointed. Determined to cheer him up, Leslie agrees to compromise her morals and take Tom to his favorite strip club, the Glitter Factory. Leslie is horrified by the club and tries to encourage the strippers to change their lives. Ron is also uninterested in the strippers, but happily consumes the free breakfast buffet.

Tom remains depressed even after Leslie hires a stripper to give him a lap dance and "grind the sorrow out of him". A drunken Tom tells Leslie that Ron plans to ask out Wendy, prompting an angry reaction from her. When Tom passes out at the bar, they take him to Wendy's house, and Leslie is shocked to find she is on a date with another man. She storms out after expressing her disgust with Wendy and Ron. The next morning at work, Tom confesses to Leslie that it was a green card marriage, and that he only recently realized he really likes Wendy.

Meanwhile, Andy continues his efforts to break up the relationship between his ex-girlfriend Ann and her new boyfriend Mark. Andy challenges Mark to a game of pool with the hopes of hustling him, but Mark turns out to be an excellent player and wins multiple games. Mark and Andy make one final wager: if Andy wins, he gets Ann, but if Mark wins he has to leave them alone. Mark dominates the game but loses when he scratches on the 8 ball. Initially delighted, Andy becomes confused when Ann leaves with Mark anyway. The next day, he tells Mark and Ann he will no longer be bothering them, and says a final goodbye to Ann.

== Production and cultural references ==
"Tom's Divorce" was written by Harris Wittels and directed by Troy Miller. Although officially titled "Tom's Divorce", it was referred to in some media reports by the name "The Fourth Floor". Aziz Ansari said "Tom's Divorce" was his favorite episode of the series so far. He said, "It was really fun because there was some serious acting for me to do, compared to my usual dick jokes."

"Tom's Divorce" included several references to previous Parks and Recreation episodes. Tom and Wendy's green card marriage was first identified in the episode "Practice Date". During the final scenes of the episode "Greg Pikitis", Tom expresses sadness when Wendy mentions that the couple will eventually get a divorce, which set the scene for this film. Television reviewer Alan Sepinwall, television columnist with The Star-Ledger, said this allowed the show to humanize and further develop Tom's character. In certain shots in "Tom's Divorce", it appears the back of Ron's head is missing patches of hair. This is a reference to the previous episode, "Hunting Trip", in which he is accidentally shot in the back of the head while hunting. The episode also features scenes with Ron describing his admiration for strong women and his immense enjoyment of the strip club's complimentary breakfast. Both of these refers to the elements of Ron's character that were conveyed in the episode "Ron and Tammy", which involves Ron's romantic life and includes dialogue about his love of breakfast foods. Ron also identifies tennis player Steffi Graf and basketball player Sheryl Swoopes as ideal romantic partners. He previously declared Steffi Graf a "perfect ten" on his attractiveness scale in "Practice Date".

The song "Unskinny Bop", a 1990 single by the band Poison, plays during one of the strip club scenes. Leslie said Tom hides his emotions behind "a very thick layer of Axe body spray", a reference to the real-life male grooming product. The Parks department employees eat at a restaurant called Jurassic Fork, a reference to the Steven Spielberg dinosaur adventure film Jurassic Park, which was adapted from a novel of the same name by Michael Crichton. During one scene, Tom refers to Ron as "Rondoleezza Rice", a reference to former United States Secretary of State Condoleezza Rice. At the strip club, Leslie mistakenly refers to a stripper named Sierra by the name Seabiscuit, a champion thoroughbred racehorse. Reflecting on his marriage, Tom said, "At least we lasted longer than Avril Lavigne and that guy from Sum 41", a reference to the pop singer's short-lived marriage to Sum 41 guitarist Deryck Whibley. Tom says one of the strippers also works at Quiznos, a sandwich fast-food franchise; Tom says of her: "She's really nice to me here, but really mean to me at Quiznos." Andy said he has a T-shirt that is "literally priceless" because he was wearing it when he tackled American singer Eddie Vedder. When Ron was commenting on how well Tom was pretending to be sad about his divorce, he tells Tom, "Take it down a notch. You've already won your Oscar, DiCaprio," which is a reference to the Academy Awards and the actor Leonardo DiCaprio.

== Reception ==
The sign of a lasting comedy show is when it's able to maintain its tone when venturing into darker territory. Though it's not a guaranteed laugh-a-minute place to take a show, tackling some of these bigger character issues pays off huge in the long-term like that old adage states: Comedy equals tragedy plus time.

— Steve Heisler,
The A.V. Club

On its original American broadcast on December 3, 2009, "Tom's Divorce" was seen by 4.83 million households, according to Nielsen Media Research. This amounted to a five percent ratings increase over the previous week's episode, "Hunting Trip". "Tom's Divorce" drew a 2.1 rating/6 share among viewers aged between 18 and 49. The episode received generally positive reviews, particularly for the development of Tom's character and the "fourth floor" pre-credits sequence, although commentators voiced less praise for the subplot involving Ann, Mark and Andy. Steve Heisler of The A.V. Club said the episode addressed two of the show's more downbeat stories (Tom's divorce and Andy's failed attempts to woo Ann) but "managed to do so by keeping its plucky, upbeat sense of humor intact". Heisler praised the growth of Tom's character and the fourth floor joke, which he said "started with yet another delicious chapter in behind-the-scenes Pawnee lore".

Time magazine television critic James Poniewozik said Ansari did "an excellent job" at showing a new side to Tom, and complimented the staging of the fourth floor sequence. Alan Sepinwall of The Star-Ledger said "Tom's Divorce" was "by design, more melancholy" than previous Parks and Recreation episodes, but served to develop Tom's character and proved Aziz Ansari "could tone it down and play a quieter, sadder Tom for once". Sepinwall said the Mark, Ann and Andy subplot was not as funny as in previous episodes. Entertainment Weekly writer Sandra Gonzalez said she had been awaiting a storyline centering on Tom, and said the episode "makes us love the show more". However, she said Andy's continued obsession with Ann was growing tiresome and expressed hope his character should go in a new direction. Matt Fowler of IGN said the episode further added to the strong character development that has been consistent throughout the show's second season. Fowler also enjoyed the frightening portrayal of the fourth floor, which he said helps establish Pawnee as "a place where both the engrossingly real and the entertainingly surreal can co-exist". GQ writer Dan Fierman praised the episode, particularly Ron's character and the singing telegram "divorce horse".

== DVD release ==
"Tom's Divorce", along with the other 23 second season episodes of Parks and Recreation, was released on a four-disc DVD set in the United States on November 30, 2010. The DVD included deleted scenes for each episode.
