= Snew =

American hard rock band

SNEW
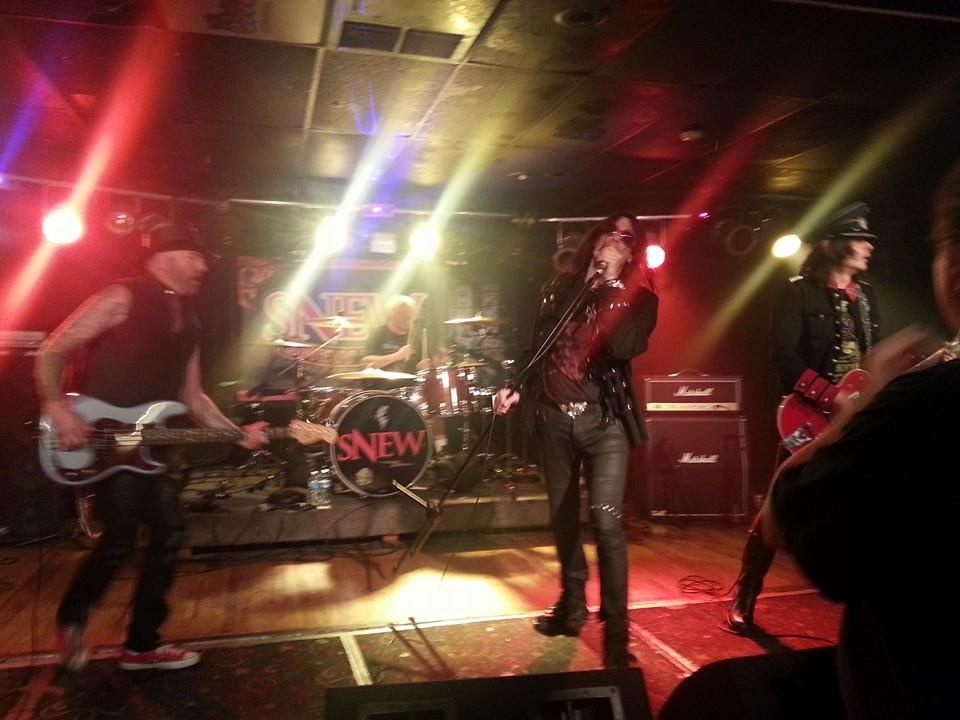
- SNEW performing in May 2014

Background information
- Origin: Los Angeles, California, U.S.
- Genres: Hard rock
- Years active: 2005–present
- Label: Maman Music Co
- Members: Curtis Don Vito; Andy Lux; Mark Ohrenberger; Lenny Spickle; Kelly Magee
- Past members: Willie Basse; Paul Ill; Cat Tate
- Website: snewyou.com

SNEW is an American hard rock band from Los Angeles, California. The quintet consists of founders Curtis Don Vito (lead singer), Andy Lux (lead guitar), and Mark Ohrenberger (drums), along with Lenny Spickle (rhythm guitar), and Kelly Magee (bass). Formed in 2005, SNEW has released three albums and has sustained a steady tour schedule along the West Coast along with occasional major festival appearances. The band's influences are varied, consisting of Motörhead, Alice Cooper, Ramones, Kiss, AC/DC and MC5.

The band features a number of notable past and present members in bass players Willie Basse, Paul Ill and Kelly Magee. Basse was a pioneer in the 80s LA metal scene, where he was the frontman in the influential band Black Sheep, which consisted of Slash, James Kottak, George Lynch. Paul Gilbert, DJ Ashba and Randy Castillo – at various times. According to Slash in his best selling Slash, "I joined a band called BLACK SHEEP with WILLIE BASSE which was a 'RITE OF PASSAGE' for a succession of talented musicians. Willie Basse is a great frontman.". L.A. session musician Paul Ill has played with Bill Ward, Christina Aguilera, Alicia Keys, P!nk and Celine Dion among many others. In 1997, Ill toured with Bill Ward's solo band in support of When the Bough Breaks. SNEW's current bass player, Kelly Magee, was previously a part of the L.A.-based hard rock band Warrior in their Mark III lineup.

== Recordings ==
SNEW has released three albums. Their debut album, entitled SNEW You, was released its in 2008, We Do What We Want in 2010, and What's It To Ya in 2012. All three albums were produced by Bobby Owsinski, as was their most recent 2014 single "Thunderdog," the first with the expanded lineup featuring Spickle on rhythm guitar. In 2009, the band collaborated on a version of Deep Purple's "Highway Star" with noted fusion guitarist Allan Holdsworth, which was released as a single.

The band has always worked with a who's who of rock craftsman. We Do What We Want (recorded at The Village Recorders (studio) in West Los Angeles, California) was engineered and mixed by Grammy winner Ed Cherney. What's It To Ya (recorded at Total Access Recording in Redondo Beach, California) was engineered and mixed by the Ken Scott (The Beatles, David Bowie, Elton John, Supertramp). The band has also utilized the skills of a number of rock photographers, with the photos for the SNEW You album cover taken by Robert M. Knight, the second album photos taken by Edward Colver, and the third by Neil Zlozower.

The group has deliberately eschewed record labels, preferring DIY in order to maintain creative control, although What's It To Ya was released in Japan through Hydrant Records and distributed by EMI Music Japan. The video for "Pull My Stinger" can be seen on Japan's WOWOW music channel Unusual for a band with no label ties, SNEW ran advertising spots during That Metal Show in 2010, 2012 and 2013.

== Airplay and Press ==
The band's albums and songs have received a great deal of attention on hard rock and metal-oriented radio, both terrestrial and online. SNEW You was named one of the top 10 albums of 2008 on SleazeRoxx.com, as well as on HardRockHideout.com, HardRadio.com, and iLike2Rock.net. The album also hit #1 on the Dirty Thirty of High Octane Radio and #2 on the Internet Radio Syndicate. "We Do What We Want" was named Best Rock Song by Pirate Radio of the Treasure Coast, and the band was named a Top 10 artist by military service men and women on the Dave Rabbit Show on Armed Forces Radio.

The album What's It To Ya was the #2 best seller on CD Baby's hard rock chart for the month of August 2012, while WSCA 106.7 FM also named the song the third most played during that year, with "Thunderdog" appearing as the second most played song in 2014. "Pull My Stinger," "Release The Beast," and "I Got A Rocket" have also consistently appeared in the Top 20 charts of Number 1 Music during that same year as well. In all, the band has garnered airplay on more than 200 radio stations.

SNEW's songs have been often heard on television during sporting events, with NHL Hockey using "Heavy Water," Major League Baseball using "Pick Up The Ball" and "Knock It Out Of The Park," and NFL Sunday using "Shinebox" at various points during the national broadcasts of different games, primarily on Fox Sports (United States).

The band's songs have also been used in motion picture soundtracks, with three songs used in the 2014 documentary "Inside Metal: The Pioneers of Los Angeles Hard Rock and Metal," a project on which Don Vito also served as associate producer and editor. "Stand Up High" was used in the 2014 sci-fi horror film Extraterrestrial.

The band has been mentioned in international publications such as Classic Rock (magazine) (UK), Popular 1 Magazine (Spain), Burrn! magazine (Japan) and Rock Hard (magazine) (Germany). SNEW has been reviewed by magazines more than 70 times worldwide and made the cover of Buzzbin magazine.

== Appearances ==
SNEW has toured across the United States on a limited basis, but has appeared most frequently on the West Coast. The band has continued to make regular appearances in their home town at Hollywood hotspots like The Viper Room, The Whisky a Go Go, Cat Club, and the Key Club. In 2012, SNEW played Rocklahoma, the annual 3-day rock festival in Pryor, Oklahoma. In 2012, Ex-W.A.S.P. lead guitarist Chris Holmes (musician) joined SNEW on-stage at The Steel Pit in Tujunga, CA.

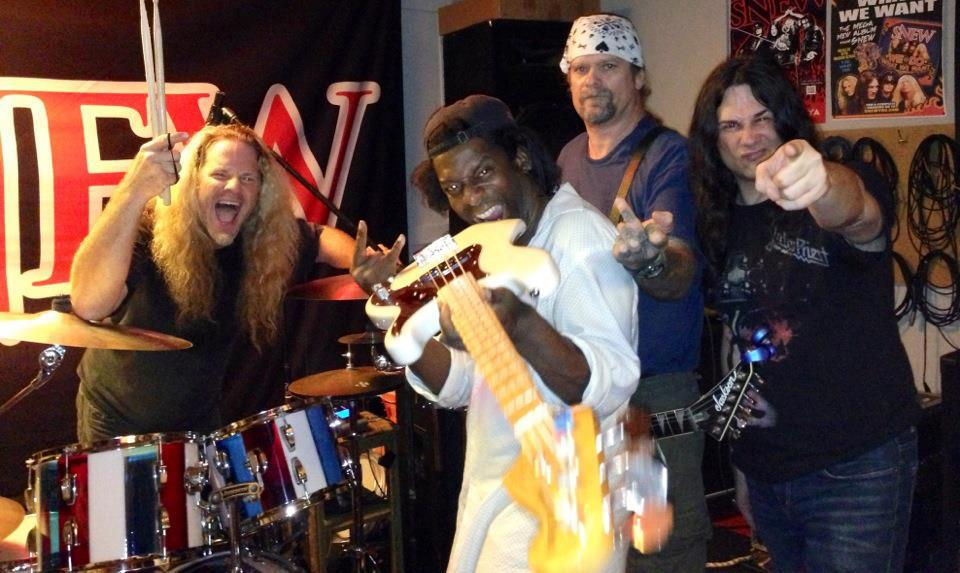
Ex-W.A.S.P. lead guitarist Chris Holmes (musician) with SNEW (2012).

In 2013 and into 2014, the band appeared in a self-produced show Live From The SNEWdio featuring the band in their personal studio along with featured guests. Each show featured one of the band's songs and a cover of a classic rock song. The show ran for 10 episodes and is currently on hiatus.

== Discography ==
ALBUMS

- SNEW You (2008)
- We Do What We Want (2010)
- What's It To Ya (2012)
- You've Got Some Nerve (2018)

SINGLES

- "Highway Star" with Allan Holdsworth (2009)
- "Pull My Stinger" (2012)
- "Thunderdog" (2014)
- "The Juice Of Power" (2015)
- "UR Freaking Me Out" (2018)
