= ...Twice Shy =

Studio album by Great White
- Released: April 12, 1989
- Recorded: 1989
- Studio: Total Access (Redondo Beach, California)
- Genres: Glam metal; hard rock
- Length: 49:24
- Label: Capitol
- Producers: Alan Niven, Michael Lardie

Great White chronology
| Once Bitten (1987) | ...Twice Shy (1989) | Hooked (1991) |

Singles from ...Twice Shy
- 1. "Once Bitten, Twice Shy" / "Slow Ride" Released: 1989; 2. "The Angel Song" / "Run Away" Released: 1989; 3. "Heart the Hunter" / "All Over Now" Released: 1989; 4. "House of Broken Love" / "Bitches and Other Women" Released: 1989; 5. "Mista Bone" / "Wasted Rock Ranger" Released: 1989

...Twice Shy is the fourth studio album by American rock band Great White. It was released in 1989 and contained the biggest hits of their career, a cover of Ian Hunter's "Once Bitten, Twice Shy" and "The Angel Song", which reached No. 5 and No. 30 on the Billboard Hot 100, respectively. Another single, "House of Broken Love", was inspired by the painful relationship break-ups that vocalist Jack Russell and guitarist Mark Kendall had recently gone through. The album was certified double platinum by the RIAA in September 1989. This is the first album to feature bassist Tony Montana.

== Critical reception ==
Professional ratings
Review scores
| Source | Rating |
|---|---|
| AllMusic | 4/5 stars |
| Robert Christgau | C |
| Collector's Guide to Heavy Metal | 4/10 |
| Stereo Review | Okay |

David Spodek, reviewer of RPM, complained about the lack of originality. As per him "the main problem is that the original material is missing that something special to distinguish it from the rest of the heavy metal crop, and that may result in getting lost in the crowd". As a result Spodek called it "just another heavy metal album" and regretfully stated that the best cut on the album is a cover of Ian Hunter's "Once Bitten, Twice Shy."

Allmusic rated the album 4 stars out of 5, saying it was the band's best effort and featured a good mix of "impressive originals" and carefully chosen cover songs.

== Album cover ==
The bodies of the ladies displayed on the album cover belong to models (from left to right): Bobbie Brown who also appeared in the video for "Once Bitten, Twice Shy" and Traci Martinson who was featured on the front cover of their previous album: Once Bitten.

== Track listing ==
=== Non-U.S. releases ===
All tracks are written by Mark Kendall, Jack Russell, Alan Niven, Michael Lardie, except where indicated.

| No. | Title | Writer(s) | Length |
|---|---|---|---|
| 1. | "Move It" | | 5:35 |
| 2. | "Heart the Hunter" | | 4:50 |
| 3. | "Hiway Nights" | | 6:00 |
| 4. | "The Angel Song" | Kendall, Niven | 4:51 |
| 5. | "Mista Bone" | Kendall, Niven, Audie Desbrow, Tony Montana | 5:10 |
| 6. | "Baby's on Fire" | Kendall, Russell, Niven, Lardie, Montana | 6:11 |
| 7. | "House of Broken Love" | Russell, Niven, Lardie | 5:58 |
| 8. | "She Only" | | 5:23 |
| 9. | "Once Bitten, Twice Shy" | Ian Hunter | 5:22 |
| 10. | "Wasted Rock Ranger" | Bradley "Porque" Baker | 3:06 |
| Total length: | | | 52:26 |

Japan & UK editions bonus tracks
| No. | Title | Writer(s) | Length |
|---|---|---|---|
| 10. | "Bitches and Other Women" (medley of The Rolling Stones' 'Bitch' and Foreigner's 'Women') | Mick Jagger, Keith Richards, Mick Jones | 4:46 |
| 11. | "Wasted Rock Ranger" | Brad Baker | 3:03 |
| Total length: | | | 60:15 |

Japan Remaster 2005 bonus track
| No. | Title | Length |
|---|---|---|
| 12. | "Slow Ride" | 3:53 |
| Total length: | | 64:08 |

=== U.S. releases ===
All tracks are written by Mark Kendall, Jack Russell, Alan Niven, Michael Lardie, except where indicated.

| No. | Title | Writer(s) | Length |
|---|---|---|---|
| 1. | "Move It" | | 5:35 |
| 2. | "Heart the Hunter" | | 4:50 |
| 3. | "Hiway Nights" | | 6:00 |
| 4. | "The Angel Song" | Kendall, Niven | 4:51 |
| 5. | "Mista Bone" | Kendall, Niven, Audie Desbrow, Tony Montana | 5:10 |
| 6. | "Baby's on Fire" | Kendall, Russell, Niven, Lardie, Montana | 6:11 |
| 7. | "House of Broken Love" | Russell, Niven, Lardie | 5:58 |
| 8. | "She Only" | | 5:23 |
| 9. | "Once Bitten, Twice Shy" | Ian Hunter | 5:22 |
| Total length: | | | 49:24 |

== Personnel ==
Great White

- Jack Russell – lead vocals
- Mark Kendall – guitar, backing vocals
- Michael Lardie – guitar, keyboards, backing vocals, producer, engineer, arrangements
- Tony Montana – bass
- Audie Desbrow – drums

Production

- Alan Niven – producer, arrangements
- Michael Lardie – producer
- Eddie Ashworth – engineer
- Melissa Sewell – assistant engineer
- George Marino – mastering

== Charts ==
=== Weekly charts ===
| Chart (1989) | Peak position |
|---|---|
| Canada Top Albums/CDs (RPM) | 22 |
| German Albums (Offizielle Top 100) | 41 |
| US Billboard 200 | 9 |

=== Year-end charts ===
| Chart (1989) | Position |
|---|---|
| US Billboard 200 | 31 |

== Certifications ==
| Region | Certification | Certified units/sales |
|---|---|---|
| Canada (Music Canada) | 2× Platinum | 200,000^{^} |
| United States (RIAA) | 2× Platinum | 2,000,000^{^} |
^{^} Shipments figures based on certification alone.

== ...Twice Shy / Live at the Marquee ==
Album cover

Capitol UK, Electrola West Germany released a limited-edition version of ...Twice Shy as a double CD and LP set. The second disc was titled Live at The Marquee, and included a full live album recorded on December 18, 1987.

=== Live at The Marquee track listing ===
1. "Shot in the Dark"
2. "What Do You Do"
3. "Gonna Getcha"
4. "Money (That's What I Want)"
5. "All Over Now"
6. "Is Anybody There?"
7. "Face the Day"
8. "Rock Me"
