= Bobby Owsinski =

American audio engineer, producer and author

Bobby Owsinski is an American audio engineer, producer, musician, and author based in Los Angeles.

He is best known as author of over 20 books in the field of music, music recording and social media, and audio engineering, especially in surround mixing with credits including Jimi Hendrix, The Who, Pantera, Weird Al Yankovic, Willie Nelson, Elvis Presley, Neil Young, Iron Maiden, The Ramones, and Chicago.

== Early life ==
Bobby Owsinski grew up in Minersville, Pennsylvania, where he played guitar and sang in regional cover bands throughout his high school and college years. Early success as a professional musician came as a keyboard player with The Other Side, touring along the East Coast and eventually recording one album for De-Lite/Polygram.

Wanting to learn more about production and arranging, Owsinski enrolled in Berklee College of Music where he studied composition and majored in guitar. After a brief time as a student, he was hired as an instructor in the school's then-new recording program, where he stayed for an additional year until moving to Los Angeles.

== Career ==
=== Audio production and engineering ===
Owsinski has worked on projects as an engineer, producer, writer, and arranger for music, commercials, television, and motion pictures. During his early years in Los Angeles he worked with many artists including Frank Zappa, The Byrds, and Lou Rawls among others. In the mid-90s he worked in the Southern California blues scene producing recordings for Willie Dixon, Joe Houston, and ex-Rolling Stone Mick Taylor. He was Taylor's music director for one tour.

Owsinski was a co-founder of music-production company Surround Associates. He was among the first sound engineers to mix music specifically for DVD surround sound, working on projects for artists including Jimi Hendrix, Elvis Presley, The Who, Iron Maiden, Ramones and Chicago.

He has consulted for a variety of music and audio-related companies including Alesis, Amek, IK Multimedia, Lexicon, Line 6, Neve, PreSonus, Shattered Music, TASCAM, United Entertainment Media, Waves Audio, and Yamaha.

He also spent time as an educator, starting with teaching and authoring various audio-related courses at Berklee College of Music, then moving on to Trebas Recording Institute and Nova Institute. Today he conducts guest lectures and presentations at colleges and universities around the world.

Owsinski has appeared on ABC News' 20/20 speaking about the 2012 Beyoncé Inauguration Ceremony controversy, on CNN's New Day, and other programs, podcasts, and radio shows. He has also been featured in artists in Sound on Sound, The Music Paper, Mix Magazine, EQ Magazine, among others.

Recent musical productions by Owsinski include Snew and Adrianna Marie and Her Groovecutters, with her album Double Crossing Blues reaching #2 on the Billboard Blues Charts.

=== Writing ===
Owsinski has written numerous magazine articles for trade publications including Billboard, EQ, The Hollywood Reporter, Mix, Electronic Musician, Grammy Magazine, Film & Video, Pro Sound News, Music Connection, and others. He has also written more than twenty books in the area of audio engineering and music production. His books outside of the music business include Social Media Promotion for Small Business and Entrepreneurs and the Cruise Vacation FAQ Book.

He maintains several of his own blogs and contributes to other notable industry blogs, most notably that of Forbes where he provides commentary on the new music business and music technology. Many of Owsinski's books have also been released in video format via Lynda.com, now known as LinkedIn Learning.

== Books ==
Owsinski has authored books on the subject of music and audio engineering since the 1990s, the following list reflects latest edition dates.

Audio-related books

- (2025) The Mixing Engineer's Handbook Sixth Edition (original first edition in 1999)
- (2024) The Mastering Engineer's Handbook Fifth Edition (original first edition in 2003)
- (2023) The Recording Engineer's Handbook Fifth Edition (original first edition in 2000)
- (2016) The Music Producer's Handbook Second Edition
- (2016) The Drum Recording Handbook Second Edition (with Dennis Moody)
- (2014) PreSonus StudioLive Official Handbook
- (2012) Abbey Road To Ziggy Stardust (with Ken Scott)
- (2012) Audio Mixing Bootcamp
- (2012) Audio Recording Basic Training
- (2011) The Studio Builder's Handbook (with Dennis Moody)
- (2010) Mixing And Mastering With T-RackS

Music books

- (2013) Deconstructed Hits Classic Rock Vol. 1
- (2013) Deconstructed Hits Modern Rock And Country
- (2013) Deconstructed Hits Modern Pop And Hip Hop
- (2011) Touring Musician's Handbook
- (2011) Ultimate Guitar Tone Handbook (with Rich Tozzoli)
- (2010) Musician's Video Handbook
- (2009) How To Make Your Band Sound Great
- (2009) The Studio Musician's Handbook (with Paul ILL)

Music business books

- (2017) Social Media Promotion For Musicians Second Edition
- (2016) Music 4.1: A Survival Guide For Making Music In The Internet Age Fourth Edition (original first edition in 2010)
- (2013) Music 3.0 Guide To Social Media

Books outside the music business

- (2016) The Cruise Vacation FAQ Book
- (2014) Social Media Promotion For Small Business And Entrepreneurs
