= Rock Me (Great White song) =

Single by Great White

from the album Once Bitten
- B-side: "Fast Road"
- Released: June 1987
- Recorded: 1987
- Studio: Total Access (Redondo Beach, California)
- Genre: Glam metal
- Length: 7:20
- Label: Capitol
- Songwriter(s): Mark Kendall, Jack Russell, Alan Niven, Michael Lardie
- Producer(s): Alan Niven, Mark Kendall and Michael Lardie

Great White singles chronology
"Face the Day" (1987)	"Rock Me" (1987)	"Save Your Love" (1987)

Music video
- "Rock Me" on YouTube

"Rock Me" is a song by American rock band Great White, released in June 1987, as the first single from their third studio album Once Bitten (1987). It was a breakout hit for the band and still receives significant airplay on Classic Rock Radio. The original version lasted over 7 minutes, with the radio and video versions being re-recorded to fit between 3 and 5 minutes. Rock Me was on the Billboard Hot 100 chart for 14 weeks, peaking at number 60 on September 26, 1987.

== Track listings ==
=== 7" single (US) ===
No.	Title	Writer(s)	Length
1.	"Rock Me (The Short of It)"	Mark Kendall, Alan Niven, Michael Lardie, Jack Russell	4:12
2.	"Fast Road"	Kendall, Russell, Niven, Lorne Black, Audie Desbrow, Lardie	3:58

=== 7" single (UK) ===
No.	Title	Length
1.	"Rock Me"	3:58
2.	"Fast Road"	3:32

=== 12" single (UK) ===
No.	Title	Length
1.	"Rock Me"	5:12
2.	"Fast Road"	3:39
3.	"Immigrant Song"	2:12
4.	"Rock and Roll"	3:47

=== Cassette single ===
No.	Title	Length
1.	"Rock Me (Video Version)"	4:08
2.	"What Do You Do (Live)"	3:39
3.	"Face The Day (Blues Remix)"	7:04

=== CD single ===
No.	Title	Length
1.	"Rock Me"	7:19
2.	"Face The Day (Extended Version)"	7:02

== Personnel ==
- Jack Russell – lead vocals
- Mark Kendall – lead guitar, backing vocals
- Michael Lardie – rhythm guitar, harmonica, backing vocals
- Lorne Black – bass, backing vocals
- Audie Desbrow – drums

== Charts ==
Chart (1987)	Peak position
US Billboard Hot 100	60
US Mainstream Rock (Billboard)	9
