= Once Bitten, Twice Shy =

1975 single by Ian Hunter

Single by Ian Hunter

from the album Ian Hunter
- B-side: "3,000 Miles from Here"
- Released: 4 April 1975
- Recorded: January–March 1975
- Studio: AIR (London)
- Genre: Rock and roll
- Length: 3:52
- Label: Columbia; Sony Music
- Songwriter: Ian Hunter
- Producers: Ian Hunter; Mick Ronson

Ian Hunter singles chronology
"Once Bitten, Twice Shy" (1975)	"Who Do You Love?" (1975)

"Once Bitten, Twice Shy" is a song written and recorded by Ian Hunter, released in 1975 as his debut solo single from his debut solo album Ian Hunter. The song reached No. 14 on the UK Singles Chart.

The song was included in the 2017 feature-length biographical documentary, and compilation soundtrack, entitled Beside Bowie: the Mick Ronson Story.

The song has been covered by the Angels, Shaun Cassidy, Eddie & the Hot Rods and Great White, among others.

== Great White cover ==
"Once Bitten, Twice Shy"

Single by Great White

from the album ...Twice Shy
- B-side: "Slow Ride"
- Released: May 1989
- Studio: Total Access (Redondo Beach, California)
- Genre: Pop metal; glam metal; hard rock
- Length: 5:24
- Label: Capitol
- Songwriter: Ian Hunter
- Producers: Alan Niven, Michael Lardie

Great White singles chronology
"Mista Bone" (1989)	"Once Bitten, Twice Shy" (1989)	"The Angel Song" (1989)

Music videos
- "Once Bitten, Twice Shy" on YouTube

"Once Bitten, Twice Shy" was covered in 1989 by American rock band Great White on their fourth album, ...Twice Shy. This version was also released as a single, which charted at No. 5 on the Billboard Hot 100, at No. 6 on the Mainstream Rock Tracks chart and again in the UK.

This version's video was placed on a New York Times list of the 15 Essential Hair-Metal Videos.

=== Critical reception ===
Billboard's reviewer came to conclusion that success of LP in its chart will be a "strong support" to single and "should place this boogieing rocker on a large number of playlists."

=== Charts ===
Chart (1989)	Peak position
Canada Top Singles (RPM)	11
UK Singles (Official Charts)	83
US Billboard Hot 100	5
US Mainstream Rock Airplay (Billboard)	6

=== Certifications ===
Region	Certification	Certified units/sales
United States (RIAA)	Gold	500,000^{^}
^{^} Shipments figures based on certification alone.

== Track listings ==
=== Ian Hunter 1975 single ===
1. "Once Bitten, Twice Shy" – 3:52
2. "3,000 Miles from Here" – 2:48

=== Great White 1989 single ===
1. "Once Bitten, Twice Shy" – 5:20
2. "Slow Ride" – 3:53
3. "Wasted Rock Ranger" (Cassette only)
