= Ron and Tammy =

- Parks and Recreation episode
- Episode no.: Season 2 Episode 8
- Directed by: Troy Miller
- Written by: Mike Scully
- Original air date: November 5, 2009

Guest appearances
- Jack Carter as Gus; Roger Eschbacher as Manager; Megan Mullally as Tammy Swanson; Jim O'Heir as Jerry Gergich; Retta as Donna Meagle

Episode chronology
← Previous "Greg Pikitis"	Next → "The Camel"
- Parks and Recreation season 2

"Ron and Tammy" is the eighth episode of the second season of Parks and Recreation, and the fourteenth overall episode of the series. It originally aired on NBC in the United States on November 5, 2009. In the episode, the library department tries to take control of a vacant lot where Leslie plans to build a park. Ron's ex-wife, one of Leslie's directors, sexually manipulates Ron to get what she wants. The episode was written by Mike Scully and directed by Troy Miller.

"Ron and Tammy" featured Megan Mullally, the real-life wife of Parks actor Nick Offerman, in a special guest appearance as Ron's ex-wife, Tammy, who appears in several other episodes in the following seasons. According to Nielsen Media Research, it was seen by 4.93 million household viewers; its rating of 2.2 was the season's highest to that point. "Ron and Tammy" received highly positive reviews and is widely considered one of the best Parks and Recreation episodes, with many commentators praising Offerman's performance. Tammy later returned for the third season sequel episode, "Ron & Tammy: Part Two" and several subsequent episodes.

== Plot ==
Andy takes over as the shoeshiner at the Pawnee town hall, replacing "Old Gus", who insults everybody during a farewell party. Later, Mark breaks the bad news to Leslie that the Pawnee library has placed a planning claim for Lot 48, which Leslie has been working to turn into a park. Leslie and the rest of the parks department express hatred for the library, which Leslie declares a "diabolical, ruthless bunch of bureaucrats", much to the confusion of Ann. Ron is particularly angry to learn his ex-wife Tammy, who he insists is evil incarnate, is the new library director.

Leslie decides to confront Tammy directly, only to find Tammy seems to be a friendly woman who instantly agrees to let Leslie have Lot 48 as a "professional courtesy". Impressed, Leslie brings Tammy to the parks department so she can talk to Ron and work out their differences. Tammy and an agitated Ron go off to have coffee, and Donna insists to Leslie that the arrangement is a mistake because the two act crazy when they are together. At a local diner, Ron and Tammy immediately start a very loud argument in front of the other patrons. Moments later, however, the two are publicly making out on the table in front of everyone. The two rush off to a motel, where they frantically remove their clothing before even entering the building.

Ann and her boyfriend Mark run into Andy, Ann's ex-boyfriend. Andy flirts with Ann in front of Mark, and openly admits he plans to win her back from him. Mark asks advice from Tom, who suggests Mark should take the high road (although Tom tells the documentary crew that he never takes the high road, but tells everyone else to do so, so there is more room for him on "the low road"). Mark tries to have a gentlemanly discussion with Andy, who continues to insist he loves Ann, pointing to the many photos he has of her around his shoeshine station. Finally, Ann confronts Andy and tells him to stop discussing her with Mark, as well as to remove her photos from the wall.

A cheery and singing Ron (who is wearing his "Tiger Woods" outfit, which is an outfit he wears after having sex) openly discusses the details of his sexual exploits with Tammy to an uncomfortable Leslie. Although she is initially pleased with the results of her meddling, Leslie soon realizes Tammy is using sex to manipulate Ron to give her control of Lot 48. Leslie confronts Tammy, who admits to the plot and brags that this is how the library operates. Leslie tries to get Ron to break up with Tammy, but he insists he cannot confront her without Leslie's help. The two go to the library, where Ron starts to cave in when Tammy flirts with him. Leslie tells Ron to do whatever will make him happy, even if it means giving up the lot. Ron, impressed that anyone would put his own needs before their own, decides instead to break up with Tammy and give the lot back to Leslie. After breaking the news to Tammy off-camera, he leaves the library with a push-pin stuck in his forehead, and part of his mustache missing, and he and Leslie flee the library. The two share a drink, where Leslie encourages Ron to insult Tammy.

== Production ==
If they had just cast another funny actress, there's a politeness where we wouldn't have gone as far. But since we have literally already been inside each other, well, we know the depths to which we can safely go.

— Nick Offerman, on the casting of Megan Mullally

"Ron and Tammy" was written by Mike Scully and directed by Troy Miller. The episode featured comedian and actress Megan Mullally in a guest appearance as Ron's ex-wife, Tammy. Mullally is the real-life wife of Nick Offerman, who plays Ron. Parks and Recreation co-creator Michael Schur conceived the idea for the story, and asked Offerman whether he and Mullally would be opposed to her playing such a terrible character. Offerman was extremely responsive to the idea. Mullally said she enjoyed the script, particularly the dialogue of Ron describing Tammy, more than Tammy's part herself. Offerman and Mullally improvised many of their on-screen fights, as well as the varied methods of unusual kissing between the two characters. During the diner scene, in which Ron and Tammy switch between violent fighting and passionate kissing, Offerman accidentally pulled a diner table out of the wall after placing Mullally on top of it and kissing her. The scene was used in the final episode. Offerman said of filming the diner scenes, "At the end of doing that for a few hours, we said, you know that feels like it was five weeks worth of really good therapy."

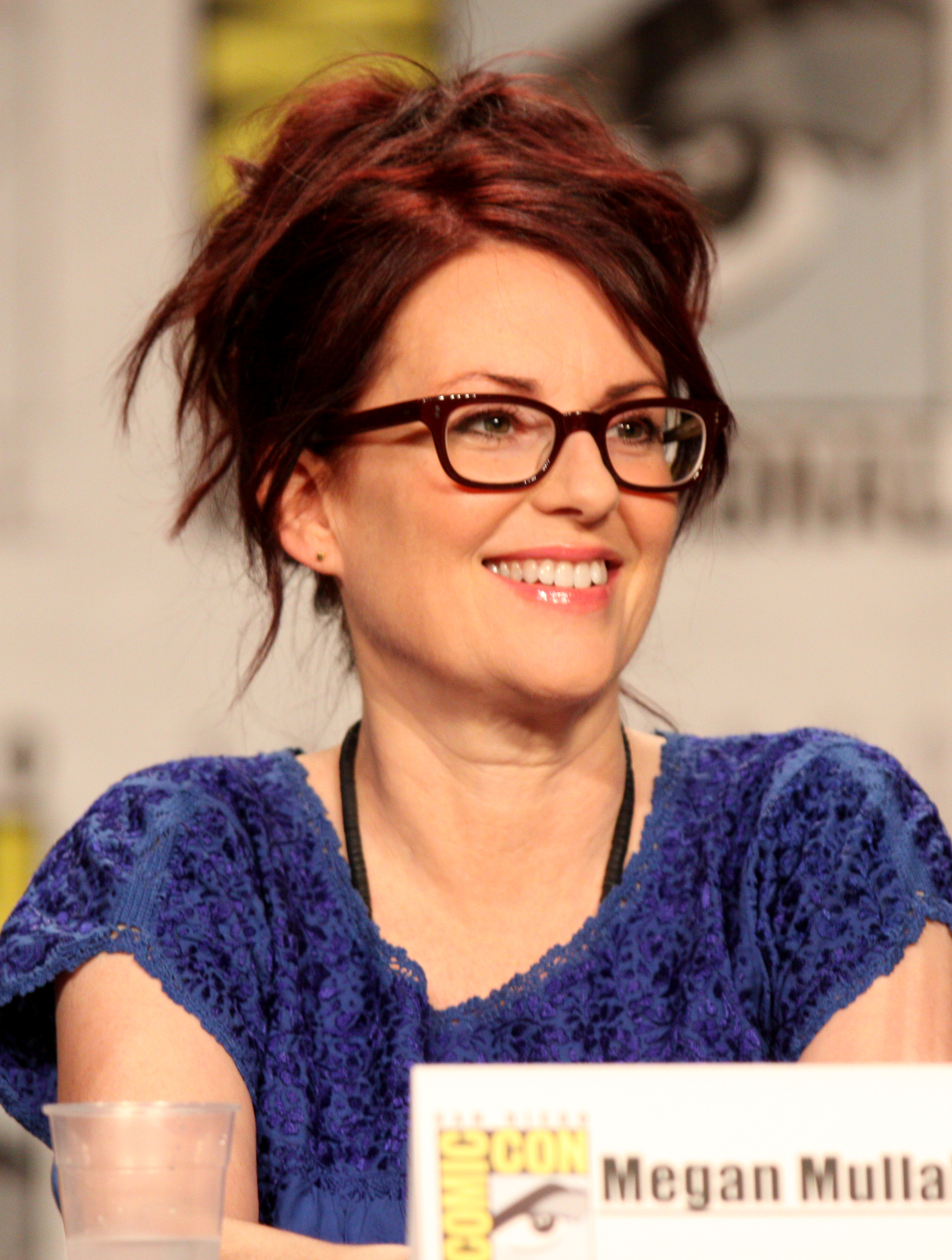
Megan Mullally appears as Tammy, ex-wife of Mullally's real-life husband Nick Offerman's character Ron, in the episode and would reprise the role in several more episodes.

During a scene with Ron and Tammy start stripping while running into a motel room, Mullally removed her top and appeared topless during filming. Mullally improvised the move and did not tell the crew she planned to do it. She said of filming the scene, "I didn't care, it was six in the morning, who cares, I didn't know anybody." Offerman said his favorite scene in the episode was the one in which Leslie tried to break up with Tammy for him. He particularly enjoyed the rapport between Poehler and Mullally, and said he "just wanted to pinch himself" to prevent from laughing. Ron talks about the stock photo on his wall of a brunette woman holding a plate of breakfast and how it symbolizes his favourite things, and how "today he got the real thing" after a naked Tammy made him breakfast. In the pilot episode of Parks and Recreation, a photo of retired basketball coach Bobby Knight is on the wall. When it had to be removed for legal reasons, Parks and Recreation Schur searched an image library for "things we thought Ron would like" and found the breakfast photo. Schur said he thought it was perfect for the character, and it inspired the dialogue in the episode. The character Tammy later returned for the third season sequel episode, "Ron & Tammy: Part Two".

Within a week of the episode's original broadcast, two deleted scenes from "Ron and Tammy" were made available on the official Parks and Recreation website. In the first two-minute-long clip, Ron describes Tammy to Leslie in increasingly horrible ways, and Leslie talks to Tammy about previous problems the two had had, including an instance in which Tammy seduces Ron's father. In the second 90-second clip, Tom directs customers to Andy's shoeshine in exchange for a 40 percent commission, while Mark tries to get Ann to abandon her nursing patients to spend more time with him. Lawrence, a neighbor with a long-standing feud with Andy, mocks him by giving him dozens of soiled shoes to clean.

== Cultural references ==
The day after having sex with Tammy, Ron comes to work wearing a red shirt and black pants, which prompts Tom to observe that Ron always dresses like golf pro Tiger Woods after having sex. This joke was written—and aired—just before the story of Woods' extramarital affairs scandal broke in the news in late November 2009.

Andy is said to have auditioned for the reality television show Survivor and the television game show Deal or No Deal. During an audition tape, he is shown gutting a fish to prove he could perform on Deal or No Deal, even though the action is far more appropriate for Survivor.

During one scene, to Leslie's shock and confusion, Tammy said she would rather be Cleopatra, the last pharaoh of Egypt's Ptolemaic dynasty, than Eleanor Roosevelt, the former First Lady and wife of U.S. President Franklin D. Roosevelt.

== Reception ==
=== Ratings ===
In its original American broadcast on November 5, 2009, "Ron and Tammy" was seen by 4.93 million household viewers, according to Nielsen Media Research. Among viewers aged between 18 and 49, the episode drew a 2.2 rating/6 share; a share represents the percentage of households using a television at the time the program is airing. It was the highest rating to that point for the season, and a 10 percent jump from the previous episode, "Greg Pikitis".

=== Reviews ===
Offerman (performs) so perfectly deadpan that you actually believe in the ridiculous things he says, which makes it that much funnier. And I generally don't like Megan Mullally, but seeing Offerman's real-life wife play Swanson's ex-wife made me laugh harder than I've laughed at any show this year

— Kat Angus, Dose

"Ron and Tammy" received critical acclaim and is widely considered one of the best episodes of Parks and Recreation. Alan Sepinwall of The Star-Ledger said "Ron and Tammy" was the funniest episode of the season, particularly for the dead-pan performance of Nick Offerman. Sepinwall also praised the parks employees' hatred for the library, and the fact that minor characters Jerry and Donna are further developing. Matt Fowler of IGN called it a "particularly solid episode", and he enjoyed seeing Leslie serve as the voice of reason. Fowler said the Andy subplot was less funny than the main plot, but it advanced Andy's character. Steve Heisler from The A.V. Club praised the episode and the performance of Offerman, who he said showed a deeper comedic range than in previous episodes. Heisler also praised Pratt and Poehler, who he said shined in showing a more sensible side. Entertainment Weekly writer Hillary Busis called the episode "damn near perfect" and said it made her "fall truly, madly, deeply in love with Parks and Recreation." Ross Luippold of The Huffington Post called "Ron and Tammy" one of the highlights of the season.

Steve Kandell of New York magazine called "Ron and Tammy" one of the moments when Parks and Recreation "found its voice and its footing". Dose writer Kat Angus said "Ron and Tammy" solidified Parks and Recreation as "the funniest show on TV this season". Angus praised Offerman's performance and his pairing with Mullally. TV Guide writer Matt Roush, who had previously been very critical of Parks and Recreation, called "Ron and Tammy" "unquestionably the show’s best episode to date". Roush particularly praised the comedic chemistry between Offerman and Mullally, who he said "make beautiful comic music together". Time magazine reviewer James Poniewozik called it an "excellent episode", and said it balanced well the show's formula of comedy focused on people and small-town government. H.T. "Hercules" Strong, a regular columnist with Ain't it Cool News, praised Poehler and Mullally, and said the editing, particularly during the diner scene with Ron and Tammy, was worthy of an Emmy Award nomination. CNN associated producer Henry Hanks praised the "uproarious performances" of both Offerman and Mullally, while another CNN review of called Mullally's guest performance "Emmy-worthy", and praised the performances of Offerman, Poehler and Pratt. It also said, "Poehler’s development of her character this season has been great to watch".

== DVD release ==
"Ron and Tammy", along with the other 23 second season episodes of Parks and Recreation, was released on a four-disc DVD set in the United States on November 30, 2010. The DVD included deleted scenes for each episode. It also included a commentary track for "Ron and Tammy" featuring Nick Offerman, Megan Mullally, and series co-creators Michael Schur and Greg Daniels.
