= Total Access Recording =

Recording studio in Redondo Beach, California, United States

Coordinates: 33°51′34″N 118°22′10″W

- Founded: 1980
- Founder: Wyn Davis
- Genre: All
- Country of origin: USA
- Location: Redondo Beach, California
- Official website: tarecording.com

Total Access Recording is a recording studio located in Redondo Beach, California, owned and operated by founder Wyn Davis and Steve Ornest. Total Access opened for business in December 1980. The first clients of the studio were bands signed with SST Records, whose owner Greg Ginn had made a "bulk recording deal" with Davis. Producer Ken Scott is also a client of the studio.

== Notable clients ==
- Black Flag
- Descendents
- Colleen D'Agostino
- Dio
- Dokken
- Foreigner
- Gastunk
- Great White
- Guns N' Roses
- Heaven & Hell
- Hüsker Dü
- Iglesia Indica
- Jae Jin
- Long Beach Dub Allstars
- Minutemen
- No Doubt
- Pennywise
- Pepper
- Saint Vitus
- Slightly Stoopid
- SNEW
- Sublime
- Unwritten Law
