= Alan Niven =

Band manager in New Zealand

- Born: Wellington, New Zealand
- Occupations: Band manager for Guns N' Roses and Great White
- Spouse: Heather Vincent Niven

Alan Niven is a New Zealand-born band manager best known for his tenure as manager of Guns N' Roses and Great White.

== Biography ==
Niven attended boarding school in England from the age of seven. He later recalled: “The first major trauma of my life. English boarding schools were all about the maintenance of empire. If you could fucking survive boarding school, there was nothing an Afghan tribe could throw at you that would be worse.”

He began working for Virgin Records in London, and later moved to Los Angeles, where he joined Greenworld. While there he signed Motley Crue to their first contract. He later brought them to Elektra through Tom Zutaut.

As Great White's manager, Niven had a close collaboration with the band. He became the producer of their Capitol and Zoo albums. As evident on record credits, he also became the primary supplier af content and melody for their post 1986 material, earning songwriting credits on every album from Great White to Sail Away, and determined the band's aesthetic. Jon Hotten writes: "He turned the sound into imagery, lyrics, album covers, videos – he understood better than anyone else what the band actually was." Guitarist Mark Kendall similarly commented: “He had a vision. He was right most of the time.” Niven managed Great White from 1982 until 1995, being fired after an argument with Russell.

Niven became the manager of Guns N' Roses, serving from 1986 to 1991. He was fired from his post just prior to the release of Use Your Illusion. According to a 1991 cover story by Rolling Stone magazine, frontman Axl Rose forced the dismissal of Niven (against the wishes of some of his band-mates) by refusing to complete the albums until he was replaced. He was replaced by his former partner Doug Goldstein.

After being fired as manager of both Guns N' Roses and Great White, Niven fell into depression after discovering his then-wife had been secretly having a relationship with Jack Russell. He subsequently married Heather Vincent.

After The Station nightclub fire, Niven reconnected with Great White guitarist Mark Kendall and keyboardist Michael Lardie, but his relationship with Russell remained strained. Niven remarked: "Jack had really pleasant parents. And yet he exhibited a destructive criminal streak from his early teens."

Niven has also been a manager of Buck & Evans, Great White, and associated with Virgin Records, Enigma Records, Mötley Crüe, Berlin, Dokken, Clarence Clemons, The Angels [from Angel City], Havana Black, The Michael Thompson Band [MTB], Izzy Stradlin and The JuJu Hounds, Razer and Storm of Perception.
