= Amaseffer =

Israeli progressive metal band

- Origin: Tel Aviv, Israel
- Genres: Progressive metal; folk metal
- Years active: 2004–present
- Label: InsideOut
- Members: Erez Yohanan
- Past members: Hanan Avramovich; Yuval Kramer
- Website: amaseffer.com

Amaseffer is an Israeli progressive metal band formed in 2004 in Tel Aviv by drummer and percussionist Erez Yohanan and guitarist Yuval Kramer. A year later, second guitarist Hanan Avramovich joined the group. The band's name comes from the Hebrew "Am Ha'Sefer" (עם הספר)—people of the (holy) book; a name from the Old Testament for the Israelites and later for the Jews. Amaseffer's music is described as progressive metal, with elements of rock, heavy metal, world music, and Middle Eastern touches.

== History ==
=== Slaves for life, Altalena (2006–2008) ===
In 2006, drummer and percussionist Erez Yohanan, together with guitarists Yuval Kramer and Hanan Avramovich, began piecing together a musical project whose goal was to create a trilogy of albums that would tell the Old Testament story of the Exodus, from the Hebrew slavery period in ancient Egypt, through the years in the desert, and up to the entrance of the twelve tribes of Israel into the Promised Land of Canaan. They recruited Andy Kuntz, lead singer of the German metal band Vanden Plas, to sing on the first record, titled Slaves for Life, which tells the story of the events starting with the Hebrew slavery, through the birth of Moses, and ending with the ten plagues of Egypt. Kuntz was also set to produce the trilogy.

In 2007, the band announced that Kuntz had departed the project and that instead, Swedish singer Mats Levén (Krux, ex-Therion, ex-At Vance, Yngwie Malmsteen) would take over on vocals.

Recording was completed in November and included additional input from the likes of Angela Gossow (Arch Enemy), Kobi Farhi (Orphaned Land), and Amir Gwirtzman. In April 2008, the band signed with Inside Out Music, and Slaves for Life was released in June.

The band was subsequently approached by an Israeli filmmaker to record and produce the full score to the film Altalena—based on the 1948 Altalena Affair.

=== Kna'an collaboration with Orphaned Land (2016) ===
In 2016, Amaseffer resurfaced with a collaborative album, titled Kna'an, with fellow Israelis Orphaned Land, released on Century Media Records.

=== When the Lions Leave Their Den (2010–2026) ===
In April 2010, it was revealed that the second album in the trilogy would be titled When the Lions Leave Their Den and that it would mainly focus on the Exodus of the Israelites from Egypt, the opening track being "Pillar of Fire". Mats Levén was said to have recorded vocals for several of the album's songs. The project was dormant for many years, and in July 2026, the band announced that the album would be released in October. The first single, the album's title track, was published in August. The album, officially titled When the Lions Leave Their Den (Exodus Part II), came out on 8 October. It includes vocal contributions from Levén and Kobi Farhi, among others.

== Discography ==
Studio albums

- Slaves for Life (2008)
- When the Lions Leave Their Den (2026)

Other albums

- Altalena original film score (2008)
- Kna'an with Orphaned Land (2016)

== Band members ==
Current

- Erez Yohanan – drums, percussion, narrating (2004–present)

Past

- Hanan Avramovich – guitars (2004–?)
- Yuval Kramer – guitars (2004–p?)

Collaborators

- Andy Kuntz – lead vocals (2006–2007)
- Mats Levén – lead vocals (2007–present)
