= Beyond Daylight =

Studio album by Vanden Plas
- Released: 28 January 2002
- Genre: Progressive metal
- Length: 60:16
- Label: InsideOut Music
- Producer: Markus Teske

Vanden Plas chronology
Spirit of Live (2000)	Beyond Daylight (2002)	Christ 0 (2006)

Professional ratings
Review scores
Source	Rating
MetalStorm	5/5 stars
Metal-Archives	5/5 stars

Beyond Daylight is the fourth full-length studio album by the German progressive metal band Vanden Plas. It was released on 28 January 2002 by InsideOut/SPV Records.

== Track listing ==
No.	Title	Lyrics	Music	Length
1.	"Nightwalker"	Kuntz	Werno	7:33
2.	"Cold Wind"	Kuntz	S.Lill	5:16
3.	"Scarlet Flower Fields"	Kuntz	S.Lill	5:38
4.	"Healing Tree"	Kuntz	Werno	5:47
5.	"End of All Days"	Kuntz	S.Lill	7:25
6.	"Free the Fire"	Kuntz	S.Lill	4:31
7.	"Can You Hear Me"	Kuntz	Werno	4:11
8.	"Phoenix"	Kuntz	S.Lill/Werno	5:59
9.	"Beyond Daylight"	Kuntz	Werno	10:40

Bonus tracks
No.	Title	Length
10.	"Point of Know Return (Kansas cover)" (limited edition bonus track)	3:16

== Personnel ==
- Andy Kuntz – Vocals
- Stephan Lill – Guitars
- Günter Werno – Keyboards
- Torsten Reichert – Bass
- Andreas Lill – Drums
