= Missa Mercuria =

Studio album by Missa Mercuria
- Released: 2002
- Recorded: House of Audio Studios, Karlsdorf, Germany
- Genre: Progressive metal
- Length: 63:09
- Label: Lion Music
- Producer: Dennis Ward

Missa Mercuria is a progressive metal project which involved members of the German bands Vanden Plas, Pink Cream 69 and Silent Force.

The album released by the project is a rock opera based on an idea and story by Karin Forstner and issued through Lion Music in 2002. The story revolves around the intervention of the Gods - represented by the four elements Fire, Water, Earth and Air - to prevent the destruction of Mankind and on the mission of the Gods' messenger Mercuria back in time.

It features lyrics written by D. C. Cooper and music written by Alex Beyrodt (Sinner, The Sygnet, Silent Force, Voodoo Circle), Günter Werno and Stephan Lill (Vanden Plas) and Alfred Koffler (Pink Cream 69). There are also vocal features of David Readman (Pink Cream 69), Andy Kuntz (Vanden Plas) and Sabine Edelsbacher (Edenbridge).

== Track listing ==
All lyrics by D. C. Cooper, music as indicated

No.	Title	Music	Length
1.	"Earth's Destruction" (instrumental)	Stephan Lill	2:25
2.	"Requiem Mortale" (instrumental)	Alex Beyrodt	1:08
3.	"Divine Spark" (Firegod)	Lill	5:00
4.	"Whisper of the Soul" (Watergoddess)	Günter Werno	6:15
5.	"Mother Earth" (Earthgoddess)	Alfred Koffler	4:45
6.	"Spirit of Wisdom" (Airgod)	Werno	5:59
7.	"Illusion of Time" (instrumental)	Werno	2:59
8.	"Missa Mercuria"	Beyrodt	6:27
9.	"Fairytale of Truth"	Werno	4:49
10.	"Farewell for Love's Sake"	Werno	5:04
11.	"Departure to Fear" (instrumental)	Lill	1:10
12.	"Strange Desert Walk" (instrumental)	Koffler	2:43
13.	"Bursting Ego"	Lill	5:00
14.	"Down to Hell" (instrumental)	Koffler	0:32
15.	"Rectificando"	Koffler	6:57
16.	"New Eon Arises" (instrumental)	Beyrodt	1:56

== Personnel ==
=== Vocalists and characters ===
- D. C. Cooper (Firegod)
- Sabine Edelsbacher (Watergoddess)
- Lori Williams (Earthgoddess)
- Andy Kuntz (Airgod)
- Isolde Groß (Mercuria)
- David Readman (Narrator)

=== Musicians ===
- Stephan Lill - guitars
- Alfred Koffler - guitars
- Alex Beyrodt - guitars
- Günter Werno - keyboards
- Dennis Ward - bass
- Andreas Lill - drums
- Pedro Weiss - percussion

=== Production ===
- Dennis Ward - producer, engineer
- Achim Kohler - mixing
