= Terry Ilous =

French-American singer (born 1966)

- Born: Terry Ilous; February 20, 1966 (age 60); Lyon, France
- Genres: Hard rock, heavy metal, glam metal
- Occupations: Singer-songwriter, musician
- Instrument: Vocals
- Years active: 1989–present

Terry Ilous (born February 20, 1966) is a French-American rock singer, best known as the founder and lead vocalist of the hard rock band XYZ, as well as the lead singer of Great White from 2010 to 2018. Over the course of his career, Ilous has sold more than 1.5 million records worldwide.

== Early life ==
Terry Ilous was born in Lyon, France in 1966. He moved to the United States in 1986 to pursue a career in music. Initially working as a session vocalist in Los Angeles, Ilous quickly became involved Sunset Strip rock scene, before getting signed to Enigma Records.

== Career ==
=== XYZ ===
In the late 1980s, Ilous co-founded the band XYZ with bassist Pat Fontaine. The band signed with Enigma Records and released their self-titled debut album in 1989, produced by Don Dokken. The album peaked at number 99 on the Billboard 200. Ilous and XYZ gained national exposure with music videos on MTV, and they toured extensively throughout the early 1990s.

The group released a second album, Hungry, in 1991 which included a notable cover of the song Fire and Water by the band Free. Released during the decline of hair bands and the rise of grunge, Hungry failed to reach the Billboard charts. Further, Ilous and XYZ faced controversy over the portrayal of women in the music video for the song Face Down in the Gutter.

XYZ disbanded in the mid-1990 but later reunited for several performances and recordings. Throughout the years, Ilous has remained the band's consistent frontman, performing internationally under the XYZ name.

In late 2023, Ilous and rest of the classic lineup began writing new songs together and planned to record material in Denver, Colorado at former XYZ drummer Joey Shapiro's studio.

=== Great White ===
In 2010, Ilous began performing with Great White, initially as a fill-in vocalist, to cover for original vocalist Jack Russell who became ill. He became the band's official lead singer in 2012 following Russell's official departure.

Ilous later recorded two albums with Great White: Elation (2012) and Full Circle (2017). His tenure with the group lasted until 2018, when he was dismissed via email, a move he publicly expressed surprise over. Between 2010 and 2018, Ilous performed in 560 concerts with Great White, most of which were sold out.

=== Solo Work and Collaborations ===
In 2010, Ilous formed La Famiglia Superstar, a collaborative hard rock project featuring Ilous on lead vocals, Marco Mendoza (Thin Lizzy, Whitesnake, The Dead Daisies) on bass, Atma Anur (Journey, Tony MacAlpine, Cacophony) on drums and guitarist Steve Saluto.

Their self-titled debut album, La Famiglia Superstar, was produced by former Dokken guitarist Alex De Rosso and blends hard rock with funk, blues and melodic metal. The album includes a cover of Whitesnake's Here I Go Again and showcases polished musicianship across a range of styles.

Ilous released a solo album in 2017 titled Gypsy Dreams, featuring flamenco-style renditions of classic rock songs. The album was well-received for its unique arrangements and vocal performances.

Ilous later toured under the name Terry Ilous and the Vagabonds, performing a unique set that blended classic rock hits with a Latin-inspired sound. The project showcased Ilous's vocal versatility and reinterpreted well-known songs through flamenco, salsa, and gypsy-jazz arrangements.

In 2022, Ilous collaborated with guitarist George Lynch on the single "Dead or Alive" as part of a project with the band All or Nothing. Ilous and Lynch have also toured together, performing songs from Dokken's catalog and their own musical repertoires. Ilous also collaborated with Jack Russell, the singer he replaced in Great White, in 2022. The two performed together on a cover of Tom Petty's I Won't Back Down.

In addition to his solo and band work, Ilous has toured as part of the Legends of Classic Rock, a touring ensemble of prominent rock musicians from bands such as Foreigner, Toto, Asia, and The Cult. The group performs classic hits from each artist's respective catalog, with Ilous contributing vocals on songs spanning multiple decades of rock history.

=== Session work ===
Ilous has worked as a session vocalist on various recording projects across multiple rock subgenres. He has provided background vocals and recording session contributions for major artists such as Guns N' Roses, AC/DC, and David Bowie. Ilous is also a songwriter, with over 300 songs written and published for other artists, as well as for film and television projects.

== Discography ==
=== Solo ===
- 2007 – Here and Gone
- 2017 – Gypsy Dreams
- 2020 – Hired Gun

=== With XYZ ===
- 1985 – XYZ (EP)
- 1989 – XYZ
- 1991 – Hungry
- 1995 – Take What You Can... Live
- 2003 – Letter to God
- 2005 – Rainy Days (demos)
- 2005 – Forbidden Demos 1985/1991
- 2008 – Best of XYZ

=== With Great White ===
- 2012 – Elation
- 2013 – 30 Years: Live from the Sunset Strip
- 2016 – Great White – Metal Meltdown: Live from the Hard Rock Casino Las Vegas
- 2017 – Full Circle

=== Other collaborations ===
- 1997 – JK Northrup – Cage (vocals)
- 2005 – Eddie Ojeda – Axes 2 Axes (vocals on "Tonight")
- 2007 – Emotions in Motion (with Takayoshi Ohmura)
- 2009 – Jun Senoue: The Works (guest vocals, with Jun Senoue)
- 2010 – La Famiglia Superstar – La Famiglia Superstar (with Marco Mendoza, Atma Anur, Steve Saluto)
- 2010 – Cage – Cage (lead vocals; featured guests include bassists Jeff Pilson, Tony Franklin and drummers Carmine Appice, James Kottak, Vinnie Appice, and Randy Castillo)
- 2011 – Liberty N' Justice – Chasing a Cure (guest vocalist)
- 2011 – Bridger – Bridger (guest vocalist)
- 2013 – A World With Heroes – A KISS Tribute For Cancer Care (vocals on "Forever")
- 2015 – Steve Saluto & Terry Ilous – No Quarter (lead vocals on Led Zeppelin cover)
- 2019 – Morano – Incognito (lead vocals on multiple tracks)
- 2020 – Rocha – Unum (guest vocals)
- 2020 – Ramos – My Many Sides (guest vocals)
- 2023 – "I Won't Back Down" (Tom Petty cover), duet with Jack Russell

== Personal life ==
Terry Ilous resides in Southern California and remains active in the music scene, performing both as a solo artist and with XYZ. In addition to his singing career, he has worked as a voice actor and contributed to both television and film projects. His credits include work on the animated series Rick and Morty and the feature film Rugrats in Paris: The Movie.

Ilous has participated in a number of charity-related music projects. In 2011, he contributed to the all-star single "One Family," produced by United Rockers 4U to raise funds for victims of the earthquake and tsunami in Japan. The project featured artists from bands such as Quiet Riot, Whitesnake, and Poison. In 2016, he performed at the Rock the Ride charity concert in Vernal, Utah, an event organized to support local community outreach programs.
