= Spirit of Live =

Live album by Vanden Plas
- Released: October 3rd, 2000
- Genre: Progressive metal
- Length: 73:23
- Label: InsideOut Records
- Producer: Vanden Plas

Vanden Plas chronology
Far Off Grace (1999)	Spirit of Live (2000)	Beyond Daylight (2002)

Professional ratings
Review scores
Source	Rating
AllMusic	3/5 stars

Spirit of Live is the first live album by the progressive metal band Vanden Plas. The song "Kiss of Death" features Don Dokken as guest on lead vocals and "Rainmaker" features Patrick Rondat as guest on lead guitar.

== Track listing ==
1. "I Can See" (Andy Kuntz, Stephan Lill) - 4:26
2. "Into The Sun" (Andy Kuntz, Günter Werno) - 7:05
3. "Soul Survives" (Andy Kuntz, Günter Werno) - 9:52
4. "How Many Tears" (Andy Kuntz, Stephan Lill) - 10:37
5. "I Don't Miss You" (Andy Kuntz, Günter Werno) - 3:50
6. "Journey to Paris" (Günter Werno) - 3:08
7. "Spirit of Life" (Stephan Lill, Günter Werno) - 4:28
8. "Iodic Rain" (Andy Kuntz, Stephan Lill) - 6:11
9. "Far Off Grace" (Andy Kuntz, Stephan Lill) - 9:51
10. "Kiss of Death" (Dokken/Lynch/Pilson) - 5:28
11. "Rainmaker" (Andy Kuntz, Stephan Lill) - 8:38

Note: "Kiss Of Death" & "I Don't Miss You" are only included on the European version. The American version features "You Fly".

== Personnel ==
- Andy Kuntz – Vocals
- Stephan Lill – Guitar
- Günter Werno – Keyboards
- Torsten Reichert – Bass
- Andreas Lill – Drums
- Don Dokken – Vocals on Kiss of Death
- Patrick Rondat – Guitar on Rainmaker
