= Far Off Grace =

Studio album by Vanden Plas
- Released: 16 September 1999
- Studio: House of Audio, Karlsdorf, Germany
- Genre: Progressive metal
- Length: 54:13
- Label: InsideOut Records
- Producer: Vanden Plas and Dennis Ward

Vanden Plas chronology
| The God Thing (1997) | Far Off Grace (1999) | Spirit of Live (2000) |

Far Off Grace is the third full-length album by the German progressive metal band Vanden Plas. It was later re-released in 2004 as a special edition with two bonus track and multimedia material.

== Track listing ==
| No. | Title | Lyrics | Music | Length |
|---|---|---|---|---|
| 1. | "I Can See" | Kuntz | S.Lill | 4:01 |
| 2. | "Far Off Grace" | Kuntz | S.Lill | 7:03 |
| 3. | "Into the Sun" | Kuntz | Werno | 6:32 |
| 4. | "Where is the Man?" | Kuntz | S.Lill | 6:10 |
| 5. | "Iodic Rain" | Kuntz | S.Lill | 6:13 |
| 6. | "I Don't Miss You" | Kuntz | Kuntz/Werno | 3:51 |
| 7. | "Inside of Your Head" | Kuntz | S.Lill | 6:54 |
| 8. | "Fields of Hope" | Kuntz | Werno/S.Lill | 6:46 |
| 9. | "I'm in You" | Kuntz | S.Lill | 6:43 |

Bonus tracks
| No. | Title | Length |
|---|---|---|
| 1. | "Kiss of Death (Dokken cover)" (2004 reissue bonus track) | 5:42 |
| 2. | "Shape of My Heart (Sting cover)" (2004 reissue bonus track) | 4:47 |
| 3. | "Iodic Rain (enhanced video)" (2004 reissue bonus track) | 6:12 |

== Personnel ==
- Andy Kuntz – vocals, backing vocals, cover concept
- Stephan Lill – guitars, backing vocals
- Günter Werno – keyboards, backing vocals
- Torsten Reichert – bass
- Andreas Lill – drums, backing vocals

=== Production ===
- Vanden Plas – producer
- Dennis Ward – producer, engineer, mixing, backing vocals
- Arsenic – cover design and layout
- Artur Bente – photography
