= Colour Temple =

Studio album by Vanden Plas
- Released: 1994
- Recorded: ROKO Soundstudio in Schöneck, Hesse
- Genre: Progressive metal
- Length: 58:33
- Label: Limb
- Producer: Vanden Plas, Robert Kohlmeyer

Vanden Plas chronology
Colour Temple (1994)	AcCult (1996)

Colour Temple is the first studio album by progressive metal band Vanden Plas, released in late 1994 through Limb Music and in June 1995 through Dream Circle Records; a two-disc edition was reissued in 2002 through Inside Out Music, which included the band's 1996 acoustic EP AcCult.

== Track listing ==
No.	Title	Lyrics	Music	Length
1.	"Father" (Intro taken from "The Rite of Spring" by Igor Stravinsky)	Andy Kuntz	Stephan Lill	5:39
2.	"Push"	Kuntz	S. Lill, Günter Werno	4:16
3.	"When the Wind Blows"	Kuntz	S. Lill	7:10
4.	"My Crying"	Kuntz	S. Lill	5:26
5.	"Soul Survives"	Kuntz	Werno	9:07
6.	"Anytime"	Kuntz	Kuntz, S. Lill	7:06
7.	"Judas"	Kuntz	Kuntz	6:03
8.	"Back to Me"	Kuntz	Kuntz, S. Lill	5:31
9.	"How Many Tears"	Kuntz	S.Lill	8:15
Total length:				58:33

Japanese edition bonus tracks
No.	Title	Length
10.	"Fire"	5:18
11.	"Days of Thunder"	4:45

== Personnel ==
- Andy Kuntz – lead vocals, background vocals, production
- Stephan Lill – guitar, background vocals, production
- Günter Werno – keyboard, background vocals, production
- Andreas Lill – drums, production
- Torsten Reichert – bass, production
- Robert Kohlmeyer – background vocals, production
- Miriam Bonmarchand – background vocals (track 6)
