= The God Thing =

Studio album by Vanden Plas
- Released: 1997
- Genre: Progressive metal
- Length: 56:45
- Label: Inside Out Music / Limb Music
- Producer: Vanden Plas

Vanden Plas chronology
AcCult (1996)	The God Thing (1997)	Far Off Grace (1999)

The God Thing is the second full-length studio album by the German progressive metal band Vanden Plas. It was later re-released in 2004 as a special edition with two bonus tracks.

== Track listing ==
No.	Title	Lyrics	Music	Length
1.	"Fire Blossom"	Instrumental	Werno	2:55
2.	"Rainmaker"	Kuntz	S.Lill	6:40
3.	"Garden of Stones"	Kuntz	Kuntz/Werno	7:48
4.	"In You: I Believe"	Kuntz	S.Lill/Werno	4:28
5.	"Day I Die"	Kuntz	S.Lill	6:05
6.	"Crown of Thorns"	Kuntz	Kuntz	6:42
7.	"We're Not God"	Kuntz	S.Lill	7:12
8.	"Salt in My Wounds"	Kuntz	S.Lill	7:21
9.	"You Fly"	Kuntz	S.Lill	7:34

Bonus tracks
No.	Title	Length
1.	"Combien De Larmes" (French bonus track, 2004 reissue bonus track)	4:29
2.	"You Fly (live)" (2004 reissue bonus track)	9:16
3.	"Spanish Rain (Saigon Kick cover)" (French limited FNAC edition)	7:15
4.	"Days of Thunder (acoustic version)" (French limited FNAC edition)	4:39
5.	"Raining in My Heart" (French limited FNAC edition)	4:39

== Personnel ==
- Andy Kuntz – vocals
- Stephan Lill – guitars
- Günter Werno – keyboards
- Torsten Reichert – bass
- Andreas Lill – drums

Guest musicians

- Paul Achim Schneider - cello (on "Fire Blossom", "Crown of Thorns" & "You Fly")
- Gunni Mahling - violin (on "Fire Blossom", "Crown of Thorns" & "You Fly")

=== Production ===
- Produced by Vanden Plas
- Recorded and mixed at ROKO Soundstudio in Schöneck, GER
- Engineered and mixed by Robert Kohlmeyer
- Keyboards and strings recorded at Jam Studio in Pirmasens, GER
- Engineered by Stefan Glass
- Backing vocals by Andy Kuntz, Stephan Lill & Günter Werno
- Cover design and layout by Arsenic
- Cover sculpture made by Cesare Marcotto
- Sculpture photographed by Manfred Prusseit
- Photos by Artur Bente
