= Christ 0 =

Studio album by Vanden Plas
- Released: March 31, 2006
- Recorded: 2005
- Genre: Progressive metal
- Length: 67:15
- Label: Inside Out Music
- Producer: Markus Teske

Vanden Plas chronology
Beyond Daylight (2002)	Christ 0 (2006)	The Seraphic Clockwork (2010)

Professional ratings
Review scores
Source	Rating
Allmusic	link
Scream Magazine	4/6 stars

Christ 0 is the fifth full-length studio album by the German progressive metal band Vanden Plas, released on March 31, 2006 by InsideOut Music. This concept album interprets the Alexandre Dumas 1844 novel The Count of Monte Cristo, exploring the story of a man imprisoned for a crime he didn't commit and following his chain of vengeful murders through the eyes of "X," an Interpol detective assigned to the case. Throughout the course of the album, both characters come to terms with their goals; X realizes just how similar the nature of his work is to Christ-0's, while 0 repents for the sins of his vengeance and commits suicide. The lyrics make several contemporary references, alluding to modern movies (e.g. Silence of the Lambs) and organizations (Interpol).

The band employed a forty-piece choir for the first time in this album. Lead vocalist Andy Kuntz stated that such orchestral elements were new to Vanden Plas and attributes this experimentation with the four-year wait since their previous album, Beyond Daylight.

== Track listing ==
No.	Title	Lyrics	Music	Length
1.	"Christ 0"	Kuntz	Werno	5:34
2.	"Postcard to God"	Kuntz	S. Lill	6:17
3.	"Wish You Were Here"	Kuntz	Werno	9:14
4.	"Silently"	Kuntz	S. Lill	8:31
5.	"Shadow I Am"	Kuntz	S. Lill	5:28
6.	"Fireroses Dance"	Kuntz	Werno	6:03
7.	"Somewhere Alone in the Dark"	Kuntz	S. Lill	5:30
8.	"January Sun"	Kuntz	Werno/Kuntz	10:05
9.	"Lost in Silence"	Kuntz	Kuntz	4:19

bonus track edition
No.	Title	Lyrics	Music	Length
10.	"Gethsemane"	Tim Rice	Andrew Lloyd Webber	6:18

== Bonus track ==
The first copies of Christ 0 contained a bonus track, Gethsemane. This track is a cover of a song from Jesus Christ Superstar of the same name.

== Musicians ==
- Andy Kuntz – Vocals
- Stephan Lill – Guitars
- Günter Werno – Keyboards
- Torsten Reichert – Bass
- Andreas Lill – Drums

== Personnel ==
- Thomas Ewerhard – Artwork
- Markus Teske – Producer, Mastering, Mixing
- Vanden Plas – Arranger, Producer
- Stefanie Veenstra – Photography
