= The Seraphic Clockwork =

Studio album by Vanden Plas
- Released: 4 June 2010
- Genre: Progressive metal
- Length: 72:31
- Label: Frontiers Records

Vanden Plas chronology
Christ 0 (2006)	The Seraphic Clockwork (2010)	Chronicles of the Immortals: Netherworld (Path One) (2014)

Professional ratings
Review scores
Source	Rating
Danger Dog	4.5/5 stars
Metal Express Radio	(8/10)

The Seraphic Clockwork is the sixth full-length album by the German progressive metal band Vanden Plas released through Frontiers Records.

== Track listing ==
1. "Frequency" (M: S. Lill; L: Kuntz) – 6:16
2. "Holes in the Sky" (M: S. Lill; L: Kuntz) – 5:26
3. "Scar of an Angel" (M: S. Lill; L: Kuntz) – 7:27
4. "Sound of Blood" (M: Werno; L: Kuntz) – 6:47
5. "The Final Murder" (M: S. Lill; L: Kuntz) – 9:54
6. "Quicksilver" (M: Werno; L: Kuntz) – 8:54
7. "Rush of Silence" (M: Werno; L: Kuntz) – 9:23
8. "On My Way to Jerusalem" (M: S. Lill; L: Kuntz) – 12:51
9. "Eleyson" (bonus track, from the Ludus Danielis musical) – 5:33

== Personnel ==
- Andy Kuntz – Vocals
- Stephan Lill – Guitars
- Günter Werno – Keyboards
- Torsten Reichert – Bass
- Andreas Lill – Drums
