= Andreas Lill =

German progressive metal drummer (born 1965)

- Born: November 3, 1965 (age 60)
- Origin: Bad Godesberg, Germany
- Genres: Progressive metal, progressive rock
- Occupation: Musician
- Instruments: Drums, bass guitar
- Years active: 1981–present
- Labels: InsideOut Records, Frontier Records
- Website: Vanden Plas official website

Andreas Lill is a German progressive metal drummer. He is best known for his work as the drummer for the band Vanden Plas.

== Background ==
Andreas Lill was born November 3, 1965. As an early teenager he tried to learn to play bass guitar, but at 15 he started learning drums and the instrument stuck with him. He started a band called Exodus, and he recruited the now Vanden Plas singer and bandmate Andy Kuntz for vocals, and his brother Stephan Lill on guitar. The band, which has 3 live shows in Germany, evolved into the modern Vanden Plas, adding Torsten Reichert on bass and Günter Werno on keyboards. He is a trained power systems electronics technician and holds a diploma in civil engineering. To finance the beginning of his career as a professional musician, he worked as a road builder, mover, manufacturer of drill anchors and express driver, among other things. Away from Vanden Plas, Lill has been involved in many musicals, such as Jesus Christ Superstar, Rocky Horror Picture Show, Evita, Little Shop of Horrors, Rock of Ages, and others. He has also been involved in multiple side projects, such as Missa Mercuria, Abydos, Section A, Winterlong, Ian Parry's Visions and All My Shadows. His favorite bands are Van Halen, Journey and King's X. Since 2010 he runs his own drum company AL-Custom Drums and is now endorser for Istanbul Mehmet Cymbals.

== Discography ==
=== With Vanden Plas ===
- Colour Temple -(1994)
- AcCult – (1996, acoustic EP)
- The God Thing -(1997)
- Far Off Grace -(1999)
- Spirit of Live – (2000, live album)
- Beyond Daylight -(2002)
- Christ 0 -(2006)
- The Seraphic Clockwork -(2010)
- Chronicles of the Immortals: Netherworld (Path One) -(2014)
- Chronicles of the Immortals: Netherworld II -(2015)
- The Seraphic LiveWorks -(2017)
- The Ghost Xperiment-Awakening -(2019)
- The Ghost Xperiment-Illumination -(2020)

=== With Missa Mercuria ===
- Missa Mercuria -(2002)

=== With Abydos ===
- Abydos: The Little Boy's Heavy Metal Shadow Opera About The Inhabitants Of His Diary -(2004)

=== With All My Shadows ===
- Eerie Monsters -(2023)
