= Slaves for Life =

Studio album by Amaseffer
- Released: Israel: 6 June 2008
- Recorded: 29 June – 14 July 2007 at Bazement Studio, Germany
- Genre: Progressive metal; folk metal
- Length: 1:17:51
- Label: InsideOut Music
- Producer: Erez Yohanan

Professional ratings
Review scores
Source	Rating
About.com	4/5 stars
Blabbermouth.net	8/10 stars
Metal Hammer	6/7 stars
Metal Underground	4.5/5 stars
Metalist Israel	4.5/5 stars

Slaves for Life is the debut album by Israeli folk/progressive metal band Amaseffer, released on 6 June 2008 in Israel and 24 June 2008 worldwide, by InsideOut Music.

The album is the first in a trilogy of albums, telling the Old Testament's story of the Exodus, from the Hebrew slavery period in ancient Egypt, through the years in the desert, and up to the entrance of the twelve tribes of Israel to the Promised Land of Canaan (later Israel). The first in the trilogy, the album tells the story of the events starting with the Hebrews slavery, through the birth of Moses and ends with the ten plagues of Egypt.

In the time of the recording, the band just parted ways with their vocalist Andy Kuntz, and lead vocals on the album were recorded by Mats Leven (Krux, ex-Therion, ex-At Vance, Yngwie Malmsteen). Additional vocals were recorded by Kobi Farhi of Orphaned Land, Angela Gossow of Arch Enemy and Yotam Avni of Prey for Nothing.

Although the album's sound mostly considered progressive metal, it also contains a mixture of symphonic metal, world music, and Middle Eastern touches.

The band's drummer and main songwriter, Erez Yohanan, produced the album and also narrates the story. The album was mixed and mastered by Markus Teske.

== Track listing ==
No.	Title	Length
1.	"Sorrow"	2:40
2.	"Slaves for Life"	8:27
3.	"Birth of Deliverance"	11:11
4.	"Midian"	11:47
5.	"Zipporah"	6:10
6.	"Burning Bush"	6:33
7.	"The Wooden Staff"	9:13
8.	"Return to Egypt"	3:25
9.	"Ten Plagues"	11:28
10.	"Land of the Dead"	6:53

== Personnel ==
- Mats Leven – lead & backing vocals
- Hanan Avramovich – guitars
- Yuval Kramer – guitars, bass
- Erez Yohanan – drums, percussion, narrating vocals
- Kobi Farhi – Oriental vocals
- Angela Gossow – growled vocals on "Midian"
- Yotam Avni – growled vocals on "Midian"
- Maya Avraham – female vocals on "Zipporah"
- Amir Gvirtzman – flute
- Yair Yona – bass on "Zipporah" and "Burning Bush"
- Yatziv Caspi – tablas on "Slaves for Life" and "Midian"
