= Antix (band) =

American rock band

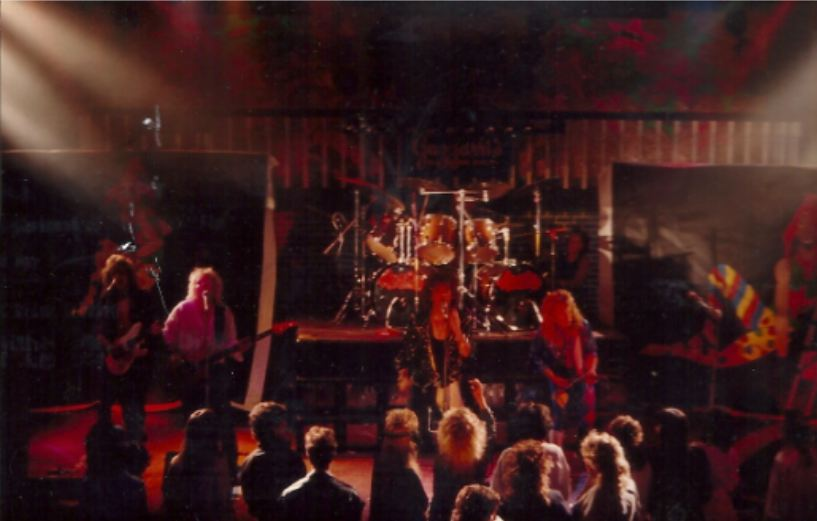
- Antix live at Gazzarri's on Sunset

Background information
- Origin: Los Angeles, California, U.S.
- Genres: Glam metal, hard rock, heavy metal
- Years active: 1982–1987

Antix was a rock band from Los Angeles that formed in 1982 and signed with then Great White roadie Jeff Gordon. In 1984 the band had managed to secure a deal under Jeff's management to do an EP (Get Up Get Happy) and have it marketed by Enigma Records. On top of that they got Don Dokken and Jeff Pilson to produce it. Dokken was recording "Tooth and Nail" during the day and Don and Pilson would work with Antix in the evening. In 1984 the song "Daze Gone By" appeared on Hit Parader magazine's compilation album The Wild Bunch along with such bands as Slayer, Lizzy Borden, Megadeth, Anthrax, Raven and Grim Reaper. In 1986 the band recruited bass player Robin Houde and guitarists Jesse (J.R.) Curtis and Jaye Paul and Mick walker Brandon into the band replacing B.J. Norris, Greg Clewley, and eventually Jace White, who went on to form the band "Serious Pleasure", which he was the lead singer and lead guitarist for. Note: Singer Fredie Vinson and bassist Dave E. Weeks were briefly the original replacements for Antix before Weeks joined Jace in forming "Serious Pleasure ", and Vinson parted ways for his own endeavors. J.R. Curtis had been playing in the band Brazil with vocalist Scott Kidd "a.k.a." Uncle Scotty from Metal Blade Records artist Overkill L.A. and working on material with Mercury Records recording artists Legs Diamond vocalist Rick Sanford. Jaye had recently arrived in the Hollywood scene from Hawaii. At one point, J.R. considered joining "Serious Pleasure", but that plan never materialized.

== Past members ==
- Ian Evans
- Jace White
- B.J. Norris (Beni Jacobs)
- Greg Clewley (Gregory Darling)
- Dave E. Weeks
- Fredie Vinson
- J.R. Curtis
- Robin Houde
- Jaye Paul
- Mic B. Nasty (was in Glass Hammer)
- Mic Brandon

== Discography ==
=== Studio albums ===
- Get Up, Get Happy (1984)
- The Wild Bunch (1985)
- I'll Take Your Love (1987)
