= XYZ (XYZ album) =

Studio album by XYZ
- Released: October 17, 1989
- Recorded: Los Angeles, 1988
- Genres: Hard rock, glam metal
- Length: 41:12
- Labels: Enigma, Axe Killer
- Producer: Don Dokken

XYZ chronology
XYZ (1989)	Hungry (1991)

Singles from XYZ
- 1. "Inside Out" Released: 1989; 2. "Souvenirs" Released: 1989; 3. "What Keeps Me Loving You" Released: 1990; 4. "Maggy" Released: 1990

XYZ is the 1989 debut album by the American hard rock band XYZ. There were two hits off the album, "Inside Out" and "What Keeps Me Loving You". The album was a moderate success, charting at No. 99 on the Billboard 200. There were two music videos made, for the songs "Inside Out" and "What Keeps Me Loving You", which both aired on MTV between 1989 and 1990.

== Background and production ==
=== Background ===
The band's drummer, Paul Monroe, joined the group shortly before recording for XYZ began. Monroe stated that his and guitarist Marc Diglio's relatively newer presence in the band had a significant impact on the band's sound and songwriting; Monroe stated in a 2022 interview that although he did not compose a lot of the band's guitar riffs or lyrics, he was tasked with coming up with "cool endings, and sometimes beginnings" of songs, contributing to arrangements and transitions, and composing the rhythm sections for solos.

=== Production ===
The album was produced by Don Dokken. One of the obstacles XYZ encountered during the album's production phase was that the lead vocalist, Terry Ilous, had a strong French accent that caused some of his words to be indecipherable to Dokken. In a 2018 interview, Dokken cited another issue with the band's sound being that the other band members were incapable of properly vocally harmonizing with Ilous, so Dokken had to sing backing vocals on the album. Despite Dokken's attempts to change his singing style in an effort to mask his identity, reviewers and other listeners noted that Dokken's voice was prominent on the tracks anyway. Dokken said, "I tried to mask my voice and change my tone. . . . so people didn't recognize me, but when the album came out, a lot of reviewers. . . . called it XYD."

Dokken stated that his experience working with XYZ on their first album deterred him from accepting an offer to work with the band on their third unreleased album, what was supposed to be the successor to 1991's Hungry (which Dokken also did not participate in producing). Dokken also suggested that he was offended at the fact that Ilous and the band's bassist, Pat Fontaine, "slammed [him]" in an interview shortly after their debut album's release wherein they discussed their experience working with Dokken on XYZ, accusing Dokken of prioritizing playing with his pet dog in the studio and drinking champagne instead of helping with the album's production. However, in a 2022 interview, Paul Monroe said he "absolutely [loved Don Dokken]" and that the band "got along really well" with Dokken, crediting Dokken with significantly improving Monroe's drumming technique, thereby contributing to improving the album's drum tracks.

== Critical reception ==
Professional ratings
Review scores
Source	Rating
AllMusic	4.5/5 stars
Kerrang!	3/5 stars

Upon the album's release, Ian McCann of New Musical Express described the music of the album as "polished, loud and unchallenged metal-rock."

Kerrang! gave the album 3 stars, stating that they found it to be "a well-delivered album," although they negatively noted the band's similarities to Dokken, likening Diglio's guitar playing to George Lynch's style and Terry Ilous's vocals to Don Dokken's vocals.

== Commercial performance ==
The album steadily climbed the Billboard 200 charts throughout late 1989 and early 1990 before peaking at #99 during its tenth week on the chart, the week of February 17, 1990. The album remained at #99 the week of February 24 as well, before falling to #101 the week of March 3. The album experienced a slight resurgence in its sixteenth week on the chart, moving from #193 to #165 the week of April 14, 1990, and rising again to #153 the week of April 21, making its exit from the chart in late May–early June 1990 after spending 24 weeks between #99 and #187.

The album's singles "Inside Out" and "What Keeps Me Loving You" both achieved moderate radio success. Drummer Paul Monroe stated in an interview that Capitol Records, to whom they were transferred after they finished working with one of Capitol's subsidiary labels, Enigma, chose their singles. However, Monroe noted that the burgeoning popularity of hip hop and grunge made it difficult for the band to meet their label's expectations, given that their genre of music was losing popularity in the late 80s and early 90s.

== Track listing ==
All tracks are written by Terry Ilous, Marc Richard Diglio and Pat Fontaine, except noted.

No.	Title	Writer(s)	Length
1.	"Maggy"		4:40
2.	"Inside Out"		4:10
3.	"What Keeps Me Loving You"		4:42
4.	"Take What You Can"		4:28
5.	"Follow the Night"		3:25
6.	"Come On n' Love Me"		3:49
7.	"Souvenirs"	Ilous, Fontaine	3:56
8.	"Tied Up"		4:14
9.	"Nice Day to Die"		5:06
10.	"After the Rain"		2:50
Total length:			41:20

Bonus edition tracks
No.	Title	Length
11.	"You Got Me Wrong" (Japanese release exclusive)	4:22
12.	"On the Blue Side of the Night" (2001 reissue bonus track)	3:28
Total length:		49:10

== Personnel ==
- Marc Richard Diglio – guitar, backing vocals
- Pat Fontaine – bass, backing vocals
- Terry Ilous – vocals
- Paul Monroe – drums, snare drums, backing vocals

Production

- Eddie Ashworth – engineer
- Wyn Davis – engineer
- Eddie DeLena – engineer, mixing
- Pat Dillon – art direction
- Don Dokken – producer, backing vocals
- Faun Clothing – wardrobe
- John Goodenough – engineer
- Dennis Keeley – photo enhancement
- Jeannine Pinkerton – typography
- Eddy Schreyer – mastering
- Melissa Sewell – engineer
- Neil Zlozower – photography

== Charts ==
Chart (1989)	Peak position
Canada Top Albums/CDs (RPM)	74
US Billboard 200	99
