= Solitary (album) =

Studio album by Don Dokken
- Released: October 21, 2008
- Genre: Acoustic rock, hard rock
- Length: 40:21
- Label: Dokken Enterprises Inc.
- Producer: Don Dokken, Wyn Davis

Don Dokken chronology
Up from the Ashes (1990)	Solitary (2008)

Solitary is a 2008 acoustic rock album by Don Dokken (singer of his original band Dokken). The album was only sold to fans attending his tour for the album, but was rereleased digitally with additional tracks in 2014, then on physical media in 2020. It was released on October 21, 2008, exactly eighteen years after his first solo album, Up from the Ashes.

== Track listing ==
2008 tour exclusive release
No.	Title	Length
1.	"In the Meadow"	4:14
2.	"I'll Never Forget"	3:47
3.	"Where the Grass Is Green"	3:54
4.	"Ship of Fools"	4:29
5.	"You Are Everything"	4:26
6.	"Venice"	4:32
7.	"Sarah"	5:56
8.	"The Tragedy"	5:02
9.	"Someday"	4:01

2014 digital re-release
No.	Title	Length
1.	"In the Meadow"	4:14
2.	"I'll Never Forget"	3:47
3.	"Where the Grass Is Green"	3:54
4.	"Jealous"	4:55
5.	"Ship of Fools"	4:29
6.	"You Are Everything"	4:26
7.	"Venice"	4:32
8.	"Sarah"	5:56
9.	"My Heart Will Go On"	4:48
10.	"The Tragedy"	5:02
11.	"Someday"	4:01
12.	"All That Love Can Be"	4:11

== Personnel ==
- Don Dokken – vocals, guitar
- Wyn Davis – guitars, bass, synths
- Michael Thompson – guitars, bass
- Steve Ornest – guitars
- Tony Franklin – bass
- Frank Lentz – drums
- Gary Ferguson – drums
- Vinnie Colaiuta – drums
- John Schreiner – piano, synth
- John Keane – piano, synth
- Kelly Keeling – background vocals on "Where The Grass Is Green"
