= Don Dokken =

American heavy metal singer

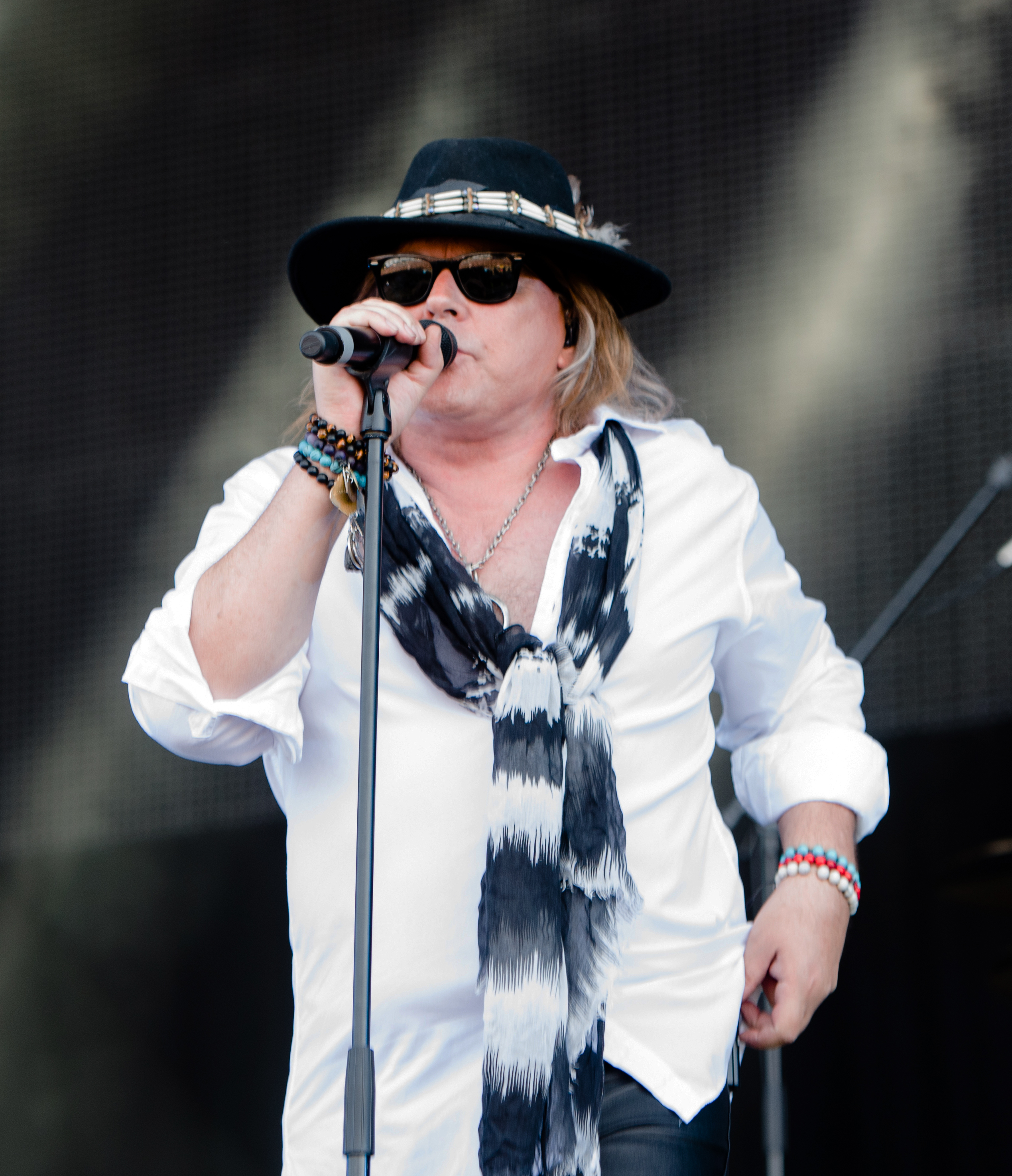
- Dokken at Wacken Open Air 2018

Background information
- Born: Donald Maynard Dokken; June 29, 1953 (age 73); Los Angeles, California, U.S.
- Genres: Glam metal; heavy metal; hard rock
- Occupations: Singer; songwriter; producer
- Years active: 1976–present
- Labels: Elektra; CMC International
- Member of: Dokken
- Website: dokken.net

Donald Maynard Dokken (born June 29, 1953) is an American musician, best known as the lead singer and founder of glam metal band Dokken. He is known for his vibrato-laden, melodic vocal style which has made him an influential figure in American heavy metal/glam metal.

After enjoying mainstream success with Dokken, he parted ways with the band in 1988 and pursued a solo career. His 1990 solo album, Up from the Ashes, spawned two singles and achieved modest success. He released his second solo album, titled Solitary, in 2008, which was a stylistic departure from his Dokken material.

Don reformed Dokken in the early 1990s and has been continuing on with the band ever since. He is the only remaining original member of Dokken.

== Biography ==
=== Early success ===
In the late 1970s, Don Dokken was playing in a Los Angeles–based band called Airborn, and had the opportunity to reach a record deal in Germany. After seeing the band Xciter with future bandmates George Lynch and Mick Brown, he tried to recruit them for a new band. Lynch and Brown were not interested in joining forces with him when he first contacted them. Don, with the help of one of Xciter's songs, secured the deal in Germany and convinced Lynch and Brown, along with bassist Juan Croucier, to join him in Dokken soon after he received it.

During his time in Germany, Dokken befriended the German hard rock band Scorpions, and sang with them in rehearsals for their Blackout album while lead vocalist Klaus Meine was being treated for nodes on his vocal cords. Don recorded scratch vocals for "No One Like You", "You Give Me All I Need", and "Dynamite”.

In 1983, America saw the release of the first Dokken album, Breaking the Chains, which got a moderate reception. After Juan Croucier left the band to join Ratt, Jeff Pilson was brought in for their second release, Tooth and Nail, and at this time metal fans and critics began to take notice of the band.

During the bands active years prior to disbanding in the late 80s, Dokken sold more than 10 million albums worldwide and their live album Beast from the East was nominated for the inaugural Grammy Award for Best Metal Performance in 1989.[10]

=== Solo release ===
In the late 1980s, however, personal tension between Dokken and Lynch took its toll on the band. In 1988, after the Monsters of Rock Tour and a further platinum album, Don Dokken decided to break up the band and they went on their separate ways. Don Dokken originally wanted to continue on under the Dokken moniker, but since the other three members shared partial ownership over the Dokken name, he was forced to put out his next album under his own name, and it became known as his first solo album.

The album, titled Up from the Ashes, was released in 1990, and was very similar to the Dokken catalog. This project was a supergroup of sorts, made up of guitarists John Norum (of Europe fame) and Billy White (of Watchtower fame), bassist Peter Baltes (of Accept fame), and drummer Mikkey Dee (of King Diamond; later Motörhead and Scorpions). John Norum's drummer Hempo Hildén was initially part of the band but was replaced by Dee before the album was recorded. Baltes had previously been a member of Dokken during the late 1970s for a brief period. Two music videos were made for the singles "Mirror Mirror" and "Stay", respectively. Also, during the late 1980s and early 1990s, Don spent time as a producer for the metal band XYZ.

He also made a guest appearance on the German progressive metal band Vanden Plas's Spirit of Live album as the vocalist for their live performance of Dokken's "Kiss of Death", the studio version of which can be found on Vanden Plas's Far Off Grace album.

=== Dokken reunion ===
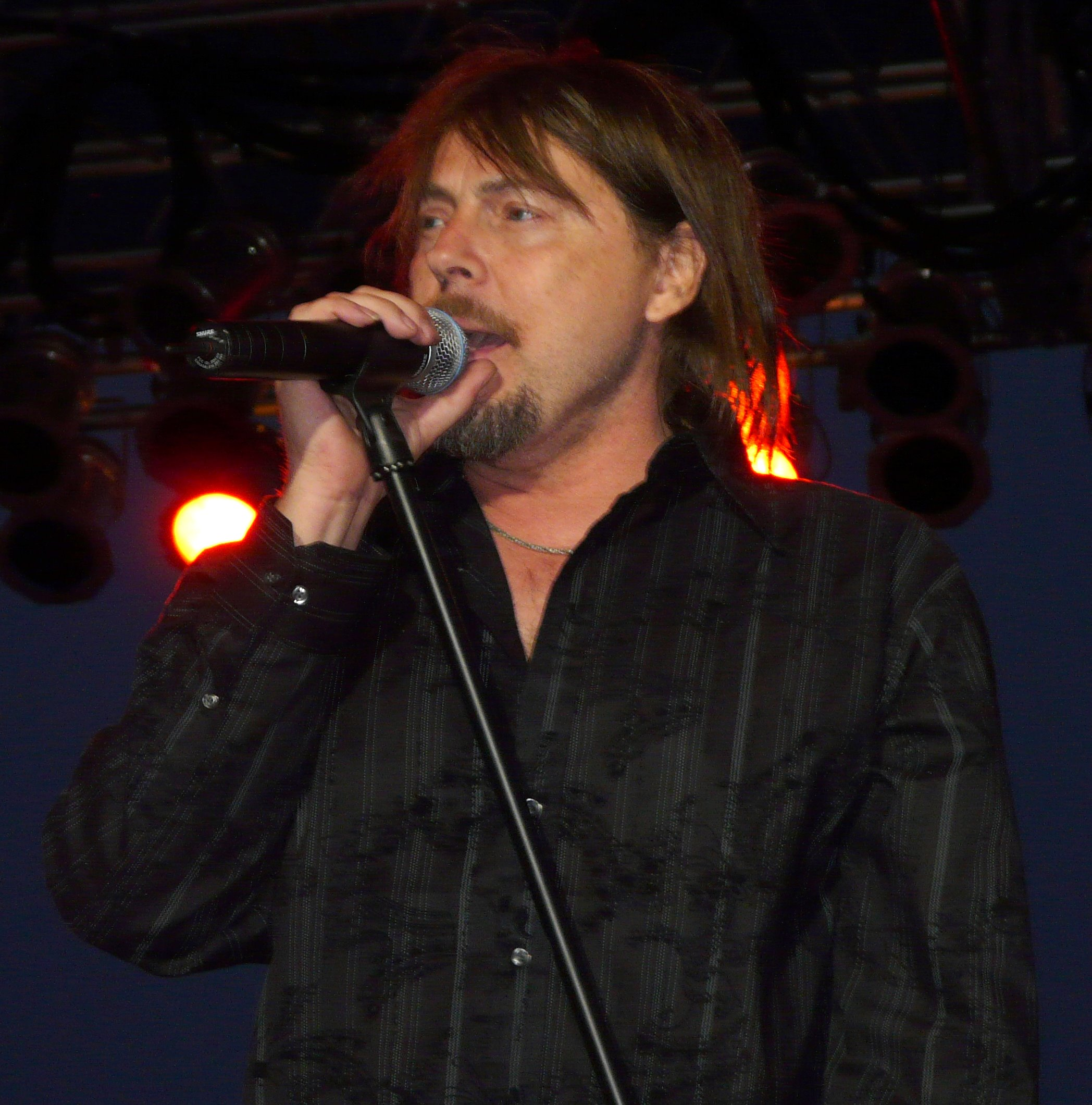
Dokken performing in 2008

Around late 1993, Don started to talk with Mick Brown, who had recently left George Lynch's new group, Lynch Mob. They joined up with Jeff Pilson, and started to write new songs. In 1994, they sent what they had written to George Lynch, who was impressed with the material. Together, they decided to reunite and tour again. This reunion lasted for three years and resulted in two new Dokken albums, an acoustic live disc, and a full live concert recorded in Japan in 1995.

In the late 90s, Dokken once again parted ways with George Lynch, gained guitarist Reb Beach, and later kicked off a new era with guitarist John Norum after the departure of Reb Beach. That union didn't last long, as Norum soon departed to re-unite with Europe. Norum was briefly replaced by Italian guitarist Alex De Rosso for the live tour until 2003 when Don managed to find a permanent replacement in guitarist/lawyer Jon Levin.

Since 1994, Dokken has released six studio albums, two live albums, a Greatest Hits album, as well as their first two DVDs. Don Dokken released a new solo album titled Solitary in 2008, and Dokken released a new album titled Lightning Strikes Again during the same year. On March 1, 2010, the band Dokken's second greatest hits album, aptly titled Greatest Hits, was digitally released to iTunes and Amazon.com. The physical album with additional tracks was released in US by Cleopatra Records May 4, 2010, and in Japan May 11, 2010, by King Records (Japan).

On September 22, 2010, in an interview with BraveWords.com, Don Dokken revealed that he would be undergoing vocal surgery, to correct problems with nodes and tears in his vocal cords. February 4, 2011, Anchorage, Alaska was Dokken's first show since surgery. Currently, he is managing ongoing health challenges stemming from a severe 2019 spinal and neck surgery, which resulted in the near-complete paralysis of his right hand. While he has regained some use of his arm and hand, he can no longer play guitar and has stepped away from extensive touring due to these physical limitations.

== Discography ==
=== Studio albums ===
Year	Album details	Peak chart positions		
Year	Album details	US	SWE	SWI
1981	Breakin' the Chains: Release date: 1981; Label: Carrere Records; Note: Earlier alternate recording of Dokken's Breaking the Chains which was released under the "Don Dokken" moniker.	—	—	—
1990	Up from the Ashes: Release date: October 21, 1990; Label: Geffen Records	50	27	38
2008	Solitary: Release date: October 21, 2008; Label: self-released	—	—	—
"—" denotes releases that did not chart

=== Singles ===
Year	Title	Peak chart positions	Album
Year	Title	US Main	Album
1990	Mirror, Mirror	26	Up from the Ashes
1990	Stay	—	Up from the Ashes
1991	Give It Up	—	Up from the Ashes

=== Tribute album appearances ===
- Hear 'n Aid – "Stars" (1986)
- Smoke on the Water: A Tribute to Deep Purple (1994) (lead vocals on "Fireball")
- Humanary Stew: A Tribute to Alice Cooper (1999) (lead vocals on "Eighteen")
- Frankie Banali and Friends – 24/7/365: The Tribute to Led Zeppelin (2007) (lead vocals on "Kashmir")

=== Other appearances ===
- Scorpions – Blackout (1982) (backing vocals)
- Great White – Out of the Night (1983) (backing vocals on On Your Knees)
- Sexist – Demo (1983) (backing vocals)
- Twisted Sister – Come Out and Play (1985) (backing vocals)
- Herman Rarebell – Herman Ze German and Friends (1986) (lead vocals on I'll Say Goodbye, Destiny, and Hard Sensation)
- Munetaka Higachi with Dream Castle – Free World (1997) (lead vocals on Tell Me True)
- Vanden Plas – Spirit of Live (2000) (lead vocals on Kiss of Death)
- Eizo Sakamoto – Shout Drunker (2002) (lead vocals on Crescent Moon)
- Kelly Keeling – Giving Sight To The Eye (2005) (backing vocals)
- Paris Keeling – End of Ride Revisited (2009) (lead vocals on I've Found, Tears Of Heaven)
- United Rockers 4U – One Family (2011)
- Alex De Rosso – Lions & Lambs (2013) (lead vocals on Disappear)
- Herman Rarebell & Friends – Acoustic Fever (2013) (lead vocals on You Give Me All I Need)
- Herman Rarebell – Herman's Scorpions Songs (2014) (lead vocals on You Give Me All I Need)
- Wolfpakk (Michael Voss & Mark Sweeney) – Rise of The Animal (2014) (lead vocals on Running out of Times)
- D.H. Cooper – Destiny (2015) (lead vocals on 'I'll Say Goodbye', 'Hard Sensation' and Destiny)

=== Production ===
- Great White – Out of the Night (1983)
- Antix – Get Up, Get Happy (1984)
- XYZ – XYZ (1989)
- Saint Vitus – C.O.D. (1992)
- Maxx Explosion – Forever (2013)
