= Up from the Ashes (Don Dokken album) =

Studio album by Don Dokken
- Released: August 28, 1990
- Studios: Total Access Recording, Redondo Beach, California
- Genres: Heavy metal; hard rock; Glam metal
- Length: 54:02
- Label: Geffen
- Producers: Don Dokken, Wyn Davis, Tom Zutaut

Don Dokken chronology
Breakin' the Chains (1981)	Up from the Ashes (1990)	Solitary (2008)

Singles from Up from the Ashes
- 1. "Mirror, Mirror" Released: 1990; 2. "Stay" Released: 1990; 3. "Give It Up" Released: 1991

Professional ratings
Review scores
Source	Rating
AllMusic	1.5/5 stars
Collector's Guide to Heavy Metal	6/10
Rock Hard	8/10

Up from the Ashes is the first (Note: Second solo album overall if one counts Breakin' The Chains in 1981 under Don Dokken's moniker name instead of Dokken name in the 1983 reissue/remix.) solo studio album by Don Dokken, best known as the lead singer of American glam metal band Dokken. The sound of the album continues the more commercial sound that Dokken began to incorporate into their music with Under Lock and Key. Whilst working on the album, it was originally intended to be a new Dokken album as a band with a new lineup rather than a solo album, but due to the lawsuit between Don Dokken and his former bandmates, it was released under Don Dokken's name.

The album did not quite achieve the commercial success achieved by Dokken, but it did reach the Top 50 on the Billboard 200 album chart in the US. The line-up for this album consisted of Don Dokken performing vocals, John Norum (formerly of Europe) on lead guitar, Billy White (formerly of Watchtower) on lead guitar, Peter Baltes (formerly of Accept) on bass, and Mikkey Dee (formerly of King Diamond and Motörhead) on drums. The original drummer for the Don Dokken band was Hempo Hildén, formerly in John Norum's band, but he was replaced after a few photo sessions and does not play on the album. The music videos for the songs "Stay" and "Mirror Mirror" received airplay on MTV's Headbangers Ball. "When Love Finds a Fool" was co-written with former Deep Purple and Black Sabbath singer Glenn Hughes, who also provided backing vocals for the song.

For the album, Don Dokken "[had] a rule", that all the band members must live in the same house.

Two singles were released for the album, "Mirror, Mirror" and "Stay". "Give It Up" was released as a promotional single in 1991. The song "Mirror, Mirror" reached #26 on the US Mainstream Rock Chart.

== Track listing ==
No.	Title	Music	Length
1.	"Crash 'N Burn"	Don Dokken, Billy White	5:30
2.	"1000 Miles Away"	Dokken, John Norum	5:00
3.	"When Some Nights"	Dokken, Norum, White	4:27
4.	"Forever"	Dokken, Wyn Davis	5:16
5.	"Living a Lie"	Dokken, Norum	4:38
6.	"When Love Finds a Fool"	Dokken, Glenn Hughes	5:34
7.	"Give It Up"	Dokken, White	4:11
8.	"Mirror Mirror"	Dokken, White, Mark Spiro	4:36
9.	"Stay"	Dokken, Mick Brown	4:28
10.	"Down in Flames"	Dokken, White	5:11
11.	"The Hunger"	Dokken, White	5:03

== Personnel ==
- Don Dokken – lead vocals, guitars
- John Norum – lead guitars, backing vocals
- Billy White – lead guitars
- Peter Baltes – bass guitar, backing vocals
- Mikkey Dee – drums, percussion

Additional musicians

- Glenn Hughes – backing vocals on "When Love Finds a Fool"
- Tony Franklin – bass intro on "Stay"
- Ken Mary – drums on "The Hunger"
- Patrick Young – bass on Mirror Mirror

Production

- Wyn Davis – producer, engineer
- Eddie Ashworth, Melissa Sewell – engineers
- George Marino – mastering at Sterling Sound, New York
- Glen LaFerman - photography
- Gabrielle Raumberger – art coordinator
- Greg Stata - art direction
- David E. Williams – cover art
- Tom Zutaut – executive producer

== Charts ==
Chart (1990)	Peak position
Japanese Albums (Oricon)	18
Swedish Albums (Sverigetopplistan)	27
Swiss Albums (Schweizer Hitparade)	38
US Billboard 200	50
