= XYZ (French band) =

French-American hard rock band

- Whisky a Go Go window with XYZ logo, circa 1988

Background information
- Origin: Lyon, France
- Genres: Hard rock, glam metal
- Years active: 1978–1993; sporadically 2000–present
- Labels: Enigma, Axe Killer, Capitol
- Members: Terry Ilous; Pat Fontaine; Tony Marcus; Joey Shapiro
- Past members: Bobby Pieper; Joey Pafumi; Mark Diglio; Paul Monroe; Paul Villet; Uncle RV
- Website: officialxyz.com

XYZ is a hard rock band. It was originally formed in 1978 in Lyon, France, where Pat Fontaine and Terry Ilous were born and grew up. The first members were Paul Villet on drums, Uncle RV on guitars and Pat Fontaine on vocals and bass. After a few shows as a trio through western Europe and even New York's CBGB, Terry Ilous joined as the lead vocalist, cementing XYZ as a four-piece, and in 1984 the band moved to Los Angeles. Both Villet and RV bowed out a few months later and were replaced by Robert Pieper from New Haven, Connecticut, on guitars and Joe Pafumi from Boston, Massachusetts, on drums.

XYZ started off as the unofficial house band of the Whisky a Go Go nightclub in Los Angeles. A tour of the US with Ted Nugent followed the success of their 1989 Enigma-released debut album, which included one of their best-known songs "Inside Out", and they were signed by major label Capitol for their 1991 follow-up Hungry. XYZ disbanded in 1992 but has reunited occasionally since the early 2000s.

== History ==
XYZ originally formed in Lyon, France in 1978, but relocated to Los Angeles, California, in 1984 where they experienced much of their success. XYZ sold more than two million records worldwide and was a staple on MTV during the early 1990s. The band played Hollywood clubs throughout the mid-1980s and first got a record deal in 1989 with Don Dokken (frontman of Dokken and similarly responsible for the success of Great White) as a producer. Terry Ilous and Pat Fontaine then recruited Marc Diglio (guitars) and Paul Monroe (drums) to replace the departing Pieper and Pafumi, to record the debut album, simply titled XYZ, released in 1989 and containing the hits "Inside Out" and "What Keeps Me Loving You". Videos for both songs received reasonable airplay leaving the album to reach No. 99 on the Billboard 200. A third single from the album, "Maggy", was used in the 1990 Dolph Lundgren movie I Come in Peace.

The next album, Hungry, released in 1991, had less commercial success, not charting at all. Just one video was released, "Face Down in the Gutter", directed by Michael Bay. A few months later, both Diglio and Monroe left the band and were replaced by Tony Marcus and Joey Shapiro, respectively. After the next tour (Foreigner) was finished, band members went separate ways once again. They reunited in 2008 with the 1992 lineup of Ilous, Fontaine, Marcus and Shapiro.

In 1995, Fontaine (bass) and Shapiro (drums) teamed up with Lance Bulen (guitars and vocals) to form the trio Puzzle Gut, which was signed to Interscope Records two years later. Only one album was released while on the road with the Roar Tour, with Iggy Pop headlining.

=== Recent events ===
XYZ actively continues to play festivals and shows across the US and Europe,m and is a regular addition to Monster of Rock Cruises out of Miami, Florida. In addition to fronting XYZ, Terry Ilous leads The Vagabonds, an acoustic outfit mixing flamenco with classic rock.

Ilous was interviewed by the Argentinean rock journalist Lucas H. Gordon, where the singer talked about a charity event called '80's Rockers for Japan', organized by Ilous to raise money for the Red Cross from Japan, to help victims of the 2011 earthquake and tsunami. The event featured many hard rock musicians, including ex-Toto singer Bobby Kimball, Paul Shortino, Rudy Sarzo, Michael T. Ross, John Payne, Carmine Appice, Vinny Appice, Lorraine Lewis, and others.

XYZ performed at Rocklahoma Festival in 2008, the M3 Rock Festival, the Merriweather Post Pavilion, in Columbia, Maryland, and Firefest, at Rock City, in Nottingham, England, in 2012.

In 2012, drummer Joey Shapiro purchased drumstick and guitar pick grip company Gorilla Snot, and since 2019 owns Avalanche Studios, a recording facility in Denver, Colorado.

Fontaine was featured in the opening scene of The Dirt, a Netflix movie about Mötley Crüe.

Paul Monroe, drummer from the classic lineup, was a contestant with his daughter on a 2016 episode of That Awkward Game Show on Spike TV.

In April 2025, Terry Ilous (lead singer) was featured in a Starbucks commercial along his Legends-of-Classic-Rock bandmates.

== Members ==
Current members

- Pat Fontaine – bass (1978–1993, 2003–present), vocals (1978–1980)
- Terry Ilous – vocals (1980–1993, 2000, 2002–present)
- Tony Marcus – guitar (1991–1993, 2000, 2002–present)
- Joey Shapiro – drums (1991–1993, 2000, 2002–present)

Former members

- Uncle RV – guitar (1978–1983)
- JP Villet – drums (1978–1983)
- Jamie Lewis – keyboard (1984–1986)
- Bill Lordan – drums (1984–1986)
- Bobby Pieper – guitar (1984–1988)
- Joey Pafumi – drums (1986–1988)
- Marc Diglio – guitar (1988–1991)
- Tony Burnett - guitar (1990–1993)
- Paul Monroe – drums (1988–1991, 2003)
- Sean McNabb – bass (2002)

== Discography ==
=== Studio albums ===
| Year | Album details | Peak positions |
| Year | Album details | US |
|---|---|---|
| 1989 | XYZ: Release date: October 17, 1989; Label: Enigma Records | 99 |
| 1991 | Hungry: Release date: September 3, 1991; Label: Capitol/EMI America | — |
| 2003 | Letter to God: Release date: May 13, 2003; Label: MTM Music / FYCO Records | — |
"—" denotes releases that did not chart

=== Extended plays ===
| Year | Album details | Peak positions |
| Year | Album details | US |
|---|---|---|
| 1983 | XYZ (EP): Release date: 1983; Label: self-released | |

=== Compilation albums ===
| Year | Album details |
|---|---|
| 2005 | Rainy Days (demos): Release date: May 14, 2005; Label: unofficial release |
| 2005 | Forbidden Demos: Release date: November 14, 2005; Label: FYCO Records |
| 2008 | Best of XYZ: Release date: October 7, 2008; Label: Perris / FYCO Records |

=== Live albums ===
| Year | Album details |
|---|---|
| 1995 | Take What You Can Live: Release date: 1995; Label: FYCO Records |
| 1997 | Take What You Can Live (European Edition): Release date: 1997; Label: Axe Killer |
