= Hungry (XYZ album) =

Studio album by XYZ
- Released: 1991
- Genres: Hard rock, heavy metal
- Label: Capitol
- Producers: George Tutko, Neil Kernon

XYZ chronology
XYZ (1989)	Hungry (1991)	Letter to God (2003)

Singles from XYZ
- 1. "Face Down in the Gutter" Released: 1991; 2. "When I Find Love" Released: 1991

Hungry is the second studio album by the American band XYZ, released in 1991. The band supported the album by touring with Foreigner.

== Critical reception ==
Professional ratings
Review scores
Source	Rating
AllMusic	3/5 stars
Calgary Herald	D
Chicago Tribune	1/4 stars
Metal Hammer	3/5 stars

The Calgary Herald wrote that "XYZ churn out an effort as simple as A,B,C and the tunes are about as elementary too." The Record opined that "what makes XYZ palatable is the almost total lack of pretense surrounding the group's words and music... For these guys, it is only rock-and-roll and there's much to like in the way they play it."

== Track listing ==
1. "Face Down in the Gutter"
2. "Don't Say No"
3. "Fire and Water"
4. "When the Night Comes Down"
5. "Off to the Sun"
6. "Feels Good"
7. "Shake Down the Walls"
8. "When I Find Love"
9. "H.H. Boogie"
10. "The Sun Also Rises in Hell"
11. "A Roll of the Dice"
12. "Whiskey on a Heartache"
13. "Two Wrongs Can Make a Right" (bonus track)
