= Amir Gwirtzman =

Israeli musician, composer, and producer (born 1965)

Amir Gwirtzman אמיר גבירצמן
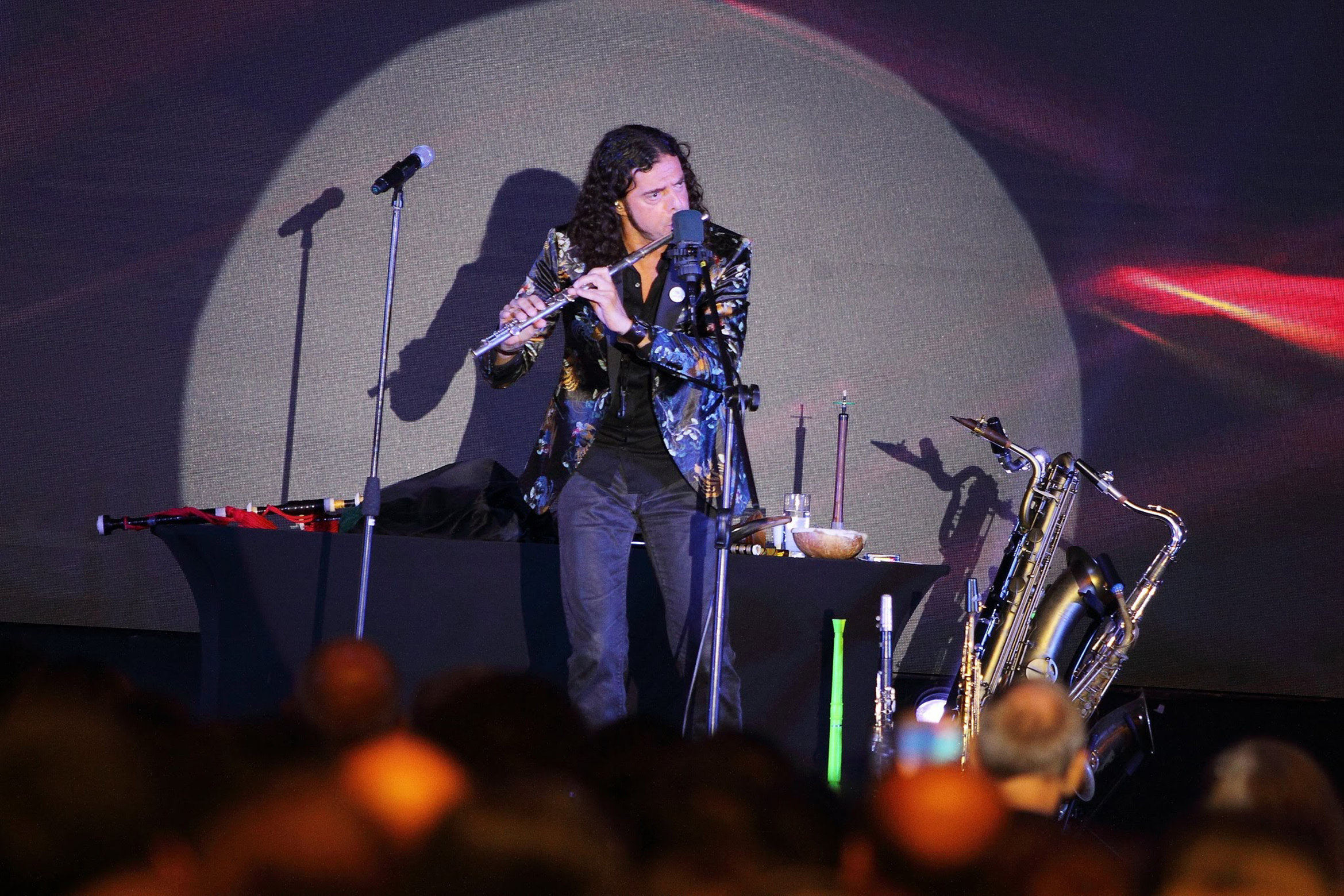
- Gwirtzman performing in Manila, Philippines, 2018

Background information
- Born: August 28, 1965 (age 60); Tel Aviv, Israel
- Genres: Jazz, World music
- Occupations: musician, multi-instrumentalist, composer, and producer
- Instruments: Saxophones, clarinets, flutes, indigenous woodwinds including bagpipes, duduk, zurna, and shofar

Amir Gwirtzman (Hebrew: אמיר גבירצמן; born in 1965 in Tel Aviv) is a musician, multi-instrumentalist, composer and producer. The New York Jewish Week of The Times of Israel described him as one of Israel's leading jazz musicians and "a kind of cultural ambassador for the Jewish state". He is also one of the few musicians in the world who mastered more than 20 woodwind instruments from various cultures and places: Saxophones, Clarinet, Bass Clarinet, Flute, Bagpipes, Zornas, Duduk, Arghul, Quena, Piri, Shofar, and Indian, Irish, Vietnamese, Arabic, and Chinese flutes, and many others. In honor of 60 years of diplomatic relations between the Kingdom of Thailand and the state of Israel, the Thailand post issued a special edition of postal stamps with Amir Gwirtzman as a notable Israeli musician. Gwirtzman has been described by Chicago Tribune's Jazz critic Howard Reich as a "charming anomaly in Jazz" whose music makes "epochs speaking to one another as he switches between one instrument and the other".

== Early life ==
Gwirtzman was born on August 28, 1965, in Tel Aviv, Israel to a ballet dancer and teacher mother and a civil engineer father. He started playing the recorder at age of 7, then the clarinet at the age of 9, followed by the tenor saxophone at the age of 16. Along the years Gwirtzman mastered over 20 woodwind instruments. In 1983, he started his three years mandatory army service playing saxophone in the Israeli Air force band, where he met his fellow musician members with whom they formed the media acclaimed World music/Jazz band Esta. Between 1991 and 1997, Amir lived in Manhattan, New York and studied music at Mannes College of Music.

== Career ==
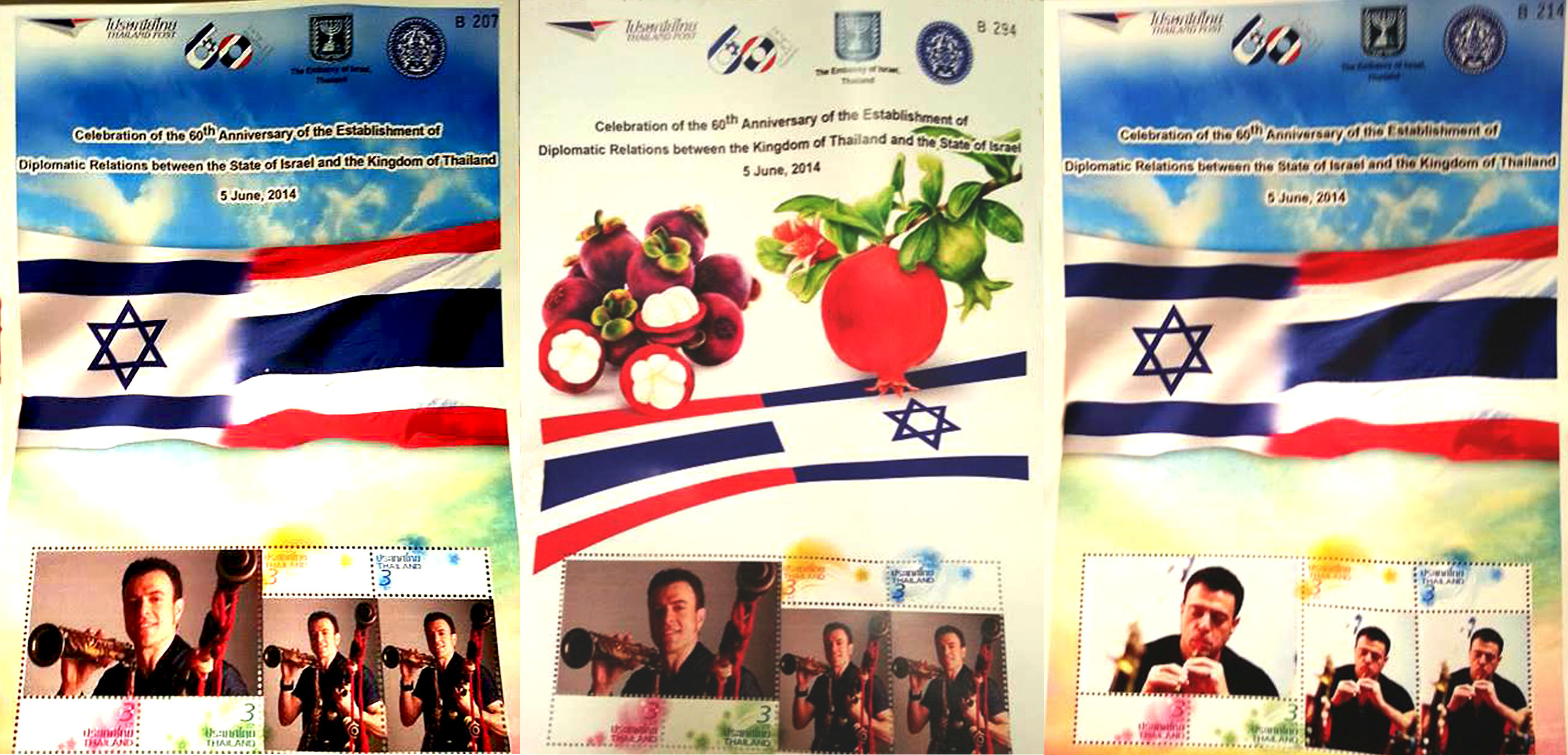
2014 Thailand post stamps honoring Amir Gwirtzman celebrating the 60th Anniversary of the Establishment of The Diplomatic Relations between Israel and Thailand

After the army service, at the age of 23, Gwirtzman started recording on dozens of albums, performing and touring with Israel's top artists such as Ofra Haza, Shlomo Artzi, Matti Caspi, Arik Einstein, Rita and Rami Kleinstein. At the same time with the band Esta he released 3 albums and performed all over the world, including the White House in Washington DC for U.S. President Bill Clinton (1998) and in Thailand for the Thai royal family (in 2008). He also performed at the prestigious Blue Note Jazz club in New York, the House of Blues in Los Angeles, and Kennedy center in Washington DC. Gwirtzman appeared on many TV live concerts and performances, and performed as a soloist with the Jerusalem symphonic orchestra and the Bangkok symphonic orchestra. He is invited to perform by Israeli Embassies world-wide (e.g. in Croatia, Greece, Colombia).

== Solo project career ==
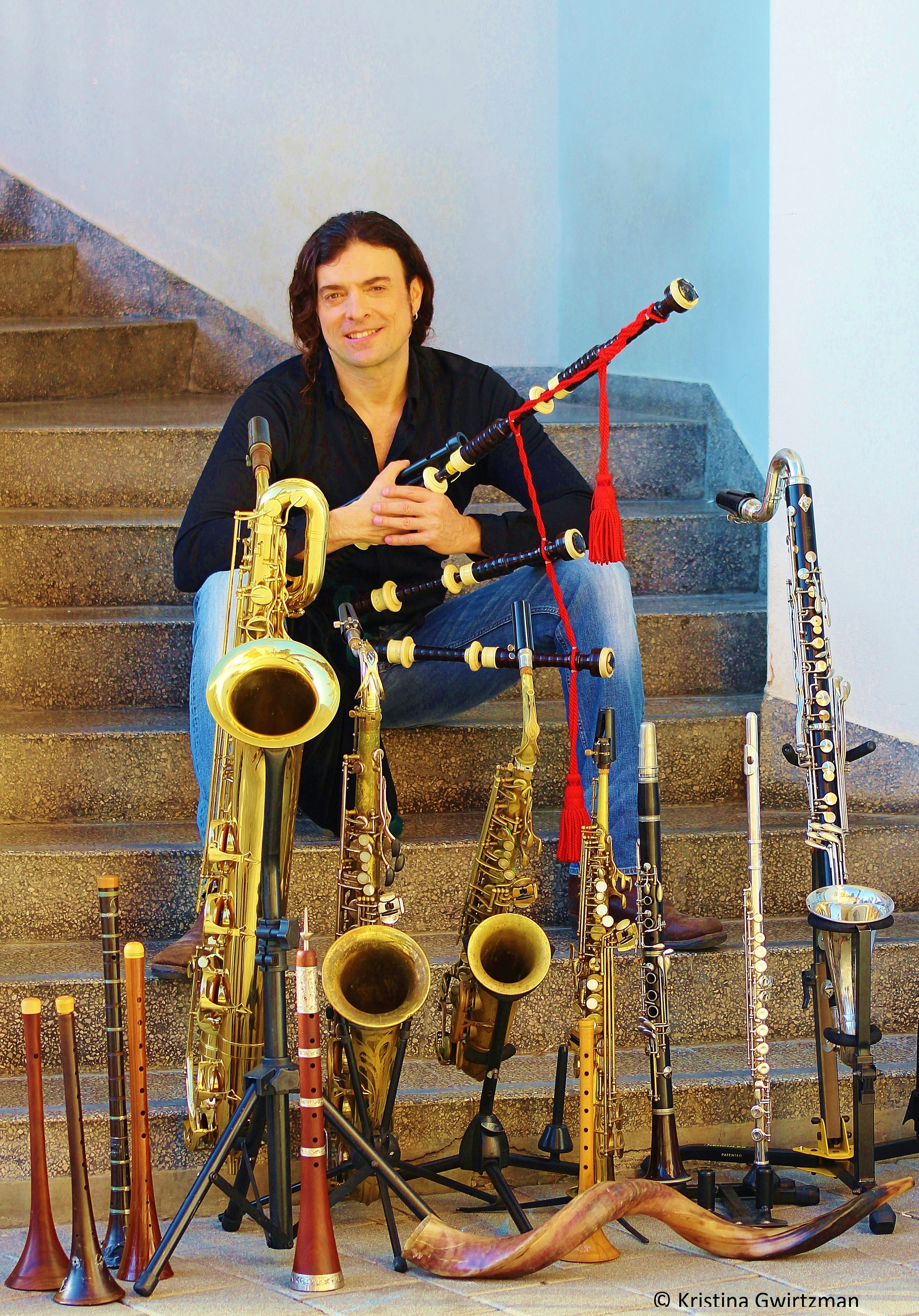
Amir Gwirtzman in Tel Aviv with the musical instruments he plays. Photo: Kristina Gwirtzman.

Gwirtzman started his solo project "Inhale-Exhale" in November 2008, surrounded by more than 20 woodwind and reed instruments. Using a loop station he records himself live on stage. He orchestrates, arranges and builds up textures such as big band sound or symphonic orchestras, all performed by himself using the various acoustic woodwinds. The project has been described as a metaphor for our globalized world. "Inhale-Exhale" has been invited to participate in Jazz and world music festivals and solo concerts in numerous countries around the world. After the first solo album (Inhale-Exhale) premiere concert in the Tel Aviv Museum of arts in 2010, Markercafe magazine's critic Elad Alon wrote that "he alone manages to build a world in its fullness on stage".

In 2010 he was invited by the Charles and Lynn Schusterman foundation as a Visiting Artist, with his solo project, to tour across 13 states in the American south, for 4 months, and 3 months yet again the following year, back by demand (altogether more than 150 concerts, workshops and master classes). It included Festival International de Louisiane in Lafayette Louisiana, the BB King museum in Indianola Mississippi (BB King's hometown), and at the Jazz Hall of fame in Tulsa Oklahoma. The tour was covered by a special documentary made by NPR TV Alabama.

His live performance has inspired the artist Lewis Achenbach to create a series of his portraits during the Israeli Jazz Festival in Chicago in 2013. Gwirtzman has been interviewed on TV and radio.

== Honors ==
- 2017: Official Endorsement for the P. Mauriat Saxophones maker company
- 2015: Rabinovich foundation for arts support
- 2007: Ambassador of goodwill (presented by the Embassy of Israel in Vietnam)
- 2010: Received the Key to the city and an honorary citizen certificate, from the Mayor of Lake-Charles, Louisiana
- 2013: "Connected" short documentary film by Ziggy Livnat, was awarded for the music, composed by Amir Gwirtzman
- 2014: An official stamp with Gwirtzman on it, was issued by the Thai Postal services, following a special concert in honor of the 60th anniversary of diplomatic relations between the Kingdom of Thailand and the state of Israel

== Discography ==
Solo albums

- Inhale-Exhale - virtual label (2010)
- Babel-Gumbo (Inhale-Exhale 2), NarRator Records (2017)

Collaborations

- Shlomo Artzi - חום יולי אוגוסט, Hed Arzi (1988)
- Zvi Booms - מקומות אחרים, MCI (1989)
- Shlomo Artzi - כרטיס ללונה פארק, Hed Arzi (1990)
- Esta - Esta, MCI records (1990)
- Rami Kleistein - אהביני, Helicon records (1991)
- Yehuda Poliker - לעיניך הכחולות, NMC (1992)
- Shlomo Artzi - האוסף המשולש, Hed Arzi (1993)
- Esta - Mediterranean crossroads- Newance label, Newance (1996)
- Arik Einstein & Shalom Hanoch - Muscat, NMC (1999 )
- Rita - תפתח חלון - Helicon Records (1999)
- Rami Kleinstein - תגיד את זה - Helicon records (2000)
- Esta - Home made world, Newance label, NMC (2002)
- Shlomi Shabat - זמן אהבה, NMC united entertainment Ltd (2003)
- Dudu Tasa - מתוך בחירה, Hed Artzi (2003)
- Alon Olearchik - Once upon a time in the Galilee - NMC United entertainment Ltd (2003)
- Gidi Gov - בקצה ההר, NMC (2005)
- Rita - ONE - Nana disc (2006)
- Manou Gallo - Lowlin, IglooMondo (2009)
- Sleeping Camels- "Wake up", NarRator Records (2010)
- Shlomi Shabat - אחד לנשמה אחד למסיבה, NMC (2012)
- Mokoomba - Rising Tide, Igloo (2012)
- Between Friends: Tribute To Jerzy Milian, Wytwórnia (2014)
- Naked - Nakedonia, NarRator Records (2015)
- Doron Raphaeli - Bet Aba (2017)
- Tihomir Pop Asanovic - Povratak prvoj ljubavi, Croatia Records (2019)
- Bernard Maseli - Drifter, Polish Jazz Masters / Warner Music (2021)
- The isolation band - Jazz favorites 2 - Leibla Music Ltd. (2021)
