= Andy Kuntz =

German singer

- Born: 20 November 1962 (age 62); Kaiserslautern, Germany
- Origin: Kaiserslautern, Germany
- Genres: Progressive metal, progressive rock, musical
- Instrument: Vocals
- Years active: 1986–Present
- Labels: Frontiers Records, InsideOut
- Website: VandenPlas.de

Andy Kuntz (born 20 November 1962) is a German progressive metal singer best known for his work with the band Vanden Plas. He has also participated in a production of the musical Jesus Christ Superstar.

== Background ==
Kuntz was born in Kaiserslautern, Germany. Since age 14, he has been interested in singing and he always wanted to be a "big rock star". When he was a teenager, he was in a garage punk rock band called Rock Zock. He has said his main influences are Kansas, Thin Lizzy, Van Halen, Genesis, Magnum, and Sting. Kuntz is a first cousin of former German national association football player Stefan Kuntz.

== Formation of Vanden Plas ==
When Kuntz was in school, drummer Andreas Lill heard Kuntz singing in his punk band, Rock Zock. Kuntz did not like the kind of music that Rock Zock was playing, and Lill asked him to sing for his band, which was called Exodus at the time. When the question of a new name came up, they were inspired by a car maker they saw (Vanden Plas), and they thought that it would be an interesting band name.

== Discography ==
=== With Vanden Plas ===
- Colour Temple (1994)
- AcCult (1996, acoustic EP)
- The God Thing (1997)
- Far Off Grace (1999)
- Spirit of Live (2000, live album)
- Beyond Daylight (2002)
- Christ 0 (2006)
- The Seraphic Clockwork (2010)
- The Chronicles of the Immortals: Netherworld (Path I) (2014)
- The Chronicles of the Immortals: Netherworld (Path II) (2015)
- The Ghost Xperiment: Awakening (2019)
- The Ghost Xperiment: Illumination (2020)
- The Empyrean Equation of the Long Lost Things (2024)

=== With Abydos ===
- Abydos: The Little Boy's Heavy Mental Shadow Opera About the Inhabitants of His Diary (2004)

=== With Missa Mercuria ===
- Missa Mercuria (2002)

=== With All My Shadows ===
- Eerie Monsters (2023)
