= Stephan Lill =

German guitarist (born 1968)

- Born: 30 November 1968 (age 57)
- Origin: Eitorf, Germany
- Genres: Progressive Metal, Progressive rock, Heavy metal
- Occupation: Musician
- Instrument: Guitar
- Years active: 1984-Present
- Labels: Frontier Records, InsideOut Records
- Website: VandenPlas.com

Stephan Lill is a German guitarist best known for his work with the Progressive metal band Vanden Plas.

== Biography ==
Stephan Lill was born on 30 November 1968 in Eitorf, Germany. His interest in music, and especially in playing guitar, was awakened early with his discovery of AC/DC and their outstanding lead guitarist Angus Young when he was 12.

At age 15, Stephan joined the band Vanden Plas. Since then, he has released 11 CDs worldwide with Vanden Plas, and performed in shows and tours in Europe and the US with bands including Dream Theater, Savatage, and Angra.

As both guitarist and songwriter, Stephan collaborated in projects with Missa Mercuria and the Consortium Project. In addition, to date, he and his Vanden Plas bandmates have composed 4 rock operas (Ludus Danielis, Christ 0, Everyman, Chronicles of the Immortals), which were performed at the Staatstheater am Gärtnerplatz/Munich, Theater Münster, Pfalztheater Kaiserslautern, Theater Pforzheim and the Tiroler Landestheater Innsbruck.

As a guitarist, Stephan has played throughout Germany in musicals including Jesus Christ Superstar, Little Shop of Horrors, Chess, Evita, and Rocky Horror Picture Show, to name a few. In 2010, Stephan performed together with the Dortmund Philharmonic Orchestra in the German premiere of Yaron Gottfried's Concerto for Electric Guitar, String Orchestra and Percussion. The American-based company TTM Guitars was so impressed with Stephan's playing that it has been building signature guitars for him since 2011.

Some of the bands Stephan likes to listen to are Blue Murder, In Flames, Metallica, Dream Theater, Slipknot, Ill Niño, Dokken, Ozzy Osbourne, Whitesnake, House of Lords, and AC/DC. Other works from Stephan can be found on Missa Mercuria and the Consortium Project.

== Instruments ==
=== Guitars ===
- Hagstrom Northern Series Super Swede Black
- TTM Supershop Devastator

TTM Stephan Lill Signature Series

- Gibson Les Paul Studio (winered, VP, tuning: Eb)
- Gibson Les Paul Custom (black, VP, tuning:Eb)
- Epiphone Les Paul Custom (white, Theatre, tuning: 440 Hz)
- Peavey Vandenberg Quilt Top (winered, VP, tuning: Eb)
- Peavey V-Type Custom (purple, VP, tuning: Eb)
- Ibanez Custom USA (petrol, Theatre, tuning: 443 Hz)
- Ibanez RG 570 (yellow, Theatre, tuning: 440 Hz)
- Ibanez RG 550 (red, Theatre, tuning: 443 Hz)
- Yamaha Pacifica USA Custom 2 (natural, VP, tuning: 440 Hz)
- Yamaha Pacifia 812 D (natural, VP, tuning: Eb)
- Yamaha Pacifia 812 D (natural, VP, tuning: D)
- Yamaha Drop 6 (black, VP, tuning: Bb)
- Yamaha APX 10 A (Western, natural, VP, tuning: Eb)
- Yamaha DW 4 (Western, natural, VP, tuning: Eb)
- Yamaha GC-31 (Acoustic, natural, VP, tuning: Eb)

=== Amps ===
- Engl Special Edition Preamp E 570
- Engl Tube Poweramp E 840/50
- Engl Cabinet 4x12" Pro Cabinet E 412 VS
- Marshall JVM410H

== Discography ==
=== With Vanden Plas ===
- 1994 - Colour Temple
- 1997 - The God Thing
- 1999 - Far Off Grace
- 2000 - Spirit of Live (live)
- 2002 - Beyond Daylight
- 2006 - Christ 0
- 2010 - The Seraphic Clockwork
- 2014 - Chronicles of The Immortals - Netherworld, Path 1
- 2015 - Chronicles of The Immortals - Netherworld II
- 2017 - The Seraphic Live works (Live CD/DVD)
- 2019 - The Epic Works 1991 - 2015 (Box Set)
- 2019 - The Ghost Xperiment - Awakening

=== With Missa Mercuria ===
- Missa Mercuria (2002)

=== With Consortium Project ===
- 1999 - Criminals & Kings
- 2001 - Continuum in Extremis
- 2003 - Terra Incognita (The Undiscovered World)
- 2011 - Species
- 2026 - Legacy of Empires
