= The Very Beast of Dio Vol. 2 =

Greatest hits album by Dio
- Released: October 9, 2012
- Recorded: 1996–2010
- Genre: Heavy metal
- Length: 78:21
- Label: Niji Entertainment
- Producer: Ronnie James Dio, Wendy Dio

Dio compilations chronology
The Ronnie James Dio Story: Mightier Than the Sword (2011)	The Very Beast of Dio Vol. 2 (2012)	Snapshot (2013)

The Very Beast of Dio Vol. 2 is a posthumous compilation album by American heavy metal band Dio. It is a followup to The Very Beast of Dio, a compilation album released in 2000 featuring tracks from Dio's first six studio albums and live EP. Vol. 2 picks up where the previous album left off, including tracks from the band's seventh through tenth studio albums.

Unlike its predecessor, which was only available in the United States and Canada, Vol. 2 had a worldwide release. The album was released on October 9, 2012.

== Promotion ==
Eddie Trunk, radio host and longtime friend of Ronnie James Dio, provided liner notes for the release. In addition, the album was heavily promoted on Trunk's radio program as well as his VH1 Classic program, That Metal Show.

The album was made available for streaming on the official Ronnie James Dio webstore on August 7, 2012.

== Reception ==
Professional ratings
Review scores
Source	Rating
Allmusic	3.5/5 stars
Blabbermouth.net	9/10 stars
About.com	3.5/5 stars
Metal Forces	(8.5/10)
Record Collector	3/5 stars

Since its release, this compilation album has been met with mostly positive reviews. William Clark of Guitar International wrote that "This new release captures both of these of extreme emotions that drenched Dio’s later efforts and brings them together fabulously on one disc". Chad Bowar of About.com said that "The Very Beast Of Dio Vol 2 isn't essential, but is a very good collection of Dio's later material".

== Track listing ==
No.	Title	Writer(s)	Original release	Length
1.	"Killing the Dragon"	Ronnie James Dio, Jimmy Bain	Killing the Dragon (2002)	4:25
2.	"Push"	Dio, Bain, Craig Goldy	Killing the Dragon	4:08
3.	"The Eyes"	Dio, Goldy	Master of the Moon (2004)	6:27
4.	"Along Comes a Spider"	Dio, Doug Aldrich, Bain	Killing the Dragon	3:32
5.	"Better in the Dark"	Dio, Bain	Killing the Dragon	3:43
6.	"Fever Dreams"	Dio	Magica (2000)	4:37
7.	"Black"	Dio, Tracy Grijalva, Vinny Appice, Jeff Pilson	Angry Machines (1996)	3:06
8.	"Feed My Head"	Dio, Goldy	Magica	5:39
9.	"Shivers"	Dio, Goldy	Master of the Moon	4:15
10.	"Hunter of the Heart" (live)	Dio, Grijalva, Appice	Inferno: Last in Live (1998), studio version from Angry Machines	5:15
11.	"One More for the Road"	Dio, Goldy	Master of the Moon	3:18
12.	"Lord of the Last Day"	Dio	Magica	4:04
13.	"Electra" (bonus track)	Dio	single from the Tournado Box Set (2010)	6:26
14.	"As Long as It's Not About Love"	Dio, Goldy	Magica	6:04
15.	"This Is Your Life"	Dio, Grijalva	Angry Machines	3:18
16.	"Metal Will Never Die" (bonus track)	David Feinstein	guest appearance on the David "Rock" Feinstein album Bitten by the Beast (2010)	5:20
17.	"The Prisoner of Paradise" (bonus track)	Dio, Goldy	Japanese edition of Master of the Moon	4:01

== Credits ==
- Ronnie James Dio - vocals, keyboards
- Tracy G - guitars on tracks 7, 10, 15
- Craig Goldy - guitars on track 3, 6, 8, 9, 11, 12, 14, 17
- Doug Aldrich - guitars on track 1, 2, 4, 5, 13
- David "Rock" Feinstein - guitars on track 16
- Jeff Pilson - bass on tracks 3, 7, 9, 11, 15, 17, keyboards on tracks 3, 9, 11, 17
- Larry Dennison - bass on track 10
- Jimmy Bain - bass on tracks 1, 2, 4, 5, 6, 8, 12, 14
- Rudy Sarzo - bass on track 13
- Garry Bordonaro - bass on track 16
- Simon Wright - drums
- Vinny Appice - drums on tracks 7, 10 and 15
- Carl Canedy - drums on track 16
- Scott Warren - keyboards
- All tracks produced by Ronnie James Dio and engineered by Wyn Davis, except:
  - "Metal Will Never Die" - produced by David Feinstein and mixed by Alex Perialas
  - "Hunter of the Heart" (live) - engineered by Moray McMillan and Martin Rowe
- Wyn Davis - remastering
- Wendy Dio - executive producer
