= Strange Highways =

Studio album by Dio
- Released: October 25, 1993
- Studio: Rumbo Recorders (Los Angeles)
- Genre: Heavy metal
- Length: 53:36
- Labels: Reprise; Vertigo
- Producer: Mike Fraser

Dio chronology
| Lock Up the Wolves (1990) | Strange Highways (1993) | Angry Machines (1996) |

Ronnie James Dio chronology
| Dehumanizer (1992) | Strange Highways (1993) | Angry Machines (1996) |

Strange Highways is the sixth studio album by American heavy metal band Dio, released on October 25, 1993, through Vertigo Records in Europe, and on January 26, 1994, through Reprise Records in the U.S. It was the band’s first album since Ronnie James Dio and Vinny Appice's reunion tour with Black Sabbath, and the first to feature guitarist Tracy Grijalva and bassist Jeff Pilson. Recorded at Rumbo Recorders in Los Angeles, California, the album was produced, mixed, and engineered by Mike Fraser, while its cover art was designed by Wil Rees.

Upon release, the album would receive generally positive reviews from critics, but showed a continued commercial decline, debuting at No. 142 on the Billboard 200. This decline would continue throughout the 1990’s until the release of Magica in 2000.

== Background and recording ==
In 1992, the English Rock band Black Sabbath would release Dehumanizer, which was the first album to feature Dio and Appice since 1981’s Mob Rules. The album notably had a troubled production, as songs had to be rewritten multiple times. Despite this, it was Black Sabbath’s biggest commercial success in a decade, and would shortly thereafter launch a tour to further capitalize on this success. During the tour, however, Dio would leave the band a second time after the band was invited by Ozzy Osbourne to perform on his No More Tours tour. Following the short-lived reunion, Dio and Appice returned to Dio's solo group, hiring Tracy Grijalva as new guitarist. Former Dio bassist Jimmy Bain was to make a return to the band, but he was soon sacked by Dio and replaced by Jeff Pilson.

Parts of "Hollywood Black" were demoed by Black Sabbath during the Dehumanizer sessions. "Whether it's the same, I don't know…" Tony Iommi remarked of Dio's version (before hearing it). "Could be the same lyrics – probably is. I wouldn't think he would use the same music."

== Critical reception ==
Professional ratings
Review scores
| Source | Rating |
|---|---|
| AllMusic | 3/5 stars |
| Collector's Guide to Heavy Metal | 8/10 |
| Entertainment Weekly | B− |

Strange Highways received generally favorable reviews from critics. Allmusic reviewer Jason Anderson would compliment Dio’s vocals and Grijalva’s guitar playing, and described the album as a “solid effort”.

== Track listing ==
All lyrics are written by Ronnie James Dio; all music is composed by Dio, Vinny Appice, Tracy Grijalva, and Jeff Pilson, except where noted.

Strange Highways track listing
| No. | Title | Music | Length |
|---|---|---|---|
| 1. | "Jesus, Mary & the Holy Ghost" | Dio, Grijalva, Pilson | 4:13 |
| 2. | "Firehead" | | 4:06 |
| 3. | "Strange Highways" | | 6:54 |
| 4. | "Hollywood Black" | Dio, Grijalva, Appice | 5:10 |
| 5. | "Evilution" | | 5:37 |
| 6. | "Pain" | Appice, Dio, Grijalva | 4:14 |
| 7. | "One Foot in the Grave" | | 4:01 |
| 8. | "Give Her the Gun" | Dio, Grijalva, Pilson | 5:58 |
| 9. | "Blood from a Stone" | | 4:14 |
| 10. | "Here's to You" | | 3:24 |
| 11. | "Bring Down the Rain" | | 5:45 |

== Personnel ==
Dio

- Ronnie James Dio – vocals
- Tracy G – guitars
- Jeff Pilson – bass, keyboards
- Vinny Appice – drums

Production

- Recorded at Rumbo Recorders, Los Angeles, California
- Produced, engineered and mixed by Mike Fraser
- Assistant engineered by Andy Udoff
- Mixed at Record Plant, Los Angeles, California
- Originally mastered by George Marino at Sterling Sound, New York City
- Cover illustration by Wil Rees
- Sigil design and cover artwork by Ed Holding for Mainartery

== Charts ==
Chart performance for Strange Highways
| Chart (1993) | Peak position |
|---|---|
| German Albums (Offizielle Top 100) | 79 |
| US Billboard 200 | 142 |
