= Yankee Rose =

Yankee Rose may refer to:

- "Yankee Rose", 1926 song recorded by Harry Archer, with music by Abe Frankel and lyrics by Sidney Holden
- Yankee Rose (band), a Los Angeles–based rock band in the 1970s and 1980s
- "Yankee Rose" (song), a 1986 song by David Lee Roth
