= Music of San Gabriel Valley =

The San Gabriel Valley encompasses a large part in the Northeast region of the Greater Los Angeles area. This region played a major role in the music of Los Angeles, and California. The San Gabriel Valley remains home to several influential performing groups, such as, Van Halen, the Pasadena Symphony Orchestra, and the San Gabriel Valley Symphony.

== Genres of Music ==
=== Rock ===
Compared to other parts of Los Angeles, like Silver Lake (where frequent alternative Indie bands play) and Long Beach (where many successful rap, punk, ska and reggae groups originated from), rock music from the San Gabriel Valley included genres of rock music, like, glam metal, heavy metal and hard rock were especially popular between the 1970s and 1990s.

== Notable Local Live Music Performance Groups ==
Pasadena Symphony Orchestra

Rio Hondo Symphony

La Mirada Symphony Orchestra

San Gabriel Valley Symphony

== Notable Musicians and Entertainers ==
Abe Perez - acclaimed drummer from popular 1970's band Yankee Rose, percussionist and endorsed artist.

Alex Van Halen - a Dutch-born American musician, best known as the drummer and co-founder of the hard rock band Van Halen.

Anna Nalick - an American singer-songwriter.

Donny Simmons - guitarist from popular bands from the 1970s and 1980s Yankee Rose and Stormer, who opened for Van Halen.

Joe Marks - bass player from Covina, played with Mötley Crüe's Vince Neil in a previous band named Rockandi. Also played with Posh-Boy recording artists The Wigglers, then replaced Tim Gaines in the popular L.A. Band Stormer. Also played with Charlotte in 1986.

Eddie Van Halen - a Dutch-American musician, songwriter and producer. He is best known as the lead guitarist, occasional keyboardist and co-founder of the hard rock band Van Halen.

Fergie - an American singer, songwriter, fashion designer, television host, and actress. She is the female vocalist for the hip hop group The Black Eyed Peas, with whom she has achieved chart success worldwide.

Greg Camp - an American Grammy Award-nominated songwriter, guitarist and vocalist. He is best known as the founding guitarist and songwriter for the rock band Smash Mouth.

Harry Fox - a vaudeville dancer, actor, and comedian.

Jeremy Masana - bassist from popular band Stormer and the Tracy G Group.

Jim Fuller - a guitarist and co-songwriter of 1960s rock band The Surfaris.

Mr. Capone-E - a rapper and owner of Hi-Power Entertainment. He was also signed with Thump Records, where he released his 2003 album Dedicated 2 the Oldies in which he interpolated songs like "Angel Baby" by Rosie & the Originals.

Steve Hall - drummer from 1980's popular band Stormer

Steve Hall, Jr. - drummer of popular punk rock band se7en4, endorsed artist and son of popular Stormer drummer Steve Hall.

Tim Gaines - an American bass guitarist. He is most known for being the bassist of the Christian metal band Stryper.

Tracy G - former lead guitarist of Dio and main member of the Tracy G Group

Jon Williams - Former lead singer and principal songwriter of The Lost Cause and Band X (with Joe Marks), also fronted Monkey Stu, Vertical Slot and JonKen KindWill - currently Rock Historian at irocku.com

ILYFR - artist and film director also known as Derrick Oliver from Baldwin Park, CA

== Notable Venues ==
Fairplex in Pomona

San Gabriel Mission Playhouse

San Gabriel Valley Music Theatre

Fox Theater in Pomona

Glasshouse in Pomona
