= Donny Simmons =

American guitarist

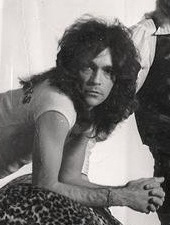
Donny Simmons, American guitarist

Donny Simmons is an American guitarist. He is mostly known for being the guitarist of both bands Stormer and Yankee Rose, bands that were popular in Los Angeles, sharing the stage with Ratt, Quiet Riot, Mötley Crüe, Metallica and Van Halen. Simmons has also been cited as a major influence to Tracy G, the guitarist from Dio. Recently, he has been interviewed for Greg Renoff's popular book, Van Halen Rising.

Simmons is influenced by genres, such as, soul, country and blues. In addition, he cites Chuck Berry, Little Richard, John Lee Hooker, Stevie Wonder, Otis Redding, Robert Johnson as additional musical influences.

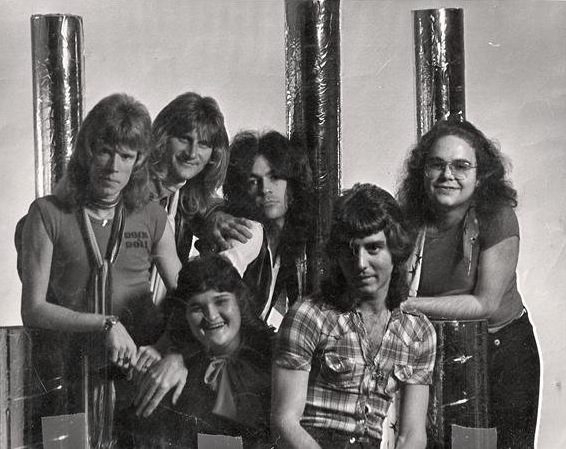
(From left to right) Yankee Rose: Michael Adams, Pete Currier, Donny Simmons, Abe Perez, John Rockwood, and their manager Mo (bottom left)

== Past projects ==
=== Yankee Rose ===
Simmons was the guitarist of Yankee Rose, a popular rock band in the 70s and 80s. Yankee Rose frequently performed at many of the popular clubs in Los Angeles and Hollywood, sharing the stage many notable acts, such as, Movies and Aunti-Up at Hong Kong Cafe, Dolphins, Popsicles, Axis and Smile, and Gilbert Gram at the Troubadour, Erin's All Stars, The Blitz Bros, the Penny's, the Rabble, Wynield, and Obryan, at the Starwood, and Bluebeard at the Whisky a Go Go.

Aside from Simmons, Yankee Rose's other notable members are singer Michael Adams, who is currently performing as 'Mick Adams' in the popular Rolling Stones tribute band 'Mick Adams and the Stones', and drummer Abe Perez who recorded and played with notable Blues guitarist Jay Gordon.

=== Stormer ===
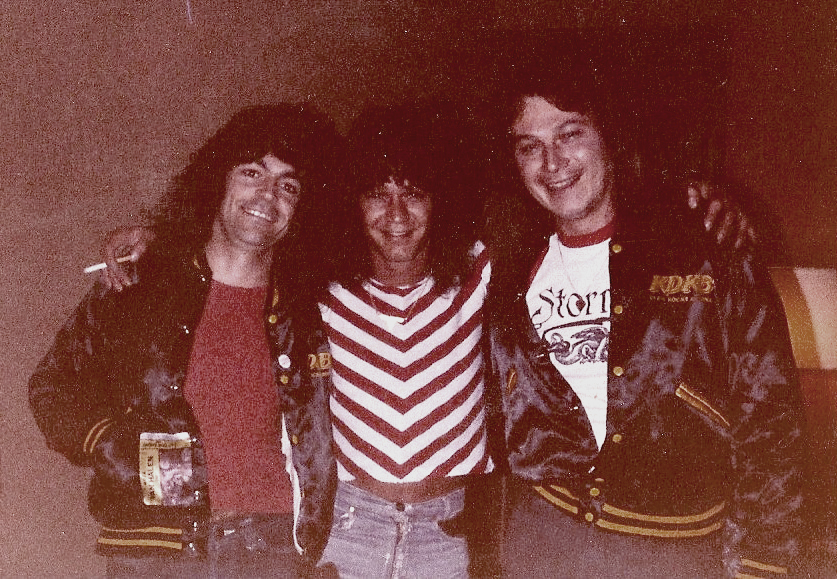
Donny Simmons (left), with Eddie Van Halen (center) of Van Halen and Steve Hall (right) of Stormer.

Stormer was one of the many popular acts that contributed to the music scene of the Sunset Strip, sharing the stage with London, and Stratus, as well as opening up for Van Halen at the Pasadena Civic and the Golden West.

On November 19, 1976, Stormer played a sold-out show with Van Halen and Smile at the Pasadena Civic to a crowd of 3,500 people. At this concert, Marshall Berle was in attendance, who later became Van Halen's manager.

== Recent projects ==
=== Stormer reunion ===
In 2008, when Simmon's former Stormer bandmate, Tim Gaines, was asked if the Stormer demos will be remastered and made public, Gaines replied, "I doubt if anyone can find the Masters. We are talking of having a Stormer reunion in the near future. We may decide to record it."

=== Donny Simmons & Mutts Gone Nuts ===
In 2007, Simmons produced an album of music titled, Donny Simmons & Mutts Gone Nuts. Most of the songs were co-written by Chris Carroll, from the band The Str8jackets.

== Influence and legacy ==
Tracy G, the former guitarist of Dio, gives credit to Donny Simmons for influencing his playing. In Greg Renoff's books Van Halen Rising, Tracy G explained that:

"[Simmons was] a Jimmy Page lookalike who strapped on a low-slung Les Paul and played searing, bluesy solos for the hard rock band Stormer. For Tracy and his guitar-playing friends, the talented Simmons was the 'Guitar God of La Puente, Pomona, and West Covina'. There was nobody better in that part of L.A."

== See also ==
- Music of San Gabriel Valley
- Category:American guitarists
- Van Halen Rising (book)
- Tim Gaines of Stormer and Stryper
- Tracy G
- Stormer
