= Master of the Moon =

Studio album by Dio
- Released: August 30, 2004
- Recorded: Total Access Recording (Redondo Beach, California)
- Genre: Doom metal, heavy metal
- Length: 46:07
- Label: Sanctuary (North America); SPV/Steamhammer (Europe); Victor (Japan)
- Producer: Ronnie James Dio

Dio chronology
Killing the Dragon (2002)	Master of the Moon (2004)	Evil or Divine – Live in New York City (2005)

Professional ratings
Review scores
Source	Rating
AllMusic	3/5 stars
Blabbermouth.net	6.5/10

Master of the Moon is the tenth and final studio album by American heavy metal band Dio. It was released on August 30, 2004 in Europe through SPV/Steamhammer and on September 7, 2004 in the US through Sanctuary Records. It was produced by Ronnie James Dio.

== Background ==
The album marks the return of guitarist Craig Goldy, who performed on Dio's Dream Evil (1987) and Magica (2000). It also features Jeff Pilson on bass, Simon Wright on drums and Scott Warren on keyboards.

"Death by Love" was co-written by former Magica touring bassist Chuck Garric. There are no writing credits in the album's liner notes.

"There's a cynical aspect to some of the lyrics," Dio remarked. "And there's definitely a political tone, reflecting the dangers we face almost every day in modern life."

On the tour for the album, Fireball Ministry and Anthrax opened for Dio. As usual, the band played songs from throughout the singer's career, including ones by Rainbow and Black Sabbath.

Due to other commitments, Pilson was unable to tour the album. Rudy Sarzo took over on bass.

== Reissue ==
In 2019, Master of the Moon was remastered and announced for reissue in 2020. The reissue's first disc is identical to the original North American release. Its second disc contains four live tracks recorded during the Master of the Moon tour, plus "The Prisoner of Paradise", originally included on the Japanese pressing of the album.

== Track listing ==
Bonus track "The Prisoner of Paradise" is on the Japanese pressing of the album. The song would later be featured on the compilation The Very Beast of Dio Vol. 2 and included on the 2020 reissue of the album.

All tracks are written by Ronnie James Dio and Craig Goldy except where noted.

No.	Title	Music	Length
1.	"One More for the Road"		3:18
2.	"Master of the Moon"		4:19
3.	"The End of the World"		4:39
4.	"Shivers"		4:15
5.	"The Man Who Would Be King"		4:58
6.	"The Eyes"		6:27
7.	"Living the Lie"	Dio, Goldy, Simon Wright	4:25
8.	"I Am"		5:00
9.	"Death by Love"	Dio, Goldy, Chuck Garric, Wright	4:21
10.	"In Dreams"		4:26

Japanese edition bonus track
No.	Title	Length
11.	"The Prisoner of Paradise"	4:01

Deluxe edition disc two
No.	Title	Length
1.	"Heaven and Hell" (Live, Master of the Moon Tour 2004/2005)	10:21
2.	"Rainbow in the Dark" (Live, Master of the Moon Tour 2004/2005)	5:22
3.	"Rock and Roll Children" (Live, Master of the Moon Tour 2004/2005)	4:59
4.	"The Eyes" (Live, Master of the Moon Tour 2004/2005)	6:48
5.	"The Prisoner of Paradise"	4:00

== Personnel ==
Dio

- Ronnie James Dio – vocals
- Craig Goldy – guitar, keyboards
- Jeff Pilson – bass
- Simon Wright – drums
- Scott Warren – keyboards

Production

- Recorded at Total Access Recording in Redondo Beach, California
- Produced by Ronnie James Dio
- Engineered by Wyn Davis
- Brian Daughterty, Michael McMullen – assistant engineers
- Eddy Schreyer – mastering
- Cover illustration by Marc Sasso

== Charts ==
Chart performance for Master of the Moon
Chart (2004)	Peak position
Finnish Albums (Suomen virallinen lista)	16
German Albums (Offizielle Top 100)	43
Japanese Albums (Oricon)	259
UK Rock & Metal Albums (OCC)	20
Swedish Albums (Sverigetopplistan)	35

Chart (2020)	Peak position
German Albums (Offizielle Top 100)	62
Scottish Albums (OCC)	97
Spanish Albums (PROMUSICAE)	28
UK Independent Albums (OCC)	39
UK Rock & Metal Albums (OCC)	13
