= Tracy G =

American guitarist (born 1959)

- Born: Tracy Grijalva; January 3, 1959 (age 67); Whittier, California, U.S.
- Genres: Heavy metal
- Occupation: Musician
- Instrument: Guitar
- Member of: Eightball Cholos; Goad-ed
- Formerly of: Dio; Love/Hate; Riff Raff
- Website: tracyg.com

Tracy Grijalva (born January 3, 1959), known as Tracy G, is an American heavy metal guitarist best known for his time with Dio from 1993 to 1999.

== Early life ==
Tracy's first band experience was in band called the Grijalva Brothers with his father as a member. Growing up he had a few guitar instructors, one of them told him that he would have a hard time playing because "his fingers were too small". Grijalva, being the determined musician that he was, would practice until his fingers hurt.

== Influences ==
Tracy gives credit to Eddie Van Halen (Van Halen) and Donny Simmons (Yankee Rose, Stormer) for influencing his playing, especially referring to Simmons as 'his idol'.

== Career ==
He would later play in a variety of bands, including with future member of Great White, Jack Russell. He also put together the bands Love/Hate with singer Jizzy Pearl, and Swift Kick with whom he released an EP "Long Live Rock" in 1984. He would play at almost any club he could find to get his publicity out. He also played with vocalist Rudy Torres and drummer Audie Desbrow (Great White) in Riff Raff, a very popular band around southern California in the early days of hard rock and heavy metal.

Tracy then joined Dio. In his six years with the band, Tracy G was featured on two studio albums, (Strange Highways and Angry Machines), and one live album (Inferno: Last in Live). He left the band in 1999 when he was asked to play rhythm guitar while Craig Goldy took lead. Dio decided to bring back Goldy, who had played with him on the Dream Evil album.

Tracy G formed The Tracy G Group, which included Jeremy Masana on bass guitar, Donnie Rodriguez on drums and, respectively, Tracy G on guitar.

Further, Tracy G is in the band Goad-ed. They have released two albums, and Tracy has released numerous solo albums as well. Tracy is working with members of Barren Cross in a new project called Gale Force. The album is called subhuman and was released in 2021.

== Discography ==
=== Dio ===
- Strange Highways (1993)
- Angry Machines (1996)
- Inferno: Last in Live (1998)
- Live in London, Hammersmith Apollo 1993

=== Swift Kick ===
- Long Live Rock (1984)

=== Rags ===
- Tear 'Em Up (1988; re-released in 2003)

=== WWIII ===
- WWIII (1990)

=== Eightball Cholos ===
- Satan's Whore (1996)

=== Tracy G ===
- The G Factory (1997)
- Compilation Volume I (1999)
- Baron Von Troglenstein (1999)
- A Spooky G X-Mas (2001)
- Katt Gutt (2001)
- Deviating From the Set List (2002)
- Grijalva (2007)
- A Frosty G Christmas (2009)

=== Tracy G & The B.M.B. ===
- Watch Out for The Cucui (1999)

=== Tracy G & Michael Beatty ===
- Me, Myself, and The Rain (1999)

=== Tracy G & The Starr Track Vatos ===
- Stripper Bootleg Live (2002)

=== The Tracy G Group ===
- The Tracy G Group (2003)
- Erector Pili (2006)
- Controlled Chaos (2011)
- Tramp (2017)

=== Curly Fester and The Blues Quartet ===
- ...Live Sessions (2003)

=== Driven ===
- Work in Progress (1999)
- Citizen X (1999)
- Driven (2000)
- Self Inflicted (2001)

=== The Mark Bramlett Band ===
- Fast Women and Slow Horses (2000)

=== Goad-ed ===
- Goad-ed (2005)
- To Die is Gain (2008)

=== Epic ===
- Metaphor (2006)

=== Vessyl ===
- Freakz Unite (2007)

=== Ranfa ===
- Little hard blues (2007)

Special guest in the song "I learned my lesson well"

=== Robot Lords of Tokyo ===
- Virtue & Vice (2012)

=== Pain Savior ===
- Dead Weight on a Dying Planet (2013)

=== Barking Spider ===
- Warrior by Night (single) (2014)
