= Stormer (band) =

American hard rock band

Stormer was an American Hard Rock band that was popular in the 1970s and 80s whose members were Tim Gaines, Donny Simmons, Tom Hardy, Steve Hall, Stephen Shawn, Jeremy Masana, Jimmy Bates and Randy Jones.

Most notably, Stormer had musicians from the San Gabriel Valley who went on to become successful. Stormer's bassist Tim Gaines left to become a member of the popular band Stryper. Donny Simmons, who also played in another popular band, Yankee Rose, was known to be a highly influential guitarist in the San Gabriel Valley, especially to Tracy G, the former guitarist of popular band Dio. Jeremy Masana would later play in The Tracy G Band. Bassist Joe Marks of Rockandi (Vince Neil's band prior to Mötley Crüe) bass replaced Gaines in 1983.

== History ==
Stormer was one of the many popular acts that contributed to the music scene of the Sunset Strip, sharing the stage with London, and Stratus, as well as opening up for Van Halen at the Pasadena Civic and the Golden West.

On November 19, 1976, Stormer played a sold-out show with Van Halen and Smile at the Pasadena Civic to a crowd of 3,500. At this concert, Marshall Berle was in attendance, who later became Van Halen's manager.

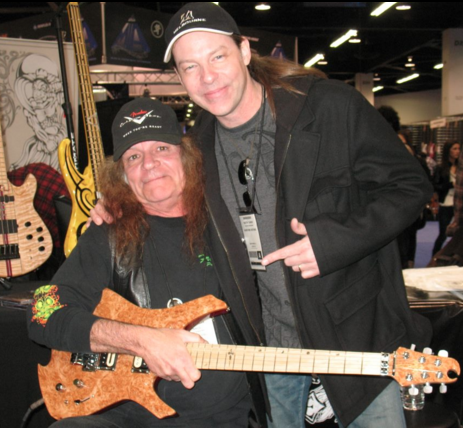
Stormer guitarist Donny Simmons and former bassist Tim Gaines together at 2012 The NAMM Convention in Anaheim, California.

In 2008, when asked if the demos will be remastered and made public, Gaines replied, "I doubt if anyone can find the Masters. We are talking of having a Stormer reunion in the near future. We may decide to record it."

Gaines occasionally collaborated with Donny Simmons and Tom Hardy when he was not working with Stryper.

Josh and Steven Hall Jr., sons of Stormer drummer Steve Hall, have credited their father for being a major influence in their musical career. Josh and Steven are both in popular, award-winning bands Thr3 Strykes and Se7en4.

== Personnel ==
- Tom Hardy – vocals
- Tim Gaines – bass
- Joe Marks – bass
- Lanny Fabian – drums
- Donny Simmons – lead guitar
- Stephen Shawn – guitar
- Jeremy Masana – bass
- Jimmy Bates – guitar
- Ray Boggs – founding member – bass
- Randy Jones – vocals
- Steve Hall – drums
- Dave Hirchak – keyboards, backup vocals
- Thomas James Kielb – original lead singer

== See also ==
- Music of San Gabriel Valley
