= Electra (song) =

Single by Dio
- Released: 2010
- Recorded: 2009; Office Studios, Van Nuys, Los Angeles, Calif., U.S.
- Genre: Heavy metal
- Length: 6:26
- Label: Armoury Records
- Songwriter: Ronnie James Dio
- Producer: Ronnie James Dio

Dio singles chronology
"Hey Angel" (1990)	"Electra" (2010)

"Electra" (also spelled as "Elektra") is the twelfth and final single by heavy metal band Dio. It was released with the band's "Tournado Box Set" in early 2010, before Ronnie James Dio's death on May 16, 2010. It was the last song recorded by the band before that date as well.

The song would later see wider release as part of the posthumous compilation The Very Beast of Dio Vol. 2 in 2012, and on the deluxe edition of Magica in 2013.

== Background ==
In an interview with Hit the Lights series creator Robert Gray, Dio was asked about the Magica II & III album, which Dio responded: "[...]I've been doing a lot of work on the [new] 'Magica' album. I believe we'll release one of the songs from 'Magica' that I decided to put together, so that whatever package we happen to hand to the people when we're out there, it's a lot more attractive with one thing they've never heard before. I guess you could call it a teaser. It's a really good song [called "Electra"], and part of the whole 'Magica' trilogy. It's sometimes hard for it to stand alone, but I did write an explanation of what it was about, and what the song is about, and that it's just a brief glimpse into what will be 'Magica' again. There's some plans to do that – there are some special plans."

The song was originally going to debut during the band's European tour, but the tour was eventually canceled, due to Ronnie James Dio's diagnosis of stomach cancer. "Electra" is the only song, so far that has been released from the unfinished albums Magica II & III.

== Reception ==
Chris Coplan of Consequence of Sound praised the song, stating that "Dio takes things to a whole new level. There’s a freshness and an excitement to the track. And while you can vaguely tell Dio is up in there in years, it gives the vocals a kind of story to them, a feeling of some noble metal statesman once more addressing his kingdom."

== Personnel ==
- Ronnie James Dio – vocals
- Doug Aldrich – guitars
- Rudy Sarzo – bass
- Simon Wright – drums
- Scott Warren – keyboards

=== Additional personnel ===
- Wyn Davis – engineer
- Brett Chassen – assistant engineer
- Adam Arnold – assistant engineer
