= Killing the Dragon =

Studio album by Dio
- Released: May 21, 2002
- Studio: Total Access Recording (Redondo Beach, California)
- Genre: Heavy metal
- Length: 45:10
- Label: Spitfire
- Producer: Ronnie James Dio

Dio chronology
| Magica (2000) | Killing the Dragon (2002) | Master of the Moon (2004) |

Reissue cover
- 2020 reissue cover with updated art by Marc Sasso

Professional ratings
Review scores
| Source | Rating |
|---|---|
| AllMusic | 3/5 stars |
| Blender | 3/5 stars |
| Blabbermouth.net | (6/10) |
| Sputnikmusic | (3.0/5) |

Killing the Dragon is the ninth studio album by American heavy metal band Dio. It was released May 21, 2002 through Spitfire Records and was produced by frontman Ronnie James Dio. The album was reissued in 2007 in a two-CD package with Magica. It was remastered in 2019 and reissued in 2020 with updated album art and a bonus disc containing six tracks recorded live on the Killing the Dragon tour.

== Symbolism ==
In an interview on the TV show Uranium, Dio stated that the "dragon" of the album title refers to technology. He expressed concern with it threatening society in the future. Dio elaborated that the title track refers to "those who perpetrate injustices and what the world is doing to stop them. In fantasy tales, dragons were notorious for stealing children and feeding them to their babies. During the first part of the song, I sing 'Someone has taken a child.' The second part is about a cruel feudal lord. The third part is about 'electronic serfdom.'" He also expressed belief that the computer has become a god in modern society. "It is a small god with an electrical heart (...) It is time to rebel against it."

== Members ==
Killing the Dragon introduces guitarist Doug Aldrich to the band. He had previously performed with Burning Rain and subsequently went on to join the band Whitesnake. Previous guitarist Craig Goldy co-wrote some of the songs before leaving the band. He returned for 2004's Master of the Moon. It is their final album with bassist Jimmy Bain.

== Music video ==
The song "Push" was a hit and had a music video that featured Tenacious D performing a humorous cover of Ronnie James Dio's biggest song from his time with Black Sabbath, "Heaven and Hell". Dio approaches them to tell them that he will pay them to play Tenacious D music. Apparently, according to an interview with Dio in 2005, during filming of this music video, Ronnie James Dio became friends with Tenacious D frontman Jack Black, who told Dio about his plans to make a Tenacious D film and asked him to perform in the film if anything became of it. In 2005, Dio received a letter from Black informing him that production of the film was starting and requested that he play himself. The video was directed by Bill Schacht (who has directed other videos for Alice Cooper, Amon Amarth, Sister Sin, Yngwie Malmsteen, Saxon, etc.) for Aestheticom. The video was listed as No. 54 most metal moment of all time on a VH1 100 Most Metal Moments show, hosted by Eddie Trunk.

== Aborted Hear 'n Aid sequel project ==
The song "Throw Away Children", from this album, was slated to appear in a sequel project to Hear 'n Aid but was aborted due to various reasons.

== Track listing ==
All lyrics by Ronnie James Dio, music as stated. The "Limited Tour Edition" came in a slipcase with poster and added two bonus tracks. These bonus tracks are Ronnie James Dio performing live with Deep Purple and first appeared on Deep Purple's 2001 album Live at the Rotterdam Ahoy. The "Limited Tour Edition" bonus tracks were not included on the 2020 reissue.

The 2020 reissue has a printing error on the vinyl and CD variants; the song "Guilty" is printed as "Guitly".

| No. | Title | Music | Length |
|---|---|---|---|
| 1. | "Killing the Dragon" | Bain, Dio | 4:25 |
| 2. | "Along Comes a Spider" | Doug Aldrich, Bain, Dio | 3:32 |
| 3. | "Scream" | Aldrich, Bain, Dio | 5:02 |
| 4. | "Better in the Dark" | Bain, Dio | 3:43 |
| 5. | "Rock & Roll" | Bain, Dio, Craig Goldy | 6:11 |
| 6. | "Push" | Bain, Dio, Goldy | 4:08 |
| 7. | "Guilty" | Bain, Dio | 4:25 |
| 8. | "Throw Away Children" | Dio, Goldy | 5:35 |
| 9. | "Before the Fall" | Bain, Dio | 3:48 |
| 10. | "Cold Feet" | Bain, Dio | 4:11 |

Bonus tracks
| No. | Title | Music | Length |
|---|---|---|---|
| 11. | "Fever Dreams" (live) | Dio |
| 12. | "Rainbow in the Dark" (live) | Vinny Appice, Bain, Vivian Campbell, Dio |

Bonus tracks - recorded live on the Killing the Dragon tour 2002–2003
| No. | Title | Music | Length |
|---|---|---|---|
| 1. | "Holy Diver" | Dio | 2:57 |
| 2. | "Heaven and Hell" | Butler, Dio, Iommi, Ward | 5:57 |
| 3. | "Rock and Roll" | Bain, Dio, Goldy | 5:20 |
| 4. | "Speed At Night" | Appice, Bain, Campbell, Dio | 3:35 |
| 5. | "Killing The Dragon" | Bain, Dio | 4:13 |
| 6. | "Stand Up and Shout" | Bain, Dio | 3:08 |

== Personnel ==
Dio

- Ronnie James Dio – vocals
- Doug Aldrich – guitar
- Jimmy Bain – bass, keyboards
- Simon Wright – drums
- Scott Warren – keyboards on "Before the Fall"

Additional musicians

- King Harbour Children's Choir — chorus on "Throw Away Children"

Production

- Ronnie James Dio – producer
- Wyn Davis – engineer
- Brian Daugherty – assistant engineer
- Michael McMullen – assistant engineer
- Total Access, Redondo Beach, California – studio
- Eddy Schreyer – mastering at Oasis Mastering
- Marc Sasso – cover illustration

== Charts ==
| Chart (2002) | Peak position |
|---|---|
| Austrian Albums (Ö3 Austria) | 70 |
| Finnish Albums (Suomen virallinen lista) | 28 |
| German Albums (Offizielle Top 100) | 30 |
| Japanese Albums (Oricon) | 85 |
| Swedish Albums (Sverigetopplistan) | 24 |
| UK Independent Albums (OCC) | 27 |
| UK Rock & Metal Albums (OCC) | 23 |
| US Billboard 200 | 199 |
| US Independent Albums (Billboard) | 18 |

| Chart (2020) | Peak position |
|---|---|
| UK Independent Albums (OCC) | 49 |
| UK Rock & Metal Albums (OCC) | 16 |
