= Angry Machines =

- Cover art by Paul R. Gregory

Studio album by Dio
- Released: October 4, 1996
- Studio: Total Access (Redondo Beach, California)
- Genre: Heavy metal
- Length: 44:14
- Label: Mercury; Mayhem
- Producer: Ronnie James Dio

Dio chronology
Strange Highways (1993)	Angry Machines (1996)	Inferno: Last in Live (1998)

Professional ratings
Review scores
Source	Rating
AllMusic	2.5/5 stars
Collector's Guide to Heavy Metal	7/10

Angry Machines is the seventh studio album by American heavy metal band Dio, released on October 4, 1996, through Mercury Records in Japan, and on October 15, 1996, through Mayhem Records in the U.S. It was the last studio album to feature original drummer Vinny Appice, and guitarist Tracy Grijalva. The album was not commercially successful and vastly underperformed compared to earlier Dio albums.

== Reissue ==
In 2019, Angry Machines was remastered and announced for reissue in 2020. While the first disc is identical to the original North American and European releases, the second disc contains live tracks recorded on various dates of the Angry Machines tour. The track "God Hates Heavy Metal," exclusive to Japanese pressings of the album, was not included in the reissue. However, this song was released as a standalone 12 inch single for Record Store Day in 2021, featuring "This is Your Life" and a live version of "Hunter of the Heart" as B sides.

== Track listing ==
All lyrics are written by Ronnie James Dio, music as stated.

Angry Machines track listing
No.	Title	Music	Length
1.	"Institutional Man"	Vinny Appice, Dio, Tracy Grijalva	5:08
2.	"Don't Tell the Kids"	Appice, Dio, Grijalva	4:19
3.	"Black"	Dio, Grijalva, Appice, Jeff Pilson	3:10
4.	"Hunter of the Heart"	Appice, Dio, Grijalva	4:13
5.	"Stay Out of My Mind"	Pilson	7:11
6.	"Big Sister"	Dio, Grijalva, Appice, Pilson	5:35
7.	"Double Monday"	Appice, Dio, Grijalva	2:55
8.	"Golden Rules"	Appice, Dio, Grijalva	4:54
9.	"Dying in America"	Dio, Grijalva, Appice, Pilson	4:38
10.	"This Is Your Life"	Dio, Grijalva	3:25

Japanese edition bonus track
No.	Title	Music	Length
11.	"God Hates Heavy Metal"	Appice, Jerry Best, Dio, Grijalva	3:45

Deluxe edition disc two
No.	Title	Music	Length
1.	"Jesus, Mary and the Holy Ghost / Straight Through the Heart" (Live in Chicago, May 31, 1997)	Jimmy Bain, Dio, Grijalva, Pilson	10:18
2.	"Don't Talk to Strangers" (Live in Chicago, May 31, 1997)	Dio	6:34
3.	"Double Monday / Stand Up and Shout" (Live in Chicago, May 31, 1997)	Bain, Dio, Grijalva, Appice	7:17
4.	"Hunter of the Heart" (Live in Schaumburg, April 11, 1997)	Appice, Dio, Grijalva	5:17
5.	"Holy Diver" (Live in Chicago, May 31, 1997)	Dio	8:53
6.	"Heaven and Hell" (Live in Chicago, May 31, 1997)	Dio, Tony Iommi, Geezer Butler, Bill Ward	7:37
7.	"Long Live Rock and Roll"	Ritchie Blackmore, Dio	3:46
8.	"Man on the Silver Mountain"	Blackmore, Dio	2:09
9.	"Rainbow in the Dark"	Appice, Bain, Vivian Campbell, Dio	4:54
10.	"The Last in Line" (Live in Schaumburg, April 11, 1997)	Bain, Campbell, Dio	6:35
11.	"The Mob Rules"	Butler, Dio, Iommi	3:22
12.	"We Rock"	Dio	5:40

Disc two of the deluxe version was recorded live on the Angry Machines tour in 1996/97. It contains the same recordings as the live album Inferno: Last in Live, omitting "Mistreated/Catch the Rainbow" and switching up the order of the tracks. Track 3 is incorrectly labeled as "Double Monday" only.

== Personnel ==
Dio

- Ronnie James Dio – vocals
- Tracy Grijalva (a.k.a. Tracy G) – guitars
- Jeff Pilson – bass
- Vinny Appice – drums

Additional musicians

- Scott Warren – keyboards

Production

- Recorded and mixed at Total Access Recording in Redondo Beach, California
- Produced by Ronnie James Dio
- Engineered by Wyn Davis
- Second engineered by Darian Rundall and Eddie Ashworth
- Originally mastered by Eddy Schreyer at Oasis Mastering
- Cover illustration by Paul Gregory

== Charts ==
Chart performance for Angry Machines
Chart (2020)	Peak position
German Albums (Offizielle Top 100)	44
