= Jay Gordon (blues musician) =

American blues rock guitarist

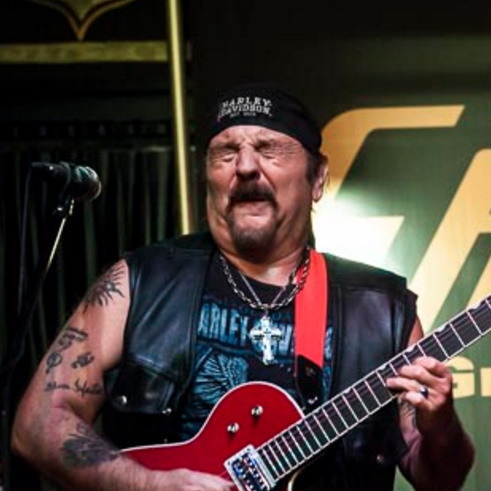
Jay Gordon, performing with the Penetrators, February 2016. Courtesy of Brian Tierney and Backstage360.com

Jay Gordon is an American blues rock guitarist who recorded with Phillip Walker for his album Jaywalkin. Gordon has also played at the 2004 Crossroads Guitar Festival, sharing the stage with Eric Clapton, B.B. King, Jeff Beck, and Carlos Santana.

== Early life ==
Gordon was born in Charlotte, North Carolina and later raised in Chicago, Illinois, "where at an early age he was exposed to jazz and blues by his grandmother, who played the piano and organ." The young Gordon played various instruments, but discovered the guitar at age 14, and played in Top 40 cover bands as a teenager. He met Albert Collins at a young age and cites him as an influence.

== Critical reception ==
=== Negative reactions ===
Electricblues.com has expressed that the album Electric Redemption, "...is heavy-duty, highly animated, guitar-driven blues and heavy rock that will send most traditional blues fans running for cover. Only those interested in seeing just how far the blues can be stretched need dwell here".

BluesRockReview.com reviewed: "[...] there are two main problems [...]; firstly Gordon’s constant wailing solos that become long, self-indulgent and some of the most uneconomical guitar playing around and some poor lyrics that lack a sense of the blues.

=== Positive reviews ===
Many critics have praised Gordon for his instrument prowess, one saying, "This L.A. blues guitar player is a guy who has everyone else just trying to keep up as he pulls off endless incendiary guitar solos. This is Gordon's fourth album, with a fifth threatened for an early '99 release. Here's a guy who attracts guitar players who show up to watch and take notes. GRADE: A−"

Regarding Gordon's album, Extremely Dangerous Blues, another reviewer expressed, "Although these performances are mostly fairly brief, there is no shortage of inventive ideas within the context of rockish Chicago blues, or any loss of passion."

Other reviewers, view Gordon's larger-than-life playing to be ambitious, stating, "Gordon doesn't believe in understatement or simplicity. While his songs tell about overcoming heartache, being an outcast, partying all night long, and starting up a relationship, each one comes loaded with fire. The lyrics may be difficult to understand, but Gordon's powerhouse guitar leaves no doubt that he means business."

== Recordings, personnel and sales rankings ==
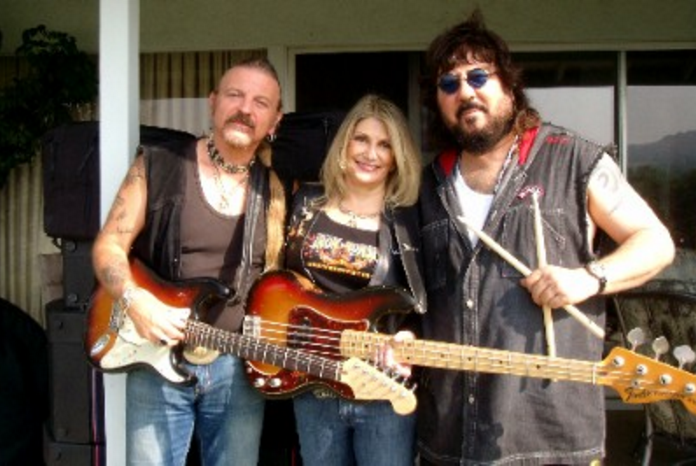
From Left to Right: Jay Gordon, Sharon Butcher, and Abe Perez (former drummer of Yankee Rose) during the recording of White Rabbit at West Beach Studios. Photo courtesy of Michalis Limnios, Blues. Gr 2010

For non-Billboard charting acts, such as Jay Gordon, the Amazon sales rank may indicate relative online popularity and is subject to change at any time.

Year	Album title	Credits and Personnel	Amazon Sales Rank as of March 12, 2016*
2015	Woodchoppers Ball (as Jay and Blues Venom Gordon)		98,419
2010	White Rabbit (as Jay Gordon and the Penetrators)	Sharon Butcher Arranger, Guitar (Bass), Vocals Donnell Cameron Engineer, Mixing, Pro-Tools Jay Gordon Arranger, Composer, Guitar, Mixing, Producer, Vocals Jay Gordon & the Penetrators Primary Artist Michael Hawkins Photography Seth Hum Assistant Engineer, Pro-Tools Dave Longeuay Engineer, Mixing, Pro-Tools Abe Perez Drums, Percussion Joe Rock Artwork Grace Slick Composer	1,513,506
2010	Immortal (as Jay Gordon and the Penetrators)	Sharon Butcher Arranger, Composer, Guitar (Bass), Lyricist, Mixing, Vocals Mark Farrace Composer, Lyricist Jay Gordon Arranger, Composer, Guitar, Lyricist, Mixing, Producer, Vocals Jay Gordon & the Penetrators Primary Artist Michael Hawkins Photography Dave Longeuay Engineer, Mixing, Pro-Tools Abe Perez Drums, Percussion Joe Rock Artwork	729,110
2009	Gold Rings Silver Bullets	Ric Daly Drums, Member of Attributed Artist Lee Davis Drums, Member of Attributed Artist Jay Gordon Composer, Guitar, Member of Attributed Artist, Mixing, Primary Artist, Vocals Jay Gordon & the Penetrators Primary Artist David Longeway Audio Engineer, Mixing Joe Rock Graphic Design John Schayer Guitar (Bass), Member of Attributed Artist Johnny Walker Drums, Member of Attributed Artist	615,809
2007	Rings Around the Sun		484,617
2005	Live On The Sunset Strip No Quarter Given		422,252
2004	6 Strings Outlaw	Butch Black Drums, Main Personnel Bruno Boussard Graphic Design Lee Davis Drums, Main Personnel Patricia de Gorostarzu Photography DJ Johnny Walker Drums, Main Personnel Jay Gordon Audio Production, Composer, Guitar, Harmonica, Main Personnel, Primary Artist, Slide Guitar, Vocals Richard Greene & The Grass Is Greener Bass Russ Greene Bass Instrument, Main Personnel Elmore James Composer M. Levy Composer Clarence Lewis Composer David J. Longeuay Engineer, Mixing John Schayer Guitar (Bass), Main Personnel	923,451
2004	Broadcasting The Blues	Butch Azevedo Drums Luther Dixon Composer Willie Dixon Composer Wil Donovan Drums Jay Gordon Composer, Drums, Guitar (Electric), Liner Notes, Primary Artist, Producer, Slide Guitar, Vocals Buddy Guy Composer Elmore James Composer Clarence Lewis Composer Dean Phelps Pre-Mastering Al Smith Composer Muddy Waters Composer Scott Yanow Liner Notes	313,138
2004	White Haven Powdered Black	Jay Gordon Composer, Primary Artist David J. Longeuay Engineer, Mastering	611,292
2001	Extremely Dangerous Blues	Jay Gordon Primary Artist	No Rank
2000	Jaywalkin with Phillip Walker	Butch Azevedo Drums Donald Cameron Engineer Joey Covington Drums Jay Gordon Composer, Guitar, Guitar (Rhythm), Primary Artist, Producer, Slide Guitar, Vocals Phillip Walker Composer, Guitar, Guitar (Rhythm), Vocals	835,564
1998	Electric Redemption	Butch Azevedo Drums Jay Gordon Arranger, Composer, Guitar, Guitar (Electric), Harmonica, Performer, Primary Artist, Producer, Slide Guitar, Vocals Russ Green Guitar (Bass) David J. Longeuay Engineer, Mastering	628,008

== See also ==
- Chicago blues
- List of blues musicians
- Category:American blues guitarists
