= Inferno: Last in Live =

Live album by Dio
- Released: February 24, 1998
- Recorded: Chicago/Schaumburg, Illinois, USA; New York City, USA; Bremen, Germany; Tokyo, Japan; 1996–1997
- Genre: Heavy metal
- Length: 87:27
- Labels: Mercury (Japan); Mayhem Records (US); SPV/Steamhammer (Europe)
- Producer: Ronnie James Dio

Dio chronology
Angry Machines (1996)	Inferno: Last in Live (1998)	Magica (2000)

Professional ratings
Review scores
Source	Rating
AllMusic	4/5 stars
Collector's Guide to Heavy Metal	7/10
The Rolling Stone Album Guide	1/5 stars

Inferno: Last in Live (also released as Dio's Inferno: The Last In Live) is a live album released by the American heavy metal band Dio. It was recorded on their Angry Machines tour in 1996/97. Released in 1998 on Mayhem Records, it consists of tracks from the Ronnie James Dio eras of Rainbow and Black Sabbath, as well as Dio's own material plus a cover of the Deep Purple track "Mistreated".

== Track listing ==
All lyrics are written by Ronnie James Dio (except "Mistreated" written by David Coverdale), music as stated.

Disc one
No.	Title	Music	Length
1.	"Intro"		1:36
2.	"Jesus, Mary & the Holy Ghost"	Ronnie James Dio, Tracy G, Jeff Pilson	3:27
3.	"Straight Through the Heart"	Dio, Jimmy Bain	5:48
4.	"Don't Talk to Strangers"	Dio	6:03
5.	"Holy Diver"	Dio	4:59
6.	"Drum Solo"		4:02
7.	"Heaven and Hell"	Dio, Tony Iommi, Geezer Butler, Bill Ward	7:29
8.	"Double Monday"	Dio, G, Vinny Appice	3:18
9.	"Stand Up and Shout"	Dio, Bain	4:08
10.	"Hunter of the Heart"	Dio, G, Appice	5:15

Disc two
No.	Title	Music	Length
1.	"Mistreated/Catch the Rainbow"	Ritchie Blackmore, David Coverdale/Dio, Blackmore	10:11
2.	"Guitar Solo"		3:39
3.	"The Last in Line"	Dio, Vivian Campbell, Bain	6:54
4.	"Rainbow in the Dark"	Dio, Campbell, Bain, Appice	4:56
5.	"The Mob Rules"	Dio, Butler, Iommi	3:37
6.	"Man on the Silver Mountain"	Dio, Blackmore	2:11
7.	"Long Live Rock 'n' Roll"	Dio, Blackmore	4:14
8.	"We Rock"	Dio	5:40

Bonus tracks on Japanese pressings
No.	Title	Music	Length
9.	"After All (The Dead)"	Dio, Iommi, Butler	6:20
10.	"I"	Dio, Iommi, Butler	5:26

== Personnel ==
Dio

- Ronnie James Dio – vocals, producer, mixing
- Tracy G – guitars
- Larry Dennison – bass
- Vinny Appice – drums

Additional musicians

- Scott Warren – keyboards

Production

- Moray McMillian, Martin "Ferrit" Rowe – engineers
- Wyn Davies – mixing
- Eddie Schreyer – mastering
- Timothy S. Wright – guitar tech

== Charts ==
Chart (1998)	Peak position
Finnish Albums (Suomen virallinen lista)	40
