= Yankee Rose (band) =

American rock band

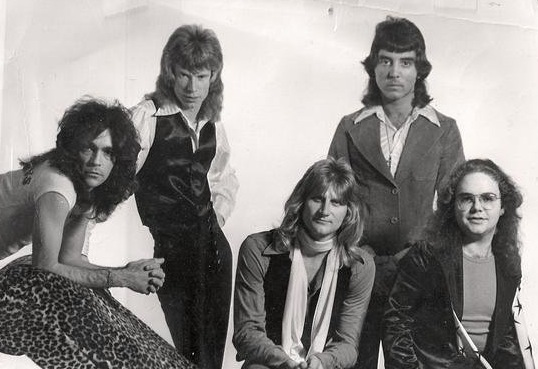
Yankee Rose is (Clockwise from left) Donny Simmons, Michael Adams, Abe Perez, John Rockwood, Pete Currier.

Yankee Rose was a Los Angeles-based rock band in the 1970s and '80s, whose notable members were guitarist Donny Simmons of another popular band Stormer, drummer Abe Perez who recorded with popular blues guitarist Jay Gordon, singer Michael Adams who currently performs as 'Mick Adams' for the Rolling Stones Tribute Band 'Mick Adams and the Stones'.

== Personnel ==
- Michael "Mick" Adams – vocals
- Donny Simmons – guitar
- John Rockwood – guitar
- Pete Currier – bass
- Abe Perez – drums
- Tom Barringer – drums

== Popularity in the Los Angeles Music Scene ==
Yankee Rose frequently performed at many of the popular clubs in Los Angeles and Hollywood, sharing the stage many notable acts, such as, Movies and Aunti-Up at Hong Kong Cafe, Dolphins, Popsicles, Axis and Smile, and Gilbert Gram at the Troubadour, Erin's All Stars, The Blitz Bros, the Penny's, the Rabble, Wynield, and Obryan, at the Starwood, and Bluebeard at the Whisky a Go Go.

== Recordings ==
Before signing to Satellite records, Yankee Rose recorded a demo with original founding member, Abe Perez. The demo includes other songs, such as, "Alex" and "Dead Roses".

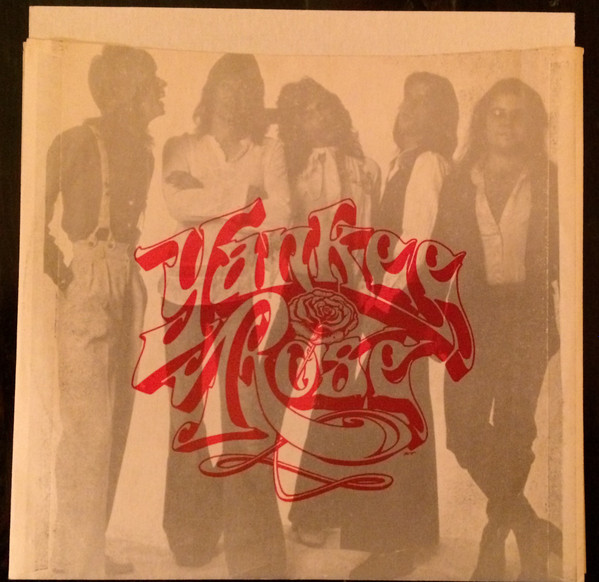
Yankee Rose "Lady River" 7-inch single, promo

Yankee Rose released a single under Satellite Records, "Lady River" and "Desarae" as the B-side which was produced by Kent Bender. The personnel included Pete Currier on bass guitar, Jon Rockwood on lead guitar, vocals, and keyboards, Donny Simmons on vocals and lead guitar, Michael Adams on lead vocals, with new drummer Tom Barringer.

== Reviews ==
=== Yankee Rose (1980 album) ===
In 1980, Yankee Rose recorded and released a self-titled album with Goldmine Records. In John M. Borack's, Shake Some Action – The Ultimate Guide To Power Pop, Yankee Rose is #121 on the list. Borack provides a favorable review of the Yankee Rose album, saying, "Another hopelessly obscure 'un, and one that's never made it to CD. Too bad, too, because these guys had the pleading-voiced teen angst thing down pat, especially on the absolutely superb "Any Time of the Day". Kudos to lead vocalist Michael Adams"

== See also ==
- Music of San Gabriel Valley
