= Craig Goldy =

American guitarist

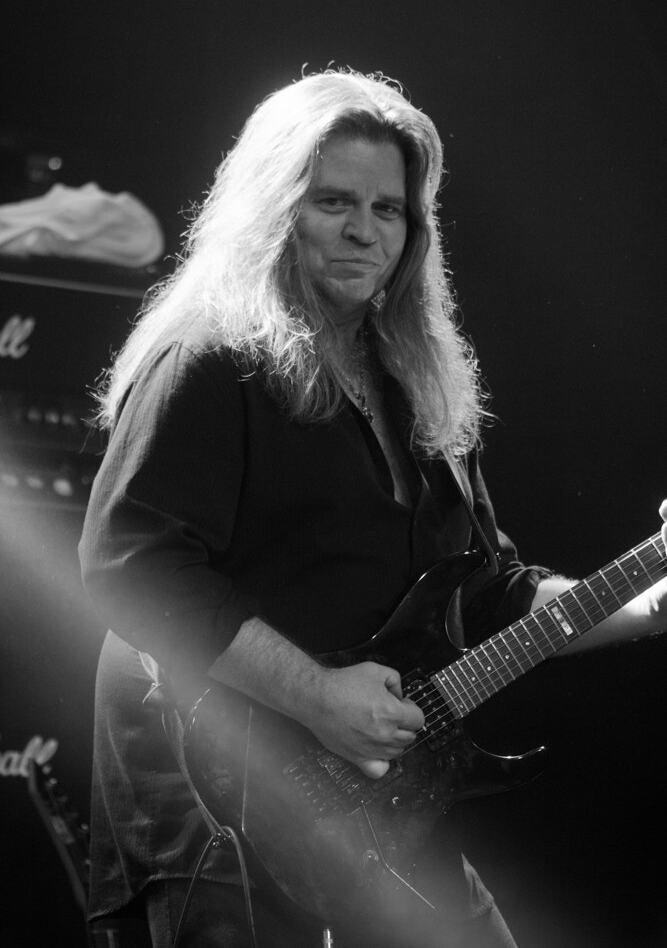

Background information
- Born: November 6, 1961 (age 63) San Diego, California, U.S.
- Instrument: Guitar
- Years active: 1980–present
- Website: craiggoldy.com

Thomas "Craig" Goldy (born November 6, 1961) is an American musician, best known as the guitarist of the rock bands Dio and Giuffria.

== Early musical life ==
Goldy was born in San Diego, California. Before Dio, he played in the bands Vengeance, Rough Cutt, and Giuffria. He replaced Jake E. Lee in Rough Cutt and was himself replaced by Amir Derakh. While with Rough Cutt, Goldy played on demos produced by Ronnie James Dio.

== Career ==
=== Giuffria ===
Shortly after leaving Rough Cutt, Goldy would join Giuffria, the eponymous band of former Angel keyboardist, Gregg Giuffria. Performing on Giuffria's self-titled debut album, released in 1984, Goldy is heard on the band's biggest hit, "Call to the Heart," which hit #15 on the Billboard charts in early 1985.

=== Dio ===
Goldy performed on the Dio album Dream Evil, but this first stint with the band was short lived and he left for unknown reasons. In 2000, Goldy returned to Dio and helped record Magica, but shortly thereafter left again due to family commitments. Doug Aldrich replaced him for the album, Killing the Dragon. However, Goldy was back in the Dio fold for what turned out to be the band's final studio album, Master of the Moon, in 2004. Goldy temporarily left the group for the third time in 2005, after suffering a hand injury on tour through Russia. He was again replaced by Doug Aldrich for the duration of the tour.

=== Other projects ===
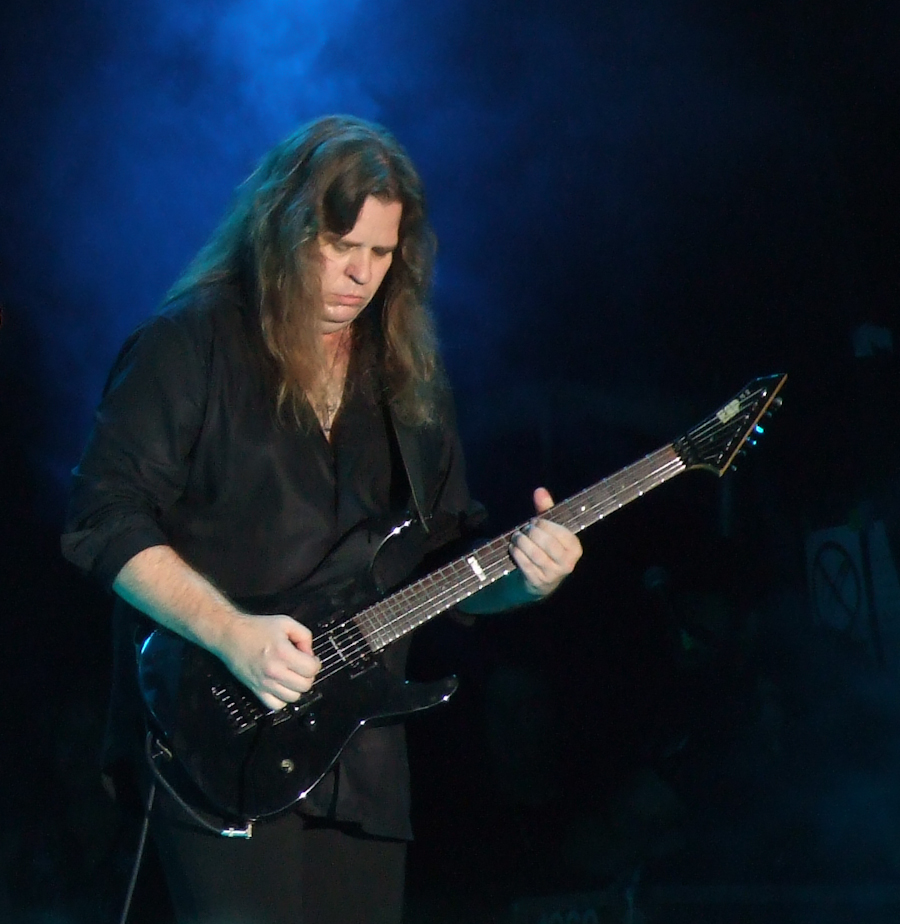
Goldy performing with the tribute formation DIO Disciples at Kavarna Rock Fest, 2012

Goldy was featured in Hear 'n Aid - Stars project while still in Giuffria, alongside other players such as Adrian Smith and Dave Murray of Iron Maiden, Yngwie Malmsteen, Brad Gillis.

In 1985, Goldy was coerced by buddy Jeff Scott Soto who had just departed from Yngwie Malmsteen in 1985, to leave Giuffria and join forces with him in a new supergroup consisting of bassist Rudy Sarzo and drummer Tommy Aldridge who had recently parted ways with Ozzy Osbourne, replacing guitarist Kurt James. Soto eventually left the fold as did Goldy while the roundtable of musicians finally landed with singer Rob Rock and guitarist Tony MacAlpine which recorded one album as M.A.R.S. Project Driver. Goldy left the group to join Dio.

After exiting Dio, Goldy formed his own band, Craig Goldy's Ritual, and signed a deal with Grand Slamm Records for the release of Hidden In Plain Sight in 1991. The album featured lead vocals by Goldy's former Guiffria bandmate David Glen Eisley and future Queensrÿche guitarist Mike Stone.

Goldy co-wrote the song "Lady Luck" with David Lee Roth on the latter's 1991 album A Little Ain't Enough.

In 1993, Goldy released his first solo album, Insufficient Therapy, on Shrapnel Records, with Jeff Pilson co-writing and contributing lead vocals on 4 songs. A follow-up, the all-instrumental Better Late Than Never, was released in 1995. During that time, Goldy and Pilson also collaborated in a progressive heavy rock project named 13th Floor although no album was ever released.

In February 2008 Goldy accompanied Welsh heavy metal pioneers Budgie on their first tour of Australia and subsequently continued playing with the group as 'guest guitarist'. Budgie's live activities came to an abrupt end when vocalist/bassist Burke Shelley was hospitalized on November 9, 2010, in Wejherowo, Poland with an aortic aneurysm. Shelley could no longer sing and play at the same time.

In 2011, Goldy became a member of Dio Disciples along with former Dio band members Scott Warren, Rudy Sarzo and Simon Wright, and former Judas Priest vocalist Tim "Ripper" Owens. Goldy and Warren are currently the only members left of the original Dio Disciples line-up.

In 2014, Goldy announced a new collaboration with former Quiet Riot vocalist Mark Huff and the release of 2 songs, "Hole In My Heart" and "Dark Rainbow", in tribute to his former mentor Ronnie James Dio. The duo has since been joined by Brazilian born bassist Dario Seixas, MSG guitarist/keyboardist Wayne Findlay, and former Cry Wolf drummer Chris Moore.

In October 2014, Goldy was announced as part of the 2015 XG Extreme Guitar Tour line-up alongside Uli Jon Roth and Vinnie Moore. Goldy is set to perform with his all-star band Black Knights Rising featuring drummer Vinny Appice, vocalist Mark Boals, keyboardist Allesandro Bertoni, and bassist Elliott Rubinson.

In January 2016, Goldy released a new collaboration called Resurrection Kings with drummer Vinny Appice, bassist Sean McNabb and vocalist Chas West. The recording was released January 26, 2016, on Frontiers Records.

Im August 2018, Goldy along with his former Dio bandmates Rudy Sarzo and Simon Wright released a new collaboration via Frontiers Records called Dream Child. The project also features guitarist/keyboardist Wayne Findlay (ex- MSG) and the Argentine singer Diego Valdez (Helker).

== Guitars ==
His main guitar was a B.C. Rich Warlock, however, he now uses an ESP M-II through ENGL Powerball amplifiers. He has modified the guitar by switching the EMG pickups with Seymour Duncan pickups. He also played a Yamaha Pacifica 1221M on Insufficient Therapy solo album and the 2001 tour with Dio.

== Discography ==
=== With Rough Cutt ===
- Demos (early 1980s)
- "Try A Little Harder" (1983)

=== With Giuffria ===
- Giuffria (1984)

=== With Dio ===
- Intermission EP (1986) "Time To Burn" only
- Dream Evil (1987)
- Magica (2000)
- Master of the Moon (2004)

=== With Craig Goldy's Ritual ===
- Hidden In Plain Sight (1991)

=== Solo ===
- Insufficient Therapy (1993)
- Better Late Than Never (1995)

=== Resurrection Kings ===
- Resurrection Kings (2016)
- Skygazer (2021)

=== Eisley/Goldy ===
- Blood, Guts and Games (2017)

=== Dream Child ===
- Until Death Do We Meet Again (2018)

== On Ronnie James Dio ==
Goldy expressed his feelings regarding the passing of Dio (excerpt):

"Ronnie James Dio is and was more than a legendary musician, friend and fellow band member, he was my family. He is the reason anyone really even knows who I am at all and why I exist. He rescued me from sleeping in a car on the streets of San Diego and Los Angeles and brought me into his world where dreams come true, kindness to strangers and fans, warmth, humility and integrity are paramount and where creativity could be without boundaries that could change people's lives forever. I know he changed mine. Not just through his music and the voice that turned his unique abilities into a legend, but who he was as a person and how he treated me and everyone he came in contact with directly and indirectly."
