= Magica (album) =

Studio album by Dio
- Released: March 21, 2000
- Recorded: 1999–2000
- Studios: Total Access Recording (Redondo Beach, California)
- Genre: Heavy metal
- Length: 71:50
- Label: Spitfire
- Producer: Ronnie James Dio

Dio chronology
Inferno: Last in Live (1998)	Magica (2000)	Killing the Dragon (2002)

Professional ratings
Review scores
Source	Rating
AllMusic	4/5 stars
Kerrang!	4/5 stars
Metal Forces	(9/10)
PopMatters	7/10 stars
Record Collector	3/5 stars

Magica is the eighth studio album by American heavy metal band Dio. A concept album, it was produced by frontman Ronnie James Dio and released on March 21, 2000, through Spitfire Records.

The album marks the return of guitarist Craig Goldy, who also has performed on Dio's album Dream Evil and in the later release Master of the Moon. Magica also features Jimmy Bain on bass and Simon Wright on drums. The album was originally planned to be the first part of a trilogy of concept albums. Shortly before beginning his tour with Heaven & Hell, Dio announced his intention to start the Magica II & III album after the tour's end, but he died shortly after of stomach cancer on May 16, 2010. The only song released from Magica II & III was titled "Electra".

== Concept ==
Said Dio: "Magica is the saga of Blessing, a netherworld invaded by dark forces that vaporise people into pure, evil energy. The planet's saviours are master, apprentice heroes Eriel and Challis, who must recite a spell from the sacred book of Magica to defeat their foe, Shadowcast. The album is written from the villain's viewpoint. (...) I took on the evil perspective because I've always written from the anti-perspective. Most people don't think in those terms so you are freer to create. I left the ending ambivalent because evil always exists, good doesn't always triumph and that's the universal balance."

== Reissues ==
A 2007 re-release puts Magica together with Killing the Dragon.

Dio guitarist Craig Goldy stated in an interview "We were working on tracks for a new DIO album just before Ronnie died in May. And we did almost finish one song. Wendy [Dio, Ronnie's widow/manager] has been talking about reissuing [DIO's] 'Magica' album (originally released in 2000) with bonus tracks, including this one." Goldy said that the lyrics were written by Dio when he was fighting cancer, and are "very emotional" and "hard to listen to without a lump at the back of your throat".

On April 15, 2013, Niji announced that a deluxe two-disc version of Magica would be released on June 25, 2013. The first disc is identical to the original North American release (though it is remastered by Wyn Davis), but the narration track "The Magica Story" is moved to the second disc. The instrumental "Annica" (originally a Japan-only bonus track) is also on the second disc, as well as "Electra", and six "Official Live Bootleg" (live recordings of Magica tracks). The "Official Live Bootleg" songs were recorded between 2000 and 2002, at various dates on the Magica and Killing the Dragon tours. "Turn to Stone" was announced on the official press release for the deluxe edition, issued by Niji Entertainment Group, but was eventually omitted from the album, for unknown reasons.

In 2019, Magica was remastered and announced for reissue in 2020. Like the previous reissue, it contains the track "Electra", but it is missing the instrumental "Annica". It also contains nine previously unreleased live tracks.

== Track listing ==
All tracks are written by Ronnie James Dio and Craig Goldy except where noted. "The Magica Story" is a spoken narration by Dio.

No.	Title	Writer(s)	Length
1.	"Discovery"	Dio	0:54
2.	"Magica Theme"	Dio	1:16
3.	"Lord of the Last Day"	Dio	4:04
4.	"Fever Dreams"	Dio	4:37
5.	"Turn to Stone"		5:19
6.	"Feed My Head"		5:39
7.	"Eriel"		7:22
8.	"Challis"		4:25
9.	"As Long as It's Not About Love"		6:04
10.	"Losing My Insanity"		5:04
11.	"Otherworld"		4:56
12.	"Magica (Reprise)"	Dio	1:53
13.	"Lord of the Last Day (Reprise)"	Dio	1:44
14.	"Magica Story"		18:26
Total length:			71:50

Bonus track (Japanese pressings)
No.	Title	Length
11.	"Annica"	3:43

2013 deluxe edition disc two
No.	Title	Length
1.	"The Magica Story"	18:23
2.	"Annica"	3:42
3.	"Electra"	6:22
4.	"Feed My Head (official live bootleg)"	5:43
5.	"Fever Dreams (official live bootleg)"	4:17
6.	"Lord of the Last Day (official live bootleg)"	4:08
7.	"As Long as It's Not About Love (official live bootleg)"	5:34
8.	"Losing My Insanity (official live bootleg)"	4:04

Track 4 was recorded on March 29, 2000 in Hollywood; tracks 5 and 6 on December 12, 2002 in New York City; and tracks 7 and 8 on April 29, 2000 in New York City.

2019 deluxe edition disc two
No.	Title	Length
1.	"Discovery"	1:14
2.	"Magica"	1:19
3.	"Lord of the Last Day"	3:53
4.	"Fever Dreams"	4:07
5.	"Feed My Head"	5:23
6.	"Eriel"	7:21
7.	"Challis"	4:10
8.	"Losing My Insanity"	3:58
9.	"Otherworld"	9:16
10.	"Electra" (Studio Track)	6:26
11.	"Magica Story" (Studio Track)	18:26

Tracks 1 to 9 were recorded live on March 31, 2001 in Buenos Aires, Argentina. The track "Feed My Head" was omitted from digital releases.

== Personnel ==
Dio

- Ronnie James Dio – vocals, keyboards
- Craig Goldy – guitars, keyboards
- Jimmy Bain – bass
- Simon Wright – drums

Production

- Recorded at Total Access Recording in Redondo Beach, California
- Produced by Ronnie James Dio
- Engineered by Wyn Davis
- Artwork by Stuart Green

== Charts ==
Chart (2000)	Peak position
Finnish Albums (Suomen virallinen lista)	26
German Albums (Offizielle Top 100)	40
Japanese Albums (Oricon)	71
Swedish Albums (Sverigetopplistan)	52
UK Rock & Metal Albums (Official Charts)	20
US Independent Albums (Billboard)	13

Chart (2020)	Peak position
German Albums (Offizielle Top 100)	32
UK Independent Albums (Official Charts)	47
UK Rock & Metal Albums (Official Charts)	15
US Indie Store Album Sales (Billboard)	21
